= List of places in Georgia (U.S. state) (E–H) =

This is a list of current cities, towns, unincorporated communities, counties, and other recognized places in the U.S. state of Georgia. This list also includes information on the number and names of counties in which the place lies, and its lower and upper ZIP Code bounds, if applicable.

Name of place	Number of counties	Principal county	Lower zip code	Upper zip code
Eagle Cliff	1	Walker County	30725	
Eagle Grove	1	Hart County	30520	
Eagle Pond	1	Lee County	31787	
Eanes	1	Chatham County		
Earls Ford	1	Rabun County		
Early	1	Floyd County		
Eason	1	Thomas County		
Eason Bluff	1	Appling County		
East Albany	1	Dougherty County		
East Americus	1	Sumter County		
Eastanollee	1	Stephens County	30538	
East Armuchee	1	Walker County	30728	
East Atlanta	1	DeKalb County	30316	
East Boundary	1	Richmond County	30901	
East Boynton	1	Catoosa County	30736	
East Bremen	1	Haralson County		
East Brunswick	1	Glynn County		
East Cobb	1	Cobb County	30068	
East Cordele	1	Crisp County		
East Crisp	1	Crisp County		
East Dougherty	1	Worth County		
East Dublin	1	Laurens County	31021	
East Edgewood	1	Muscogee County		
East Ellijay	1	Gilmer County	30539	
East Englewood	1	Muscogee County		
East Griffin	1	Spalding County	30223	
East Highlands	1	Muscogee County		
East Juliette	1	Jones County	31046	
East Lake	1	DeKalb County		
Eastland Heights	1	DeKalb County		
Eastman	1	Dodge County	31023	
Eastman Mills	1	Dodge County	31023	
East Marietta	1	Cobb County	30060	
East Meadow	1	Clarke County	30601	
East Moultrie	1	Colquitt County	31768	
East Newnan	1	Coweta County	30263	
East Point	1	Fulton County	30344	
East Savannah	1	Chatham County		
East Side	1	Whitfield County	30721	
East Thomaston	1	Upson County	30286	
East Trion	1	Chattooga County	30753	
East Vidalia	1	Toombs County		
East View	1	Richmond County		
Eastville	1	Oconee County	30621	
East Warrenton	1	Warren County		
East Waynesboro	1	Burke County		
Eastwood	1	DeKalb County	30316	30317
Eastwood Apartments	1	Bibb County	31206	
Eatonton	1	Putnam County	31024	
Ebenezer	1	Walton County	30279	
Echeconnee	1	Peach County	31008	
Echota	1	Gordon County	30701	
Eden	1	Effingham County	31307	
Edgars	1	Wilkinson County		
Edge Hill	1	Glascock County	30810	
Edgemere	1	Chatham County		
Edgemoor East	1	Clayton County	30236	
Edgemoor West	1	Clayton County	30236	
Edgewater Park	1	Chatham County	31406	
Edgewood	1	Columbia County	31907	
Edgewood	1	DeKalb County		
Edgewood	1	Muscogee County		
Edgewood Crossroads	1	Taliaferro County		
Edison	1	Calhoun County	31746	
Edith	1	Clinch County	31631	
Edman	1	Meriwether County		
Edna	1	Evans County		
Eelbeck	1	Chattahoochee County		
Egan	1	Fulton County	30044	
Egypt	1	Effingham County	31329	
Eightmile Still	1	Clinch County		
Eisenhower Army Medical Center	1	Richmond County	30905	
Elberta	1	Houston County	31093	
Elberton	1	Elbert County	30635	
Elder	1	Oconee County	30677	
Elders	1	Gilmer County		
Elders Mill	1	Coweta County		
Eldora	1	Bryan County	31308	
Eldorado	1	Tift County		
Eldorendo	1	Decatur County	31717	
Eleanor Village (subdivision)	1	Dougherty County	31701	
Elery	1	Heard County	30217	
Elim	1	Long County	31316	
Elizabeth	1	Cobb County	30060	
Elko	1	Houston County	31025	
Ellabell	1	Bryan County	31308	
Ellabelle	1	Bryan County		
Ella Gap	1	Gilmer County		
Ellaville	1	Schley County	31806	
Ellenton	1	Colquitt County	31747	
Ellenwood	1	Clayton County	30049	
Ellerbeetown	1	Upson County		
Ellerslie	1	Harris County	31807	
Ellijay	1	Gilmer County	30540	
Elliotts Bluff	1	Camden County		
Ellis Plantation	1	Jefferson County		
Ellwood	1	Richmond County	30805	
Elmodel	1	Baker County	31770	
Elmview	1	Marion County		
Elmwood	1	Laurens County	31021	
Elpino	1	Grady County		
Elrod Mill	1	Fannin County		
Elza	1	Tattnall County	30453	
Embry	1	Paulding County	30132	
Embry Hills	1	DeKalb County	30341	
Emerich	1	Dooly County		
Emerson	1	Bartow County	30137	
Emerson	1	Brooks County		
Emerson Park	1	Ware County	31501	
Emit	1	Bulloch County	30458	
Emma	1	Dawson County	30551	
Emmalane	1	Jenkins County	30442	
Emory University	1	DeKalb County	30322	
Empire	1	Dodge County	31026	
Empress	1	Brooks County	31643	
Englewood	1	Muscogee County		
English Eddy	1	Toombs County		
Enigma	1	Berrien County	31749	
Ennis	1	Washington County		
Enon Grove	1	Heard County	30217	
Ensign Mills	1	Monroe County		
Enterprise	1	Miller County		
Enterprise	1	Oglethorpe County	30627	
Ephesus	1	Heard County	30170	
Epworth	1	Fannin County	30541	
Erastus	1	Banks County		
Erick	1	Wheeler County		
Ernest	1	Clinch County		
Escambia	1	Glynn County		
Eskay	1	Lowndes County		
Esmond	1	Spalding County		
Esom Hill	1	Polk County	30138	
Estelle	1	Walker County		
Ethridge	1	Elbert County		
Ethridge	1	Jones County		
Etna	1	Polk County	30138	
Eton	1	Murray County	30724	
Eudora	1	Jasper County	30255	
Euharlee	1	Bartow County	30120	
Eulonia	1	McIntosh County	31331	
Evans	1	Columbia County	30809	
Evansville	1	Troup County	30240	
Evelyn	1	Glynn County		
Everett	1	Glynn County	31520	
Everett	1	Thomas County		
Everett Springs	1	Floyd County	30105	
Evergreen	1	Dougherty County	31707	
Evermay	1	Meriwether County	30218	
Ewing	1	Clinch County		
Excelsior	1	Candler County	30439	
Excelsior	1	Tift County		
Executive Park	1	DeKalb County	30347	
Exley	1	Effingham County		
Experiment	1	Spalding County	30212	
Faceville	1	Decatur County	31717	
Fagan	1	Peach County		
Fain	1	Union County		
Fairbanks	1	Floyd County		
Fairburn	1	Fulton County	30213	
Fairchild	1	Seminole County		
Fairfax	1	Ware County	31552	
Fairfield	1	Chatham County		
Fairhope	1	McIntosh County		
Fairlawn Acres	1	Catoosa County	30741	
Fairmount	1	Gordon County	30139	
Fair Oaks	1	Cobb County	30060	
Fairplay	1	Douglas County	30187	
Fairplay	1	Morgan County	30663	
Fairview	1	Franklin County		
Fairview	1	Habersham County	30535	
Fairview	1	Stephens County		
Fairview	1	Walker County	30741	
Fairway Oaks	1	Chatham County		
Fairyland	1	Walker County		
Falling Rocks	1	Appling County		
Fancy Bluff	1	Glynn County		
Fancy Hall	1	Bryan County		
Fantasy Hills	1	Walker County	37409	
Fargo	1	Clinch County	31631	
Farmdale	1	Screven County	30467	
Farmers High	1	Carroll County	30117	
Farmersville	1	Chattooga County		
Farmington	1	Oconee County	30638	
Farmville	1	Gordon County	30701	
Farrar	1	Jasper County	31085	
Fashion	1	Murray County	30705	
Faulkner	1	Pickens County	30107	
Fayetteville	1	Fayette County	30214	
Federal	1	Dougherty County	31702	
Federal Annex	1	Fulton County	30302	
Federal Law Enforcement Training Center	1	Glynn County		
Federal Reserve	1	Fulton County	30303	
Federal Station	1	Dougherty County	31702	
Felton	1	Haralson County	30140	
Fence	1	Gwinnett County	30203	
Fender	1	Tift County	31794	
Fendig	1	Brantley County		
Fernwood	1	Chatham County		
Ferrell Crossroads	1	Early County		
Ferry Lake	1	Tift County		
Ficklin	1	Wilkes County	30673	
Fickling Mill	1	Taylor County	31006	
Fidelle	1	Gordon County	30735	
Fields	1	Macon County		
Fields Crossroads	1	Fulton County		
Fife	1	Fulton County	30213	
Fighting Pine	1	Stephens County		
Fincherville	1	Butts County	30233	
Findlay	1	Dooly County	31070	
Finleyson	1	Pulaski County	31071	
Firestone	1	Dougherty County		
Fish	1	Polk County		
Fish Creek	1	Polk County	30125	
Fitzgerald	2	Ben Hill County	31750	
Fitzgerald	2	Irwin County	31750	
Fitzgerald Cotton Mill	1	Ben Hill County	31750	
Fitzpatrick	1	Twiggs County	31044	
Five Forks	1	Bartow County		
Five Forks	1	Gwinnett County	30245	
Five Forks	1	Thomas County	31626	
Fivemile Still	1	Clinch County		
Five Points	1	Banks County		
Five Points	1	Carroll County		
Five Points	1	Dodge County		
Five Points	1	Dougherty County		
Five Points	1	Fulton County		
Five Points	1	Glascock County		
Five Points	1	Jones County		
Five Points	1	Lamar County		
Five Points	1	Laurens County		
Five Points	1	Lowndes County	31601	
Five Points	1	Macon County	31063	
Five Points	1	Marion County		
Five Points	1	Randolph County	31786	
Five Points	1	Tattnall County		
Five Points	1	Taylor County	31006	
Five Points	1	Thomas County		
Five Points	1	Treutlen County	30457	
Five Points	1	Turner County		
Five Points	1	Wilcox County		
Five Springs	1	Whitfield County	30720	
Flat Branch	1	Gilmer County		
Flat Ford	1	Cook County		
Flat Ford	1	Irwin County		
Flatlands	1	Union County		
Flat Rock	1	Muscogee County	31820	
Flat Rock	1	Putnam County	31024	
Flat Shoals	1	Hart County	30516	
Flea Hill	1	Camden County		
Fleetwood	1	Chatham County		
Fleming	1	Liberty County	31309	
Flemington	1	Liberty County	31313	
Flint	1	Mitchell County	31716	
Flint Hill	1	Talbot County	31826	
Flintside	1	Sumter County	31735	
Flintstone	1	Walker County	30725	
Flippen	1	Henry County	30253	
Floralhill	1	Wilkes County	30632	
Florence	1	Stewart County		
Florida Junction	1	Chatham County		
Florida Rock	1	Muscogee County		
Flovilla	1	Butts County	30216	
Flowery Branch	1	Hall County	30542	
Floyd	1	Cobb County		
Floyd Springs	1	Floyd County	30105	
Fodie	1	Brooks County		
Folkston	1	Charlton County	31537	
Folsom	1	Bartow County	30103	
Forest Glen	1	Wilcox County		
Forest Hills	1	Gwinnett County		
Forest Hills	1	Richmond County	30909	
Forest Lake	1	Bibb County	31204	
Forest Park	1	Clayton County	30050	
Forest Park	1	Dougherty County	31701	
Forest Pond	1	Wayne County		
Forest River Farms	1	Chatham County	31406	
Forestview	1	Camden County		
Forge Mill	1	Fannin County		
Forrester	1	Lee County		
Forrest Hills	1	Chatham County		
Forrestville	1	Floyd County		
Forsyth	1	Monroe County	31029	
Fort Benning Junction	1	Muscogee County		
Fort Benning South	1	Chattahoochee County	31905	
Fort Gordon	4	Columbia County	30905	
Fort Gordon	4	Jefferson County	30905	
Fort Gordon	4	McDuffie County	30905	
Fort Gordon	4	Richmond County	30905	
Fort Frederica National Monument	1	Glynn County	31552	
Fort Gaines	1	Clay County	31751	
Fort Gillem	1	Clayton County	30050	
Fort Lamar	1	Madison County	30633	
Fort McAllister	1	Bryan County	31324	
Fort McPherson	1	Fulton County	30330	
Fort Moore	2	Chattahoochee County	31905	
Fort Moore	2	Muscogee County	31905	
Fort Mudge	1	Brantley County		
Fort Oglethorpe	2	Catoosa County	30742	
Fort Oglethorpe	2	Walker County	30742	
Fort Pulaski National Monument	1	Chatham County	31328	
Fort Screven	1	Chatham County	31328	
Fort Smith	1	Lumpkin County		
Fortson	1	Muscogee County	31808	
Fortsonia	1	Elbert County	30635	
Fort Stewart	5	Bryan County	31314	
Fort Stewart	5	Evans County	31314	
Fort Stewart	5	Liberty County	31314	
Fort Stewart	5	Long County	31314	
Fort Stewart	5	Tattnall County	31314	
Fort Valley	1	Peach County	31030	
Fortville	1	Jones County		
Foster	1	Sumter County		
Foster Hills	1	Catoosa County	30736	
Fosters Mills	1	Floyd County	30161	
Fouche	1	Floyd County		
Fountainville	1	Macon County		
Four Points	1	Dougherty County	31705	
Four Points	1	Jenkins County		
Four Points	1	Macon County		
Fouts Mill	1	Douglas County		
Fowlertown	1	Stephens County		
Fowlstown	1	Decatur County	31752	
Fowltown	1	Decatur County		
Franklin	1	Heard County	30217	
Franklin Springs	1	Franklin County	30639	
Franklinton	1	Bibb County	31020	
Frazier	1	Bleckley County	31014	
Free Home	1	Cherokee County	30114	
Freeman	1	Early County		
Friendship	1	Crawford County		
Friendship	1	Hancock County		
Friendship	1	Polk County	30125	
Friendship	1	Sumter County	31709	
Friendship	1	Towns County		
Frolona	1	Heard County	30217	
Fruitland	1	Echols County	31630	
Fry	1	Fannin County	30555	
Fulco	1	Fulton County		
Fulco Junction	1	Fulton County		
Fullerville	1	Carroll County	30180	
Fullwood Springs	1	Polk County		
Funkhouser	1	Bartow County	30139	
Funston	1	Colquitt County	31753	
Furniture City	1	Cobb County	30001	
Gabbettville	1	Troup County	30240	
Gaddistown	1	Union County	30572	
Gaillard	1	Crawford County	31078	
Gaines Community	1	Clarke County	30605	
Gaines School	1	Clarke County		
Gainesville	1	Hall County	30501	07
Gainesville Mills	1	Hall County	30501	
Galloway	1	Fannin County	30513	
Galloway Mill	1	Fannin County		
Gammage	1	Worth County		
Ganor	1	Colquitt County		
Garden City	1	Chatham County	31418	
Garden Lakes	1	Floyd County	30161	
Garden Valley	1	Macon County	31041	
Gardi	1	Wayne County	31545	
Gardner	1	Washington County		
Garfield	1	Emanuel County	30425	
Garnersville	1	Clay County	31767	
Garretta	1	Laurens County	31021	
Gary	1	Emanuel County	30401	
Gasco	1	Fulton County		
Gass	1	Dade County		
Gate City	1	Fulton County	30312	
Gateway	1	Thomas County	31792	
Gatewood	1	Sumter County		
Gay	1	Meriwether County	30218	
Geneva	1	Talbot County	31810	
Gennett	1	Gilmer County		
Gentian	1	Muscogee County		
Georgetown	1	Chatham County	31405	
Georgetown	1	Glynn County		
Georgetown	1	Newton County	30267	
Georgetown	1	Quitman County	31754	
Georgia Diagnostic and Classification Center	1	Butts County	30233	
Georgia Southern	1	Bulloch County	30458	
Georgia Southwestern College	1	Sumter County	31709	
Georgia State Prison	1	Tattnall County		
Georgia University	1	Clarke County	30612	
German Village	1	Glynn County		
Germany	1	Rabun County	30525	
Gertrude	1	Burke County		
Gholston Stand Crossroads	1	Madison County		
Gibson	1	Glascock County	30810	
Gill	1	Lincoln County	30632	
Gillionville	1	Dougherty County		
Gillis Springs	1	Treutlen County	30457	
Gillsville	2	Banks County	30543	
Gillsville	2	Hall County	30543	
Gilmore	1	Cobb County	30080	
Girard	1	Burke County	30426	
Glades	1	Hall County		
Gladesville	1	Jasper County	31064	
Gladys	1	Berrien County	31622	
Glasgow	1	Thomas County	31626	
Glen Alta	1	Marion County		
Glen Arden	1	Muscogee County		
Glencliff	1	Upson County	30286	
Glencoe	1	Camden County		
Glen Cove	1	Bibb County		
Glendale	1	Richmond County	30901	
Glenhaven	1	Bibb County		
Glen Haven	1	DeKalb County	30032	
Glenloch	1	Heard County	30217	
Glenloch Village	1	Fayette County	30269	
Glenmore	1	Ware County	31501	
Glenn	1	Heard County	30217	
Glenns	1	Muscogee County		
Glennville	1	Tattnall County	30427	
Glenwood	1	Floyd County	30161	
Glenwood	1	Wheeler County	30428	
Glenwood Hills	1	DeKalb County	30032	
Glidden	1	Bibb County		
Glory	1	Berrien County		
Gloster	1	Gwinnett County	30245	
Glovers Millpond	1	Glascock County		
Gloverton	1	Coweta County		
Glynco	1	Glynn County	31520	
Glynn Camp	1	Glynn County		
Glynn Haven	1	Glynn County	31522	
Goat Town	1	Washington County	31082	
Gobblers Hill	1	Chattahoochee County	31805	
Gober	1	Cherokee County	30107	
Godfrey	1	Morgan County	30650	
Godwinsville	1	Dodge County	31023	
Goffs Mill	1	Randolph County		
Goggins	1	Lamar County	30204	
Gold Kist	1	Effingham County		
Goldmine	1	Hart County	30520	
Gold Ridge	1	Cherokee County	30114	
Goldsboro	1	Bleckley County	31014	
Goldson	1	Taylor County	31006	
Goloid	1	Screven County		
Goodes	1	Fulton County	30268	
Good Hope	1	Walton County	30641	
Goolsby	1	Jasper County		
Goose Island	1	Gilmer County	30522	
Goose Neck	1	Pulaski County		
Gorday	1	Worth County	31791	
Gordon	1	Wilkinson County	31031	
Gordon Airport	1	DeKalb County		
Gordon Road	1	Fulton County	30310	
Gordon Springs	1	Whitfield County	30740	
Gordonston	1	Chatham County		
Gordy	1	Worth County	31791	
Gore	1	Chattooga County	30747	
Goshen	1	Lincoln County		
Goss	1	Elbert County	30635	
Gough	1	Burke County	30811	
Graball	1	Lincoln County		
Gracewood	1	Richmond County	30812	
Grady	1	Polk County	30125	
Graham	1	Appling County	31513	
Grandview	1	Pickens County		
Grange	1	Jefferson County	30434	
Grangerville	1	Wayne County		
Granite Hill	1	Hancock County	31087	
Granite Spur	1	Madison County		
Grantville	1	Coweta County	30220	
Grassdale	1	Bartow County		
Gratis	1	Walton County	30655	
Graves	1	Terrell County	31742	
Gray	1	Jones County	31032	
Gray Hill	1	Troup County	31833	
Graymont	1	Emanuel County	30471	
Grayson	1	Gwinnett County	30221	
Graysville	1	Catoosa County	30726	
Greely	1	Cherokee County	30183	
Green Acres	1	Catoosa County	30741	
Green Acres	1	Chatham County		
Green Acres	1	Clarke County	30601	
Green Acres Estate	1	Laurens County	31021	
Greenberry Crossroads	1	Jones County		
Greenbriar	1	Fulton County	30331	
Green Island Hills	1	Muscogee County		
Greenough	1	Mitchell County	31716	
Greensboro	1	Greene County	30642	
Greens Crossing	1	Lowndes County	31641	
Greens Cut	1	Burke County	30908	
Greens Mill	1	Fannin County	30513	
Greens Mill	1	Talbot County		
Greenville	1	Camden County	31548	
Greenville	1	Meriwether County	30222	
Greenway	1	Emanuel County	30441	
Greenway	1	Fulton County	30075	
Greenwood	1	Henry County	30253	
Greenwood	1	Lanier County		
Greenwood	1	Mitchell County	31730	
Greenwood Forest	1	Clinch County	31649	
Greggs	1	Cook County		
Gregory	1	Murray County		
Gresham Park	1	DeKalb County	30316	
Gresham Road	1	Cobb County	30062	
Greshamville	1	Greene County	30650	
Gresston	1	Dodge County	31023	
Greyfield	1	Camden County		
Griffin	1	Spalding County	30223	
Griffith	1	Lamar County		
Grimball Park	1	Chatham County	31406	
Grimshaw	1	Bulloch County		
Griswoldville	1	Jones County	31201	
Grizzletown	1	Bartow County	30101	
Grogan	1	Peach County		
Grooverville	1	Brooks County	31626	
Grovania	1	Houston County	31036	
Groveland	1	Bryan County	31321	
Groveland	1	Chatham County		
Groveland Park	1	Bibb County		
Grove Level	1	Jackson County		
Grove Park	1	Chatham County	31406	
Grove Park	1	Fulton County		
Grove Point	1	Chatham County	31405	
Grovetown	1	Columbia County	30813	
Grubbs	1	Chatham County		
Guild	1	Walker County	30728	
Gumbranch	1	Liberty County	31313	
Gumlog	1	Franklin County		
Gum Log	1	Union County	30512	
Gum Springs	1	Bartow County		
Guysie	1	Bacon County	31510	
Guyton	1	Effingham County	31312	
Habersham	1	Habersham County	30544	
Haddock	1	Jones County	31033	
Haddonville	1	Effingham County		
Hagan	1	Evans County	30429	
Hahira	1	Lowndes County	31632	
Halcyondale	1	Screven County	30467	
Halfmoon Landing	1	Liberty County	31320	
Halifax	1	Camden County		
Hall Mill	1	Walker County		
Halls	1	Bartow County	30145	
Hallwood	1	Putnam County	31024	
Halycon Bluff	1	Chatham County	31401	
Hamer	1	Chatham County		
Hamilton	1	Harris County	31811	
Hamilton Crossroads	1	McDuffie County		
Hammett	1	Crawford County	31078	
Hampton	1	Henry County	30228	
Hancock	1	Hancock County		
Handy	1	Coweta County	30263	
Haney	1	Floyd County	30124	
Hanlin	1	Paulding County		
Hannah	1	Douglas County	30187	
Hannahs Mill	1	Upson County	30286	
Hannatown	1	Decatur County	31717	
Hanover	1	Decatur County		
Hapeville	1	Fulton County	30354	
Happy Hollow	1	Bartow County	31084	
Haralson	2	Coweta County	30229	
Haralson	2	Meriwether County	30229	
Harbin	1	Gwinnett County	30620	
Harco	1	Harris County		
Hard Cash	1	Elbert County		
Harding	1	Tift County	31794	
Hardwick	1	Baldwin County	31034	
Hardys Crossroads	1	Jasper County		
Harlem	1	Columbia County	30814	
Harllee	1	Putnam County	31061	
Harlow	1	Laurens County		
Harmony	1	Cherokee County		
Harmony	1	Putnam County	31024	
Harmony Church	1	Muscogee County	31905	
Harp	1	Fayette County		
Harrietts Bluff	1	Camden County	31569	
Harrington	1	Glynn County	31522	
Harris	1	Meriwether County	30222	
Harrisburg	1	Baldwin County		
Harrisburg	1	Walker County	30747	
Harris City	1	Meriwether County		
Harrison	1	Madison County		
Harrison	1	Washington County	31035	
Harrisons Mill	1	Clay County		
Harrisonville	1	Richmond County		
Harrisonville	1	Troup County	30230	
Harrock Hall	1	Chatham County	31406	
Harryat	1	Cobb County		
Hartford	1	Pulaski County	31036	
Hartley	1	Peach County		
Harts	1	Glascock County		
Hartsfield	1	Colquitt County	31756	
Hartwell	1	Hart County	30643	
Harvest	1	Habersham County	30523	
Haskins	1	Laurens County	31022	
Haskins Crossing	1	Laurens County		
Hassler Mill	1	Whitfield County	30740	
Hasslers Mill	1	Murray County		
Hastings	1	Clayton County		
Hasty	1	Ware County		
Hatcher	1	Quitman County	31754	
Hatley	1	Crisp County	31015	
Hawkins	1	Walker County		
Hawkins Crossroads	1	Talbot County		
Hawkinstown	1	Baker County		
Hawkinsville	1	Pulaski County	31036	
Haylow	1	Echols County	31630	
Hayner	1	Glynn County		
Hayneville	1	Houston County	31036	
Hayston	1	Newton County	30255	
Haysville	1	Walker County		
Haywood	1	Ware County		
Hazard	1	Washington County		
Hazlehurst	1	Camden County		
Hazlehurst	1	Jeff Davis County	31539	
Headlight	1	Clinch County		
Head River	1	Dade County	30709	
Heardmont	1	Elbert County		
Heard Place	1	Stewart County		
Heardville	1	Forsyth County	30130	
Hebardville	1	Ware County	31501	
Hebron	1	Banks County		
Hebron	1	Washington County		
Hedges	1	Walker County		
Heidrich	1	Washington County		
Helen	1	White County	30545	
Helena	2	Telfair County	31037	
Helena	2	Wheeler County	31037	
Hemp	1	Fannin County	30560	
Henderson	1	Houston County	31025	
Henderson Still	1	Atkinson County		
Hendricks	1	Upson County	30286	
Henry	1	Atkinson County		
Hentown	1	Early County	31723	
Hephzibah	1	Richmond County	30815	
Herbert Smart Downtown Municipal Airport	1	Bibb County		
Hermitage	1	Floyd County		
Herndon	1	Jenkins County	30441	
Herndonville	1	Walton County		
Herod	1	Terrell County	31742	
Hiawassee	1	Towns County	30546	
Hickman Forks	1	Upson County		
Hickory Bluff	1	Camden County	31565	
Hickory Flat	1	Banks County	30554	
Hickory Flat	1	Cherokee County	30114	
Hickory Level	1	Carroll County	30117	
Hickory Ridge	1	Bibb County		
Hickox	1	Brantley County	31553	
Hicks	1	Macon County		
Higdon	1	Fannin County	30541	
Higdon Mill	1	Gilmer County		
Higgins Mill	1	Monroe County		
Higgston	1	Montgomery County	30410	
Highfalls	1	Monroe County	30233	
Highland Circle	1	Bibb County		
Highland Heights	1	Lowndes County	31601	
Highland Mills	1	Spalding County	30223	
Highland Park	1	Chatham County	31406	
Highland Park	1	Muscogee County		
Highland Pines	1	Muscogee County	31808	
High Point	1	Camden County		
High Point	1	Newton County	30209	
High Point	1	Walker County	30707	
High Shoals	2	Morgan County	30645	
High Shoals	2	Walton County	30645	
Hightower	1	Forsyth County	30130	
Hill City	1	Gordon County	30735	
Hillcrest	1	Troup County	30240	
Hillman	1	Taliaferro County	30631	
Hills	1	Habersham County	30523	
Hillsboro	1	Jasper County	31038	
Hillsdale	1	Tift County		
Hillside Cottages	1	Fulton County		
Hills Park	1	Fulton County		
Hills Store	1	Burke County		
Hilltonia	1	Screven County	30467	
Hilltop	1	Pike County		
Hilton	1	Early County	31723	
Hilton Heights	1	Muscogee County		
Hiltonia	1	Screven County	30467	
Hilyer	1	Troup County	30240	
Hinesville	1	Liberty County	31313	
Hinkles	1	Walker County	30738	
Hinsonton	1	Mitchell County	31765	
Hinton	1	Pickens County	30143	
Hiram	1	Paulding County	30141	
Hi Roc Shores	1	Rockdale County	30207	
Hix	1	Madison County		
Hobbs	1	Walker County		
Hobby	1	Turner County	31714	
Hoboken	1	Brantley County	31542	
Hogan	1	Oglethorpe County		
Hogansville	1	Troup County	30230	
Hog Mountain	1	Gwinnett County	30518	
Holbrook	1	Cherokee County	30130	
Holcomb	1	Pickens County		
Holcomb Bridge	1	Fulton County	30076	
Holders	1	Jackson County		
Holland	1	Chattooga County	30730	
Hollingsworth	1	Banks County	30510	
Hollis	1	Thomas County	31778	
Hollonville	1	Pike County	30292	
Holly Hills	1	Muscogee County		
Holly Spring	1	Bartow County		
Holly Springs	1	Cherokee County	30142	
Holly Springs	1	Jackson County	30558	
Hollywood	1	Habersham County	30524	
Holmes	1	Dooly County		
Holt	1	Calhoun County		
Holt	1	Irwin County	31774	
Holton	1	Bibb County		
Homeland	1	Charlton County	31539	
Homer	1	Banks County	30547	
Homerville	1	Clinch County	31634	
Homestead	1	Pierce County		
Honora	1	Lincoln County	30817	
Hood	1	Union County		
Hooker	1	Dade County	30752	
Hooper	1	Haralson County		
Hopeful	1	Mitchell County	31730	
Hopeulikit	1	Bulloch County	30461	
Hopewell	1	Camden County		
Hopewell	1	Cherokee County	30114	
Hopewell	1	Fulton County		
Hopewell	1	Harris County	31822	
Hopkins	1	Ware County		
Horns	1	Crawford County	31078	
Horse Ford	1	Long County		
Horseleg Estates	1	Floyd County	30161	
Horseshoe Bend	1	Heard County		
Hortense	1	Brantley County	31543	
Hoschton	1	Jackson County	30548	
Hothouse	1	Fannin County		
Houston	1	Heard County		
Houston Avenue	1	Bibb County		
Houston Heights	1	Bibb County		
Houston Lake	1	Houston County	31047	
Howard	1	Taylor County	31039	
Howards Mill	1	Early County		
Howell	1	Columbia County		
Howell	1	Echols County	31636	
Howell Grove	1	Hancock County		
Howell Mill	1	Fulton County	30325	
Howells Transfer	1	Fulton County		
Huber	1	Twiggs County	31201	
Hubert	1	Bulloch County	30415	
Hub Junction	1	Newton County		
Hudson Mill	1	Harris County	31804	
Huffaker	1	Floyd County	30161	
Huffer	1	Coffee County	31533	
Hughland	1	Tattnall County	30438	
Hulett	1	Carroll County	30117	
Hull	1	Madison County	30646	
Hulmeville	1	Elbert County	30635	
Hunter	1	Screven County	30467	
Hunter Army Airfield	1	Chatham County	31409	
Hunters	1	Screven County		
Hunters Crossroad	1	Meriwether County		
Huntington	1	Sumter County	31709	
Hunts Corner	1	Gordon County		
Hurst	1	Fannin County	30561	
Hutchins	1	Oglethorpe County	30630	
Hutchinson Island	1	Chatham County		
Huxford	1	McIntosh County		

== See also ==
- Georgia (U.S. state)
- List of counties in Georgia (U.S. state)
- List of municipalities in Georgia (U.S. state)
