= New Home, Georgia =

Coordinates: 34°57′19″N 85°31′59″W

- Unincorporated community
- Country: United States
- State: Georgia
- County: Dade
- Time zone: UTC-5 (Eastern (EST))
  - Summer (DST): UTC-4 (EDT)
- ZIP codes: 30752
- Area codes: 706/762

New Home is a small unincorporated community in the most northwestern corner of Dade County, Georgia, United States. It is part of the Chattanooga, TN–GA Metropolitan Statistical Area. The community surrounds the ghost town of Cole City.

== Geography ==
New Home is located in the northwestern part of Georgia, it borders Alabama state line. Chattanooga is approximately 23 miles from the New Home community. Trenton is 15 miles from the community. Scottsboro, Alabama is about 60 miles away.

== See also ==
- National Register of Historic Places listings in Dade County, Georgia
- Northwest Georgia Joint Development Authority
- Town Line, New York, seceded from the United States (unrecognized) and rejoined in 1946.
