= National Register of Historic Places listings in Chattooga County, Georgia =

Map showing Chattooga County in Georgia

This is a list of properties and districts in Chattooga County, Georgia that are listed on the National Register of Historic Places (NRHP).

This National Park Service list is complete through NPS recent listings posted June 26, 2026.

== Current listings ==
	Name on the Register	Image	Date listed	Location	City or town	Description
1	Camp Juliette Low	Camp Juliette Low	September 1, 1987 (#87001431)	GA 157; 34°31′57″N 85°28′51″W	Cloudland	
2	Chattooga County Courthouse	Chattooga County Courthouse	September 18, 1980 (#80000988)	Courthouse Sq. 34°28′49″N 85°20′55″W	Summerville	
3	Georgia Site No. 9 CG 43		December 20, 1987 (#87002112)	Address Restricted	Summerville	
4	Paradise Gardens	Paradise Gardens	March 27, 2012 (#12000166)	200 N. Lewis Street; 34°30′47″N 85°19′00″W	Pennville	
5	Penn Place	Penn Place	September 29, 1988 (#88001828)	Penn Bridge Rd. 34°31′16″N 85°18′10″W	Trion	
6	Sardis Baptist Church	Sardis Baptist Church	August 21, 1997 (#97000862)	Junction of GA 114 and Sardis Church Rd. 34°21′09″N 85°26′37″W	Lyerly	
7	Summerville Commercial Historic District	Summerville Commercial Historic District	May 16, 2012 (#12000280)	Centered around Commerce St., Georgia, & Washington Aves. 34°28′48″N 85°20′54″W	Summerville	
8	Summerville Depot	Summerville Depot	January 29, 1992 (#91002037)	120 E. Washington Ave. 34°28′47″N 85°20′46″W	Summerville	

== Former listings ==
	Name on the Register	Image	Date listed	Date removed	Location	City or town	Description
6	Riegel Hospital		February 20, 2002 (#02000079)	June 29, 2026	194 Allgood St. 34°32′31″N 85°18′46″W	Trion	Demolished in 2010
