= New Salem, Georgia =

- Unincorporated community
- Interactive map of New Salem, Georgia
- Country: United States
- State: Georgia
- County: Dade
- Time zone: UTC-5 (Eastern (EST))
  - Summer (DST): UTC-4 (EDT)
- ZIP codes: 30738 and 30731
- Area codes: 706/423

New Salem is a small unincorporated community and voting precinct on Lookout Mountain that occupies the southeastern portion of Dade County, Georgia, United States. While rural, it is part of the Chattanooga, TN–GA Metropolitan Statistical Area. The community contains the historical New Salem School. The mountain portions of and main entrance into Cloudland Canyon State Park are located within the New Salem community as well.

== Geography ==
Dade County makes up the northwestern corner of Georgia, bordering Jackson and Dekalb Counties in Alabama to the west and south, Hamilton and Marion Counties in Tennessee to the north, and Walker County in Georgia to the east and south. Chattanooga is approximately 30 miles from the New Salem community, Trenton 15 miles, Scottsboro, Alabama about 43 miles away. The main highways through the community are state roads 136, 189, and a portion of 157. Dade and the western third of Walker County make up a small, geologically distinct part of Georgia referred to as the Appalachian Plateau, consisting of Sand, Lookout, and Pigeon Mountains and the valleys between them.

== See also ==
- National Register of Historic Places listings in Dade County, Georgia
- Northwest Georgia Joint Development Authority
- Town Line, New York, seceded from the United States (unrecognized) and rejoined in 1946.
