= Georgia State Route 157 =

State highway in Georgia, United States

State Route 157
- Hinkle Road
- SR 157 highlighted in red

Route information
- Maintained by GDOT
- Length: 39.1 mi (62.9 km)

Major junctions
- South end: SR 48 in Cloudland
- SR 136 southeast of Cloudland Canyon State Park; SR 189 in Lookout Mountain
- North end: SR 58 at the Tennessee state line in Lookout Mountain

Location
- Country: United States
- State: Georgia
- Counties: Chattooga, Walker, Dade

Highway system
- Georgia State Highway System; Interstate; US; State; Special
← SR 156	→ SR 158

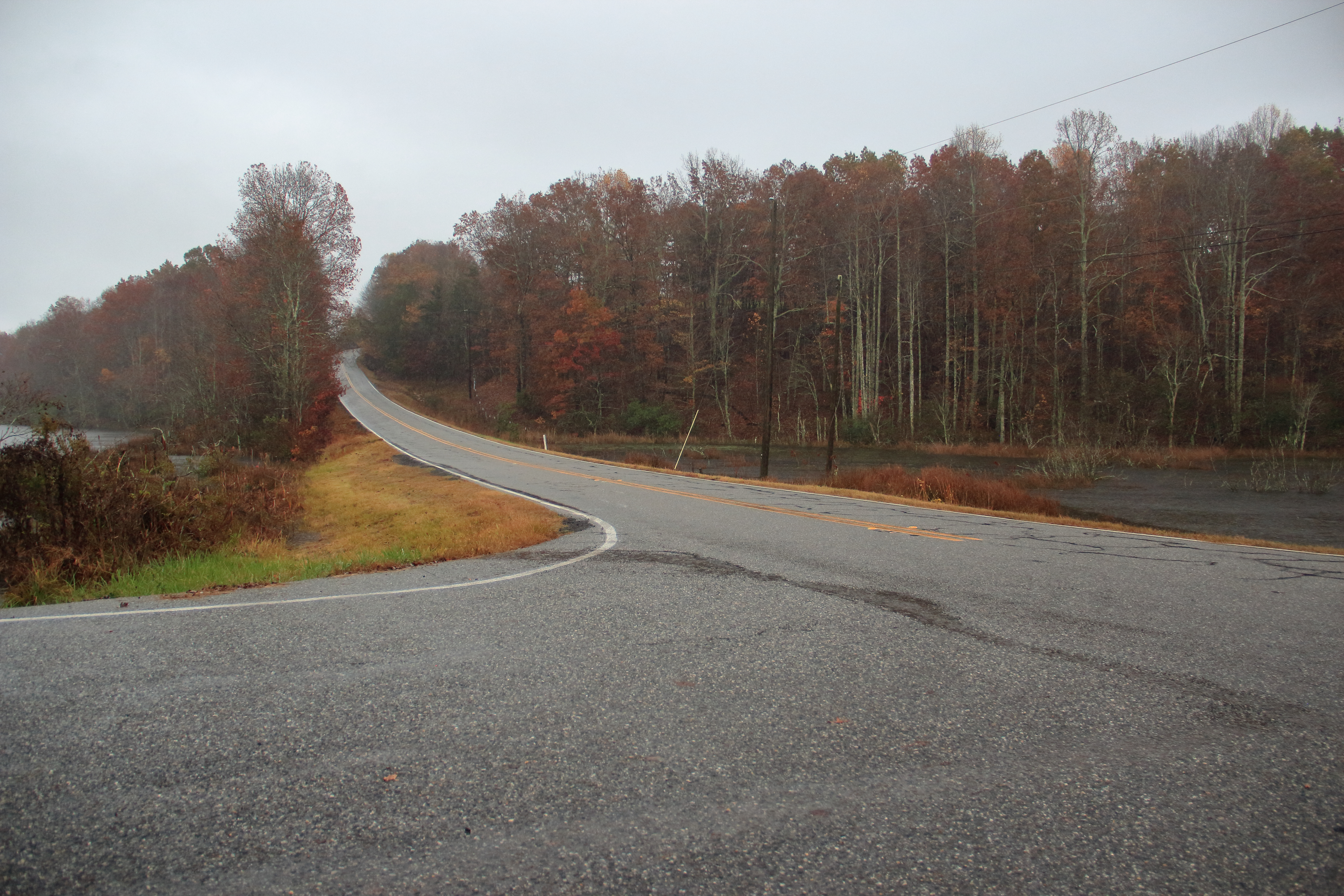
State Route 157 in Walker County

State Route 157 (SR 157) is a 39.1-mile-long (62.9 km) state highway that travels south-to-north through portions of Chattooga, Walker, and Dade counties in the northwestern part of the U.S. state of Georgia.

== Route description ==
SR 157 begins at an intersection with SR 48, northwest of Menlo, in the community of Cloudland, in Chattooga County. The road heads northeast into Walker County. It curves to the northwest and heads to the north-northeast. The highway has a brief foray into Dade County, before re-entering Walker County. Continuing on its north-northeast trek, it intersects SR 136, southeast of Cloudland Canyon State Park. SR 157 continues to the north-northeast and curves to the north-northwest to re-enter Dade County. The two routes run concurrent to the northeast. On the southwestern edge of Lookout Mountain, they cut across the eastern edge of Covenant College. They briefly run along the Dade–Walker county line, with SR 157 splitting off onto McFarland Road, back into Walker County. It briefly heads south on Lula Lake Road, before heading east on Red Riding Hood Trail. It curves to the northeast until it meets its northern terminus, Tennessee State Route 58, at the Tennessee state line. SR 157 is not part of the National Highway System.

== Major intersections ==
County	Location	mi	km	Destinations	Notes
Chattooga	Cloudland	0.0	0.0	SR 48 – Valley Head, Menlo	Southern terminus
Walker	No major junctions				
Dade	No major junctions				
Walker		23.2	37.3	SR 136 (Lookout Mountain Scenic Highway) – Trenton, LaFayette	
Dade		34.5	55.5	SR 189 south	Southern end of SR 189 concurrency
Dade–Walker county line	Lookout Mountain	38.2	61.5	SR 189 north	Northern end of SR 189 concurrency
Walker	Lookout Mountain	39.1	62.9	SR 58 north (Ochs Highway) – Chattanooga	Northern terminus; roadway continues into Tennessee as SR 58.
1.000 mi = 1.609 km; 1.000 km = 0.621 mi: Concurrency terminus
