= Flint Hill =

Flint Hill can refer to:

== Places ==
In the United States

- Flint Hill, Georgia, an unincorporated community
- Flint Hill, Missouri, a town
- Flint Hill, Ralls County, Missouri, an unincorporated community
- Scottville, North Carolina, United States, formerly called Flint Hill
- Flint Hill, Virginia (disambiguation), the name for multiple places in Virginia
  - Flint Hill School, in Virginia

Elsewhere

- Flint Hill, County Durham, England
