= Alpine, Georgia =

Alpine
- Unincorporated community
- Location in Georgia Location in the United States
- Coordinates: 34°27′21″N 85°29′30″W
- Country: United States
- State: Georgia
- County: Chattooga

Alpine is an unincorporated community in Chattooga County, in the U.S. state of Georgia. The community is located on the northwest side of the Broomtown Valley in northwest Georgia, southeast of Menlo. It is on Georgia Route 337 north of Alpine Creek.

== History ==
The community was named after the Swiss Alps on account of its lofty elevation. A post office called Alpine was established in 1843, and remained in operation until 1900. A Civil War skirmish occurred near the town site in 1863.
