= Georgia State Route 48 =

State highway in Georgia, United States

State Route 48
- SR 48 highlighted in red

Route information
- Maintained by GDOT
- Length: 12.6 mi (20.3 km)

Major junctions
- West end: SR 117 at the Alabama state line northwest of Cloudland
- SR 157 in Cloudland; SR 337 in Menlo
- East end: US 27 / SR 1 in Summerville

Location
- Country: United States
- State: Georgia
- Counties: Chattooga

Highway system
- Georgia State Highway System; Interstate; US; State; Special
← SR 47	→ SR 49

State Route 48 (SR 48) is a 12.6-mile-long (20.3 km) east–west state highway located entirely in Chattooga County in the northwestern part of the U.S. state of Georgia. The highway connects the Alabama state line with Summerville, via Cloudland and Menlo.

== Route description ==
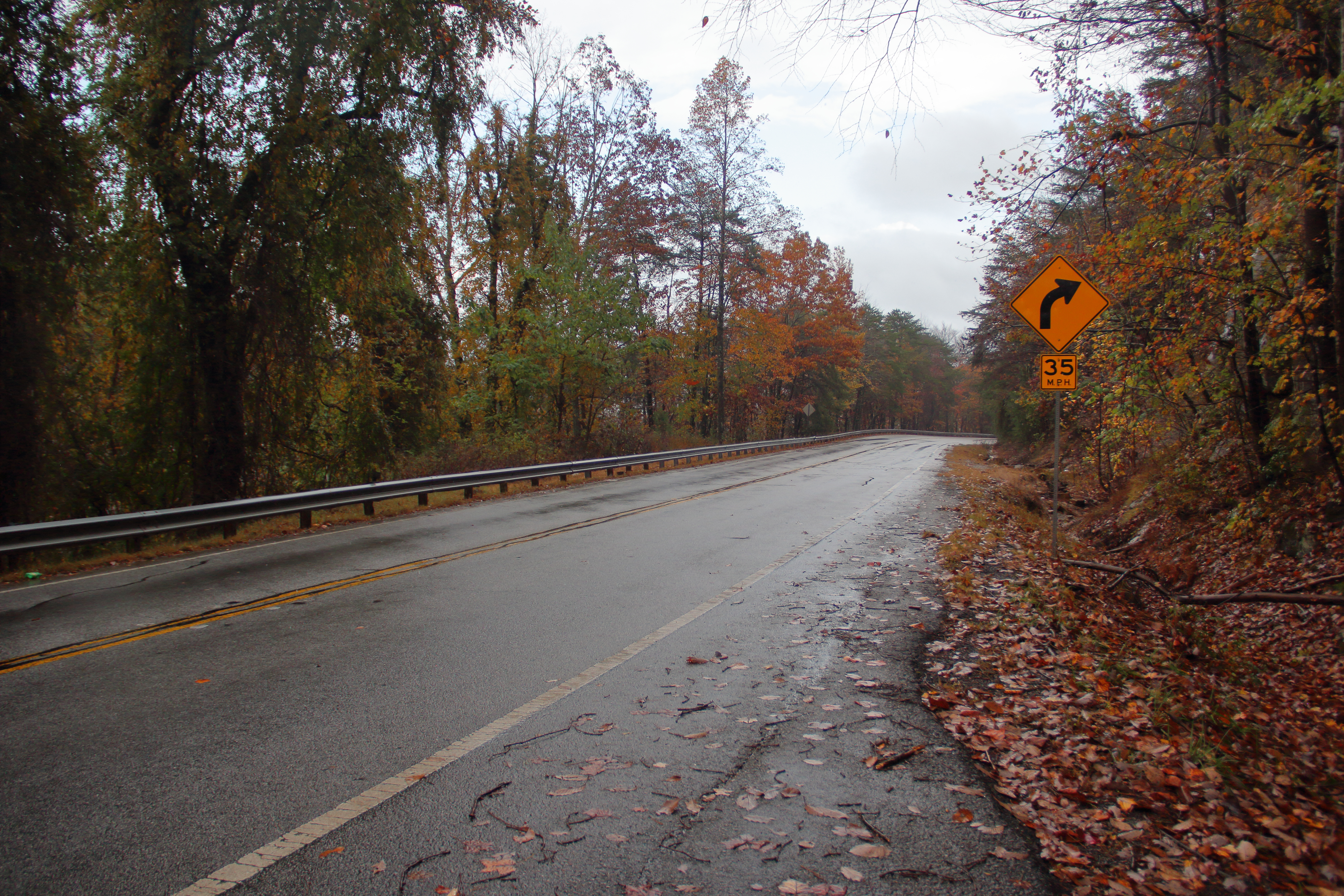
Georgia State Route 48 near Cloudland

SR 48 begins at the Alabama state line, where the roadway continues as Alabama State Route 117. This is located northwest of Cloudland. SR 48 travels southeast, into Cloudland, where it has an intersection with the southern terminus of SR 157. SR 48 then curves to the town of Menlo, where it intersects SR 337 (7th Avenue). SR 48 continues east, through rural areas of the county, to Summerville, where it meets its eastern terminus, an intersection with US 27/SR 1 in downtown.

While the route is short, SR 48 is a somewhat important route in the area. Between Menlo and Summerville, the route sees an Average Annual Daily Traffic (AADT) over 5,000 vehicles.

== Major intersections ==
The entire route is in Chattooga County.

Location	mi	km	Destinations	Notes
	0.0	0.0	SR 117 north – Mentone	Continuation beyond Alabama state line
Cloudland	1.5	2.4	SR 157 north / Gadsden Avenue south – Trenton	Southern terminus of SR 157; northern terminus of Gadsden Avenue
Menlo	4.6	7.4	SR 337 (7th Avenue) – LaFayette	
Summerville	12.6	20.3	US 27 / SR 1 (Commerce Street) – Rome, LaFayette, Trion, Paradise Garden	Eastern terminus
1.000 mi = 1.609 km; 1.000 km = 0.621 mi
