= Eastville =

Eastville may refer to:

== Australia ==
- Eastville, Victoria, Shire of Loddon and Shire of Mount Alexander, Victoria, Australia

== Canada ==
- Eastville, Nova Scotia, Canada

== United Kingdom ==
- Eastville, Bristol, England
  - Eastville Stadium, the former home of Bristol Rovers FC
- Eastville, Lincolnshire, England

== United States ==
- Eastville, Georgia, USA
- Eastville, Virginia, USA
- Eastville, section of Sag Harbor
