= Teloga, Georgia =

Teloga Teloga Springs
- Unincorporated community
- Location in Georgia Location in the United States
- Coordinates: 34°33′36″N 85°24′35″W
- Country: United States
- State: Georgia
- County: Chattooga
- Named for: Teloga Creek

Teloga is an unincorporated community in Chattooga County, in the U.S. state of Georgia.

== History ==
The community takes its name from nearby Teloga Creek. A variant name is "Teloga Springs". The Teloga post office closed in 1927.
