= Subligna, Georgia =

Subligna
- Unincorporated community
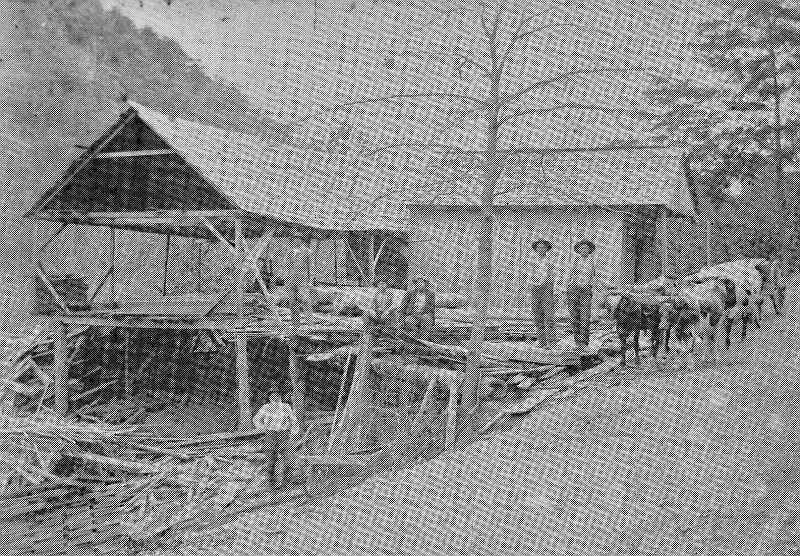
- Sawmill in Subligna, circa 1900

- Location in Georgia Location in the United States
- Coordinates: 34°33′36″N 85°11′15″W
- Country: United States
- State: Georgia
- County: Chattooga
- Settled: c. 1848
- Incorporated: 1870
- Disestablished: 1995

Subligna is an unincorporated community in Chattooga County, Georgia, United States.

== History ==
A post office was established at Subligna in 1848, and remained in operation until it was discontinued in 1953. The name honors a settler named Dr. William Dunlap Underwood, subligna being a Latin construct meaning "under wood".

The Georgia General Assembly incorporated Subligna as a town in 1870. The town's municipal charter was repealed in 1995.
