= West Brow, Georgia =

- Unincorporated community Census-designated place
- Location within Georgia Location within the United States
- Coordinates: 34°55′19″N 85°25′3″W
- Country: United States
- State: Georgia
- County: Dade

Area
  - Total: 2.61 sq mi (6.77 km^{2})
  - Land: 2.61 sq mi (6.77 km^{2})
  - Water: 0 sq mi (0.00 km^{2})
- Elevation: 1,844 ft (562 m)

Population (2020)
  - Total: 887
  - Density: 339.6/sq mi (131.11/km^{2})
- Time zone: UTC-5 (Eastern (EST))
  - Summer (DST): UTC-4 (EDT)
- ZIP Code: 30750 (Lookout Mountain)
- Area codes: 706/762
- FIPS code: 13-81488
- GNIS feature ID: 2812676

West Brow is an unincorporated community and census-designated place (CDP) on the eastern side of Dade County, Georgia, United States. It is on top of Lookout Mountain, along Georgia State Route 189, which leads northeast 5 miles (8 km) to the city of Lookout Mountain. Trenton, the Dade county seat, is 8 miles (13 km) to the southwest in the Lookout Valley.

The 2020 census listed a population of 887.

== Demographics ==
Historical population
Census	Pop.	Note	%±
2020	887		—
U.S. Decennial Census; 2020

West Brow was first listed as a census designated place in the 2020 census.

=== 2020 census ===
West Brow CDP, Georgia – Racial and ethnic composition Note: the US Census treats Hispanic/Latino as an ethnic category. This table excludes Latinos from the racial categories and assigns them to a separate category. Hispanics/Latinos may be of any race.
Race / Ethnicity (NH = Non-Hispanic)	Pop 2020	% 2020
White alone (NH)	794	89.52%
Black or African American alone (NH)	3	0.34%
Native American or Alaska Native alone (NH)	7	0.79%
Asian alone (NH)	7	0.79%
Pacific Islander alone (NH)	1	0.11%
Some Other Race alone (NH)	0	0.00%
Mixed Race or Multi-Racial (NH)	42	4.74%
Hispanic or Latino (any race)	33	3.72%
Total	887	100.00%

The ancestry was 9.4% English, 8.2% German, 7.7% Irish, 1.5% Scottish, 1.3% Polish, and 0.7% Norwegian.

The median age was 42.8 years old. 19.2% of the population were older than 65, with 10.1% between the ages of 65 and 74, and 9.1% between the ages of 75 and 84.

The median household income was $46,125, with non-families having $36,761. 2.1% of the population were in poverty.
