= Silver Hill, Georgia =

Silver Hill
- Unincorporated community
- Location in Georgia Location in the United States
- Coordinates: 34°24′06″N 85°18′26″W
- Country: United States
- State: Georgia
- County: Chattooga
- Elevation: 735 ft (224 m)
- GNIS feature ID: 333056

Silver Hill is an unincorporated community in Chattooga County, in the U.S. state of Georgia.

== History ==
A post office called Silver Hill was in operation from 1891 until 1899. The community supposedly was named from deposits of silver in the area.
