= Penn Place =

- U.S. National Register of Historic Places
- U.S. Historic district
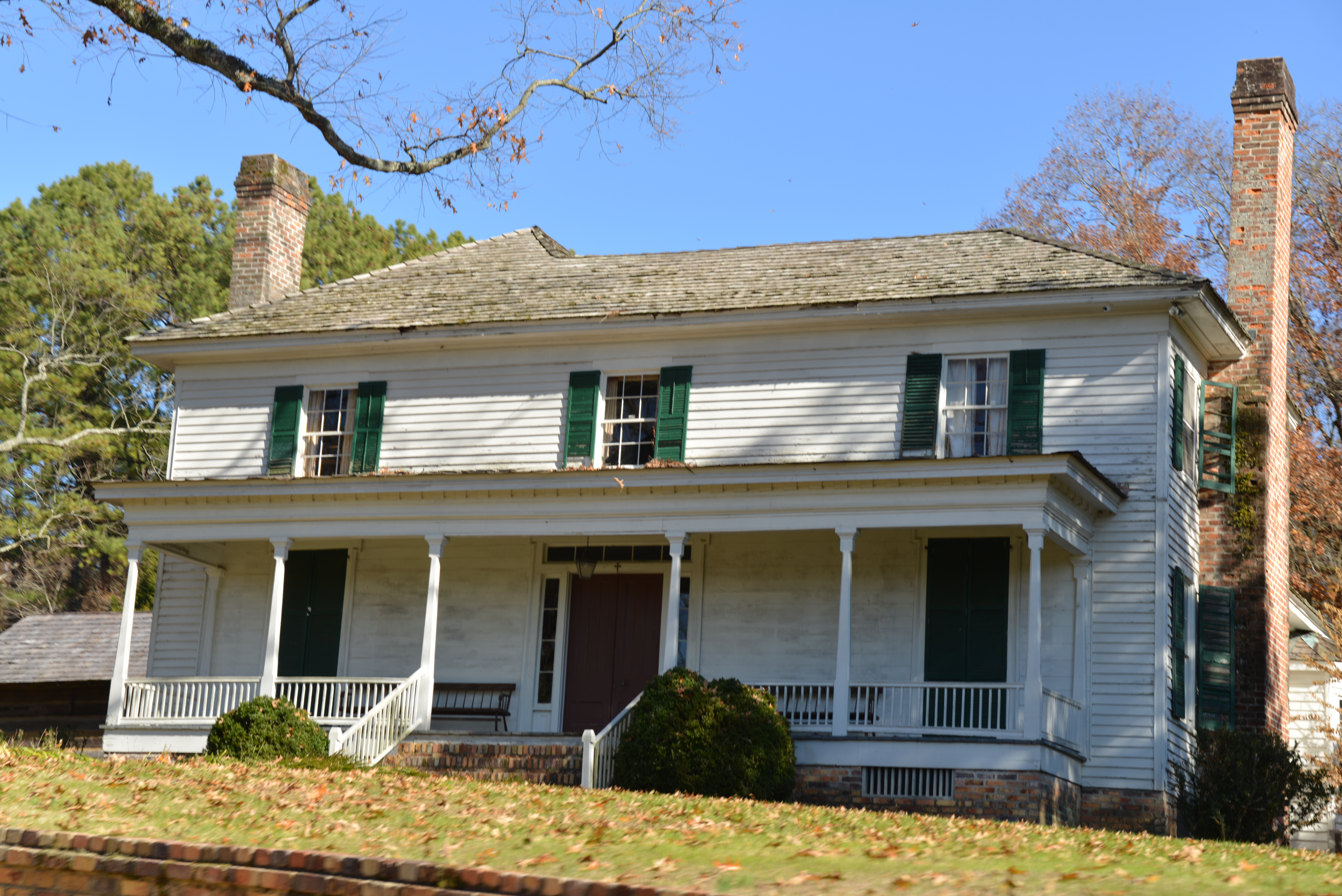
- Main house in 2019

- Location within Georgia
- Nearest city: Trion, Georgia
- Coordinates: 34.52105°N 85.30266°W
- Area: 275 acres (111 ha)
- Built: 1875
- Architectural style: Plantation Plain
- NRHP reference No.: 88001828
- Added to NRHP: September 29, 1988

Penn Place, located on Penn Bridge Rd. near Trion, Georgia in Chattooga County, Georgia, was listed on the National Register of Historic Places in 1988. The listing included two contributing buildings and seven contributing structures.

The main house is a two-story two-over-two house, with a first-floor porch across the front facade. Outbuildings include a smokehouse and a chicken house. A mule barn and a corn crib are located across Penn Bridge Road from the rest of the complex.
