= Morganville, Georgia =

Unincorporated community in Georgia, U.S.

Coordinates: 34°56′11″N 85°27′13″W

Morganville is an unincorporated community in Dade County, in the U.S. state of Georgia.

== History ==
A post office called Morganville was established in 1866, and remained in operation until 1913. The community was named after the local Morgan family of settlers.
