= Berryton, Georgia =

Berryton Raccoon
- Unincorporated community
- Location in Georgia Location in the United States
- Coordinates: 34°27′00″N 85°23′11″W
- Country: United States
- State: Georgia
- County: Chattooga
- Named for: John Berry

Berryton is an unincorporated community in Chattooga County, in the U.S. state of Georgia.

== History ==
Berryton was originally called "Raccoon" after a local textile mill of the same name. A post office called Berryton was established in 1910, and remained in operation until it was discontinued in 1956. The present name is after John Berry, proprietor of the mill.
