= Riegel Hospital =

Hospital in Trion, Georgia, US

- Riegel Community Hospital
- Formerly listed on the U.S. National Register of Historic Places
- Location within Georgia
- Nearest city: Trion, Georgia
- Coordinates: 34.5420°N 85.3128°W
- Built: 1924
- NRHP reference No.: 02000079

Significant dates
- Added to NRHP: February 20, 2002
- Removed from NRHP: June 29, 2026

Riegel Community Hospital, also known as Riegel Hospital, was an historic 1924 hospital at 194 Allgood Street in Trion, Georgia. It closed in 1975. It was added to the National Register of Historic Places on February 20, 2002. In 2010 the city of Trion sought to demolish the building, which was damaged by flooding and in need of roof repairs. It contained asbestos. The building was demolished.

The hospital was built by the Trion Manufacturing Co., a local denim mill, and served its workers; it was named after the mill's president, Benjamin Riegel. The property was donated to the city in the 1990s.

== See also ==
- National Register of Historic Places listings in Chattooga County, Georgia
