= Flint Hill, Virginia =

Flint Hill, Virginia may refer to:

- Flint Hill, Pittsylvania County, Virginia
- Flint Hill, Rappahannock County, Virginia
- Flint Hill School in Fairfax County
