= Flint Hill, Pittsylvania County, Virginia =

Unincorporated community in Virginia, US

Coordinates: 36°47′43″N 79°29′39″W

Flint Hill is an unincorporated community in Pittsylvania County, in the U.S. state of Virginia.
