= Menlo, Georgia =

- City
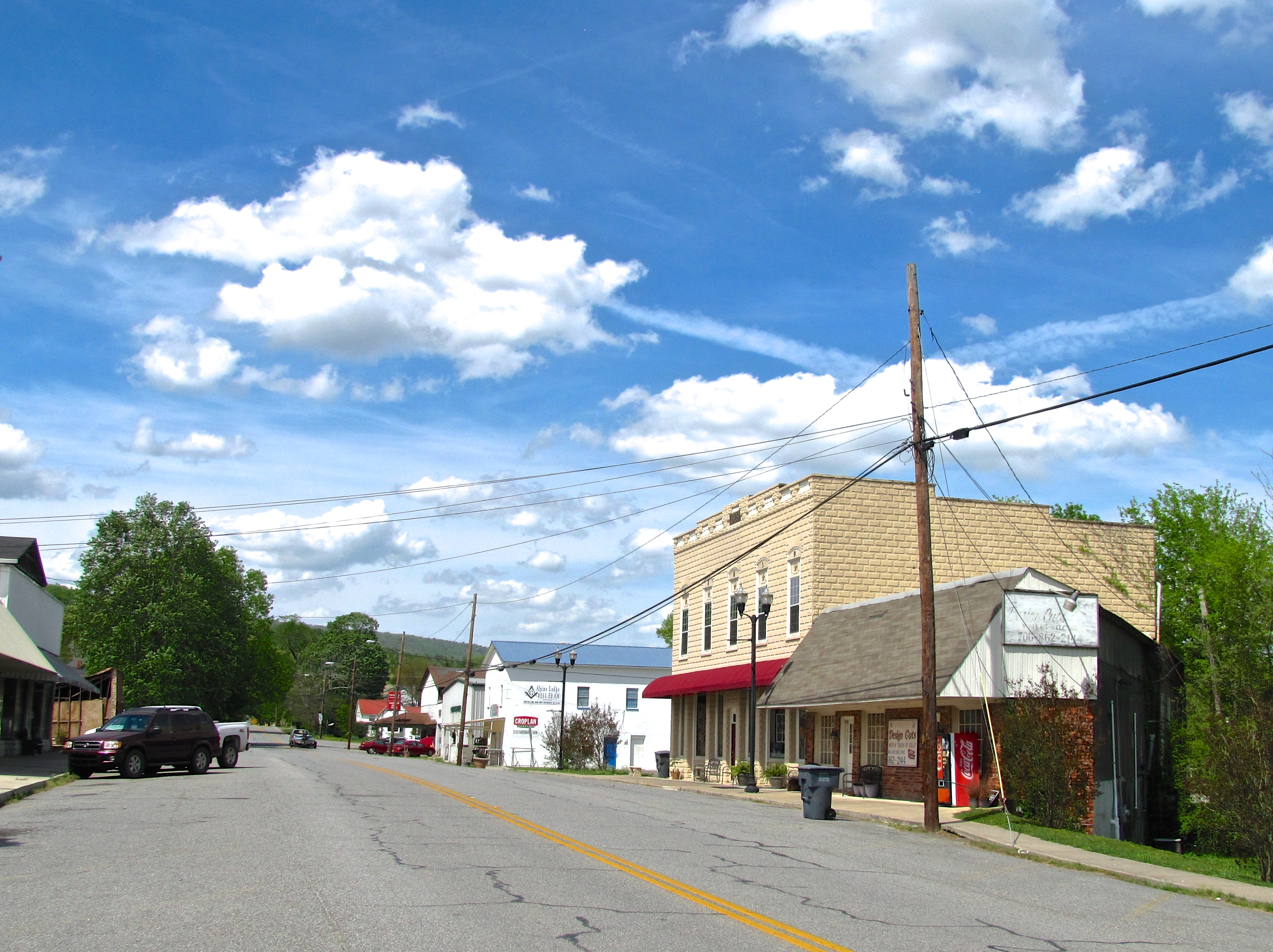
- Buildings along 7th Avenue (SR 337)

- Location in Chattooga County and the state of Georgia
- Coordinates: 34°29′6″N 85°28′34″W
- Country: United States
- State: Georgia
- County: Chattooga

Area
  - Total: 0.78 sq mi (2.03 km^{2})
  - Land: 0.78 sq mi (2.03 km^{2})
  - Water: 0 sq mi (0.00 km^{2})
- Elevation: 1,099 ft (335 m)

Population (2020)
  - Total: 480
  - Density: 613.0/sq mi (236.68/km^{2})
- Time zone: UTC-5 (Eastern (EST))
  - Summer (DST): UTC-4 (EDT)
- ZIP code: 30731
- Area codes: 706/762
- FIPS code: 13-50848
- GNIS feature ID: 0332373

Menlo is a small city in Chattooga County, Georgia, United States. The population was 480 at the 2020 census.

== History ==
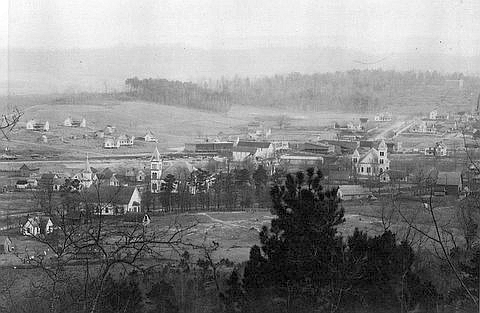
Menlo, circa 1900

Menlo was platted in 1883. A post office called Menlo has been in operation since 1886. The Georgia General Assembly incorporated Menlo as a town in 1903. The city's founder, Captain Andrew Lawrence, named it after Menlo Park, New Jersey, in honor of inventor Thomas Edison.

== Geography ==
Menlo is located at the base of the Cumberland Plateau in western Chattooga County. It lies just over a mile east of the Alabama border. Georgia State Route 48 runs through the center of town, leading east 8 miles (13 km) to Summerville, the Chattooga County seat, and northwest 3 miles (5 km) to Cloudland atop Lookout Mountain. SR 337 leads northeast through the Broomtown Valley 20 miles (32 km) to LaFayette.

According to the United States Census Bureau, Menlo has a total area of 0.77 square miles (2.0 km^{2}), all of it land.

== Demographics ==
Historical population
Census	Pop.	Note	%±
1910	376		—
1920	378		0.5%
1930	355		−6.1%
1940	414		16.6%
1950	453		9.4%
1960	466		2.9%
1970	593		27.3%
1980	611		3.0%
1990	538		−11.9%
2000	485		−9.9%
2010	474		−2.3%
2020	480		1.3%
U.S. Decennial Census

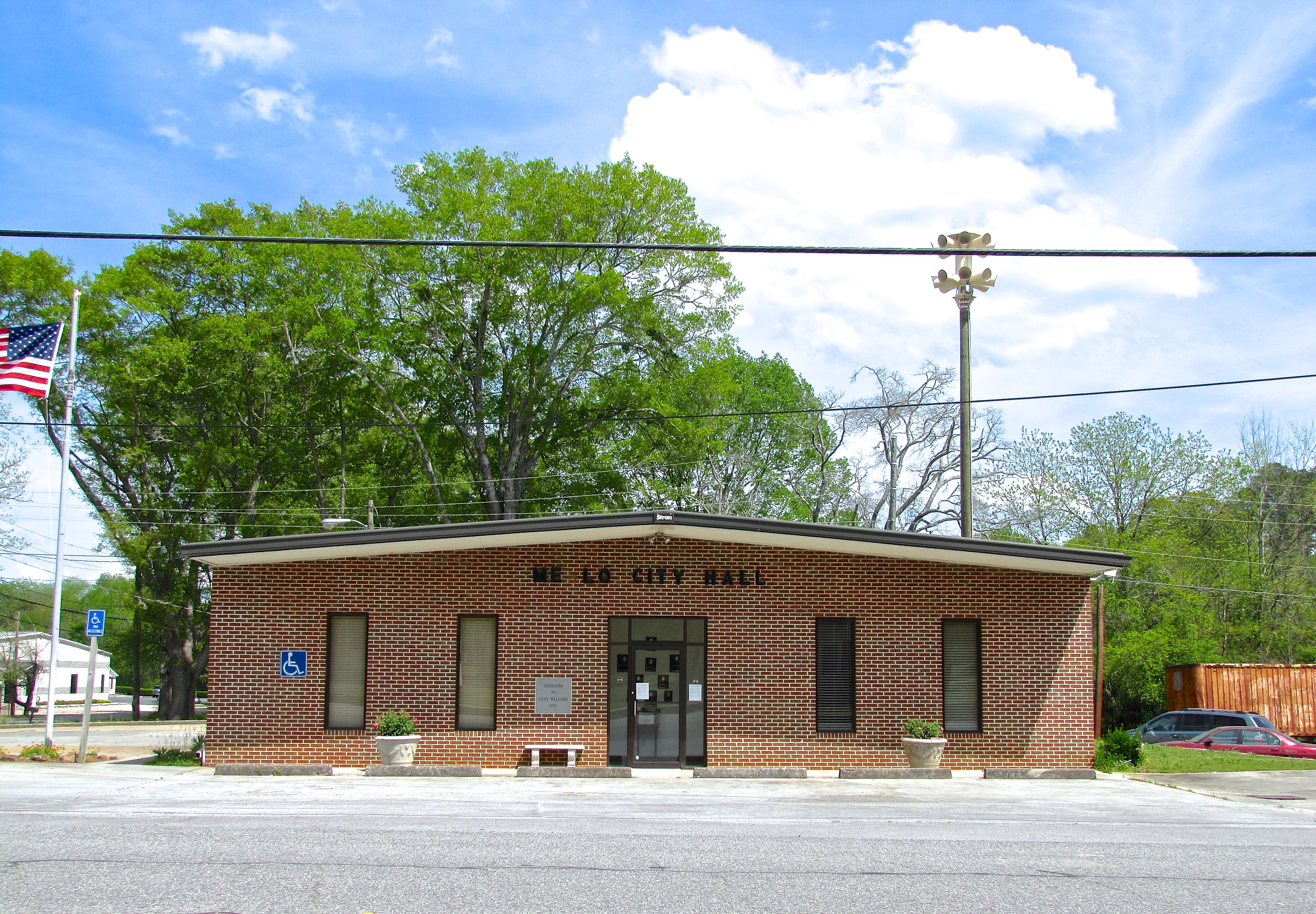
Menlo City Hall

As of the census of 2000, there were 485 people, 229 households, and 141 families residing in the city. The population density was 622.5 inhabitants per square mile (240.3/km^{2}). There were 251 housing units at an average density of 322.2 per square mile (124.4/km^{2}). The racial makeup of the city was 96.49% White, 3.30% African American, and 0.21% from two or more races. Hispanic or Latino of any race were 0.41% of the population.

There were 229 households, out of which 23.6% had children under the age of 18 living with them, 47.6% were married couples living together, 10.0% had a female householder with no husband present, and 38.4% were non-families. 36.7% of all households were made up of individuals, and 22.7% had someone living alone who was 65 years of age or older. The average household size was 2.12 and the average family size was 2.70.

In the city, the population was spread out, with 20.4% under the age of 18, 9.5% from 18 to 24, 21.4% from 25 to 44, 24.3% from 45 to 64, and 24.3% who were 65 years of age or older. The median age was 44 years. For every 100 females, there were 85.1 males. For every 100 females age 18 and over, there were 73.1 males.

The median income for a household in the city was $23,750, and the median income for a family was $32,143. Males had a median income of $25,417 versus $19,091 for females. The per capita income for the city was $12,994. About 12.5% of families and 17.6% of the population were below the poverty line, including 18.1% of those under age 18 and 22.4% of those age 65 or over.

== Commerce ==
The city lacks any major sources of commerce. The largest business is Best Glove, Inc., a medical and industrial glove supplier.
