= Greens Cut, Georgia =

Unincorporated community in Georgia, U.S.

Coordinates: 33°10′22″N 81°58′39″W

Greens Cut is an unincorporated community in Burke County, in the U.S. state of Georgia.

== History ==
A post office called Greens Cut was established in 1854, and remained in operation until 1926. The community took its name from a nearby railway cut, which in turn bears the name of Moses P. Green, original owner of the site.
