= Farmersville, Georgia =

Farmersville
- Unincorporated community
- Location in Georgia Location in the United States
- Coordinates: 34°29′10″N 85°13′51″W
- Country: United States
- State: Georgia
- County: Chattooga

Farmersville is an unincorporated community in Chattooga County, in the U.S. state of Georgia.

== History ==
A post office was established at Farmersville in 1853, and remained in operation until it was discontinued in 1866.
