= Eldorado, Georgia =

Human settlement in United States of America

Coordinates: 31°21′14″N 83°29′08″W

Eldorado is an unincorporated community in Tift County, in the U.S. state of Georgia.

== History ==
A variant name was "Fender". A post office called Fender was established in 1898, and remained in operation until 1959. The present name is derived from Spanish meaning "golden one".
