= Cole City, Georgia =

Ghost town in Dade County, Georgia, U.S.

Coordinates: 34°57′07″N 85°34′05″W

Cole City is an extinct town in Dade County, in the U.S. state of Georgia. The GNIS classifies it as a populated place. A variant name was "Cole".

== History ==
The Georgia General Assembly incorporated Cole City as a town in 1873, with municipal corporate limits extending in a two-mile (3.2 km) radius from the main entrance of the Dade Coal Company coal mine. The community was named after Colonel E. W. Cole. The town's charter was officially dissolved in 1995 along with those of many other inactive Georgia municipalities.

== See also ==
- List of ghost towns in Georgia
