= Dade County, Georgia =

County in Georgia, United States

- County
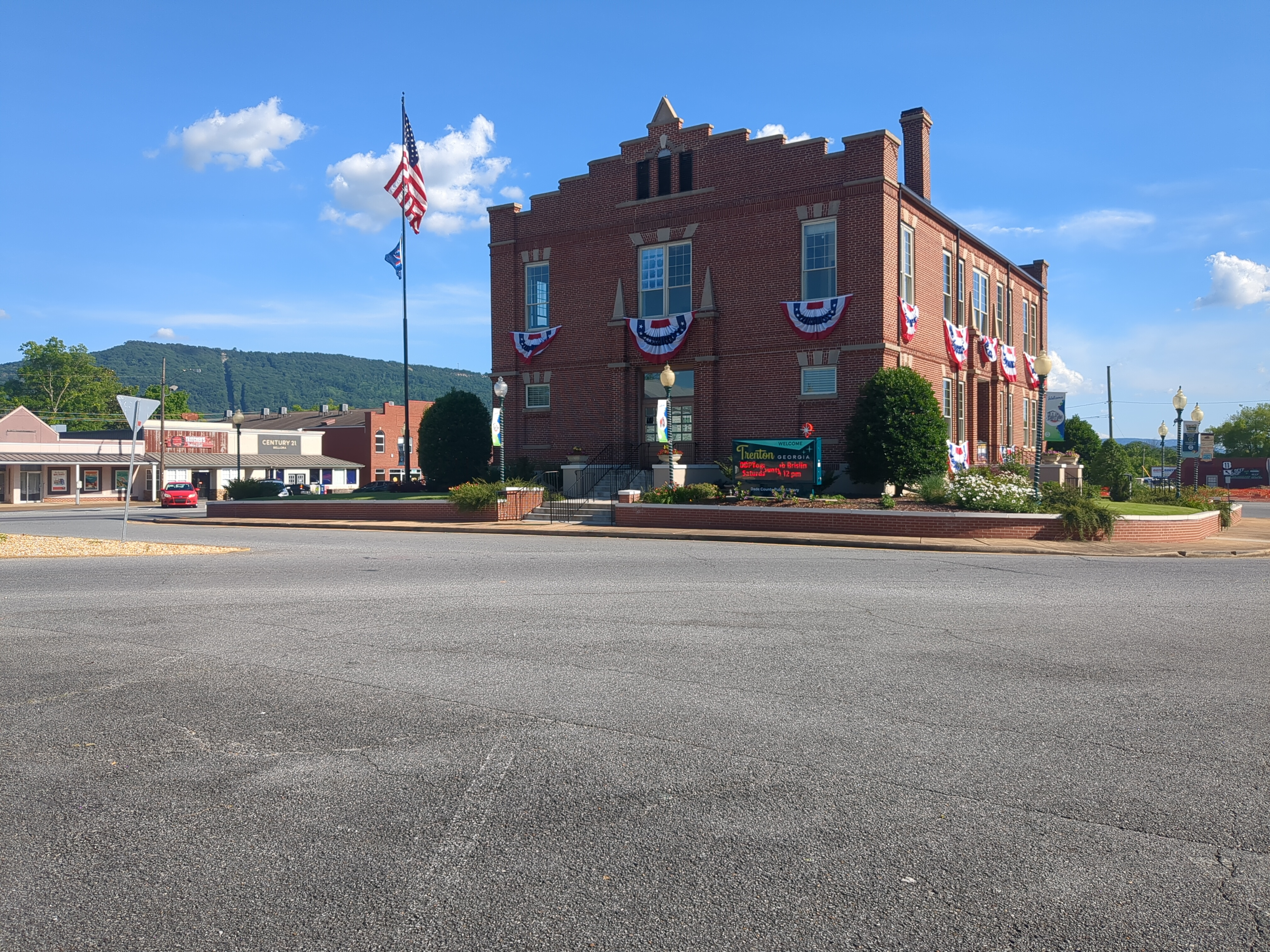
- Dade County Courthouse in Trenton

- Seal Logo

- Location within the U.S. state of Georgia
- Coordinates: 34°51′N 85°30′W
- Country: United States
- State: Georgia
- Founded: 1837; 189 years ago
- Named for: Francis L. Dade
- Seat: Trenton
- Largest city: Trenton

Area
  - Total: 174 sq mi (450 km^{2})
  - Land: 174 sq mi (450 km^{2})
  - Water: 0.2 sq mi (0.52 km^{2}) 0.1%

Population (2020)
  - Total: 16,251
  - Estimate (2025): 16,154 ▼
  - Density: 93.4/sq mi (36.1/km^{2})
- Time zone: UTC−5 (Eastern)
  - Summer (DST): UTC−4 (EDT)
- Congressional district: 14th
- Website: dadecounty-ga.gov

Dade County is a county in the U.S. state of Georgia. It occupies the northwest corner of Georgia, and the county's own northwest corner is the westernmost point in the state. As of the 2020 census, the population was 16,251. The county seat and only incorporated municipality is Trenton. Dade County is part of the Chattanooga metropolitan area. In 1860, residents of Dade County voted to secede from the state of Georgia and from the United States, but no government outside the county ever recognized this gesture as legal. In 1945, the county symbolically "rejoined" Georgia and the United States.

== History ==
Dade County, Georgia was created in 1837 from land that was cut from Walker County and was named for Major Francis Langhorne Dade, who was killed in the Dade battle by Seminole Indians in December 1835. The first settlers of Dade County won the land in the Georgia Land Lotteries, held to encourage settlement after the Cherokee people were forced off the land. Many settlers worked in regional coke and coal mines that contributed to development of the Chattanooga, Tennessee, area.

The area was long isolated by its geography of mountains and rivers, which some historians say contributed to early residents' separatist attitudes. For the first century of Dade County's existence, no road connected it directly to the rest of Georgia, so visitors from elsewhere in the state had to reach it by way of Alabama or Tennessee. That changed in 1939 with the establishment of Cloudland Canyon State Park, and Georgia began work on Highway 136 to connect U.S. 41 to the recently created park. The Civilian Conservation Corps built many of the facilities and access roads to the park.

Dade County had a short-lived state secessionist movement before the American Civil War. In 1860, county residents wanted to secede from the Union, but lawmakers for the state of Georgia were cautious. Legend has it that in 1860, the people of Dade County were so impatient that they announced their own secession from both Georgia and the United States. On July 4, 1945, a telegram from President Harry S. Truman was read at a celebration marking the county's "rejoining" the Union. Historians say Dade's individual secession and readmission were symbolic and had no legal effect. They say that officially, Dade County seceded along with the state of Georgia in 1861 and re-entered the Union with the state in 1870.

The noted Southern humorist, author and seminal writer of Southern humor George Washington Harris (1814–1869) is buried in the Brock Cemetery in Wildwood, GA. Although he greatly influenced the literary works of Mark Twain, William Faulkner, and Flannery O'Connor, his grave was not verified and given a marker until 2008.

In 1964, Covenant College established a campus at Lookout Mountain. Founded in 1955 in California, it was ready to expand after a year. Several professors led Covenant to move to St. Louis, Missouri, where it developed for eight years. After outgrowing its facilities there, the college decided to move to Dade County.

=== Quarter controversy ===
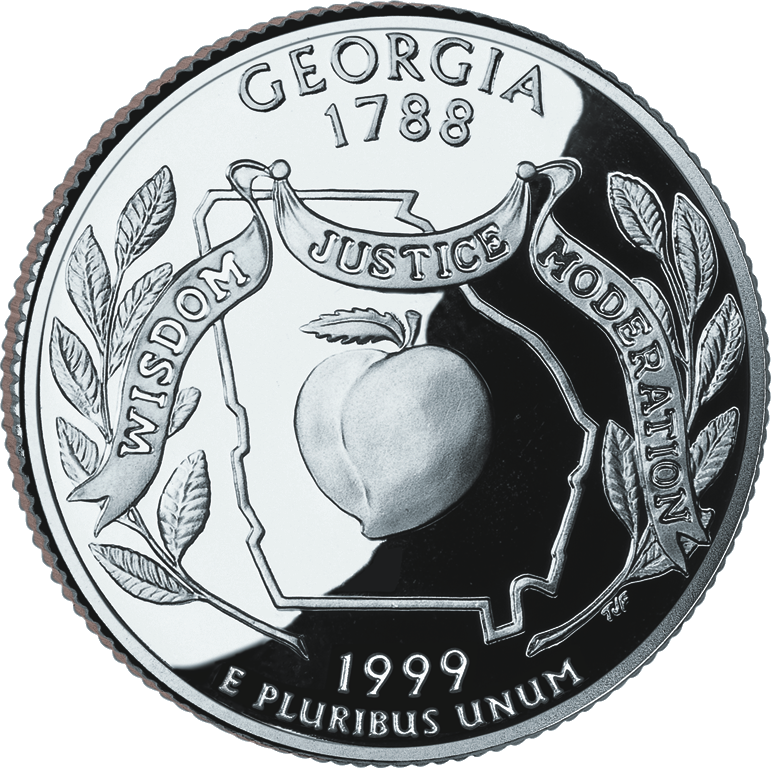
Georgia State Quarter without Dade County.

Shortly after the Georgia State Quarter was released by the US Mint, Dade County gained attention because of an apparent mistake in the design. As shown on the quarter, the state appears to lack Dade County, in the extreme northwestern part of the state. Some accounts in 2012 suggest the exclusion was intended to refer to the local legend of Dade County's secession from Georgia.

== Geography ==
According to the U.S. Census Bureau, the county has a total area of 174 square miles (450 km^{2}), of which 174 square miles (450 km^{2}) is land and 0.2 square miles (0.52 km^{2}) (0.1%) is water.

The county, like most of northwest Georgia, is entrenched in the southern Appalachian Mountains. In addition, a vast majority of the county is located in the Middle Tennessee-Chickamauga sub-basin of the Middle Tennessee-Hiwassee basin. A very small part of the southernmost tip of the county is located in the Upper Coosa River sub-basin in the ACT River Basin (Coosa-Tallapoosa River Basin), while a small part of the westernmost portion of Dade County is located in the Guntersville Lake sub-basin in the Middle Tennessee-Elk basin.

=== Major highways ===
- I-24 / SR 409 (unsigned)
- I-59 / SR 406 (unsigned)
- US 11 / SR 58
- SR 136
- SR 157
- SR 189
- SR 299
- SR 301

=== Adjacent counties ===
- Marion County, Tennessee (north/CST Border)
- Hamilton County, Tennessee (northeast)
- Walker County (southeast)
- DeKalb County, Alabama (southwest/CST Border)
- Jackson County, Alabama (west/CST Border)

=== Protected areas ===
- Chickamauga and Chattanooga National Military Park (part)
- Cloudland Canyon State Park

== Demographics ==
Historical population
Census	Pop.	Note	%±
1840	1,364		—
1850	2,680		96.5%
1860	3,069		14.5%
1870	3,033		−1.2%
1880	4,702		55.0%
1890	5,707		21.4%
1900	4,578		−19.8%
1910	4,139		−9.6%
1920	3,918		−5.3%
1930	4,146		5.8%
1940	5,894		42.2%
1950	7,364		24.9%
1960	8,666		17.7%
1970	9,910		14.4%
1980	12,318		24.3%
1990	13,147		6.7%
2000	15,154		15.3%
2010	16,633		9.8%
2020	16,251		−2.3%
2025 (est.)	16,154	▼	−0.6%
U.S. Decennial Census; 1790–1880 1890-1910; 1920-1930 1930-1940; 1940-1950 1960-1980; 1980-2000 2010 2020

=== Racial and ethnic composition ===
Dade County, Georgia – Racial and ethnic composition Note: the US Census treats Hispanic/Latino as an ethnic category. This table excludes Latinos from the racial categories and assigns them to a separate category. Hispanics/Latinos may be of any race.
Race / Ethnicity (NH = Non-Hispanic)	Pop 1980	Pop 1990	Pop 2000	Pop 2010	Pop 2020	% 1980	% 1990	% 2000	% 2010	% 2020
White alone (NH)	12,050	12,915	14,685	15,796	14,786	97.82%	98.24%	96.91%	94.97%	90.99%
Black or African American alone (NH)	109	101	96	142	141	0.88%	0.77%	0.63%	0.85%	0.87%
Native American or Alaska Native alone (NH)	14	42	67	65	68	0.11%	0.32%	0.44%	0.39%	0.42%
Asian alone (NH)	36	25	56	114	129	0.29%	0.19%	0.37%	0.69%	0.79%
Native Hawaiian or Pacific Islander alone (NH)	x	x	4	5	5	x	x	0.03%	0.03%	0.03%
Other race alone (NH)	3	0	1	24	31	0.02%	0.00%	0.01%	0.14%	0.19%
Mixed race or Multiracial (NH)	x	x	108	195	727	x	x	0.71%	1.17%	4.47%
Hispanic or Latino (any race)	106	64	137	292	364	0.86%	0.49%	0.90%	1.76%	2.24%
Total	12,318	13,147	15,154	16,633	16,251	100.00%	100.00%	100.00%	100.00%	100.00%

=== 2020 Census ===
As of the 2020 census, the county had a population of 16,251. The median age was 41.3 years. 20.1% of residents were under the age of 18 and 19.6% of residents were 65 years of age or older. For every 100 females there were 96.6 males, and for every 100 females age 18 and over there were 94.2 males age 18 and over. 5.4% of residents lived in urban areas, while 94.6% lived in rural areas.

The racial makeup of the county was 91.7% White, 0.9% Black or African American, 0.5% American Indian and Alaska Native, 0.8% Asian, 0.0% Native Hawaiian and Pacific Islander, 0.8% from some other race, and 5.3% from two or more races. Hispanic or Latino residents of any race comprised 2.2% of the population.

There were 6,354 households in the county, of which 28.1% had children under the age of 18 living with them and 25.2% had a female householder with no spouse or partner present. About 27.4% of all households were made up of individuals and 12.7% had someone living alone who was 65 years of age or older.

There were 7,387 housing units, of which 14.0% were vacant. Among occupied housing units, 74.4% were owner-occupied and 25.6% were renter-occupied. The homeowner vacancy rate was 1.6% and the rental vacancy rate was 8.9%.

=== 2010 census ===
As of the 2010 United States census, there were 16,633 people, 6,291 households, and 4,462 families living in the county. The population density was 95.6 inhabitants per square mile (36.9/km^{2}). There were 7,305 housing units at an average density of 42.0 per square mile (16.2/km^{2}). The racial makeup of the county was 96.0% white, 0.9% black or African American, 0.7% Asian, 0.4% American Indian, 0.1% Pacific islander, 0.6% from other races, and 1.3% from two or more races. Those of Hispanic or Latino origin made up 1.8% of the population. In terms of ancestry, 21.2% were American, 18.1% were Irish, 11.4% were German, and 9.4% were English.

Of the 6,291 households, 31.6% had children under the age of 18 living with them, 56.2% were married couples living together, 10.4% had a female householder with no husband present, 29.1% were non-families, and 25.1% of all households were made up of individuals. The average household size was 2.49 and the average family size was 2.96. The median age was 39.0 years.

The median income for a household in the county was $39,760 and the median income for a family was $48,881. Males had a median income of $41,618 versus $26,521 for females. The per capita income for the county was $20,168. About 10.7% of families and 15.5% of the population were below the poverty line, including 25.8% of those under age 18 and 10.8% of those age 65 or over.

=== 2000 census ===
As of the census of 2000, there were 15,154 people, 5,633 households, and 4,264 families living in the county. The population density was 87 inhabitants per square mile (34/km^{2}). There were 6,224 housing units at an average density of 36 per square mile (14/km^{2}). The racial makeup of the county was 97.51% White, 0.63% Black or African American, 0.49% Native American, 0.38% Asian, 0.03% Pacific Islander, 0.20% from other races, and 0.76% from two or more races. 0.90% of the population were Hispanic or Latino of any race.

There were 5,633 households, out of which 33.30% had children under the age of 18 living with them, 62.70% were married couples living together, 9.50% had a female householder with no husband present, and 24.30% were non-families. 21.70% of all households were made up of individuals, and 8.20% had someone living alone who was 65 years of age or older. The average household size was 2.55 and the average family size was 2.97.

In the county, the population was spread out, with 23.80% under the age of 18, 11.80% from 18 to 24, 27.80% from 25 to 44, 24.50% from 45 to 64, and 12.00% who were 65 years of age or older. The median age was 36 years. For every 100 females there were 96.00 males. For every 100 females age 18 and over, there were 91.80 males.

The median income for a household in the county was $35,259, and the median income for a family was $39,481. Males had a median income of $31,534 versus $21,753 for females. The per capita income for the county was $16,127. About 7.50% of families and 9.70% of the population were below the poverty line, including 7.40% of those under age 18 and 12.50% of those age 65 or over.

== Recreation ==
- Chickamauga and Chattanooga National Military Park
- Cloudland Canyon State Park
- Dade County Sports Complex
- Jenkins Park & Playground
- Town Creek Trail
- Trenton City Pool
- Veterans Memorial Park

== Georgia water supply ==
Dade County lies just south of Nickajack Lake on the Tennessee River, which was created by the Nickajack Dam, constructed by the Tennessee Valley Authority. The city of Atlanta, Georgia wanted to gain rights to the water in Nickajack Lake to supplement their sources from Lake Lanier and Lake Allatoona. In addition, in 2008 Georgia lawmakers wanted to change the Tennessee-Georgia state line, as they say it is based on a flawed 1818 survey, which mistakenly placed Georgia's northern line just short of the Tennessee River. Changing the boundary would give Georgia rights to the water, but they were unsuccessful.

== Politics ==
As of the 2020s, Dade County is a strongly Republican voting county, voting 82% for Donald Trump in 2024. Although it contained many opponents of the Confederacy during the Civil War, Dade County – unlike more easterly Fannin, Towns, Pickens and Gilmer – is a typical "Solid South" county in its political history. It voted Democratic in every presidential election until 1964, when the county turned towards conservative Republican Barry Goldwater. Since then, only twice has a Republican presidential candidate lost Dade County: when segregationist former and future Alabama Governor George Wallace carried the county in 1968 and when favorite son Jimmy Carter won in 1976. In 1972, Dade was Richard Nixon's strongest county nationwide in his 2,900-plus-county landslide over George McGovern. Dade County has voted Republican in every presidential candidate since 1980.

Dade County is part of District 53 for elections to the Georgia State Senate. Dade County is part of District 1 for elections to the Georgia House of Representatives. Dade County is part of the Georgia's 14th congressional district which is represented by Clay Fuller.

United States presidential election results for Dade County, Georgia
Year	Republican		Democratic		Third party(ies)	
Year	No.	%	No.	%	No.	%
1912	18	5.16%	287	82.23%	44	12.61%
1916	25	3.61%	616	88.89%	52	7.50%
1920	114	18.75%	494	81.25%	0	0.00%
1924	119	16.06%	563	75.98%	59	7.96%
1928	328	42.00%	453	58.00%	0	0.00%
1932	103	11.61%	770	86.81%	14	1.58%
1936	127	12.89%	857	87.01%	1	0.10%
1940	151	13.33%	982	86.67%	0	0.00%
1944	169	15.20%	943	84.80%	0	0.00%
1948	338	16.68%	1,488	73.45%	200	9.87%
1952	686	34.61%	1,296	65.39%	0	0.00%
1956	723	45.59%	863	54.41%	0	0.00%
1960	909	49.08%	943	50.92%	0	0.00%
1964	1,378	52.84%	1,227	47.05%	3	0.12%
1968	613	18.27%	282	8.41%	2,460	73.32%
1972	2,110	93.45%	148	6.55%	0	0.00%
1976	1,388	38.02%	2,263	61.98%	0	0.00%
1980	2,114	53.81%	1,735	44.16%	80	2.04%
1984	2,750	70.51%	1,150	29.49%	0	0.00%
1988	2,539	69.16%	1,120	30.51%	12	0.33%
1992	2,191	45.61%	1,782	37.09%	831	17.30%
1996	2,295	49.16%	1,737	37.21%	636	13.62%
2000	3,333	66.01%	1,628	32.24%	88	1.74%
2004	4,368	69.83%	1,823	29.14%	64	1.02%
2008	4,703	73.01%	1,612	25.02%	127	1.97%
2012	4,471	73.94%	1,411	23.33%	165	2.73%
2016	5,051	79.41%	965	15.17%	345	5.42%
2020	6,066	81.46%	1,261	16.93%	120	1.61%
2024	6,804	82.98%	1,343	16.38%	53	0.65%

United States Senate election results for Dade County, Georgia2
Year	Republican		Democratic		Third party(ies)	
Year	No.	%	No.	%	No.	%
2020	5,871	80.07%	1,253	17.09%	208	2.84%
2020	5,227	82.21%	1,131	17.79%	0	0.00%

United States Senate election results for Dade County, Georgia3
Year	Republican		Democratic		Third party(ies)	
Year	No.	%	No.	%	No.	%
2020	3,088	43.15%	461	6.44%	3,608	50.41%
2020	5,227	82.47%	1,111	17.53%	0	0.00%
2022	4,698	80.71%	996	17.11%	127	2.18%
2022	4,195	82.32%	901	17.68%	0	0.00%

Georgia Gubernatorial election results for Dade County
Year	Republican		Democratic		Third party(ies)	
Year	No.	%	No.	%	No.	%
2022	4,969	85.03%	807	13.81%	68	1.16%

== Communities ==
=== Cities ===
- Trenton

=== Census-designated places ===
- New England
- West Brow
- Wildwood

=== Other unincorporated communities ===
- Head River
- Hooker
- Morganville
- New Home
- New Salem
- Rising Fawn
- Davis

=== Ghost towns ===
- Cole City
- Tatum

== Notable people from Dade County ==
- The Forester Sisters

== See also ==
- National Register of Historic Places listings in Dade County, Georgia
- Northwest Georgia Joint Development Authority
- Town Line, New York, seceded from the United States (unrecognized) and rejoined in 1946.
- List of counties in Georgia
