= Georgia State Route 337 =

Highway in Georgia, United States

State Route 337
- Broomtown Road
- SR 337 highlighted in red

Route information
- Maintained by GDOT
- Length: 22.7 mi (36.5 km)
- Existed: June 1, 1963–present

Major junctions
- South end: CR 99 at the Alabama state line southwest of Menlo
- SR 48 in Menlo
- North end: US 27 / SR 1 south of LaFayette

Location
- Country: United States
- State: Georgia
- Counties: Chattooga, Walker

Highway system
- Georgia State Highway System; Interstate; US; State; Special
← SR 336	→ SR 338

State Route 337 (SR 337) is a 22.7-mile-long (36.5 km) state highway that travels southwest-to-northeast in the northwestern part of the U.S. state of Georgia. It travels from the Alabama state line southwest of Menlo, where the roadway continues as Cherokee County Road 99, northeastward through Broomtown Valley at the foot of Lookout Mountain. The route reaches its northern terminus at US 27/SR 1 south of LaFayette, though the route previously terminated in LaFayette.

== Route description ==
SR 337 begins at the Alabama state line, southwest of Menlo, where the roadway continues as Cherokee County Route 99 (CR 99). SR 337 travels northeast to Menlo, where it has an intersection with SR 48. After leaving Menlo, SR 337 travels to the northeast through rural areas of Chattooga and Walker counties. Approximately 500 feet (150 m) after the intersection with South Industrial Loop, the highway enters the southwestern part of the city limits of LaFayette. In town, the route turns right onto North Industrial Loop, then left onto Shattuck Industrial Boulevard. At the intersection with Foster Mill Drive, SR 337 leaves the city limits of LaFayette. The highway curves to the southeast and meeting its northern terminus, an intersection with US 27/SR 1 (South Main Street) south of the city.

SR 337 is not part of the National Highway System, a system of roadways important to the nation's economy, defense, and mobility.

== History ==
SR 337 was established between 1960 and 1963. It entered the state farther to the north than it currently does, traveling along Jamestown Road, and through the western part of Menlo; then, it continued to LaFayette as it does today. By 1966, it was rerouted to the east, through Menlo, along Edison Street, and turned northeast at Mitchell Road. By 1978, the highway was rerouted in Menlo, to follow 7th Avenue and Menlo–LaFayette Road, as it does today. In 1988, SR 337 was rerouted throughout the southern part of LaFayette, along its current routing.

== Major intersections ==
County	Location	mi	km	Destinations	Notes
Chattooga		0.0	0.0	CR 99 (Cherokee County Road 99)	Continuation beyond Alabama state line
Chattooga	Menlo	2.9	4.7	SR 48 – Trenton, Summerville	
Walker		22.7	36.5	US 27 / SR 1 (South Main Street)	
1.000 mi = 1.609 km; 1.000 km = 0.621 mi
