= Eagle Cliff, Georgia =

Unincorporated community in Georgia, U.S.

Coordinates: 34°55′42″N 85°21′10″W

Eagle Cliff is an unincorporated community in Walker County, in the U.S. state of Georgia.

== History ==
A post office called Eagle Cliff was established in 1860, and remained in operation until it was discontinued in 1904. The community took its name from a nearby cliff where eagles made their nests.
