= Fish Creek, Georgia =

Unincorporated community in Georgia, U.S.

Coordinates: 34°00′36″N 085°07′54″W

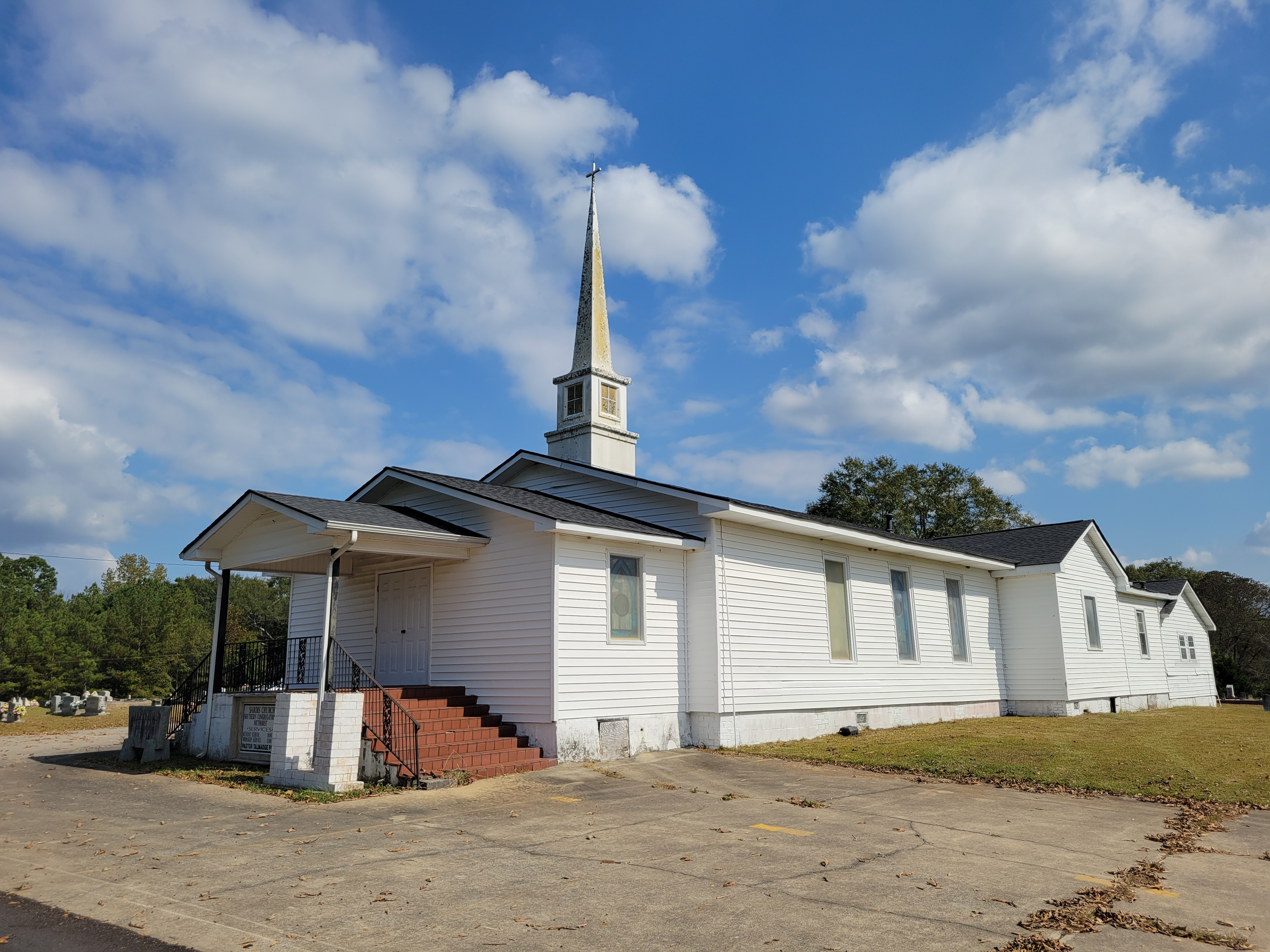
Sardis Methodist Church

Fish Creek (also known as Fish or Fish Creek Station) is an unincorporated community in Polk County, Georgia, United States.

== History ==
A post office was established as Fish in 1874, and remained in operation until it was discontinued in 1934. The community took its name from nearby Fish Creek. Congressman Robert W. Everett lived in Fish while he served in Congress.
