= Head River, Georgia =

Unincorporated community in Georgia, U.S.

Coordinates: 34°39′25″N 85°30′27″W

Head River is an unincorporated community in Dade County, in the U.S. state of Georgia.

== History ==
The first permanent settlement at Head River was made in the 1830s. A post office called Head River was established in 1913, and remained in operation until 1959.
