= Holland, Georgia =

Holland Holland's Store
- Unincorporated community
- Location in Georgia Location in the United States
- Coordinates: 34°21′07″N 85°22′21″W
- Country: United States
- State: Georgia
- County: Chattooga
- Named for: Charles I. Holland

Holland is an unincorporated community in Chattooga County, in the U.S. state of Georgia.

== History ==
The community was named after Charles I. Holland, an early postmaster. An early variant name was "Holland's Store" after its local country store. A post office was established as Holland's Store in 1879, the name was changed to Holland in 1889, and the post office closed in 1953.
