= Pennville, Georgia =

Pennville
- Unincorporated community
- Location in Georgia Location in the United States
- Coordinates: 34°30′44″N 85°19′17″W
- Country: United States
- State: Georgia
- County: Chattooga

Pennville is an unincorporated community in Chattooga County, in the U.S. state of Georgia.

== History ==
The community was named for the local Penn family, the original owner of the town site.
