= Fincherville, Georgia =

Unincorporated community in Georgia, U.S.

Coordinates: 33°24′33″N 83°57′12″W

Fincherville is an unincorporated community in Butts County, in the U.S. state of Georgia.

== History ==
A post office called Fincherville was established in 1895, and remained in operation until 1901. The community was named after John Lumpkin Fincher, a pioneer citizen.
