= Gumlog, Georgia =

Gumlog, Georgia G.M.D 213
- Unincorporated community Census-designated place
- Motto: Land of Spirits
- Location in Franklin County and the state of Georgia
- Coordinates: 34°30′16.4″N 83°6′16.4″W
- Country: United States
- State: Georgia
- County: Franklin

Area
  - Total: 16.10 sq mi (41.71 km^{2})
  - Land: 13.49 sq mi (34.94 km^{2})
  - Water: 2.61 sq mi (6.77 km^{2})
- Elevation: 732 ft (223 m)

Population (2020)
  - Total: 2,358
  - Density: 174.8/sq mi (67.49/km^{2})
- Time zone: UTC-5 (Eastern (EST))
  - Summer (DST): UTC-4 (EDT)
- FIPS code: 13-35814
- GNIS feature ID: 1867242

Gumlog is an unincorporated lakeside community and census-designated place in Franklin County, Georgia, United States. As of the 2020 census, Gumlog had a population of 2,358.

== Geography ==
Gumlog is located in the northeast corner of Franklin County at primary coordinate point 34°30′16.4″N 83°6′16.4″W (34.504556, -83.104556). It consists of extensive residential neighborhoods along the shores of Lake Hartwell on the Savannah River. The northeast border of the CDP is the centerline of the main stem of the lake, which also forms the state line with South Carolina. To the northwest, the CDP is bordered by Stephens County, and to the southeast it is bordered by Hart County. The southern edge of the CDP follows Interstate 85, and the southwest corner of the CDP borders the city of Lavonia. Access from I-85 is from Exit 173 (Georgia Highway 17) in Lavonia.

According to the United States Census Bureau, the Gumlog CDP has a total area of 16.1 square miles (41.6 km^{2}), of which 13.4 square miles (34.8 km^{2}) is land and 2.6 square miles (6.8 km^{2}), or 16.32%, is water. Tugaloo State Park occupies a peninsula on Lake Hartwell in the eastern part of the CDP.

Georgia Highway 328, known locally as Gumlog Road, is nearly the only way in and out of the community of Gumlog. It is 10 miles (16 km) long and crosses over the Gumlog Cove branch of Lake Hartwell. Gumlog Road runs from Highway 59 in Lavonia to a junction with Highway 17 in Avalon. Gumlog Creek also starts near the same junction in Avalon. Avalon was going to be named "Gumlog" after Gumlog Creek, but when the charter came back from the State Legislature, the name had been changed instead to Avalon.

== Demographics ==
Historical population
Census	Pop.	Note	%±
1990	1,436		—
2000	2,025		41.0%
2010	2,146		6.0%
2020	2,358		9.9%
U.S. Decennial Census; 1850-1870 1870-1880; 1890-1910 1920-1930; 1940 1950 1960; 1970 1980 1990; 2000 2010 2020

Gumlog first appeared as a census designated place in the 1990 U.S. census.

=== Racial and ethnic composition ===
Gumlog, Georgia – Racial and ethnic composition Note: the US Census treats Hispanic/Latino as an ethnic category. This table excludes Latinos from the racial categories and assigns them to a separate category. Hispanics/Latinos may be of any race.
Race / Ethnicity (NH = Non-Hispanic)	Pop 2000	Pop 2010	Pop 2020	% 2000	% 2010	2020
White alone (NH)	1,872	1,951	2,106	92.44%	90.91%	89.31%
Black or African American alone (NH)	89	113	83	4.40%	5.27%	3.52%
Native American or Alaska Native alone (NH)	17	6	0	0.84%	0.28%	0.00%
Asian alone (NH)	0	7	5	0.00%	0.33%	0.21%
Pacific Islander alone (NH)	0	0	0	0.00%	0.00%	0.00%
Some Other Race alone (NH)	3	0	10	0.15%	0.00%	0.42%
Mixed Race or Multi-Racial (NH)	13	40	81	0.64%	1.86%	3.44%
Hispanic or Latino (any race)	31	29	73	1.53%	1.35%	3.10%
Total	2,025	2,146	2,358	100.00%	100.00%	100.00%

=== 2020 census ===
As of the 2020 census, Gumlog had a population of 2,358. The median age was 50.1 years. 17.9% of residents were under the age of 18 and 24.5% of residents were 65 years of age or older. For every 100 females there were 100.2 males, and for every 100 females age 18 and over there were 99.1 males age 18 and over.

0.0% of residents lived in urban areas, while 100.0% lived in rural areas.

There were 1,027 households in Gumlog, of which 20.1% had children under the age of 18 living in them. Of all households, 50.3% were married-couple households, 20.6% were households with a male householder and no spouse or partner present, and 24.8% were households with a female householder and no spouse or partner present. About 31.0% of all households were made up of individuals and 16.1% had someone living alone who was 65 years of age or older.

There were 1,580 housing units, of which 35.0% were vacant. The homeowner vacancy rate was 3.3% and the rental vacancy rate was 12.6%.

=== 2000 census ===
As of the census of 2000, there were 2,025 people, 849 households, and 625 families residing in the CDP. The population density was 149.0 inhabitants per square mile (57.5/km^{2}). There were 1,430 housing units at an average density of 105.2 per square mile (40.6/km^{2}). The racial makeup of the community was 92.69% White, 4.40% African American, 0.94% Native American, 1.14% from other races, and 0.84% from two or more races. Hispanic or Latino of any race were 1.53% of the population.

There were 849 households, out of which 26.1% had children under the age of 18 living with them, 61.6% were married couples living together, 7.8% had a female householder with no husband present, and 26.3% were non-families. 23.0% of all households were made up of individuals, and 9.7% had someone living alone who was 65 years of age or older. The average household size was 2.39 and the average family size was 2.78.

In the CDP, the population was spread out, with 20.2% under the age of 18, 6.7% from 18 to 24, 25.9% from 25 to 44, 30.4% from 45 to 64, and 16.7% who were 65 years of age or older. The median age was 43 years. For every 100 females, there were 97.9 males. For every 100 females age 18 and over, there were 98.9 males.

The median income for a household in the CDP was $39,609, and the median income for a family was $42,813. Males had a median income of $29,405 versus $25,139 for females. The per capita income for the CDP was $20,859. About 6.0% of families and 6.9% of the population were below the poverty line, including 6.5% of those under age 18 and 5.2% of those age 65 or over.

== Historical notes ==
=== Toponymy ===
Some say Gumlog is an amateur translation of the Indian name "tsilalu hi", meaning "Sweet-Gum Settlement." Others say the name comes from the sweet-gum tree logs early settlers used for benches when they held their first court referred to as the Gum Log Court.

=== First court in Franklin County ===
In 1785, the Yazoo land fraud caused the state of Georgia to surrender its claim on what is now Alabama and Mississippi. South Carolina took advantage of the situation to move the boundary with Georgia from the main branch of the Keowee River to the Tugaloo branch, absorbing some Franklin County territory. Like other Georgia counties at the time, Franklin County had to decide which land claims were legitimate and which were fraudulent. The first county court was held at the home of Warren Philpot on Gumlog Creek. George Walton, a signer of the Declaration of Independence, was the court's chief justice. The assistant justices were Jesse Walton, Benjamin Cleveland, Larkin Cleveland, and John Gorham.

=== Attractions ===
- Tugaloo State Park
- Lake Hartwell
- I-85 Welcome Center
