= Hayston, Georgia =

Unincorporated community in Georgia, U.S.

Coordinates: 33°31′09″N 83°46′04″W

Hayston is an unincorporated community in Newton County, in the U.S. state of Georgia.

== History ==
A post office was established at Hayston in 1893, and remained in operation until 1957. The community was named after its resident postmaster, Alexander S. Hays.
