= Teloga Creek =

Stream in Georgia, U.S.

Coordinates: 34°34′41.30″N 85°21′26.85″W

Teloga Creek is a stream in the U.S. state of Georgia.

Teloga is a name derived from the Muscogee language meaning "pea creek".
