= Northwest Georgia Joint Development Authority =

US development authority

The Northwest Georgia Joint Development Authority (NWGAJDA) is a joint development authority that serves Catoosa County, Chattooga County, Dade County, and Walker County in the U.S. state of Georgia.

The NWGAJDA was created under general statute of the OCGA § 36-62-1 in the year 1998 and is registered with the Georgia Department of Community Affairs. The office of the NWGAJDA is located in Rock Spring, Georgia on U.S. Route 27.

== Joint development authorities in the state of Georgia ==
Joint development authorities (JDAs) are a collaborative effort of two or more jurisdictions to guide the development of a region. The importance of JDAs in Georgia has increased since the passage of the Business Expansion and Support Act (BEST) of 1994. The BEST program allows for an additional $500 credit through the state of Georgia's Job Tax Credit program. In the state of Georgia, two or more jurisdictions may combine to form a joint development authority. In addition, the 2003 House Bill 309 of the Georgia General Assembly allows or the "creation and activation of a joint development authority for a county of this state and a contiguous county of an adjoining state" insofar as to allow for the join collaboration of recreational projects such as sports facilities and amphitheaters

== About the authority ==
=== Mission ===
The mission of the Northwest Georgia Joint Development Authority is to improve the quality of life and increase community wealth for the Catoosa, Chattooga, Dade and Walker County region by promoting the expansion and growth of industry and diversification of the regional economy. The NWGAJDA serves as a marketing arm of economic development for its service region. In addition, the NWGAJDA is involved with new business recruitment, meets with existing industries to discuss expansion or retention needs, helps promote and foster small business and entrepreneurship in the region, and provides area demographics and statistics for companies seeking information.

=== Board of directors ===
The board of directors for the Northwest Georgia Joint Development Authority consists of three citizens from each of the four counties represented. The Commissioner(s) from each county appoints the board members.

=== Staff ===
The staff for the Northwest Georgia Joint Development Authority consists of an executive director, a project manager, and an administrative assistant. The executive director is hired by the board of directors who, in turn, is responsible for hiring the staff for the NWGAJDA. The staff members are as follows:

- Jeff Mullis, executive director
- Keith Barclift, project manager

=== Funding ===
Northwest Georgia Joint Development Authority is currently funded by the counties it represents at a rate of $1.50 per citizen.
