= Town Line, New York =

- Census-designated place
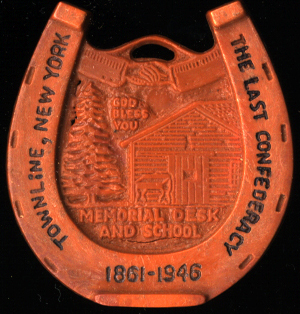

- Location in Erie County and the state of New York
- Coordinates: 42°53′6″N 78°33′30″W
- Country: United States
- State: New York
- County: Erie
- Towns: Alden, Lancaster

Area
  - Total: 4.63 sq mi (11.98 km^{2})
  - Land: 4.62 sq mi (11.97 km^{2})
  - Water: 0.0039 sq mi (0.01 km^{2})
- Elevation: 751 ft (229 m)

Population (2020)
  - Total: 2,334
  - Density: 505.0/sq mi (194.99/km^{2})
- Time zone: UTC-5 (Eastern (EST))
  - Summer (DST): UTC-4 (EDT)
- ZIP Codes: 14004 (Alden); 14086 (Lancaster)
- Area code: 716
- FIPS code: 36-75121
- GNIS feature ID: 0967704

Town Line is a hamlet and census-designated place (CDP) in Erie County, New York, United States. As of the 2020 census, Town Line had a population of 2,334. It is part of the Buffalo-Niagara Falls metropolitan area. The community is located on the boundary between the towns of Lancaster and Alden. Town Line is notable for having held a nonbinding vote to secede from the United States in 1861, and for having held a ceremonial vote to rejoin the United States in 1946.

== History ==
According to Town Line oral lore, in 1861, 125 men gathered in an informal meeting at a local schoolhouse and passed (85 to 40) a resolution to secede from the United States. Because Town Line was never an incorporated municipal entity in the first place and had no well-defined boundaries, the resolution had no legal effect; neither the Confederacy nor the Union ever formally recognized the action. Alden Historical Society archivist Karen Muchow has stated that there are no written records of the action. According to Muchow, several members of the German-American community fled to Canada and twenty residents fought for the Union Army. While the reason behind the vote is unknown, author Daren Wang and others have opined that Town Line residents—some of whom had emigrated from Germany to avoid conscription—were motivated by opposition to a potential military draft being necessitated by the Civil War.

Town Line held a ceremony on January 24, 1946 to "rejoin" the Union. Hollywood celebrity Cesar Romero participated in the festivities. On that day, residents voted, 90 to 23, to rescind the 19th-century secession vote.

== Geography ==
Town Line is located at 42°53′6″N 78°33′30″W (42.884974, -78.558428). According to the United States Census Bureau, the CDP has a total area of 4.6 square miles (12 km^{2}), all land.

== Demographics ==
As of the census of 2000, there were 2,521 people, 906 households, and 759 families residing in the CDP. The population density was 543.5 inhabitants per square mile (209.8/km^{2}). There were 925 housing units at an average density of 199.4 per square mile (77.0/km^{2}). The racial makeup of the CDP was 99.29% White, 0.20% Native American, 0.16% Asian, 0.04% Pacific Islander, and 0.32% from two or more races. Hispanic or Latino of any race were 0.44% of the population.

There were 906 households out of which 32.0% had children under the age of 18 living with them, 74.4% were married couples living together, 6.5% had a female householder with no husband present, and 16.2% were non-families. 13.2% of all households were made up of individuals and 7.1% had someone living alone who was 65 years of age or older. The average household size was 2.78 and the average family size was 3.05.

In the CDP, the population was spread out with 23.9% under the age of 18, 6.1% from 18 to 24, 25.4% from 25 to 44, 31.1% from 45 to 64, and 13.5% who were 65 years of age or older. The median age was 42 years. For every 100 females, there were 101.2 males. For every 100 females age 18 and over, there were 99.4 males.

The median income for a household in the CDP was $51,548, and the median income for a family was $57,054. Males had a median income of $36,589 versus $30,000 for females. The per capita income for the CDP was $21,957. About 3.6% of families and 3.8% of the population were below the poverty line, including 5.9% of those under age 18 and 2.7% of those age 65 or over.

== See also ==
- Dade County, Georgia - voted to secede (unrecognized) from the state of Georgia, and from the United States, rejoined in 1945.
