= Flint Hill, Georgia =

Unincorporated community in Georgia, U.S.

Coordinates: 32°49′21″N 84°38′41″W

Flint Hill is an unincorporated community in Talbot County, in the U.S. state of Georgia.

== History ==
The community's name is a reference to the Flint River.
