= Chattooga County, Georgia =

County in Georgia, United States

- County
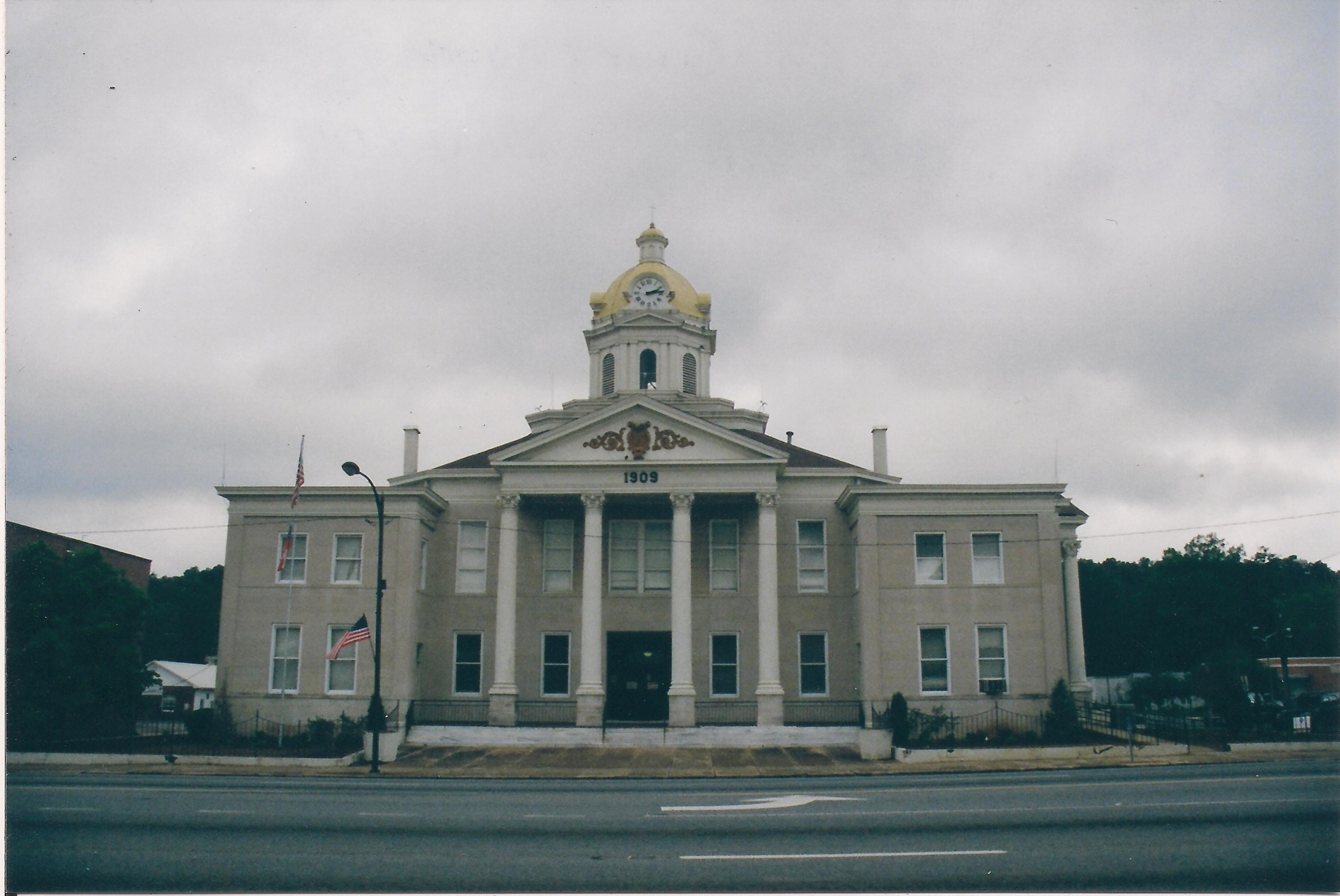
- Chattooga County Courthouse

- Seal Logo

- Location within the U.S. state of Georgia
- Coordinates: 34°29′N 85°21′W
- Country: United States
- State: Georgia
- Founded: 1838; 188 years ago
- Named for: Chattooga River (Alabama-Georgia)
- Seat: Summerville
- Largest city: Summerville

Area
  - Total: 314 sq mi (810 km^{2})
  - Land: 313 sq mi (810 km^{2})
  - Water: 0.2 sq mi (0.52 km^{2}) 0.07%

Population (2020)
  - Total: 24,965
  - Estimate (2025): 25,300 ▲
  - Density: 79.8/sq mi (30.8/km^{2})
- Time zone: UTC−5 (Eastern)
  - Summer (DST): UTC−4 (EDT)
- Congressional district: 14th
- Website: www.chattoogacounty.gov

Chattooga County is a county in the Northwest region of the U.S. state of Georgia. As of the 2020 census, the population was 24,965. The county seat is Summerville. The county was created on December 28, 1838. Chattooga County comprises the Summerville, GA Micropolitan Statistical Area, which is included in the Rome-Summerville Combined Statistical Area. Summerville is the site of the Chattooga County Courthouse. The county is home to several properties listed on the National Register of Historic Places.

== History ==
Chattooga County is named for the Chattooga River, which flows through it. It was originally settled by the "mound builder" culture. A few small mounds can be found throughout the Alpine and Menlo areas. Sometime in the pre-European settlement era, the county was settled by at first the Creek Native Americans and later the Cherokee Native Americans. The principal Cherokee towns in Chattooga were Rivertown (Trion) and Broomtown in Shinbone valley. With the onset of European settlers and after gold was discovered in northern Georgia, the federal government forcibly removed the Cherokees to Oklahoma from Chattooga County in the early 1830s in what has become known as "the Trail of Tears." In this removal, thousands of Native Americans died from sickness, hunger and abuse. The land was then divided amongst white settlers in the Cherokee Land Lottery of 1832. The Lottery transformed Chattooga into a thriving agricultural area in the antebellum South with farms of varying size dotting the fertile landscape of the Chattooga Valley.

The coming of the American Civil War saw Chattoogans polarized into pro and anti-union camps. Confederate armies received five regiments from Chattooga. Several engagements were fought in the county prior to the battle of Chickamauga. General Nathan Bedford Forrest fought an engagement near Alpine with Federal cavalry resulting in the Federals being thrown back to the Chattanooga area. The largest single engagement in Chattooga was the "Battle of Trion Factory," fought on September 15, 1863, on present day First Street near the site of the East Trion Church of God. Confederate Infantry forces under the command of General Benjamin Hardin Helm and cavalry under the command of Gen. Joseph Wheeler defeated Union forces in a running battle that started somewhere near Summerville and ended in Trion. The front section of the Old Trion Cemetery on First Street contains the remains of fifty-five Union soldiers and seven Confederates killed in this action, but the graves are unmarked.

The 1860 county census shows population of 7,165, 28.7 percent of whom were enslaved.

In September 2009, the Chattooga County Camp 507, Sons of Confederate Veterans in conjunction with the Missionary Ridge Camp 63 Sons of Union Veterans, and several local groups erected a memorial monument to remember the "First Battle of Trion Factory" and the soldiers who are buried in unmarked graves at Trion.

In an interesting side note, Confederate General Helm was a brother-in-law to Mary Lincoln and was killed five days after the Battle of Trion Factory on Sept. 20 at the Battle of Chickamauga in Walker County, GA

=== The coming of Sherman ===
After the fall of Atlanta, Confederate General John Bell Hood led his Army of Tennessee from the Atlanta battleground to the north and west, in an attempt to lead General William Tecumseh Sherman's Army of the Cumberland away from Atlanta and out of Georgia. Sherman left a detachment in Atlanta while he took the remainder of his army in pursuit of Hood and the Confederates. Hood's army passed through Chattooga County in September 1864 en route to Gaylesville, Alabama.

General Sherman reportedly stated, upon first seeing the Chattooga Valley from atop Taylors Ridge, that it "is a good fertile valley suitable for agriculture." Upon reaching Summerville, Sherman was informed of a Confederate training camp several miles up the river from town. He proceeded north about two miles and "fired a few shots at the retreating rear guard" of the Confederate force. Reportedly, every road leading out of Chattooga to the west was filled with retreating Confederate soldiers. Sherman telegraphed General Henry Halleck and President Abraham Lincoln from Summerville, to outline his plan for the "March to the Sea," making Chattooga County the birthplace of his march.

== Government ==
Chattooga County is a Republican stronghold in Northwest Georgia. The NW GA region has followed the state, particularly the suburbs of Atlanta, in a dramatic political shift to the right. While most counties in Northwest Georgia vote heavily Republican on the local, state, and national levels, Chattooga is still a Democratic County. The county elected a Republican commissioner in 2016. The county has supported Republicans for national office, but by much closer margins than most areas of the region.

The county is in Georgia's 11th state house district. Former Georgia State Patrolman Eddie Lumsden (R-Armuchee) represents the district, which includes all of Chattooga and parts of Floyd County, in the State House of Representatives . The county is represented by Chickamauga Republican Jeff Mullis in the State Senate.

Chattooga County is served by a vast array of public offices. The county is one of the few in the State of Georgia that still operates under one county commissioner. Blake Elsberry, a local businessman, defeated incumbent Commissioner Jason Winters in the Primary election in 2020. Elsberry's office is on Commerce Street in downtown Summerville, the county's seat.

Sheriff Ralph Kellett served the community as sheriff for almost two decades before losing the Democratic Primary election to John Everett in 2008. Kellett died in 2011. Sheriff Everett kept the seat in Democratic hands in the general election. In 2012, Everett faced a federal lawsuit regarding questionable practices as sheriff, and ended up losing in the 2012 primary, the only incumbent to do so. Democrat Mark Schrader won the 2012 general election. Schrader's office is located at 533 Underwood Drive, about 4 miles north of the county courthouse.

Other elected officers include Tax Commissioner Joy Cooper Hampton, Kim Windle James, the first woman to serve as Clerk of Superior and State Courts, Earle Rainwater as Coroner, and Jon Payne as Probate Judge and Election Superintendent. Buddy Hill serves as Solicitor General and Jon Dennis is the State Court Judge. Judge Kristina Cook-Connelly is judge on the Lookout Mountain Judicial Circuit.

The county's school board, under Chattooga County School Superintendent Jared Hosmer, Leroy Massey Elementary, Menlo School, Lyerly School, Summerville Middle, and Chattooga High School. Chattooga High School is a "Class AA" school according to the Georgia High School Association. The board also oversees one alternative school. Members of the school board include Chair Lori Brady, Vice-chair Tiffany Lawrence, Eddie Elsberry, Bonnie Fletcher, and BJ Montgomery.

The other school system in Chattooga's County is the Trion City School System. The system, constantly named one of the best public schools in the State of Georgia, is served by Superintendent Dr. H. Phillip Williams. Members of the board are Chair Randy Henderson, Vice-chair Kari Maddux, Laura Chesley, Darriel Broome, and Johnny Brimer. The system has one elementary, one middle, and one high school. The school is on one campus and is a "Class A" school according to the Georgia High School Association. According to the Georgia Department of Education, Trion High School was named a Georgia School Of Excellence in 2008, Trion Middle School in 2004, and Trion Elementary School in 2007 and 2012.

== Geography ==
According to the U.S. Census Bureau, the county has a total area of 314 square miles (810 km^{2}), of which 313 square miles (810 km^{2}) is land and 0.2 square miles (0.52 km^{2}) (0.07%) is water.

The eastern third of Chattooga County is located in the Oostanaula River sub-basin of the ACT River Basin (Coosa-Tallapoosa River Basin), while the western two-thirds of the county is located in the Upper Coosa River sub-basin of the same ACT River Basin.

=== Major highways ===
- U.S. Route 27 / State Route 1
- State Route 48
- State Route 100
- State Route 114
- State Route 157
- State Route 337

=== Adjacent counties ===
- Walker County - north
- Floyd County - southeast
- Cherokee County, Alabama - west (CST)
- DeKalb County, Alabama - west (CST)

=== National protected area ===
- Chattahoochee National Forest (part)

== Demographics ==
Historical population
Census	Pop.	Note	%±
1840	3,438		—
1850	6,815		98.2%
1860	7,165		5.1%
1870	6,902		−3.7%
1880	10,021		45.2%
1890	11,202		11.8%
1900	12,952		15.6%
1910	13,608		5.1%
1920	14,312		5.2%
1930	15,407		7.7%
1940	18,532		20.3%
1950	21,197		14.4%
1960	19,954		−5.9%
1970	20,541		2.9%
1980	21,856		6.4%
1990	22,242		1.8%
2000	25,470		14.5%
2010	26,015		2.1%
2020	24,965		−4.0%
2025 (est.)	25,300	▲	1.3%
U.S. Decennial Census; 1790-1880 1890-1910; 1920-1930 1930-1940; 1940-1950 1960-1980; 1980-2000 2010 2020

=== Racial and ethnic composition ===
Chattooga County, Georgia – Racial and ethnic composition Note: the US Census treats Hispanic/Latino as an ethnic category. This table excludes Latinos from the racial categories and assigns them to a separate category. Hispanics/Latinos may be of any race.
Race / Ethnicity (NH = Non-Hispanic)	Pop 1980	Pop 1990	Pop 2000	Pop 2010	Pop 2020	% 1980	% 1990	% 2000	% 2010	% 2020
White alone (NH)	19,783	20,180	21,776	21,589	20,079	90.52%	90.73%	85.50%	82.99%	80.43%
Black or African American alone (NH)	1,867	1,929	2,840	2,886	2,391	8.54%	8.67%	11.15%	11.09%	9.58%
Native American or Alaska Native alone (NH)	15	39	19	48	45	0.07%	0.18%	0.07%	0.18%	0.18%
Asian alone (NH)	17	19	25	108	102	0.08%	0.09%	0.10%	0.42%	0.41%
Native Hawaiian or Pacific Islander alone (NH)	x	x	4	2	0	x	x	0.02%	0.01%	0.00%
Other race alone (NH)	10	0	35	24	81	0.05%	0.00%	0.14%	0.09%	0.32%
Mixed race or Multiracial (NH)	x	x	234	315	970	x	x	0.92%	1.21%	3.89%
Hispanic or Latino (any race)	164	75	537	1,043	1,297	0.75%	0.34%	2.11%	4.01%	5.20%
Total	21,856	22,242	25,470	26,015	24,965	100.00%	100.00%	100.00%	100.00%	100.00%

=== 2020 census ===
As of the 2020 census, the county had a population of 24,965, with 9,520 households and 5,853 families residing there. Of the residents, 22.2% were under the age of 18 and 17.9% were 65 years of age or older; the median age was 40.8 years. For every 100 females there were 102.7 males, and for every 100 females age 18 and over there were 101.7 males. 41.0% of residents lived in urban areas and 59.0% lived in rural areas.

The racial makeup of the county was 81.3% White, 9.6% Black or African American, 0.4% American Indian and Alaska Native, 0.4% Asian, 0.0% Native Hawaiian and Pacific Islander, 3.4% from some other race, and 4.8% from two or more races. Hispanic or Latino residents of any race comprised 5.2% of the population.

Among the 9,520 households, 30.5% had children under the age of 18 living with them and 29.1% had a female householder with no spouse or partner present. About 28.3% of all households were made up of individuals and 13.4% had someone living alone who was 65 years of age or older.

There were 10,854 housing units, of which 12.3% were vacant. Among occupied housing units, 68.6% were owner-occupied and 31.4% were renter-occupied. The homeowner vacancy rate was 1.7% and the rental vacancy rate was 5.3%.

=== 2010 census ===
As of the 2010 United States census, there were 26,015 people, 9,548 households, and 6,665 families residing in the county. The population density was 83.0 inhabitants per square mile (32.0/km^{2}). There were 10,977 housing units at an average density of 35.0 units per square mile (13.5 units/km^{2}). The racial makeup of the county was 83.9% white, 11.1% black or African American, 0.4% Asian, 0.3% American Indian, 0.1% Pacific islander, 2.6% from other races, and 1.6% from two or more races. Those of Hispanic or Latino origin made up 4.0% of the population. In terms of ancestry, 41.1% were American, 8.5% were Irish, 6.5% were German, and 5.9% were English.

Of the 9,548 households, 33.6% had children under the age of 18 living with them, 50.4% were married couples living together, 14.0% had a female householder with no husband present, 30.2% were non-families, and 26.6% of all households were made up of individuals. The average household size was 2.52 and the average family size was 3.02. The median age was 39.3 years.

The median income for a household in the county was $32,419 and the median income for a family was $39,037. Males had a median income of $32,099 versus $25,475 for females. The per capita income for the county was $15,158. About 14.6% of families and 19.2% of the population were below the poverty line, including 24.8% of those under age 18 and 16.1% of those age 65 or over.

=== 2000 census ===
As of the census of 2010, there were 26,015 people, 9,548 households, and 6,837 families residing in the county. The population density was 83 people per square mile (32 people/km^{2}). There were 10,977 housing units at an average density of 35 units per square mile (14 units/km^{2}). The racial makeup of the county was 83.91% White, 11.14% Black or African American, 0.08% Native American, 0.42% Asian, 0.02% Pacific Islander, 2.58% from other races, and 1.59% from two or more races. 4.00% of the population were Hispanic or Latino of any race.

There were 9,577 households, out of which 33% had children under the age of 18 living with them, 47% were married couples living together, 5% had a female householder with no husband present, and 31% were non-families. 25.20% of all households were made up of individuals, and 29% had one or more persons living there who was 65 years of age or older. The average household size was 2.6 and the average family size was 2.94.

In the county, the population was spread out, with 22.90% under the age of 18, 10.00% from 18 to 24, 30.00% from 25 to 44, 22.80% from 45 to 64, and 14.30% who were 65 years of age or older. The median age was 36 years. For every 100 females there were 106.60 males. For every 100 females age 18 and over, there were 106.60 males.

The median income for a household in the county was $30,664, and the median income for a family was $36,230. Males had a median income of $26,505 versus $21,014 for females. The per capita income for the county was $14,508. About 11.30% of families and 14.30% of the population were below the poverty line, including 17.40% of those under age 18 and 14.90% of those age 65 or over.

== Recreation ==
- Sloppy Floyd Lake Park
- Chattahoochee–Oconee National Forest
- Chattooga River

== Cities and communities ==
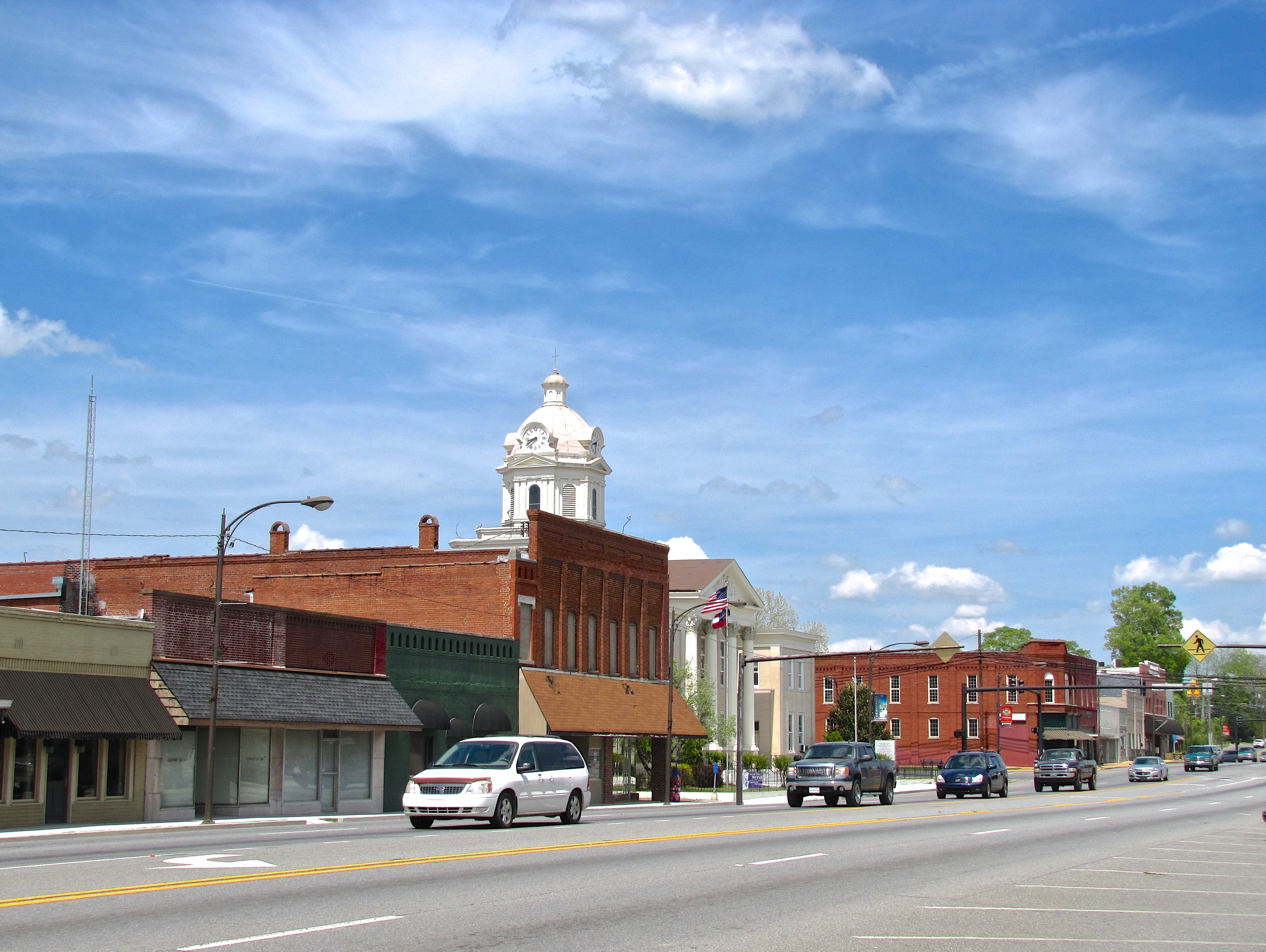
Summerville

=== Incorporated cities ===
- Summerville
- Trion
- Lyerly
- Menlo

=== Unincorporated communities ===
- Alpine
- Armuchee
- Berryton
- Chattoogaville
- Cloudland
- Farmersville
- Subligna
- Gore
- Holland
- Pennville
- Silver Hill
- Teloga

== Politics ==
As of the 2020s, Chattooga County is a strongly Republican voting county, voting 81.91% for Donald Trump in 2024. For elections to the United States House of Representatives, Chattooga County is part of Georgia's 14th congressional district. For elections to the Georgia State Senate, Chattooga County is part of District 53. For elections to the Georgia House of Representatives, Chattooga County is part of District 12.

United States presidential election results for Chattooga County, Georgia
Year	Republican		Democratic		Third party(ies)	
Year	No.	%	No.	%	No.	%
1912	220	25.37%	578	66.67%	69	7.96%
1916	240	18.96%	1,006	79.46%	20	1.58%
1920	514	36.69%	887	63.31%	0	0.00%
1924	412	19.99%	1,615	78.36%	34	1.65%
1928	1,096	54.37%	920	45.63%	0	0.00%
1932	188	7.80%	2,200	91.25%	23	0.95%
1936	231	7.15%	2,999	92.79%	2	0.06%
1940	273	10.12%	2,413	89.47%	11	0.41%
1944	287	10.32%	2,495	89.68%	0	0.00%
1948	362	9.16%	3,396	85.97%	192	4.86%
1952	771	17.57%	3,616	82.43%	0	0.00%
1956	1,682	30.55%	3,823	69.45%	0	0.00%
1960	1,596	30.22%	3,686	69.78%	0	0.00%
1964	1,476	27.01%	3,986	72.94%	3	0.05%
1968	1,087	20.26%	1,255	23.39%	3,024	56.35%
1972	3,188	77.55%	923	22.45%	0	0.00%
1976	1,087	18.83%	4,686	81.17%	0	0.00%
1980	1,946	30.74%	4,279	67.60%	105	1.66%
1984	2,953	53.41%	2,576	46.59%	0	0.00%
1988	3,665	62.17%	2,206	37.42%	24	0.41%
1992	2,439	38.09%	2,976	46.47%	989	15.44%
1996	2,513	39.72%	3,003	47.47%	810	12.80%
2000	3,640	56.20%	2,729	42.13%	108	1.67%
2004	4,992	63.50%	2,809	35.73%	61	0.78%
2008	5,572	66.83%	2,596	31.14%	169	2.03%
2012	5,452	69.28%	2,232	28.36%	185	2.35%
2016	6,462	78.31%	1,613	19.55%	177	2.14%
2020	8,064	80.21%	1,854	18.44%	135	1.34%
2024	8,769	81.91%	1,896	17.71%	41	0.38%

United States Senate election results for Chattooga County, Georgia2
Year	Republican		Democratic		Third party(ies)	
Year	No.	%	No.	%	No.	%
2020	7,777	78.26%	1,886	18.98%	275	2.77%
2020	6,558	79.67%	1,673	20.33%	0	0.00%

United States Senate election results for Chattooga County, Georgia3
Year	Republican		Democratic		Third party(ies)	
Year	No.	%	No.	%	No.	%
2020	3,858	39.76%	1,129	11.64%	4,716	48.60%
2020	6,550	79.53%	1,686	20.47%	0	0.00%
2022	5,977	78.00%	1,514	19.76%	172	2.24%
2022	5,500	80.37%	1,343	19.63%	0	0.00%

Georgia Gubernatorial election results for Chattooga County
Year	Republican		Democratic		Third party(ies)	
Year	No.	%	No.	%	No.	%
2022	6,471	83.91%	1,192	15.46%	49	0.64%

== Notable people ==
- Howard Finster, Christian folk artist
- Rick Camp, former baseball pitcher for the Atlanta Braves
- Bobby Lee Cook, notable defense attorney
- Edna Cain Daniel, journalist and publisher
- Barbara Massey Reece, former member of the Georgia House of Representatives
- Senorise Perry, NFL football player
- Brody Malone, U.S. Olympic Gymnast

== See also ==
- National Register of Historic Places listings in Chattooga County, Georgia
- Northwest Georgia Joint Development Authority
- List of counties in Georgia
