= Eastville, Georgia =

Unincorporated community in Georgia, U.S.

Coordinates: 33°52′39″N 83°30′18″W

Eastville is an unincorporated community in Oconee County, in the U.S. state of Georgia.

== History ==
A post office called Eastville was in operation from 1891 until 1893. The Georgia General Assembly incorporated the place in 1906 as the "Town of Eastville". The community was named after Mr. Silas East. The town's municipal charter was dissolved in 1995.
