= National Register of Historic Places listings in Dade County, Georgia =

This is a list of properties and districts in Dade County, Georgia that are listed on the National Register of Historic Places (NRHP).

This National Park Service list is complete through NPS recent listings posted May 15, 2026.

== Current listings ==
	Name on the Register	Image	Date listed	Location	City or town	Description
1	Dade County Courthouse	Dade County Courthouse	September 18, 1980 (#80001009)	Courthouse Sq. 34°52′20″N 85°30′33″W	Trenton	
2	Lookout Mountain Hotel	Lookout Mountain Hotel	February 27, 2019 (#100003423)	14049 Scenic Hwy. 34°57′56″N 85°22′30″W	Lookout Mountain	Built in 1928 as a resort hotel, now Carter Hall on the Covenant College campus.
