= Cloudland, Georgia =

Cloudland
- Unincorporated community
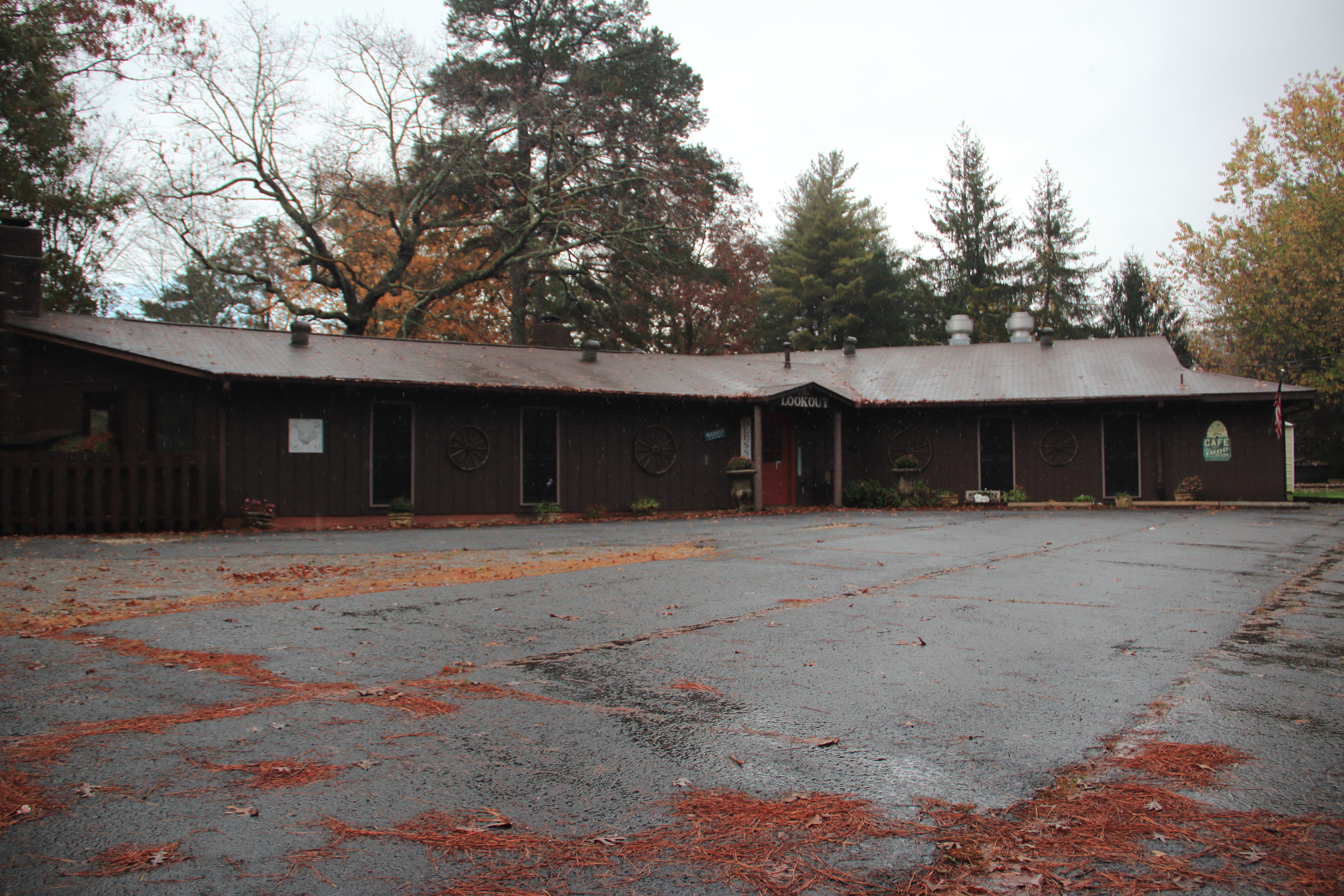
- The Lookout Restaurant in Cloudland

- Location in Georgia Location in the United States
- Coordinates: 34°30′57″N 85°29′40″W
- Country: United States
- State: Georgia
- County: Chattooga

Cloudland is an unincorporated community in western Chattooga County in the U.S. state of Georgia. It is located at an elevation of 1,498 feet atop Lookout Mountain, a broad ridge that occupies northwestern Georgia and northeastern Alabama. Camp Juliette Low, named for founder Juliette Gordon Low, is located just northeast of town.

== History ==
Cloudland had its start in the late 19th century as a summer resort. The community was named after businessman A.C. Cloud. A post office was in operation at Cloudland from 1916 until 1981.
