= List of plantations in Georgia (U.S. state) =

This is a list of plantations and/or plantation houses in the U.S. state of Georgia that are National Historic Landmarks, listed on the National Register of Historic Places, listed on a heritage register, or are otherwise significant for their history, association with significant events or people, or their architecture and design.

Color key	Historic register listing
	National Historic Landmark
	National Register of Historic Places
	Contributing property to a National Register of Historic Places historic district
	Not listed on national or state register

NRHP reference number	Name	Image	Date designated	Locality	County	Notes
72000402	Arnold-Callaway Plantation			Washington	Wilkes	
	Barnes Plantation			Woodbury	Meriwether	c. 1830, now known as "Harmony Hall"
	Barnsley Gardens			Adairsville	Bartow	
71000280	Birdsville Plantation			Millen	Jenkins	
	Bonaventure Plantation			Savannah	Chatham	Used as an escape route during the Revolutionary War
89002015	Box Hall Plantation			Thomasville	Thomas	
	Cannon Point			St. Simons Island	Glynn	
75000615	Casulon Plantation			Good Hope	Walton	
84001156	Champion-McGarrah Plantation			Friendship	Sumter	
79000713	Andrew J. Cheney House		July 22, 1979	Marietta	Cobb	
82002491	John Chapman Plantation			Jeffersonville	Twiggs	
74000703	Colonsay Plantation			Crawfordville	Taliaferro	
80001039	William D. Cowdry Plantation			Cave Spring	Floyd	
90000805	Robert Craig Plantation			Lawrenceville	Gwinnett	
73000620	Curry Hill Plantation			Bainbridge	Decatur	
79000731	Davis-Felton Plantation			Henderson	Houston	
95000741	Dickey-Birdsong Plantation			Beachton	Grady	
97000559	Early Hill Plantation			Greensboro	Greene	
74000662	Eudora Plantation			Quitman	Brooks	
75000616	Francis Plantation			Davisboro	Washington	
75000606	Gatewood House		June 20, 1975	Eatonton	Putnam	
74000687	Glen Mary Plantation		May 8, 1974	Sparta	Hancock	
80001019	Mitchell J. Green Plantation			Claxton	Evans	
	Greenwich Plantation			Savannah	Chatham	Location of notable Roman statuary imports. The house and grounds were used in several silent films, including Stolen Moments.
76000650	Greenwood Plantation			Thomasville	Thomas	
88000968	Hamilton Plantation slave cabins			St. Simons Island	Glynn	Unusually well-built slave cabins; summer tours given by Cassina Garden Club
76000635	Hofwyl-Broadfield Plantation			Brunswick	Glynn	
90001408	Holder Plantation			Jefferson	Jackson	
03001138	Hollywood Plantation			Thomasville	Thomas	
96000874	Hurt-Rives Plantation			Sparta	Hancock	
84001116	John S. Jackson Plantation House and Outbuildings			White Plains	Greene	
73000624	Jarrell Plantation			East Juliette	Jones	
84001163	Jones-Florence Plantation			Odessadale	Meriwether	
79000704	Lebanon Plantation		November 29, 1974	Savannah	Chatham	House built in 1804
80001236	Liberty Hall		November 25, 1980	Americus	Sumter	House built in c. 1861
70000216	Liberty Hall	Alexander Stephens Memorial and Liberty Hall	May 4, 1983	Crawfordville; 33.55601°N 82.89589°W	Taliaferro	
94001215	Liberty Hill		February 24, 1975	LaGrange	Troup	House built in 1836
94001215	Lockhart-Cosby Plantation			Talbot	Talbot	
86003456	John Frank Mathews Plantation			Prattsburg	Talbot	
89002275	Melrose and Sinkola Plantations			Thomasville	Thomas	
97000300	Mill Creek Plantation			Thomasville	Thomas	
76000651	Millpond Plantation			Thomasville	Thomas	
01000535	Oak Grove Plantation			Newnan	Coweta	
93000236	Pearson-Boyer Plantation			Sparta	Hancock	
90000146	Pebble Hill Plantation			Thomasville	Thomas	
90000105	Pine Bloom Plantation			Newton	Baker	
85001977	Peter W. Printup Plantation			Union Point	Greene	
85000939	Nathaniel Prothro Plantation			Richland	Stewart	
	Rebecca Walker Plantation			Hephzibah	Richmond	
78000966	Richmond Hill Plantation			Richmond Hill	Bryan	
	Richmond Oak Grove Plantation				Chatham	Former plantation of Anthony Wayne
	Rural Home			Jonesboro	Clayton	Plantation house that Margaret Mitchell based Tara off of in Gone With the Wind.
75000575	Mulberry Grove Plantation		July 17, 1975	Port Wentworth	Chatham	Former plantation of Nathanael Greene. Location where Eli Whitney conceived the cotton gin
80000979	Sapp Plantation			Sardis	Burke County	
	Wade Plantation				Screven	
	Grove Point Plantation				Chatham	
80004451	Wilkes Knob Plantation			Marshallville	Macon	
80001061	William S. Simmons Plantation			Cave Spring	Floyd	
84000265	Stafford Plantation			St. Marys	Camden	The only antebellum-era structures are "the chimneys," slave cabin ruins.
70000205	Susina Plantation			Beachton	Grady	
89002037	Tarver Plantation			Newton	Baker	
04001188	Teel-Crawford-Gaston Plantation			Americus	Sumter	
04001212	Thornton Plantation			Pine Mountain	Harris	
82002493	Wimberly Plantation			Jeffersonville	Twiggs	
	Woodville Plantation			Winfield	Columbia	
73000615	Wormsloe Plantation			Savannah	Chatham	

== See also ==
- History of slavery in Georgia (U.S. state)
- List of plantations in the United States
