= National Register of Historic Places listings in Baker County, Georgia =

This is a list of properties and districts in Baker County, Georgia that are listed on the National Register of Historic Places (NRHP).

This National Park Service list is complete through NPS recent listings posted March 21, 2025.

== Current listings ==
	Name on the Register	Image	Date listed	Location	City or town	Description
1	Baker County Courthouse	Baker County Courthouse	September 18, 1980 (#80004443)	Courthouse Sq. 31°18′51″N 84°20′07″W	Newton	
2	Notchaway Baptist Church and Cemetery	Notchaway Baptist Church and Cemetery	May 25, 2001 (#01000534)	Jct. of GA 91 and GA 253; 31°11′28″N 84°31′03″W	Newton	
3	Pine Bloom Plantation		February 9, 1990 (#90000105)	Tarva Rd./Co. Rt. 122, 0.75 mi. S of Baker/Dougherty county line 31°24′17″N 84°19′46″W	Newton	
4	Tarver Plantation		November 27, 1989 (#89002037)	Tarva Rd./Co. Rt. 122, N of Newton; 31°25′29″N 84°20′48″W	Newton	Possibly at 31.43513°N 84.338°W
