= List of cemeteries in Georgia (U.S. state) =

Cemeteries in Georgia include currently operating, historical (closed for new interments), and defunct (graves abandoned or removed) cemeteries, columbaria, and mausolea which are historical and/or notable. The list below does not include pet cemeteries.

== Cemeteries in Georgia ==
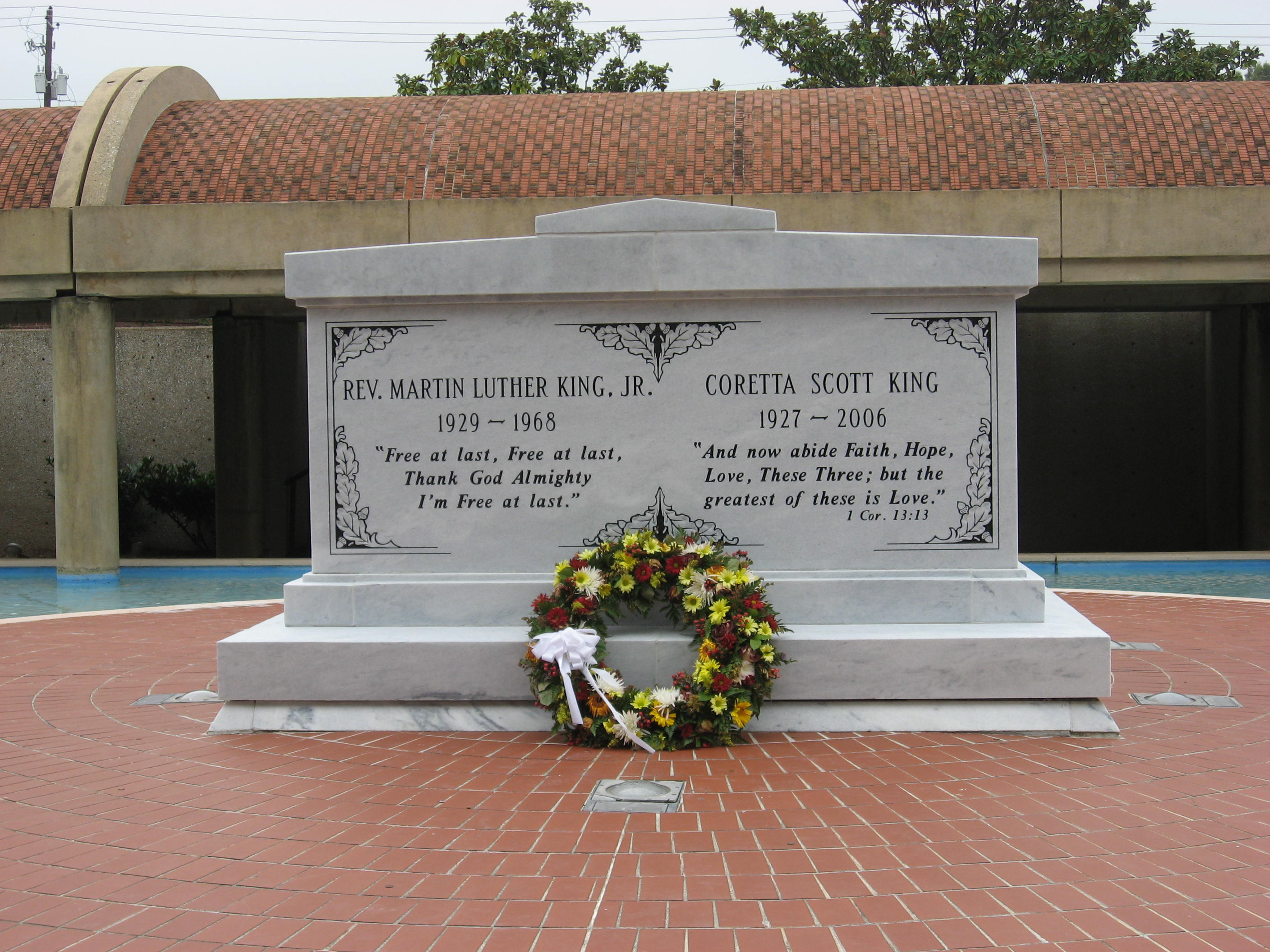
Martin Luther King Jr. and Coretta Scott King Tomb in the Sweet Auburn district, preserved at the Martin Luther King Jr. National Historic Site

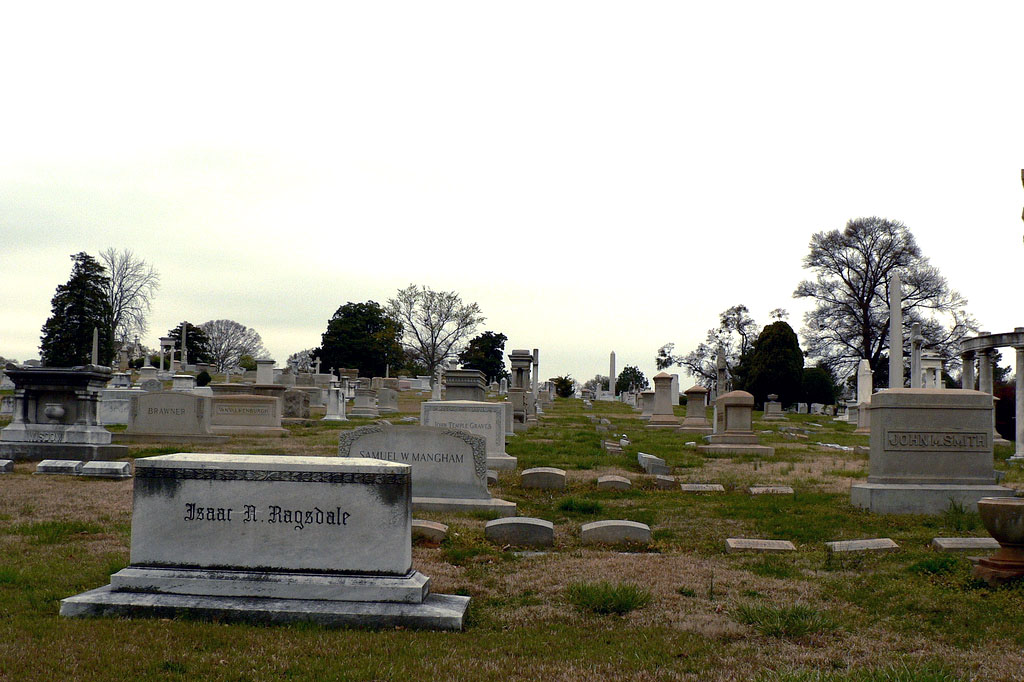
Westview Cemetery in Atlanta

- Black Pioneers Cemetery, Euharlee
- Ebenezer Cemetery, Jerusalem Lutheran Church, Rincon; founded 1733 by Lutheran refugees from Salzburg
- Forest Lawn Cemetery, College Park
- Georgia National Cemetery, near Canton
- Greenwood Cemetery, Atlanta
- Laurel Grove Cemetery
- Levi Sheftall Family Cemetery, Savannah
- Lincoln Cemetery, Atlanta
- Linwood Cemetery, Columbus
- Macon Memorial Park, Macon
- Magnolia Cemetery, Augusta
- Marietta Confederate Cemetery
- Martin Luther King Jr. Center for Nonviolent Social Change, Atlanta
- Memory Hill Cemetery
- Mordecai Sheftall Cemetery, Savannah
- Oak Hill Cemetery, Cartersville
- Parkhill Cemetery, Columbus
- Patrick R. Cleburne Confederate Cemetery; Civil War memorial cemetery with hundreds of unmarked Confederate graves
- Resaca Confederate Cemetery, Resaca
- South Bend Cemetery
- South-View Cemetery, Atlanta
- Southview Cemetery, Augusta
- Summerville Cemetery, Augusta
- Sunbury Cemetery, Sunbury
- St. James Episcopal Cemetery, Marietta
- Walker Memorial Park, Augusta
- Westview Cemetery, Atlanta; largest civilian cemetery in southeastern United States

=== Cemeteries on the National Register of Historic Places in Georgia ===
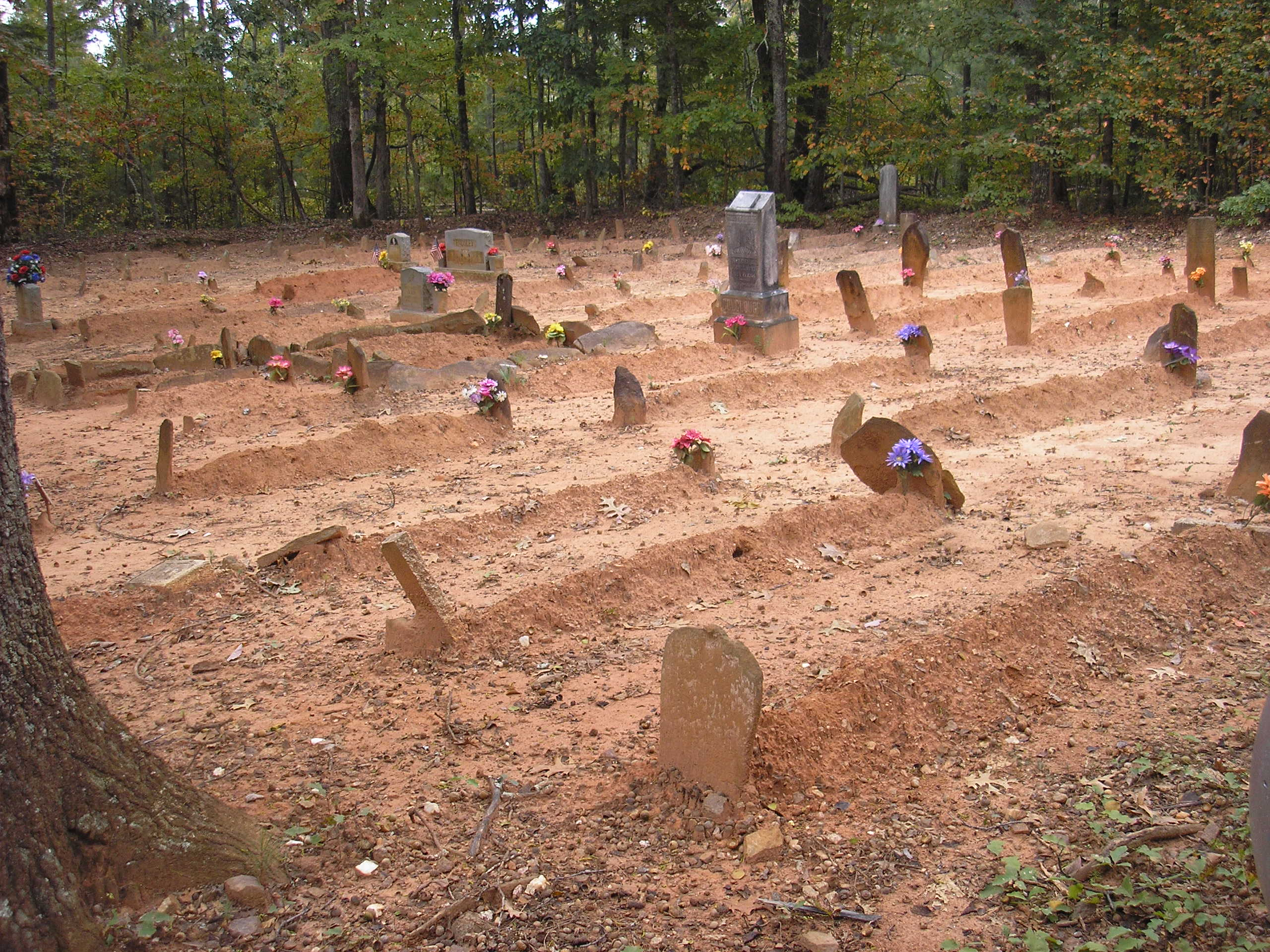
Basket Creek Cemetery in Douglas County

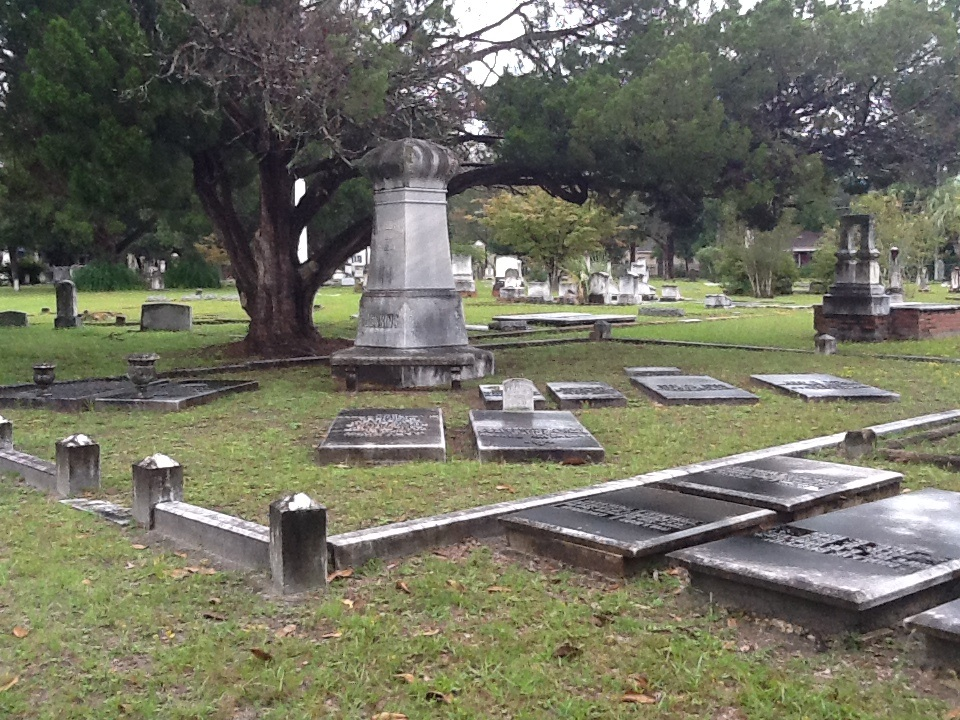
Lott Cemetery in Waycross

- Andersonville National Historic Site, Andersonville
- Basket Creek Cemetery, Douglas County
- Behavior Cemetery, Hog Hammock
- Bonaventure Cemetery, Savannah; made famous by the Bird Girl sculpture featured on the cover of the book, Midnight in the Garden of Good and Evil (1994)
- City Cemetery, Sandersville,
- Crawford-Dorsey House and Cemetery, Lovejoy
- Colored Cemetery, Columbus
- Decatur Cemetery, Decatur
- Jackson Street Cemetery, Athens
- Lott Cemetery, Waycross
- Marietta National Cemetery, Marietta
- McCanaan Missionary Baptist Church and Cemetery, Sardis
- Midway Historic District, Midway
- Myrtle Hill Cemetery, Rome
- Notchaway Baptist Church and Cemetery, Newton
- Oakland Cemetery, Atlanta
- Oak Grove Cemetery, Americus; contributing property
- Oconee Hill Cemetery, Athens
- Old City Cemetery, Columbus
- Riverside Cemetery, Macon
- Robert Mable House and Cemetery, Mableton
- Rose Hill Cemetery, Macon
- Sunset Hill Cemetery, Valdosta
- Teel–Crawford–Gaston Plantation, Americus
- Upper Lott's Creek Primitive Baptist Church and Cemetery, Metter

== See also ==
- List of cemeteries in the United States
