= Baker County Courthouse =

Baker County Courthouse may refer to:

- Old Baker County Courthouse, Macclenny, Florida, US
- Baker County Courthouse (Georgia), US
