= List of cemeteries in Georgia =

List of cemeteries in Georgia may refer to:

- List of cemeteries in Georgia (country)
- List of cemeteries in Georgia (U.S. state)
