= Ward Allen =

American naturalist, duck hunter and merchant (1856-1931)

- Pictured around 1920
- Born: Robert Ward Allen; August 8, 1856; Savannah, Georgia, U.S.
- Died: August 23, 1931 (aged 75); Savannah River, Savannah, Georgia, U.S.
- Resting place: Magnolia Cemetery, Augusta, Georgia, U.S.
- Occupations: game hunter, merchant
- Spouse: Lucy T. Stubbs (1895–1931; his death)

Robert Ward Allen (August 8, 1856 – August 23, 1931) was an American naturalist, duck hunter and merchant. He became the central character in John Eugene Cay Jr.'s 1958 non-fiction book Ward Allen: Savannah River Market Hunter. The book was the basis for the 2013 movie Savannah.

== Early life and career ==
Allen was born in 1856 in Savannah, Georgia, the oldest child of Robert E. Allen and Georgia Ward. His father, a lawyer who owned Savannah's Allen's Station plantation, died when Allen was ten years old.

He studied at the University of Oxford, but after returning to the United States, he decided he did not want to follow his father into the legal world; instead, he formed a duck-hunting business in Savannah's marshland with Christmas Moultrie, a former slave born on Mulberry Grove Plantation on December 25, 1857. They sold the ducks to local restaurants, including that of The DeSoto, or Savannahian families.

On October 23, 1895, Allen married Lucy T. Stubbs at Savannah's St. John's Church. Stubbs, the daughter of an affluent Savannahian family, was over twenty years younger than Allen. The newlyweds rented a large house on Oglethorpe Avenue in Savannah's downtown.

The Allens endured a stillborn child, which resulted in Lucy's fall into a deep and long-lasting postpartum depression. In 1920, she was admitted to the Georgia State Sanitarium in Baldwin, Georgia. She remained there until her death in 1934.

In 1927, the Savannah National Wildlife Refuge introduced a law limiting the number of ducks that could be killed on one hunting trip, as well as having a hunting season. These restrictions affected Allen's livelihood; as such, he attempted to bypass them, but was arrested on several occasions. Concerned about the future of Savannah's marshes, due to the increasing number of factories in the city, he regularly wrote articles in the local press. He went to the Georgia State Legislature with his concerns, but had no success in affecting change.

Allen, along with his Chesapeake Bay Retrievers, moved from downtown Savannah to a shack on the banks of the Savannah River and became a recluse. Kenno, his favorite of the two dogs, died shortly thereafter. Allen suffered the loss greatly.

== Death ==
Allen died in 1931, aged 75. His body was found floating in the Savannah River. He was buried in Magnolia Cemetery in Augusta, Georgia, alongside his parents.

Allen's popularity grew with the release of the 2013 film Savannah, which was based on John Eugene Cay Jr.'s 1958 non-fiction book Ward Allen: Savannah River Market Hunter. Jim Caviezel portrayed Allen in the movie adaptation. In 2019, Allen's collection of duck decoys and shotguns were donated to the Georgia Historical Society.

Christmas Moultrie died on April 23, 1956, aged 98. He is interred in Cherokee Hill Baptist Churchyard in Port Wentworth, Georgia. The Moultrie Interchange on Interstate 95 is named for him.
