= Christmas Moultrie =

American duck hunter and merchant

- Pictured in the early 20th century
- Born: December 25, 1857; Mulberry Grove Plantation, Savannah, Georgia, U.S.
- Died: April 23, 1956 (aged 98); Port Wentworth, Georgia, U.S.
- Resting place: Cherokee Hill Baptist Churchyard, Port Wentworth, Georgia, U.S.
- Occupations: game hunter, merchant

Christmas Moultrie (December 25, 1857 – April 23, 1956) was an American former slave who became a duck hunter and merchant. He was a central character in John Eugene Cay Jr.'s 1958 non-fiction book Ward Allen: Savannah River Market Hunter. The book was the basis for the 2013 movie Savannah.

== Early life and career ==
Moultrie was born on Christmas Day 1857 at Mulberry Grove Plantation in Savannah, Georgia, the last child born into slavery on the plantation. His mother died shortly after his birth. His family name came from the Moultrie family in Charleston, South Carolina.

In December 1864, his family moved a few miles away to Monteith, Georgia, after General Sherman's forces burned the plantation during his March to the Sea, but Moultrie remained at the plantation, as a free man, in a "raised cabin by the plantation gate near the Augusta highway."

He formed a business hunting ducks in Savannah's marshland with Ward Allen. They sold the ducks to local restaurants, including that of The DeSoto, or Savannahian families. He also sold vegetables at City Market.

Moultrie had one known child, Hardee, born in 1895; he died in 1935, aged 39 or 40. His granddaughter, Martha F. McCullough (born in 1927), became a teacher in Savannah. He had at least three other granddaughters: Mary F. Johnson, Georgia Benton and Della Stell.

In 1927, the Savannah National Wildlife Refuge introduced a law limiting the number of ducks that could be killed on one hunting trip, as well as having a hunting season. These restrictions affected Moultrie's and Allen's livelihood. Concerned about the future of Savannah's marshes, due to the increasing number of factories in the city, Allen regularly wrote articles in the local press. He went to the Georgia State Legislature with his concerns, but had no success in affecting change.

Allen died on August 23, 1931, aged 75. His body was found floating in the Savannah River.

== Death and legacy ==
Moultrie died on April 23, 1956, in Port Wentworth, Georgia. He was 98. He is interred in Port Wentworth's Cherokee Hill Baptist Churchyard.

Moultrie's popularity grew with the release of the 2013 film Savannah, which was based on John Eugene Cay Jr.'s 1958 non-fiction book Ward Allen: Savannah River Market Hunter. Chiwetel Ejiofor portrayed Moultrie in the movie adaptation.

In 2008, the Moultrie Interchange at Georgia State Route 21 and Interstate 95 was named for him.
