= Baker County School District (Georgia) =

School district in Georgia (U.S. state)

Address
- 260 GA Hwy 37 E, PO Box 40 Newton, Georgia, 39870; United States
- Coordinates: 32.191052°N 83.173971°W

District information
- Grades: Pre-school - 12
- Superintendent: Dr. Roy Brooks
- Accreditations: Southern Association of Colleges and Schools; Georgia Accrediting Commission
- NCES District ID: 1300180

Students and staff
- Enrollment: 284
- Faculty: 34

Other information
- Telephone: (229) 734-5274
- Fax: (229) 734-6123
- Website: www.baker.k12.ga.us

Baker County K-12 School

Location
- 260 Georgia Highway 37 Southwest; Newton, (Baker County), Georgia 39870; United States

Information
- Type: Public high school
- Principal: Jeff Henderson
- Staff: 26.30 (FTE)
- Enrollment: 293 (2023-24)
- Student to teacher ratio: 11.14
- Colors: Black and gold
- Nickname: Bears
- Website: Baker County K-12 School

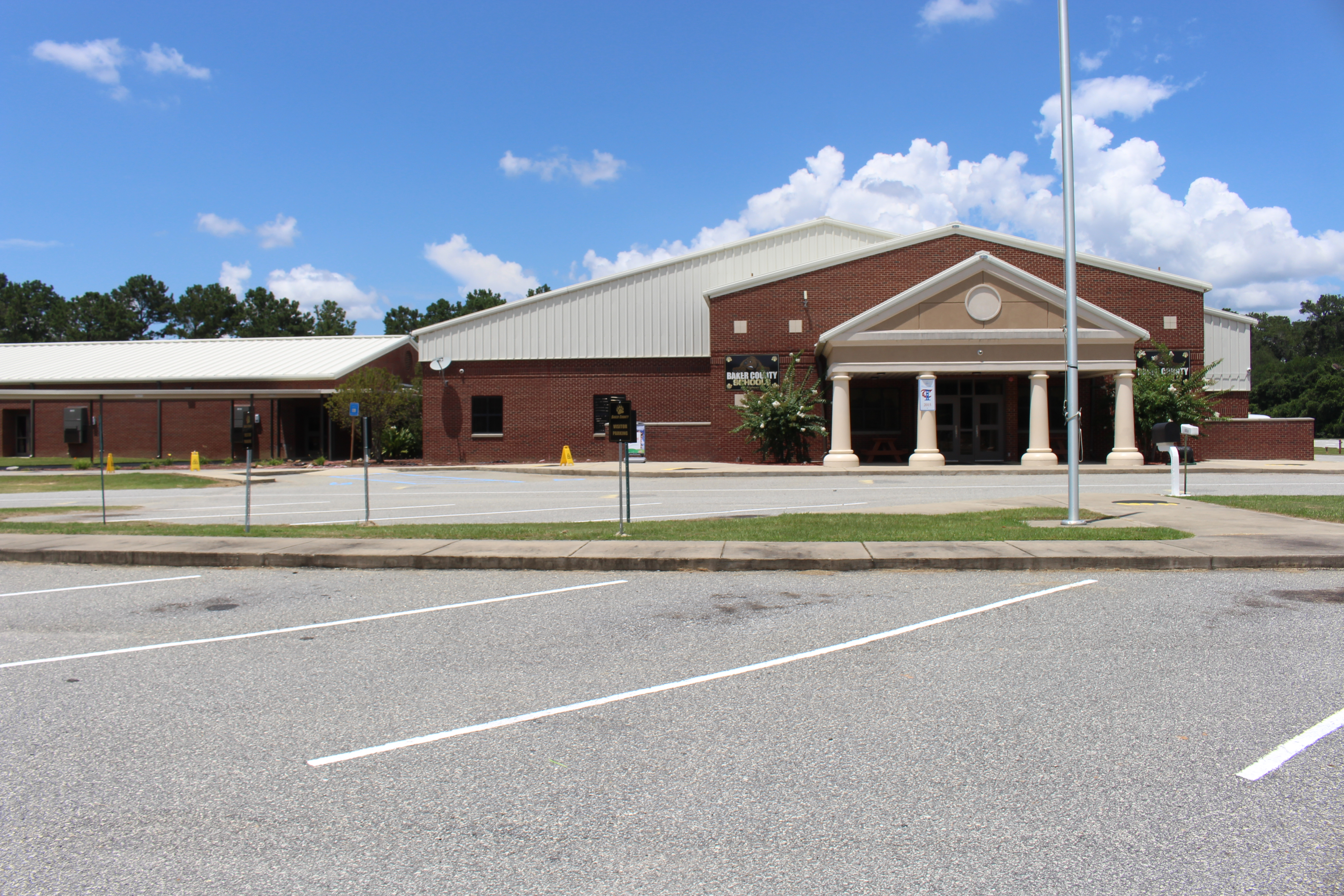
Baker County Schools school building

The Baker County School District, also known as the Baker County School System, is a public school district in Baker County, Georgia, United States, based in Newton. It serves the communities of Elmodel and Newton.

== Schools ==
The district has one school serving pre-school to grade twelve. It is the Baker County School, which includes Baker County High School.

== History ==
Prior to court-ordered integration of the public schools, separate schools were maintained for white and black students. In 1972, the courts found the school board had skirted integration by selling buses and other public resources including West Baker Elementary Schools to private Baker Academy at a loss. Around the late 1980s, students typically attended neighboring Mitchell County schools. In more recent years they have returned to a new school built in Newton: the Baker County K12 School.

== Gallery ==
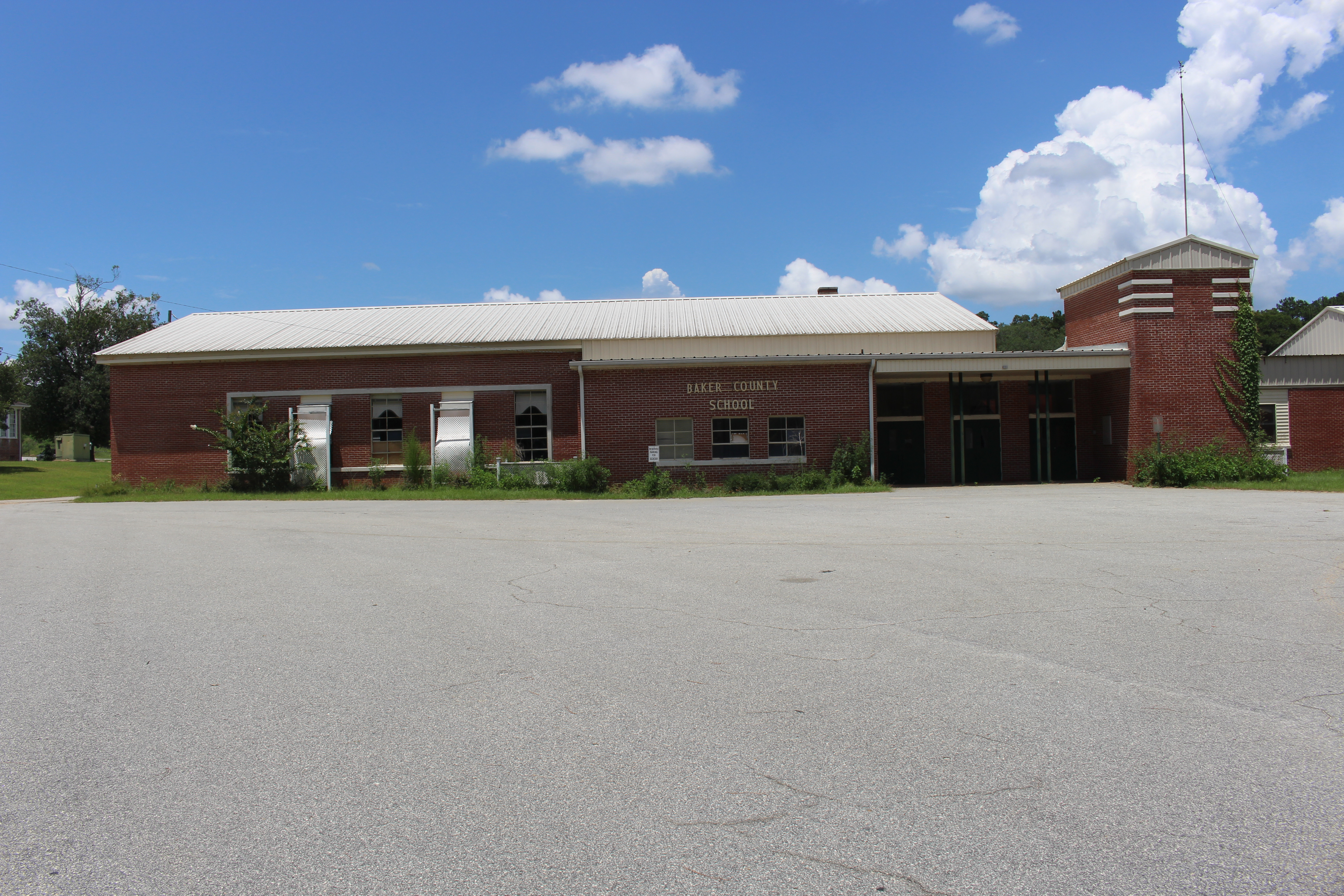
Former Baker County School

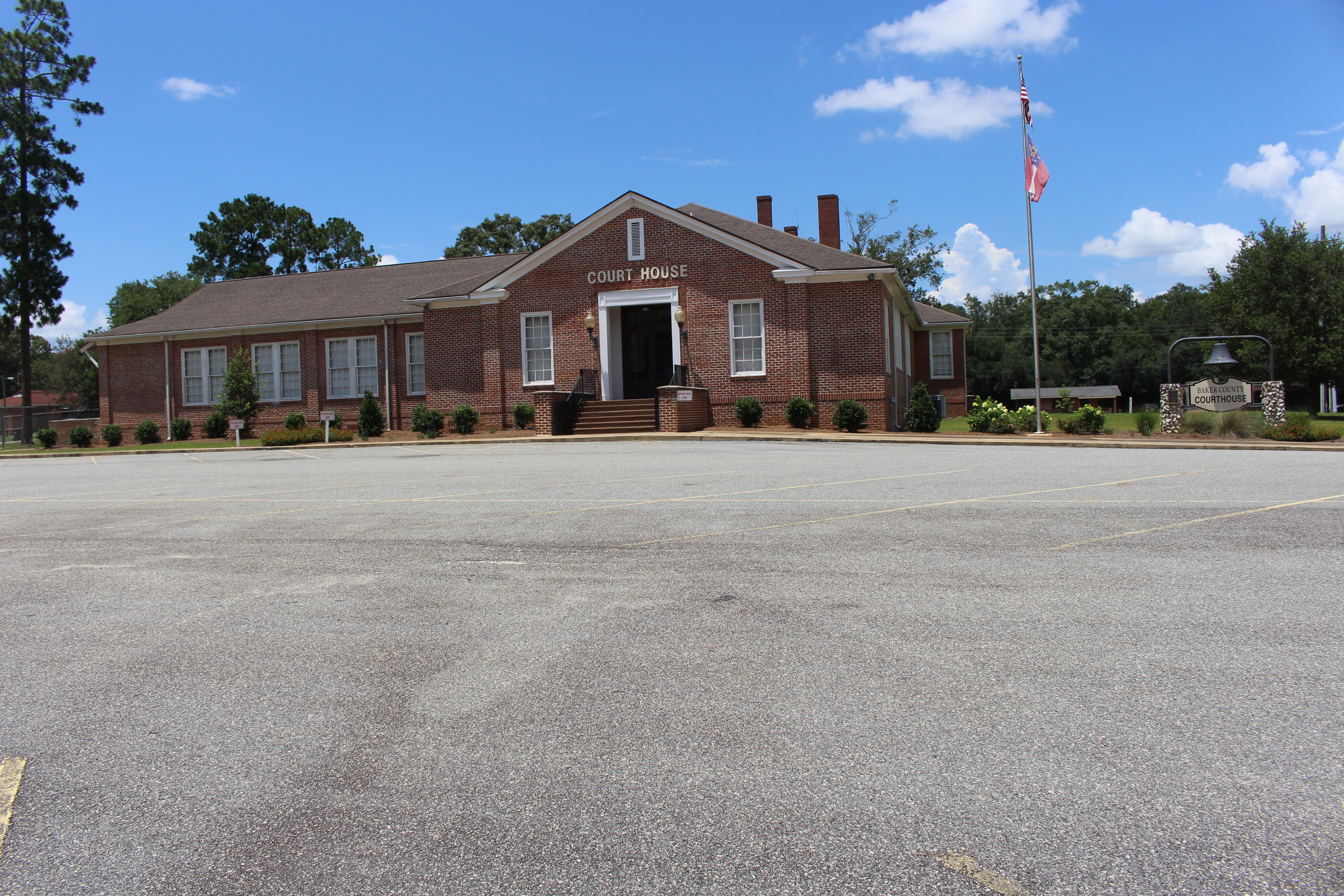
Baker County Courthouse, a former building of the Baker County High School
