= Baker County, Georgia =

County in Georgia, United States

- County
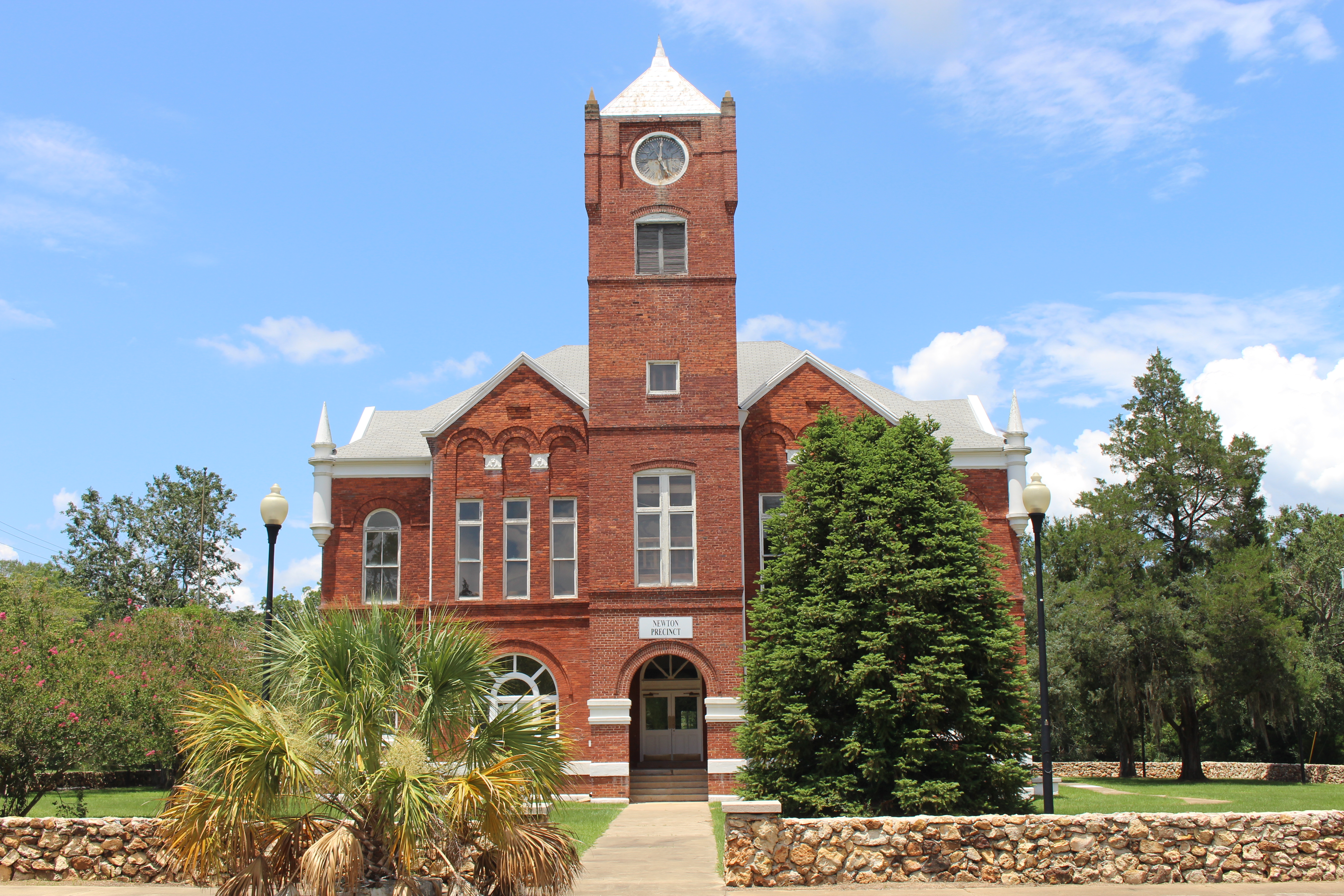
- Baker County Courthouse in Newton.

- Seal

- Location within the U.S. state of Georgia
- Coordinates: 31°20′N 84°27′W
- Country: United States
- State: Georgia
- Founded: December 12, 1825; 200 years ago
- Named for: John Baker
- Seat: Newton
- Largest city: Newton

Area
  - Total: 349 sq mi (900 km^{2})
  - Land: 342 sq mi (890 km^{2})
  - Water: 7.2 sq mi (19 km^{2}) 2.1%

Population (2020)
  - Total: 2,876
  - Estimate (2025): 2,725 ▼
  - Density: 8/sq mi (3.1/km^{2})
- Time zone: UTC−5 (Eastern)
  - Summer (DST): UTC−4 (EDT)
- Congressional district: 2nd
- Website: https://www.bakercountyga.com/

Baker County is a county in Georgia. As of the 2020 census, the population was 2,876, making it the fifth-least populous county in Georgia. The county seat and only municipality is Newton. The county was created December 12, 1825, from the eastern portion of Early County by an act of the Georgia General Assembly and is named for Colonel John Baker, a hero of the American Revolutionary War.

Baker County is included in the Albany, GA metropolitan statistical area.

The Baker County Courthouse (Georgia) is listed on the National Register of Historic Places. Three other properties in Newton are also listed on the register: Notchaway Baptist Church and Cemetery, Pine Bloom Plantation, and Tarver Plantation.

== Geography ==
According to the U.S. Census Bureau, the county has a total area of 349 square miles (900 km^{2}), of which 342 square miles (890 km^{2}) is land and 7.2 square miles (19 km^{2}) (2.1%) is water.

The eastern half of Baker County is located in the Lower Flint River sub-basin of the ACF River Basin (Apalachicola-Chattahoochee-Flint River Basin). The western half of the county is located in the Ichawaynochaway Creek sub-basin of the same ACF River Basin.

=== Major highways ===
- State Route 37
- State Route 91
- State Route 200
- State Route 216
- State Route 253

=== Adjacent counties ===
- Dougherty County, Georgia - northeast
- Mitchell County, Georgia - east
- Decatur County, Georgia - southwest
- Early County, Georgia - west
- Miller County, Georgia - west
- Calhoun County, Georgia - northwest

== Communities ==
=== City ===
- Newton

=== Unincorporated communities ===
- Anna
- Bethany
- Crestview
- Elmodel
- Hardup
- Milford
- Patmos

=== Ghost towns ===
- Cheevertown
- Dewsville

== Demographics ==
Historical population
Census	Pop.	Note	%±
1830	1,253		—
1840	4,226		237.3%
1850	8,120		92.1%
1860	4,985		−38.6%
1870	6,843		37.3%
1880	7,307		6.8%
1890	6,144		−15.9%
1900	6,704		9.1%
1910	7,973		18.9%
1920	8,298		4.1%
1930	7,818		−5.8%
1940	7,344		−6.1%
1950	5,952		−19.0%
1960	4,543		−23.7%
1970	3,875		−14.7%
1980	3,808		−1.7%
1990	3,615		−5.1%
2000	4,074		12.7%
2010	3,451		−15.3%
2020	2,876		−16.7%
2025 (est.)	2,725	▼	−5.3%
U.S. Decennial Census; 1790-1880 1890-1910; 1920-1930 1930-1940; 1940-1950 1960-1980; 1980-2000 2010 2020

=== Racial and ethnic composition ===
Baker County, Georgia – Racial and ethnic composition Note: the US Census treats Hispanic/Latino as an ethnic category. This table excludes Latinos from the racial categories and assigns them to a separate category. Hispanics/Latinos may be of any race.
Race / Ethnicity (NH = Non-Hispanic)	Pop 1980	Pop 1990	Pop 2000	Pop 2010	Pop 2020	% 1980	% 1990	% 2000	% 2010	% 2020
White alone (NH)	1,897	1,745	1,889	1,642	1,514	49.82%	48.27%	46.37%	47.58%	52.64%
Black or African American alone (NH)	1,859	1,846	2,038	1,600	1,128	48.82%	51.07%	50.02%	46.36%	39.22%
Native American or Alaska Native alone (NH)	10	1	9	9	1	0.26%	0.03%	0.22%	0.26%	0.03%
Asian alone (NH)	2	2	0	24	18	0.05%	0.06%	0.00%	0.70%	0.63%
Native Hawaiian or Pacific Islander alone (NH)	x	x	1	2	0	x	x	0.02%	0.06%	0.00%
Other race alone (NH)	0	0	2	1	2	0.00%	0.00%	0.05%	0.03%	0.07%
Mixed race or Multiracial (NH)	x	x	24	28	70	x	x	0.59%	0.81%	2.43%
Hispanic or Latino (any race)	40	21	111	145	143	1.05%	0.58%	2.72%	4.20%	4.97%
Total	3,808	3,615	4,074	3,451	2,876	100.00%	100.00%	100.00%	100.00%	100.00%

=== 2020 census ===
As of the 2020 census, the county had a population of 2,876 and 788 families residing there. Of the residents, 20.9% were under the age of 18 and 22.8% were 65 years of age or older; the median age was 47.0 years. For every 100 females there were 91.4 males, and for every 100 females age 18 and over there were 89.6 males. 0.0% of residents lived in urban areas and 100.0% lived in rural areas.

The racial makeup of the county was 53.4% White, 39.3% Black or African American, 0.0% American Indian and Alaska Native, 0.6% Asian, 0.0% Native Hawaiian and Pacific Islander, 2.5% from some other race, and 4.1% from two or more races. Hispanic or Latino residents of any race comprised 5.0% of the population.

There were 1,187 households in the county, of which 28.3% had children under the age of 18 living with them and 33.9% had a female householder with no spouse or partner present. About 31.3% of all households were made up of individuals and 16.2% had someone living alone who was 65 years of age or older.

There were 1,447 housing units, of which 18.0% were vacant. Among occupied housing units, 71.2% were owner-occupied and 28.8% were renter-occupied. The homeowner vacancy rate was 0.2% and the rental vacancy rate was 9.0%.

== Education ==
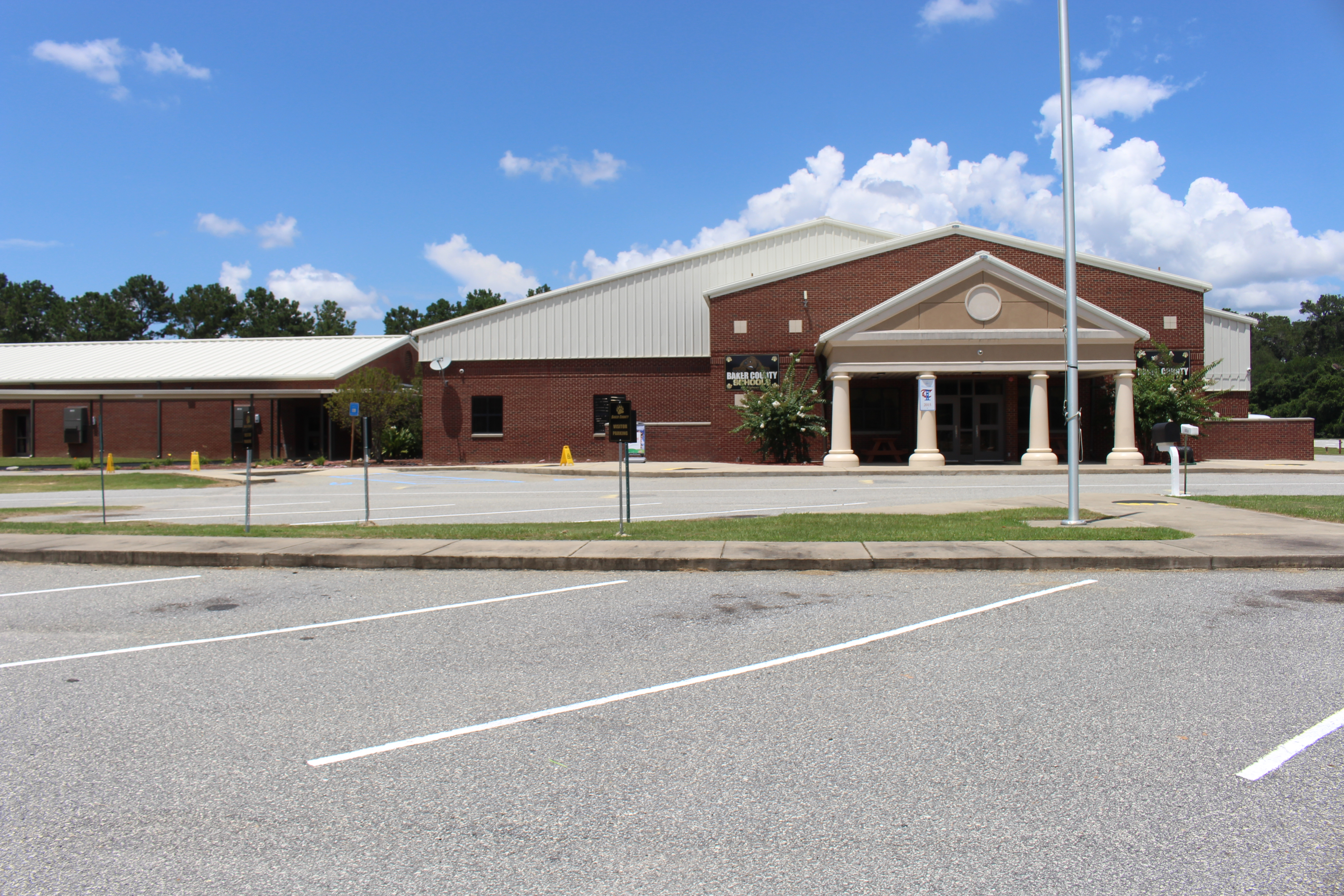
Baker County School System school building

Baker County School System operates public schools, including Baker County High School.

== Politics ==
As of the 2020s, Baker County is a Republican stronghold, voting 60% for Donald Trump in 2024. Like most Deep South counties, Baker County was historically Democratic voting. Starting in 1964, the county began to see a realignment, with Barry Goldwater and Richard Nixon carrying it in 1964 and 1972, and American Independent candidate George Wallace winning the county in 1968 as a third-party candidate. In 1956, Adlai Stevenson received over 96 percent of the county's vote. The county voted Democratic consistently from 1976 until 2012, but by closer margins than in 1956, and the county shifted more to the right throughout the early 2000s. In 2008 Barack Obama won with just 50.1 percent to John McCain's 49.1 percent, while Donald Trump won the county by almost ten percent in 2016, despite declining on Mitt Romney’s performance statewide. Brian Kemp repeated this feat by double digits in the 2018 gubernatorial race, and in 2020, Trump won Baker County by nearly sixteen percentage points.

For elections to the United States House of Representatives, Baker County is part of Georgia's 2nd congressional district, currently represented by Sanford Bishop. For elections to the Georgia State Senate, Baker County is part of District 12. For elections to the Georgia House of Representatives, Baker County is part of District 154.

United States presidential election results for Baker County, Georgia
Year	Republican		Democratic		Third party(ies)	
Year	No.	%	No.	%	No.	%
1912	5	2.66%	183	97.34%	0	0.00%
1916	94	17.77%	435	82.23%	0	0.00%
1920	80	36.20%	141	63.80%	0	0.00%
1924	21	7.69%	245	89.74%	7	2.56%
1928	99	17.65%	462	82.35%	0	0.00%
1932	2	0.31%	647	99.23%	3	0.46%
1936	13	2.12%	599	97.72%	1	0.16%
1940	30	5.10%	557	94.73%	1	0.17%
1944	31	6.09%	478	93.91%	0	0.00%
1948	7	2.47%	218	77.03%	58	20.49%
1952	155	13.36%	1,005	86.64%	0	0.00%
1956	32	3.93%	783	96.07%	0	0.00%
1960	66	8.40%	720	91.60%	0	0.00%
1964	914	60.33%	600	39.60%	1	0.07%
1968	99	5.78%	548	31.97%	1,067	62.25%
1972	965	73.66%	345	26.34%	0	0.00%
1976	305	20.79%	1,162	79.21%	0	0.00%
1980	510	32.61%	1,035	66.18%	19	1.21%
1984	675	49.41%	691	50.59%	0	0.00%
1988	629	46.66%	707	52.45%	12	0.89%
1992	391	26.63%	864	58.86%	213	14.51%
1996	408	27.66%	955	64.75%	112	7.59%
2000	615	40.49%	893	58.79%	11	0.72%
2004	821	46.52%	936	53.03%	8	0.45%
2008	828	49.02%	846	50.09%	15	0.89%
2012	785	49.34%	794	49.91%	12	0.75%
2016	775	53.82%	650	45.14%	15	1.04%
2020	897	57.68%	652	41.93%	6	0.39%
2024	883	59.82%	590	39.97%	3	0.20%

United States Senate election results for Baker County, Georgia2
Year	Republican		Democratic		Third party(ies)	
Year	No.	%	No.	%	No.	%
2020	873	56.91%	648	42.24%	13	0.85%
2020	809	56.22%	630	43.78%	0	0.00%

United States Senate election results for Baker County, Georgia3
Year	Republican		Democratic		Third party(ies)	
Year	No.	%	No.	%	No.	%
2020	413	27.28%	457	30.18%	644	42.54%
2020	815	56.60%	625	43.40%	0	0.00%
2022	711	56.93%	526	42.11%	12	0.96%
2022	651	57.51%	481	42.49%	0	0.00%

Georgia Gubernatorial election results for Baker County
Year	Republican		Democratic		Third party(ies)	
Year	No.	%	No.	%	No.	%
2022	755	60.02%	500	39.75%	3	0.24%

== See also ==
- National Register of Historic Places listings in Baker County, Georgia
- List of counties in Georgia
