= Anna, Georgia =

Coordinates: 31°16′01″N 84°08′55″W

Anna, Georgia Anna Community
- Unincorporated community
- Interactive map of Anna, Georgia
- Country: United States
- State: Georgia
- County: Baker
- Time zone: UTC-5 (Eastern (EST))
  - Summer (DST): UTC-4 (EDT)
- Area code: 229

Anna is an unincorporated community in Baker County, Georgia, United States.

== Geography ==
Anna is located on Georgia Route 200/Damascus Road. Jarvis Road, Hudson Road, Ethridge Road, Pine Hill Road, Collins Lane, Willow Nook Road, Hammil Road, and Rentz Bridge Road are just a few of the town's many paved and dirt roads.

== Civil ==
Anna had its own post office that was run by Benjamin N. Sanders (postmaster March 2, 1904). It discontinued mail to the Milford post office on May 15, 1905. It currently has a court house and various homes and abandoned structures. One particular building used to be a general store called Gain's Grocery. Rentz Bridge is one of the county's oldest bridges, and is located on Rentz Bridge Road in the community. Modernized in 1956, the bridge runs over the Ichauway Nochaway Creek.

== Churches ==
Live Oak Free Will Baptist church is Anna's community church. It was founded by Warren McDonald and built by Mood Richardson in 1884. In 1908 a second church building was constructed. It had two stories, the second being used for the Woodmen of the World's regular monthly meetings. In 1976 a third church building was erected, where it now sits today. The church got its name from the towering oak trees which stood at the left of the original structure.

== Demographics ==
As of 2011 all that remains of Anna is a small farming community.
