= Mill Creek Historic District =

Mill Creek Historic District may refer to:

== United States ==
(by state)

- Mill Creek Plantation, Thomasville, GA, a historic district listed on the NRHP in Georgia
- Mill Creek Park Historic District, Youngstown, OH, listed on the NRHP in Ohio
- Mill Creek Historic District (Bryn Mawr and Gladwyne, Pennsylvania), listed on the NRHP in Pennsylvania
- Mill Creek Historic District (Bunker Hill, West Virginia), listed on the NRHP in West Virginia
