= Screws v. United States =

- Supreme Court of the United States

Argued October 20, 1944 Decided May 7, 1945
- Full case name: Mack Claude Screws v. United States
- Citations: 325 U.S. 91 (more) 65 S. Ct. 1031; 89 L. Ed. 2d 1495

Case history
- Prior: 140 F.2d 662 (5th Cir. 1944).
- Procedural: Cert. granted, 322 U.S. 718 (1944).

Holding
- In general, a conviction under 18 U.S.C. §242 requires proof of the defendant's specific intent to deprive the victim of a federal right.

Court membership
- Chief Justice Harlan F. Stone Associate Justices Owen Roberts · Hugo Black; Stanley F. Reed · Felix Frankfurter; William O. Douglas · Frank Murphy; Robert H. Jackson · Wiley B. Rutledge

Case opinions
- Plurality: Douglas, joined by Stone, Black, Reed
- Concurrence: Rutledge
- Dissent: Murphy
- Dissent: Roberts, Frankfurter, Jackson

Laws applied
- Civil Rights Act of 1866

Screws v. United States, 325 U.S. 91 (1945), is a United States Supreme Court case that made it difficult for the federal government to prosecute local government officials for extrajudicial lynchings of African-Americans. The case overturned the conviction of Baker County, Georgia sheriff Claude Screws for violating the civil rights of Robert Hall, whom Screws and two deputies had lynched on the grounds of the Baker County Courthouse.

== Lynching of Robert Hall ==
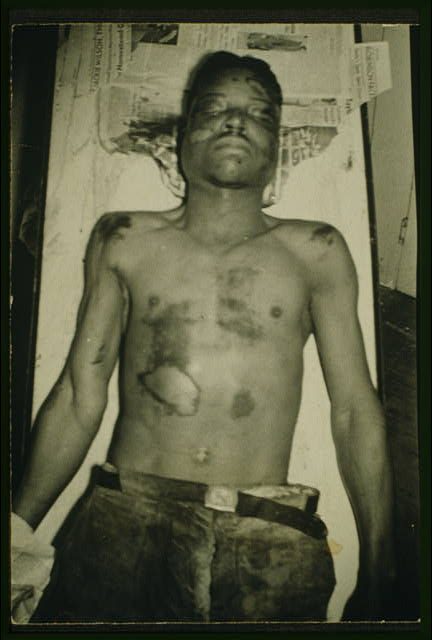
Postmortem photograph of police lynching victim Robert Hall

Robert "Bobby" Hall was an African American mechanic and World War II veteran. Hall acquired a .38 semi-automatic pistol with a pearl handle during his overseas service, and was harassed by county sheriff Claude M. Screws upon returning to Baker County, Georgia. Screws confiscated Hall's pistol out of a belief that Black Americans should not own firearms.

Robert Hall contacted a white attorney for assistance in the return of his firearm. Screws received a letter from Hall's lawyer on January 29, 1943, demanding that Hall, who had not been charged with any crime, have his property returned. The same day, Claude Screws produced a forged arrest warrant alleging Robert Hall had stolen a tire. Hall was subsequently arrested at his home by two deputies at the request of Screws. Upon arriving at the Baker County Courthouse grounds, the two deputies and the inebriated sheriff Claude Screws brutalized the handcuffed Hall for fifteen to thirty minutes in public view. Robert Hall fell unconscious during the beating, and died of his injuries within an hour.

== Procedural history ==
Following the lynching of Robert Hall, the local U.S. attorney convened a grand jury which indicted Screws, as well as Special Deputy Jim Bob Kelly and officer Frank Edward Jones, on charges of violating Hall's civil rights. All three men were convicted at the federal court house in Albany, Georgia. They were each sentenced to three years in federal prison and fined $1000. The conviction was upheld by the United States Court of Appeals for the Fifth Circuit and then appealed to the Supreme Court. While the case was moving through the courts Screws was reelected as sheriff by a very wide margin.

== Supreme Court ==
=== Plurality ===
Associate Justice William O. Douglas ruled that the federal government had not shown that Screws had the intention of violating Hall's civil rights when he killed him. This ruling greatly reduced the frequency with which federal civil rights cases were brought over the next few years.

=== Concurrence ===
In a concurring opinion, Associate Justice Wiley Rutledge rebutted Jackson's dissent that this judgement would upend the Constitution's principles of federalism, noting that federal prosecutors had rarely used this statute in the eighty years after its enactment. Despite favoring affirmation of the Fifth Circuit's decision, Rutledge explained his vote to accept a retrial as necessary to provide finality.

=== Dissents ===
Associate Justice Frank Murphy dissented, arguing that Section 20 of the Civil Rights Act of 1866 should be held as void for vagueness because of its broad criminalization of acts that deprive constitutional rights.

Associate Justice Robert H. Jackson wrote a separate dissenting opinion recounting the history of the Fourteenth Amendment as adopted to provide congressional power of enforcement over the Civil Rights Act of 1866. In Jackson's view, interpreting that statute as authorizing lynchings to be prosecuted as federal crimes, rather than their traditional classification as state affairs, would violate federalist principles. Historian Eric Foner criticized Jackson for claiming that "it is familiar history that much of the legislation was born of that vengeful spirit which to no small degree envenomed the Reconstruction era" without any citation to supporting the existence of such malicious legislative intent.

== See also ==
- List of United States Supreme Court cases, volume 325
- Enforcement Act of 1870
