= National Register of Historic Places listings in Douglas County, Georgia =

This is a list of properties and districts in Douglas County, Georgia that are listed on the National Register of Historic Places (NRHP).

This National Park Service list is complete through NPS recent listings posted May 16, 2025.

== Current listings ==
	Name on the Register	Image	Date listed	Location	City or town	Description
1	Basket Creek Cemetery	Basket Creek Cemetery	May 20, 2009 (#09000326)	7829 Capps Ferry Rd. 33°35′24″N 84°49′14″W	Douglasville	
2	Beulah Grove Lodge No. 372, Free and Accepted York Masons-Pleasant Grove School	Beulah Grove Lodge No. 372, Free and Accepted York Masons-Pleasant Grove School	February 3, 2010 (#09001301)	2525 Old Lower River Rd. 33°42′24″N 84°39′29″W	Douglasville	
3	John Thomas Carnes Family Log House	John Thomas Carnes Family Log House	July 25, 2001 (#01000762)	Clinton Nature Preserve, 8270 Ephesus Church Rd. 33°42′16″N 84°52′32″W	Winston	
4	Douglas County Courthouse	Douglas County Courthouse	October 24, 2002 (#02001216)	6754 W. Broad St. 33°44′59″N 84°45′01″W	Douglasville	
5	Douglasville Commercial Historic District	Douglasville Commercial Historic District	July 24, 1989 (#89000850)	Roughly bounded by Broad St., Adair St., Church St., and Club Dr. 33°45′03″N 84°44′56″W	Douglasville	
6	Pine Mountain Gold Mine	Pine Mountain Gold Mine	August 28, 2008 (#08000834)	1881 Stockmar Rd. 33°45′29″N 84°53′01″W	Villa Rica	
7	Col. William T. Roberts House	Col. William T. Roberts House	March 2, 1989 (#89000153)	8652 Campbellton St. 33°44′43″N 84°44′38″W	Douglasville	
8	Sweet Water Manufacturing Site	Sweet Water Manufacturing Site	November 23, 1977 (#77000421)	Address Restricted	Atlanta	Is in Sweetwater Creek State Park
