= Hardup, Georgia =

Coordinates: 31°16′01″N 84°08′55″W

Hardup, Georgia Hard Up community
- Unincorporated community
- Interactive map of Hardup, Georgia
- Country: United States
- State: Georgia
- County: Baker
- Time zone: UTC-5 (Eastern (EST))
  - Summer (DST): UTC-4 (EDT)
- Area code: 229

Hardup is an unincorporated community in Baker County, Georgia, United States.

== Geography ==
Hardup is located on Hard Up Road. Middle Road, River Road, County Line Road, Wildfair Road, and Colquitt-Ford Road also lie in the area.

Natural features include Cowan Shoals, Horseshoe Bend 1, Horseshoe Bend 2, Reflection Lake, and Buzzard Roost Island. Water features include Baptism Pond, Cassidy Pond, Berry Spring, Culpepper Spring, and Double Springs.

== Civil ==
Hardup had a post office that was founded on February 8, 1889. At the time the town had a population of 150 people. It was discontinued to Baconton on October 23, 1890.

== Cemeteries ==
Hardup cemeteries include Davis Cemetery and Hardup Cemetery.

== Churches ==
Hardup churches include Ephesus Church, Mount Airy Church, and Weldon Springs Church.

== Demographics ==
As of 2011 all that remains of Hardup is a small farming community.
