= Bethany, Georgia =

Coordinates: 31°16′01″N 84°08′55″W

Bethany, Georgia Bethany Community
- Unincorporated community
- Interactive map of Bethany, Georgia
- Country: United States
- State: Georgia
- County: Baker
- Time zone: UTC-5 (Eastern (EST))
  - Summer (DST): UTC-4 (EDT)
- Area code: 229

Bethany is an unincorporated community in Baker County, Georgia, United States.

== Geography ==
Bethany is located at the intersections of Will White Road, Big Oak Road, and Bethany Road. This area is known as 'six points'. Bogardus Road, Hamill Road, Rowe Taylor Road, Sanders Lane, Tom Sheffield Road, and Damascus Highway/Georgia Route 200 also rest in the area. It is located in Land Lot 326-District Seven of Baker County,

== Civil ==
Bethany at one time supported several filling stations and a general store. They now sit empty. The town is also full of many abandoned homes and barns. The town was once home to: Bethany Store, Bethany Gin, Bethany Grist Mill, Bethany Peanut Shelter, and Bethany Cucumber Grading and Packing Shed, all are now demolished.

== History ==
Bethany was founded in 1855 by James Blumer White, however the area was mostly woodland prior to 1850. Homesteaders were moving into Bethany via a land grant from the government during this period of the town's history. The settlers mostly came from South Carolina and North Carolina.

== Schools ==
In 1855, Blumer White built the first school house in the town, a small one-room log building, the building was also used as a church. (White being the school-master and J.E. Dykes being the pastor.) The area's last school to be built was Bethany Consolidated School. It contained grades 1-9 and employed five teachers. There has not been a school in the town since the 1940s.

== Churches ==
In the late 1890s, a one room large frame building with roughly sawn heart pine lumber was built and served as a Missionary Baptist Church. Bethany Baptist Church was founded on May 11, 1894, with eleven families in the town. The congregation built a church building in 1895 at the cost of $150.00 on land given by Mr. Morgan Rye. By the time the church was complete it had a total of twenty members. Mr. J.E. Dykes was the first moderator and pastor. The present church building was started in 1950 and dedicated in June 1951. Mrs. Lemuel Wright Parr (Nancy Elizabeth White) was the only living charter member to witness the dedication. Mr. Parr had supplied the lumber for the original church and Mrs. Parr made the first and last donations for the present brick church. One member, Jerome Ethredge, became a missionary and took residence in Togo, Africa. The church now sits defunct and unused. As of 2011 the steeple has begun to collapse. Pleasant Hill Missionary Baptist Church is the area's black church. It is still operational.

== Demographics ==
As of 2011, all that remains of Bethany is a small farming community. Few of the town's original features remain, except for a few abandoned farmhouses, a general store, and Bethany Baptist Church and Cemetery.
