= Elmodel, Georgia =

Elmodel
- Unincorporated community
- Location within the state of Georgia Elmodel (the United States)
- Coordinates: 31°20′45″N 84°28′21″W
- Country: United States
- State: Georgia
- County: Baker
- Elevation: 161 ft (49 m)
- Time zone: UTC-5 (Eastern (EST))
  - Summer (DST): UTC-4 (EDT)
- GNIS feature ID: 331656

Elmodel is an unincorporated community in northern Baker County, Georgia, United States. It lies on State Route 37 to the northeast of the city of Newton, the county seat of Baker County. Its elevation is 161 feet (49 m).

== History ==
A post office called Elmodel was established in 1904, and remained in operation until 1967. Elmodel most likely is an invented name.
