= Teel–Crawford–Gaston Plantation =

1836 former plantation in Georgia, US

- U.S. National Register of Historic Places
- Location within Georgia
- Nearest city: 2154 Georgia State Route 30 West, Americus, Sumter County, Georgia, U.S.
- Coordinates: 32.14444°N 84.39527°W
- Area: 850 acres (340 ha)
- Built: c. 1836
- Architectural style: Greek Revival
- NRHP reference No.: 04001188
- Added to NRHP: October 27, 2004

The Teel–Crawford–Gaston Plantation, also known as the John Teel Plantation, is a historic site and former plantation and built in c. 1836 in Americus, Sumter County, Georgia, U.S. It represents two major periods in the history of Georgia agricultural, the plantation system, and system of tenant farming. This site was worked by enslaved people. The Teel–Crawford–Gaston Plantation complex includes a main plantation house, outbuildings, farm fields, and a cemetery.

It has been listed on the National Register of Historic Places since October 27, 2004, for the building and landscape architecture, and contribution to African American history.

== History ==
John Teel, a native of North Carolina, purchased the property in 1836, and built the main house (c. 1836 – c. 1840) shortly thereafter. Teel funded the building of the Greek Revival-style house built with the labor of enslaved African Americans, using lumber from his property, and bricks made in the brickyard near his house. By 1850, he lived with his wife Mary, their nine children, and sixteen enslaved people. He continued to purchase surrounding properties to grow the farm land. The brickyard, farm land, main house, and cemetery were all labored by slaves.

In 1852, Teel sold the plantation to Shadrack and Lucina Crawford. After the American Civil War ended in 1865, the Crawford's turned property from a plantation based on slave labor, to a farm based on the tenant system.

In 1918, the Crawford sold the farm to Robert B. Gaston, who continued farming the land and using the tenant system until his death in 1925. Gaston built the existing outbuilding complex to support the tenant farm operation. In 2004, the Gaston family still owned the property and were actively farming.

== Cemetery ==
The "slave cemetery" is known from an oral tradition, and is located in the northwest corner of the property. It is unmarked, and the number of graves is unknown.

== See also ==
- List of cemeteries in Georgia (U.S. state)
- List of plantations in Georgia (U.S. state)
- National Register of Historic Places listings in Sumter County, Georgia
