= Savannah (film) =

- Film poster
- Directed by: Annette Haywood-Carter
- Written by: Annette Haywood-Carter; Ken Carter
- Based on: Ward Allen: Savannah River Market Hunter by John Eugene Cay Jr.
- Produced by: Annette Haywood-Carter; Randall Miller; Jody Savin
- Starring: Jim Caviezel; Chiwetel Ejiofor; Jaimie Alexander; Bradley Whitford; Sam Shepard; Tracey Walter; Jack McBrayer; Hal Holbrook
- Cinematography: Mike Ozier
- Edited by: John David Allen; Jonathan Alvord; Dan O'Brien
- Music by: Gil Talmi
- Production companies: Unclaimed Freight Productions; Meddin Studios
- Distributed by: Ketchup Entertainment
- Release date: August 23, 2013
- Running time: 101 minutes
- Country: United States
- Language: English

Savannah is a 2013 American historical family drama film directed, produced and written by Annette Haywood-Carter. It is based on the true story and the book Ward Allen: Savannah River Market Hunter by John Eugene Cay Jr. It stars Jim Caviezel, Jaimie Alexander, Chiwetel Ejiofor, Jack McBrayer and Sam Shepard. It was released by Ketchup Entertainment on August 23, 2013 in the US.

== Plot ==
Narrated by a 95-year-old Christmas Moultrie as he recalls his friendship long ago with Ward Allen in Savannah, Georgia, in the early 20th century. Ward was born into privilege in the mid-1800s but settled for a life of duck hunting, which found him in front of Judge Harden often. He was also found quite drunk, a point of tension with his wife Lucy, who married him to spite her father, who wanted her to marry Sir Graham. Their marriage is later tested by his hard-drinking ways, his devotion to his hunting, and her breakdown after a stillbirth.

== Cast ==
- Jim Caviezel as Ward Allen, an American naturalist, duck hunter and merchant
- Chiwetel Ejiofor as Christmas Moultrie, a former slave who becomes a friend of Ward
- Jaimie Alexander as Lucy Stubbs, wife of Ward Allen
- Jack McBrayer as Sir Graham, wealthy man Mr. Stubbs set Lucy up to marry
- Sam Shepard as Mr. Stubbs, Lucy's father
- Bradley Whitford as Jack Cay
- Hal Holbrook as Judge Harden
- Tracey Walter as Mathias
- Simone Griffeth as Mrs. Stubbs, Lucy's mother
- Stratton Leopold as John Elliot Ward

== Production ==
Annette Haywood-Carter signed on as the director and also helped produce the film, along with Randall Miller and Jody Savin. With the film based on the book Ward Allen: Savannah River Market Hunter, Haywood-Carter co-wrote the screenplay with Kenneth Carter. Gil Talmi signed on to do the music for the film while Mike Ozier was in charge of cinematography and John David Allen with editing. Ketchup Entertainment released the film, with Unclaimed Freight Productions producing in association with Meddin Studios.

Filming started in early 2011 and took 21 days to shoot. The film was shot at various Savannah locations.

== See also ==
- List of films featuring slavery
