= Richmond Oak Grove Plantation =

- Interactive map of Richmond Oak Grove Plantation
- State: Georgia
- Country: United States
- Coordinates: 32.1975°N 81.1627°W
- Disestablished: 20th century
- Area: 3,464 acres (1,402 hectares)
- Produces: Rice, silk, indigo and others

The Richmond Oak Grove Plantation was a historical plantation located on the Savannah River, near present-day Port Wentworth, Georgia. Richmond Oak Grove Plantation was at its largest size in the late-nineteenth century after three plantations – Richmond and Kew, Morton Hall and Oak Grove – consolidated into one plantation.

== History ==
=== Oakgrove and Morton Hall ===
Oakgrove and Morton Hall were plots of land in Joseph's Town that first appeared in 1735. The two plots were given to two Scottish brothers to be developed into plantations; the 500 acres (200 hectares) of Morton Hall were given to John Mackay and the adjoining 500 acres (200 hectares) of Oakgrove were given to Patrick Mackay. John would abandon his plot soon after it was granted to him and most documentation about his presence ceased. Starting operations with at least ten indentured servants, Patrick settled some of his property though quickly requested slaves from authorities after his servants died of sickness. Over the next decade, very little was produced at the plantations.

In 1749, the Georgia Trustees ended their ban on slavery. Mackay was later granted an additional 100 acres (40 hectares) of his brother's plot of land in 1756 and a year later, it was reported that he had owned "fifty-three negroes". Mackay was one of the first to introduce large-scale slavery in Georgia, owning hundreds of slaves. He often hid slaves from the Georgia Trustees, at times sneaking about one-hundred slaves across the Savannah River between the Province of Georgia and the Province of South Carolina in efforts to dodge investigations. Slaves were brought in from a port located on the plantation, with a main road lined with oak trees leading to a neighbor plantation, the Mulberry Grove Plantation. By 1763, it was advertisements about runaway slaves showed that slave quarters were probably present on the land. The two plantations would rapidly change ownership. John M. Berrien later obtained the plantations where he had about fifty slaves.

=== Richmond and Kew ===
The Richmond and Kew plots, comprising a large marsh only suitable for rice farming, did not see development until slavery was legalized in 1749. In 1772, the plantations were the most valuable in the parish with British loyalist Alexander Wright, son of governor of the province of Georgia James Wright, purchasing the land for 10,500 Pound sterling.

The plantations had a total area of 1,134 acres (459 hectares) and were later gifted to American general Anthony Wayne for his service in the American Revolutionary War after the plots were confiscated from Wright. Prior to the confiscation, Wright ordered British forces to destroy a barn, machinery, rice and other crops on the plantation.

The plantations were officially given to Wayne in 1786 and received loans from Dutch bankers. Wayne would later purchase slaves from Adam Tunno, records state that a "number of negroes" were present at the plantations, with the slaves tasked with farming and making various repairs. His plantations were ultimately unsuccessful as he made poor business decisions, lived elsewhere, did not visit frequently, acquired a large debt with repairs and to Tunno following his slave purchase, later begging various acquaintances to assist him with making payments. Wayne would sell the properties after President George Washington called for his leadership during the Northwest Indian War.

=== Consolidation ===
In 1890, the 1,134 acres (459 hectares) of Richmond and Kew, the 1,051 acres (425 hectares) Morton Hall, and the 1,279 acres (518 hectares) of Oak Grove were combined to create the Richmond Oak Grove Plantation, where it was later converted into a truck garden. By 1940, the plantation was abandoned.

== See also ==
- Plantation complexes in the Southern United States
- List of plantations in Georgia (U.S. state)
- List of plantations in the United States
