= Patmos, Georgia =

Unincorporated community in Georgia, U.S.

Coordinates: 31°22′34″N 84°33′54″W

Patmos is an unincorporated community in Baker County, in the U.S. state of Georgia.

== History ==
The community was named after the Greek island of Patmos, a place mentioned in the Bible.
