= Basket Creek Cemetery =

1886 cemetery in Georgia, US

- U.S. National Register of Historic Places
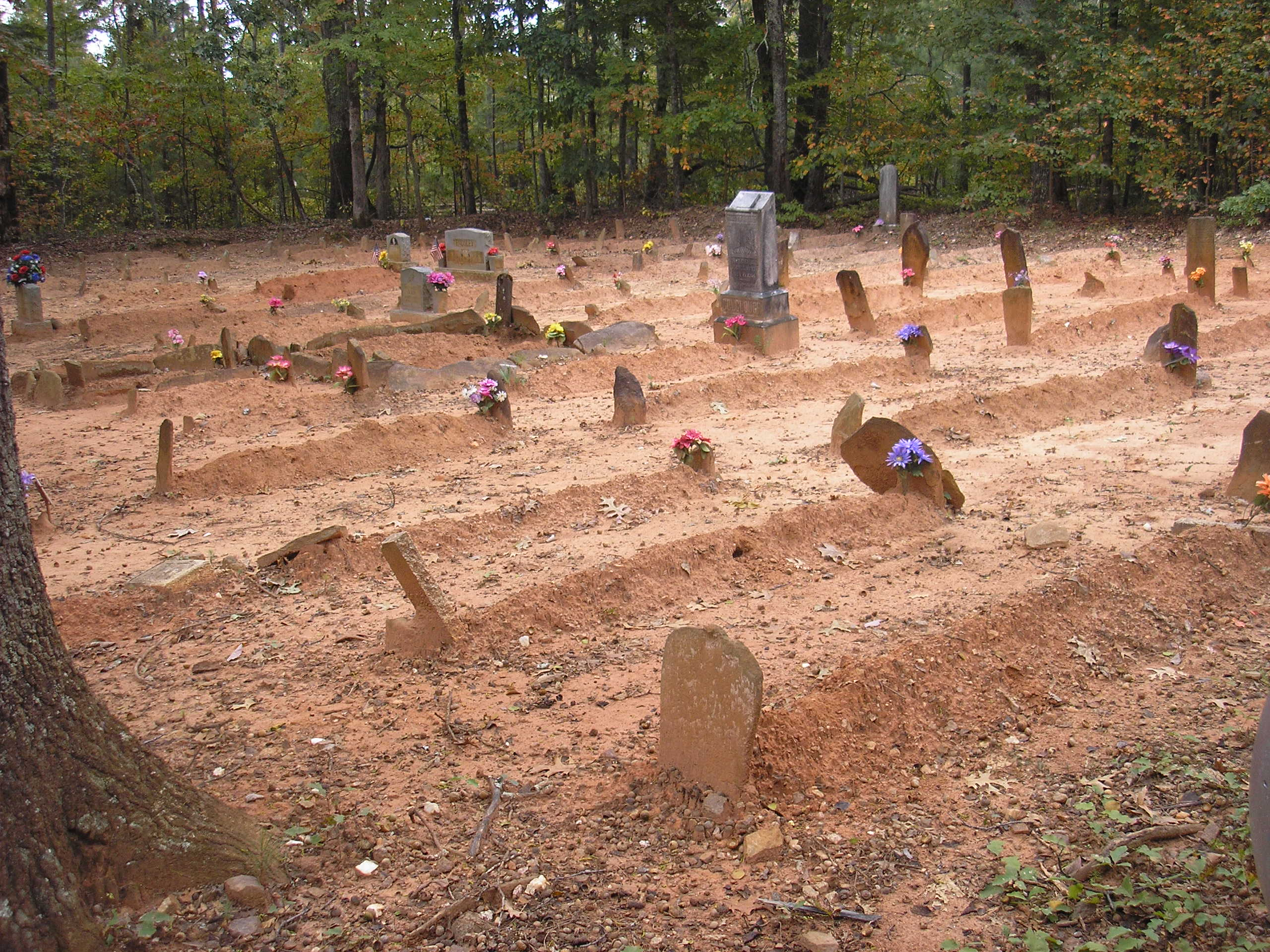
- Basket Creek Cemetery, 2012

- Location within Georgia
- Location: 7829 Capps Ferry Road
- Nearest city: Douglasville, Douglas County, Georgia, U.S.
- Coordinates: 33°36′23″N 84°49′40″W
- Area: less than one acre
- Built: 1886
- Architectural style: Southern Folk
- NRHP reference No.: 09000326
- Added to NRHP: May 20, 2009

Basket Creek Cemetery, also known as Basket Creek Baptist Church Cemetery, is a historic African American cemetery founded in 1886 and located on 7829 Capps Ferry Road near Douglasville in Douglas County, Georgia, U.S.. It is a Southern Folk-type of cemetery and still contains traditional grave mounds. It has been listed on the National Register of Historic Places since May 20, 2009, for its contribution to African American heritage.

== History ==
The Basket Creek Cemetery was founded in 1886, and is located near Douglasville, approximately 25 miles southwest of downtown Atlanta, Georgia. Positioned nearby is the Chapman Family Cemetery, a burial ground for a white family, which has no historical connection to the Basket Creek Cemetery.

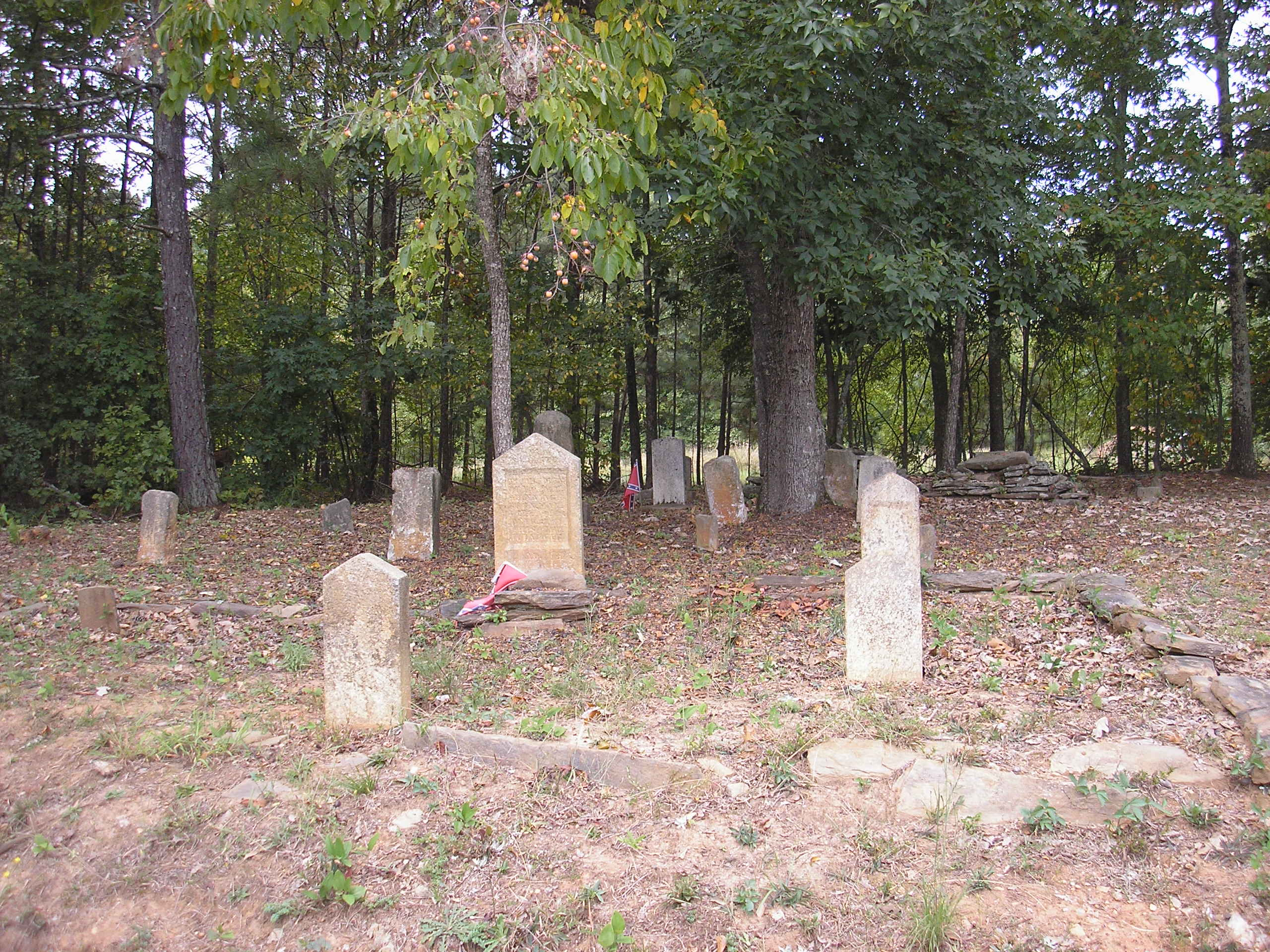
The Chapman Family Cemetery, located nearby

The Basket Creek Cemetery contains 110 known burials of Black members of the Basket Creek Baptist Church. This cemetery is classified as a Southern Folk-style, which is characterized by mounded graves, scraped ground, a hilltop location, east to west grave orientation, grave markers and decorations made by using materials locally available (not commercially sold), certain species of vegetation, the use of grave shelters, and the evidence of a devotion to God and/or family in the form of memorials. Some other traits of a Southern Folk type of cemetery include bordered family plots, wife-to-the-left burials, and feet-to-the-east burials.

This location is a rare example of the survival of the African American church funerary ritual of grave mounding, a practice which has roots in West Africa. The Basket Creek Cemetery is the only documented extant example of grave mounding in the state of Georgia.

== See also ==
- List of burial mounds in the United States
- Isaac Nettles Gravestones in Alabama
- National Register of Historic Places listings in Douglas County, Georgia
