= Crestview, Georgia =

Coordinates: 31°16′01″N 84°08′55″W

Crestview, Georgia Crestview Community
- Unincorporated community
- Interactive map of Crestview, Georgia
- Country: United States
- State: Georgia
- County: Baker
- Time zone: UTC-5 (Eastern (EST))
  - Summer (DST): UTC-4 (EDT)
- Area code: 229

Crestview is an unincorporated community in Baker County, Georgia, United States.

== Geography ==
Crestview is located at the intersections of Crestview Road, Willow Nook Road, and Crossroads Cemetery Road. The town is also full of various county dirt roads, such as Smith Lane. DeSoto Springs is the area's primary water source. It was a point at which Herman DeSoto took camp.

== Civil ==
Crestview is home to many abandoned buildings and homes. It has one store, D. G. Jones General Store, which is located on DeSoto Springs Plantation.

== Cemeteries ==
Taylor White Cemetery is the area's independent cemetery.

== Churches ==
The town is home to two churches: Christ Methodist Church (primarily White) and Christ Christian Methodist Episcopal (CME) Church (primarily Black). Before the Civil War, Christ Methodist was attended by both White plantation owners and Black slaves. Then it was no more than a hand-hewn log structure. At the close of the war the freed Blacks formed their own church five miles from the original site. The land was provided by a White planter. This building was destroyed by fire along with all of the church records, a new church was built and remained until the early 1940s. The present church is a continuation of the old Christ CME Church, it sits on a two-acre land plot and was rebuilt off of Crestview Road. Christ CME Church was built circa 1850 of hand hewn logs and board shutters for window covers. The church membership consisted of both Whites and their Black slaves. During the Civil War, the church was used as a safe-haven for Confederate soldiers. The old structure was used until the 1880s and then fell into disuse. The church was moved to its present site on 1899 due to the cemetery being already present. It was settled on a hill because the soggy ground during a heavy rains period made it hard to sink bodies. Before the church was built the cemetery was known as Calhoun Cemetery. The new church building was completed in 1901.

== Demographics ==
As of 2011 all that remains of Crestview is a small farming community.
