= Magnolia Cemetery (Augusta, Georgia) =

Historic cemetery in Augusta, Georgia

Coordinates: 33.4626°N 81.9569°W

- Interactive map of Magnolia Cemetery

Details
- Established: August 1818
- Location: Augusta, Georgia
- Size: 60 acres (24 ha)

Magnolia Cemetery is a historic cemetery located in Augusta, Georgia. It was officially founded in August 1818. This cemetery features two mausoleums. Spanning over 60 acres, it is home to the final resting place of seven Confederate Generals, five Jewish cemeteries, a Greek Cemetery, and the oldest tree in the state of Georgia.

== History ==
The land where Magnolia Cemetery is located was at one time part of a plantation with the first official burial in August 1818. Academy of Richmond County owned the first two blocks and they sold it to the City Council of Augusta for $800 in 1817.

== Notable interments ==
- Edward Porter Alexander, Confederate Brigadier General
- Ward Allen, duck hunter and merchant
- Goode Bryan, Confederate General
- Victor Girardey, Confederate Brigadier General
- Paul Hamilton Hayne, poet
- John King Jackson, Confederate Brigadier General
- James Ryder Randall, poet and educator
- William Duncan Smith, Confederate General
- Marcellus A. Stovall, Confederate General
- Thomas Wightman, painter
- Ambrose Wright, Confederate Major General
