= Tarver Plantation =

Historic house in Georgia, United States

- U.S. National Register of Historic Places
- U.S. Historic district
- Location within Georgia Location within the United States
- Location: Tarva Rd./Co. Rt. 122, N of Newton, Georgia in Baker County at the county line with Dougherty County
- Coordinates: 31.424722°N 84.346667°W
- Area: 1,300 acres (5.3 km^{2})
- Built: c.1850
- Architectural style: Greek Revival
- NRHP reference No.: 89002037
- Added to NRHP: November 27, 1989

The Tarver Plantation, also known as Tarva Plantation, located on Tarva Rd. (Co. Rt. 122) north of Newton in Baker County, Georgia includes a plantation house built in about 1850. It was listed on the National Register of Historic Places in 1989.

It was owned and used by Henry Tarver from about 1850 to 1897. In 1850 Henry Tarver owned 87 slaves.

It includes Greek Revival architecture. In 1989 the property included one contributing building and five non-contributing ones.
