= Col. William T. Roberts House =

- U.S. National Register of Historic Places
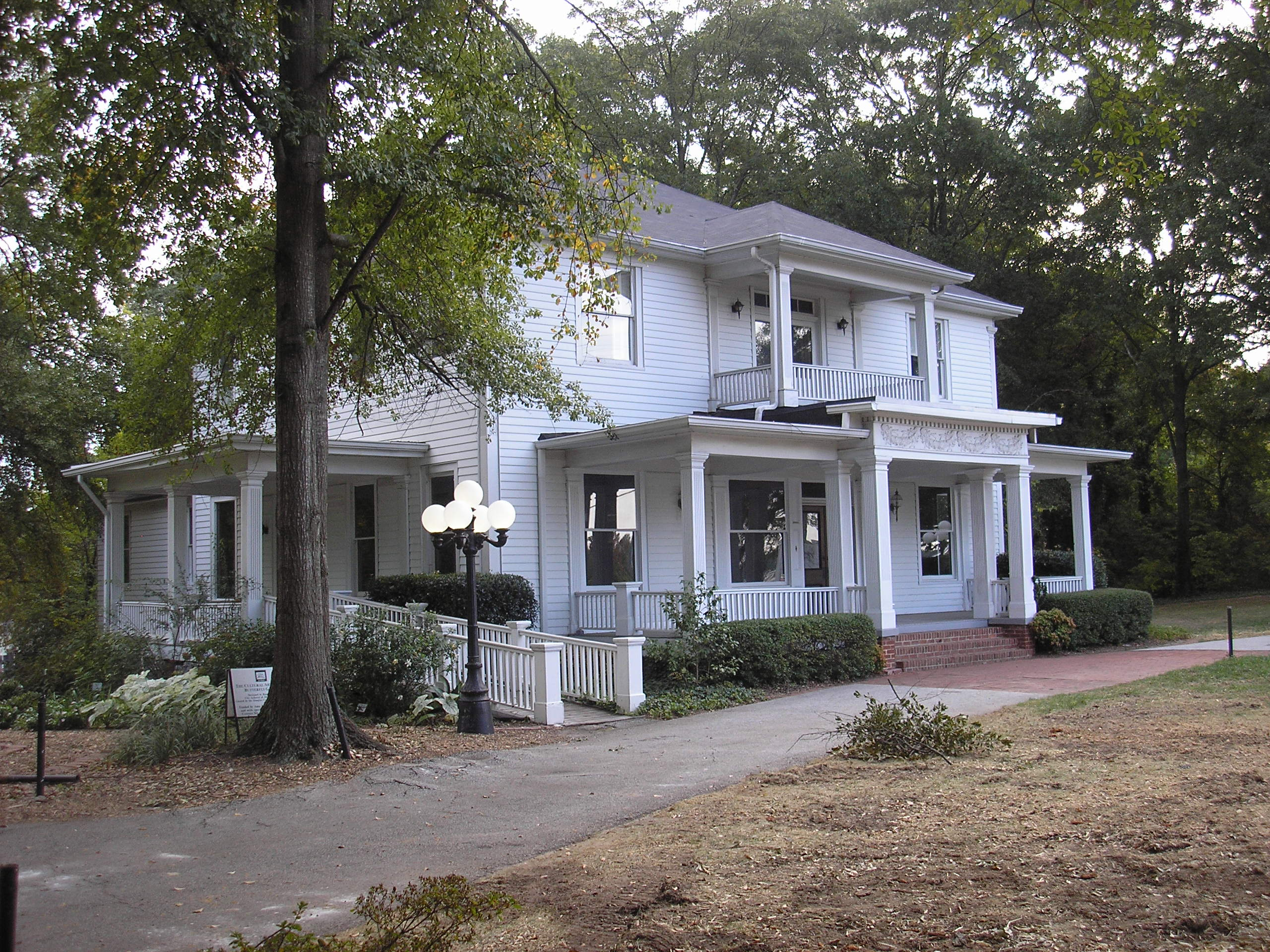

- Location within Georgia
- Location: 8652 Campbellton St., Douglasville, Georgia
- Coordinates: 33°44′43″N 84°44′38″W
- Area: 1.5 acres (0.61 ha)
- Built: 1901
- Architectural style: Classical Revival
- NRHP reference No.: 89000153
- Added to NRHP: March 2, 1989

The Col. William T. Roberts House, at 8652 Campbellton St. in Douglasville, Georgia, was built in 1901. It was listed on the National Register of Historic Places in 1989.

It is a two-story wood-frame house built in restrained version of Classical Revival style. It has a central hall, four-over-four plan. It has a full-width one-story front porch with a covered balcony above, and two side porches.

It was built to serve as home of Colonel William T. Roberts (1858-1932) and his family, who had been Mayor of Douglasville, state representative for the county, and county solicitor. He lived here from 1901 to 1914, during which rose to national prominence. He was elected Solicitor General, i.e. a district attorney, for a multiple county area for two terms during 1895–1903, and elected State Senator for 1911–1912. In 1914, President Woodrow Wilson appointed him to serve as attorney with the new Federal Trade Commission, and he moved to Washington, D.C. The National Register nomination states "he was the only known local Douglas County official to move up the political ladder to a national job, and one of the few in Georgia; especially in the half century following the Civil War."
