= William S. Simmons Plantation =

Historic house in Georgia, United States

- U.S. National Register of Historic Places
- William S. Simmons Plantation

- Location within Georgia Location within the United States
- Location: Alabama St., Cave Spring, Georgia
- Coordinates: 34°6′3″N 85°20′41″W
- Built: 1840
- Architectural style: Greek Revival
- MPS: Cave Spring MRA
- NRHP reference No.: 80001061
- Added to NRHP: June 19, 1980

The William S. Simmons Plantation, also known as the Wesley House, is a Greek Revival brick home located in Cave Spring, Georgia, United States, North America. The home was built in the 1840s, prior to the American Civil War, and was listed on the National Register of Historic Places in 1980.

== Description ==
The home is relatively unchanged from the time of its construction. The house was built with handmade brick and has interior walls 14 inches (36 cm) thick. The interior walls are plaster on brick. Three rooms and the foyer feature hand-painted wall treatments created in the mid-19th century. The most elaborate painting is found in the parlor, where an unknown artisan used blue, lavender, burgundy, and gold leaf to create beautiful designs throughout, including a detailed cross motif above the door.

The ceiling in the parlor is also decorated with gold leaf and the mantle features a faux marble finish which has deteriorated, but is still visible. Several doors in the house were decorated using a technique known as faux bois, or painting a common wood to look like a finer wood. In the William S. Simmons plantation, this technique was used to add wood grain and even the appearance of panels to several doors.

The home is a traditional two-story Georgia central hall plan which features a main hall running from the front to the back of the house, with four symmetrical rooms on each floor. The central hall contains a hand carved staircase leading to the second floor. There is an additional staircase located off the living room which leads to a private upstairs bedroom, believed to have originally served as a nursery.

The home has heart pine floors throughout with one foot (30 cm) wide baseboards, door trim, and window casements. Each of the eight rooms features a fireplace. In all but one room, the mantles are hand carved. The eighth room, currently used as a kitchen, has a stone fireplace and hearth.

The home also has a daylight basement accessed by a narrow stairway off the central hall. The basement has a masonry floor and an additional fireplace. There is a door which once led outside, but now opens under a 20th-century bathroom addition to the home. The door most likely was once used to bring food into the home from a brick cookhouse located behind the main house.

The brick cookhouse is known as the "Cherokee Kitchen". According to legend, Cherokee Indian sub-chief David Vann lived in this structure at one time. David Vann served as treasurer of the Cherokee nation and Vann's Valley, where Cave Spring is now located, is named for him. The cookhouse is constructed of the same handmade brick used in the building of the main house. It has two rooms with large fireplaces, one with a built-in oven.

== History ==
In A History of Rome and Floyd County Volume I, reference is made to David Vann living temporarily at "The Lake House" in Cave Spring. Although "The Lake House" could refer to James Lake, an early Cave Spring settler, it is not known whether Lake himself built the extant structures on the William S. Simmons plantation.

What is known is that Armstead Richardson, another early settler and founder of Cave Spring, settled in Vann's Valley in 1828 and amassed a large amount of land.

Richardson sold this land to William S. Simmons, who in turn sold the land to Carter W. Sparks. Lake bought the property from Sparks in 1849. It is not known for certain whether Simmons, Carter, or Lake built the plantation home. Not only an early settler, Lake served on the Board of Commissioners for the Cave Spring School of the Deaf, then known as the Georgia Institution for the Education of the Deaf and Dumb.

The property remained in the Lake family until 1875, when all 240 acres (97 ha) and structures were sold to W.T. Gibson. Gibson then sold the property to Green Cunningham. Upon his death in 1885, his niece Willie P. Montgomery inherited the property.

Montgomery sold the property in 1937 to her daughter, Lucille Montgomery. J.H. Wesley purchased the home and land from Montgomery in 1969.

The plantation home remained in the Wesley family until 2008, when only the house, including the Cherokee kitchen, was sold. The Wesley family still retains ownership of over two hundred acres (80 ha) surrounding the historic structures.
