= John Eugene Cay Jr. =

American author

- Born: October 10, 1914; Savannah, Georgia, U.S.
- Died: October 3, 1989 (aged 74); Hilton Head Island, South Carolina, U.S.
- Occupation: Author

John Eugene Cay Jr. (October 10, 1914 – October 3, 1989) was an American author. His most notable work was the 1958 publication Ward Allen: Savannah River Market Hunter, which was the basis for the 2013 movie Savannah. He was also an insurance executive and civic leader.

== Life and career ==
Cay was born in Savannah, Georgia, in 1914, to John Sr. and Caroline Elizabeth Palmer. He had one sibling, sister Armin, who was eight years his junior and named for their maternal grandfather, Armin B. Palmer.

He attended Episcopal High School in Alexandria, Virginia.

After graduating from the University of North Carolina at Chapel Hill, in 1937 Cay began working for Palmer & Cay, a real-estate and insurance company formed by his father and grandfather in 1915. In 1947, he became its chairman of the board and president. It was also known as Cay/Carswell Inc. during its existence. He was also a president of Savannah's Board of Education and the city's Chamber of Commerce, as well as being a member of the Historic Savannah Foundation and Christ Church. He was also a founder and the first chairman of the Savannah Country Day School.

In 1938, he married Barbara Alexander Hilton, daughter of Thomas and Elizabeth Ficklen Hilton, at Christ Church. The two families were neighbors on Atlantic Avenue in Savannah's Ardsley Park. They had four children: Caroline Hilton (born 1940), Barbara Lachlison (1941), John Eugene III (1945) and Elizabeth Mason (1949).

He was awarded, in 1954, the Lucas Trophy, which is the "oldest and most honored award given by the city of Savannah."

He released his book Ward Allen: Savannah River Market Hunter in 1958, and the same year won the Dunlap Award. It recognized him as Georgia's outstanding insurance underwriter.

== Death ==
Cay died in 1989 in Hilton Head Island, South Carolina, from a brain tumor. He was 74. He is interred in Savannah's Bonaventure Cemetery. His wife survived him by six years, and was buried beside him.

In 2005, John III, along with his sons Christopher and Jack, established the Barbara and Jack Cay Fund at the Georgia Historical Society.

== Bibliography ==
- Ward Allen: Savannah River Market Hunter (1958)
- Ducks, Dogs and Friends (1979)
