= Pine Bloom Plantation =

Historic house in Georgia, United States

- U.S. National Register of Historic Places
- U.S. Historic district
- Location within Georgia Location within the United States
- Nearest city: Newton, Georgia
- Coordinates: 31.40467°N 84.32934°W
- Area: 2,000 acres (8.1 km^{2})
- Built: 1850
- Architectural style: Greek Revival
- NRHP reference No.: 90000105
- Added to NRHP: February 9, 1990

The Pine Bloom Plantation, also known as Pinebloom Plantation, is a historic site in Newton, Georgia. It was added to the National Register of Historic Places on February 9, 1990. It is located on Tarva Road and County Route 122, 3/4 of a mile south of the Baker County, Georgia/ Dougherty County, Georgia line in Baker County. The site includes Greek Revival architecture, is associated with Gov. Alfred Holt Colquitt, and dates to about 1850. The plantation was purchased by billionaire John M. Harbert of Birmingham, Alabama in 1981.

The property included two contributing buildings and 16 non-contributing buildings and structures, including a modern skeet range. The main plantation house is a one-story raised wood-frame U-shaped building with Greek Revival detailing built in about 1850. It has a columned front portico and a hipped roof.

== See also ==
- National Register of Historic Places listings in Baker County, Georgia
