= Milford, Georgia =

Unincorporated community in Georgia, U.S.

Coordinates: 31°22′54.64″N 84°32′36.69″W

Milford is an unincorporated community in Baker County, in the U.S. state of Georgia.

== History ==
A post office called Milford was established in 1852, and remained in operation until 1955. The community took its name from a gristmill at a ford on Itchawaynochaway Creek.
