= South Bend Cemetery =

Cemetery in Atlanta, Fulton County, Georgia, US

Coordinates: 33°41′41″N 84°21′35″W

South Bend Cemetery (also known as Old South Bend Cemetery and Silver Brook Cemetery) is a cemetery in Atlanta, Georgia, near the Federal Penitentiary. The cemetery dates to the 1800s and was maintained by the South Bend Methodist Church, which was located about six blocks southwest at 850 Mcwilliams Road. The church disbanded in the 1990s. By 2008 the cemetery was overgrown. A group of volunteers cleared the overgrowth during 2008–2011.
