= Box Hall Plantation =

Historic house in Georgia, United States

- U.S. National Register of Historic Places
- U.S. Historic district
- Location within Georgia Location within the United States
- Location: Lower Cairo Rd. at Pinetree Blvd., Thomasville, Georgia
- Coordinates: 30.82904°N 84.01358°W
- Area: 135 acres (55 ha)
- Built: 1930-31
- Architect: Delano & Aldrich
- Architectural style: Colonial Revival, Georgian Revival
- NRHP reference No.: 89002015
- Added to NRHP: November 16, 1989

Box Hall Plantation in Thomasville, Georgia is notable for its main house built in Georgian Revival style designed by New York architects Delano & Aldrich and built during 1930–31. It replaced the first "big house", named Box Hall, which was built on the property in 1857 by A. T. MacIntyre and his wife, the former America Young. That house was lost in a fire around 1929.

The listing includes seven contributing buildings, two contributing structures, and a contributing site.
