= Baker County High School (Newton, Georgia) =

Baker County School

Location
- 400 Hillcrest Drive; Newton, Georgia 39870; United States
- Coordinates: 31°18′41″N 84°20′40″W

Information
- Type: K-12 school
- School district: Baker County School District
- CEEB code: 112269
- Teaching staff: 26.30 (FTE)
- Grades: K-12
- Enrollment: 293 (2023-2024)
- Student to teacher ratio: 11.14
- Colors: Black, gold, white
- Team name: Bears
- Website: www.baker.k12.ga.us

Baker County School is a k-12 school in Newton, Georgia, United States.

Its sports teams are known as the Bears.
