= Melrose and Sinkola Plantations =

Historic houses in Georgia, United States

- U.S. National Register of Historic Places
- U.S. Historic district
- Location within Georgia Location within the United States
- Location: 3.75 miles (6.04 km) SW, on US 319, of Thomasville, Georgia
- Coordinates: 30°47′24″N 84°03′17″W
- Area: 1,500 acres (610 ha)
- Architect: Walker & Weeks
- Architectural style: Colonial Revival, Greek Revival, Georgian Revival
- NRHP reference No.: 89002275
- Added to NRHP: January 4, 1990

The Melrose and Sinkola Plantations, in Thomas County, Georgia, a property of 1,500 acres (610 ha), was listed on the National Register of Historic Places in 1990.

The listed area included 50 contributing buildings, three contributing structures, and one contributing site.

A work by architects Walker & Weeks is included.
