= Mulberry Grove Plantation =

Historic house in Georgia, United States

Coordinates: 32°11.4′N 81°9.6′W

- Mulberry Grove Site
- U.S. National Register of Historic Places
- Location within Georgia Location within the United States
- Nearest city: Port Wentworth, Georgia
- Area: 153 acres (62 ha)
- NRHP reference No.: 75000575
- Added to NRHP: July 17, 1975

Mulberry Grove Plantation, located north of Port Wentworth, Chatham County, Savannah, was a rice plantation, notable as the location where Eli Whitney invented the cotton gin.

Once a thriving plantation, comprising, in 1798, some

... 500 acres of river swamp, under good dams and well drained; and 200 acres of upland, in good order for cotton or provisions. The remaining part of the tract, which contains in the whole more than 2000 acres, consists of oak and hickory, and well timbered pine land. There is a large and complete water machine for cleaning out rice, with barns, overseers houses, and other suitable plantation buildings, well constructed, and in good repair. There is also a convenient and well finished Dwelling House with suitable outbuildings, and an excellent garden, containing a variety of shrubs and trees both for use and ornament.

Mulberry Grove has been left to ruins, surrounded by industrial areas, and all that remains is a bronze marker outlining the history of the plantation.

Richmond Oak Grove Plantation, where large-scale slavery was brought into the state, was adjacent to Mulberry Grove.

== History ==
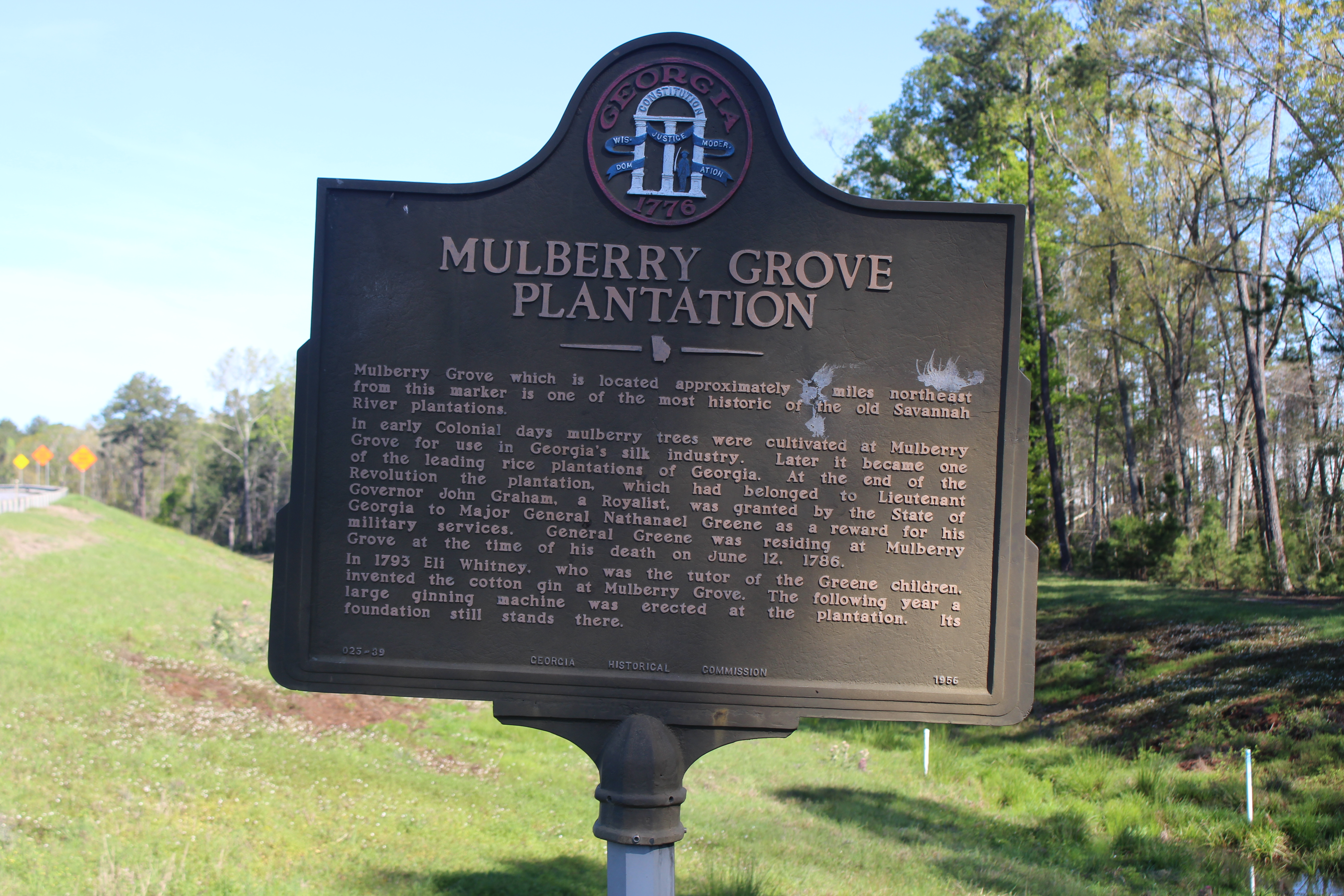
Historic marker for Mulberry Grove Plantation

Mulberry Grove was part of the Joseph's Town settlement, and was constructed to be a silk plantation. By 1740, the plantation was experimenting with planting rice, and upon the introduction of slavery to Georgia, the mulberry nursery was abandoned and rice production became the main purpose of the plantation.

Having been the home of Lieutenant-Governor John Graham (1718–1795) from 1744, the plantation was forfeited to the State of Georgia. After the Revolutionary War, Mulberry Grove was deserted, and on April 13, 1782, the State Legislature passed an act appropriating five thousand guineas to be used in purchasing the estate for General Nathanael Greene in recognition of his contributions to the war.

In 1791, President George Washington visited Mulberry Plantation after Greene's death five years earlier, noting in his diary that he,

"called upon Mrs. Greene the Widow of the deceased Genl. Greene, (at a place called Mulberry Grove) and asked her how she did," and that on the departing from Savannah for Augusta he had the pleasure of "dining at Mulberry Grove the Seat of Mrs. Greene ... "

Eli Whitney was a guest at the plantation, during which time he constructed the idea of the cotton gin.

"I ... struck out a plan of a Machine in my mind which I communicated to Miller (who is agent to the Executors of Genl. Greene and resides in the family, a man of respectability and property) he was pleased with the Plan and said if I would pursue it and try an experiment to see if it would answer, he would be at the whole expense, I should loose nothing but my time, and if I succeeded we would share the profits."

The plantation's prosperity, largely built on slavery, ended with the Civil War, after which the estate was gradually broken up.

A storm in the early 20th century partially wrecked the plantation, and it was not rebuilt. By 1913, the property was owned by Van R. Winkler (1842–1917), whose father, Zacharaiah (1799–1867), owned the plantation in the mid-19th century.

A bronze marker, placed in 1938 on the spot where the old avenue joined into the Augusta Road, is all that indicates the location of the historic estate.

== See also ==
- Christmas Moultrie, the last child born into slavery at the plantation
