= Baker County Courthouse (Georgia) =

- U.S. National Register of Historic Places
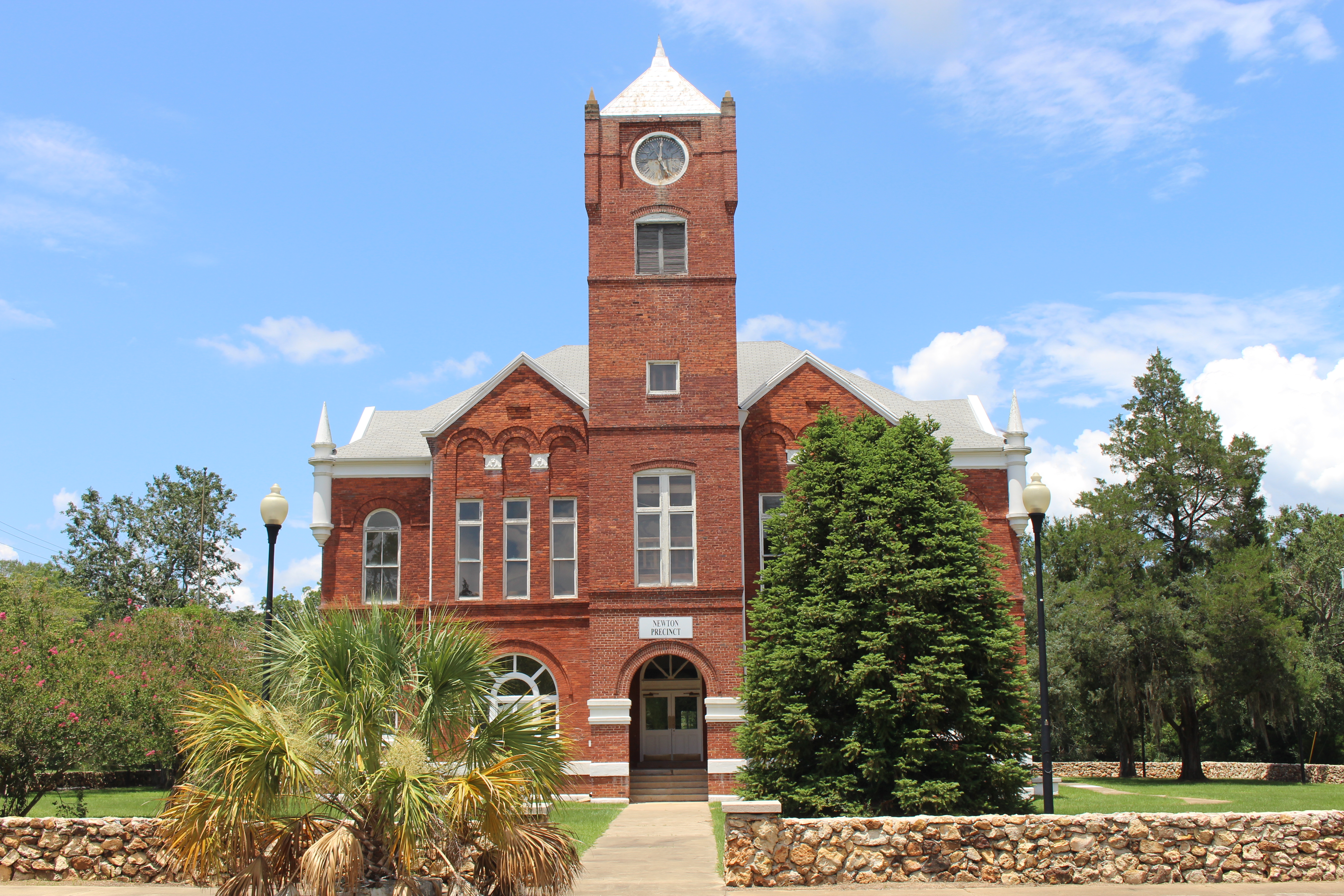
- Baker County Courthouse, Newton

- Location within Georgia Location within the United States
- Location: Courthouse Sq., Newton, Georgia
- Coordinates: 31°18′51″N 84°20′7″W
- Area: 1 acre (0.40 ha)
- Built by: Atlanta Fireproofing Co.
- Architect: Golucke, J.W. & Co.
- Architectural style: Romanesque
- MPS: Georgia County Courthouses TR
- NRHP reference No.: 80004443
- Added to NRHP: September 18, 1980

The Baker County Courthouse is located in Courthouse Square at Newton in Baker County, Georgia. It was added to the National Register of Historic Places on September 18, 1980. Baker County has been struck by flooding from the Flint River. The old courthouse was built in 1906 and was damaged by the floods of 1925, 1929, and 1994. It houses the public library and the historical society. The current courthouse is located in a 1930s-era school. The old courthouse was designed by J. W. Golucke. The courthouse was damaged during Hurricane Michael in October 2018.

== See also ==
- Lynching of Robert Hall: occurred on the grounds of the courthouse
