= Notchaway Baptist Church and Cemetery =

Historic site in Baker County, Georgia, US

- U.S. National Register of Historic Places
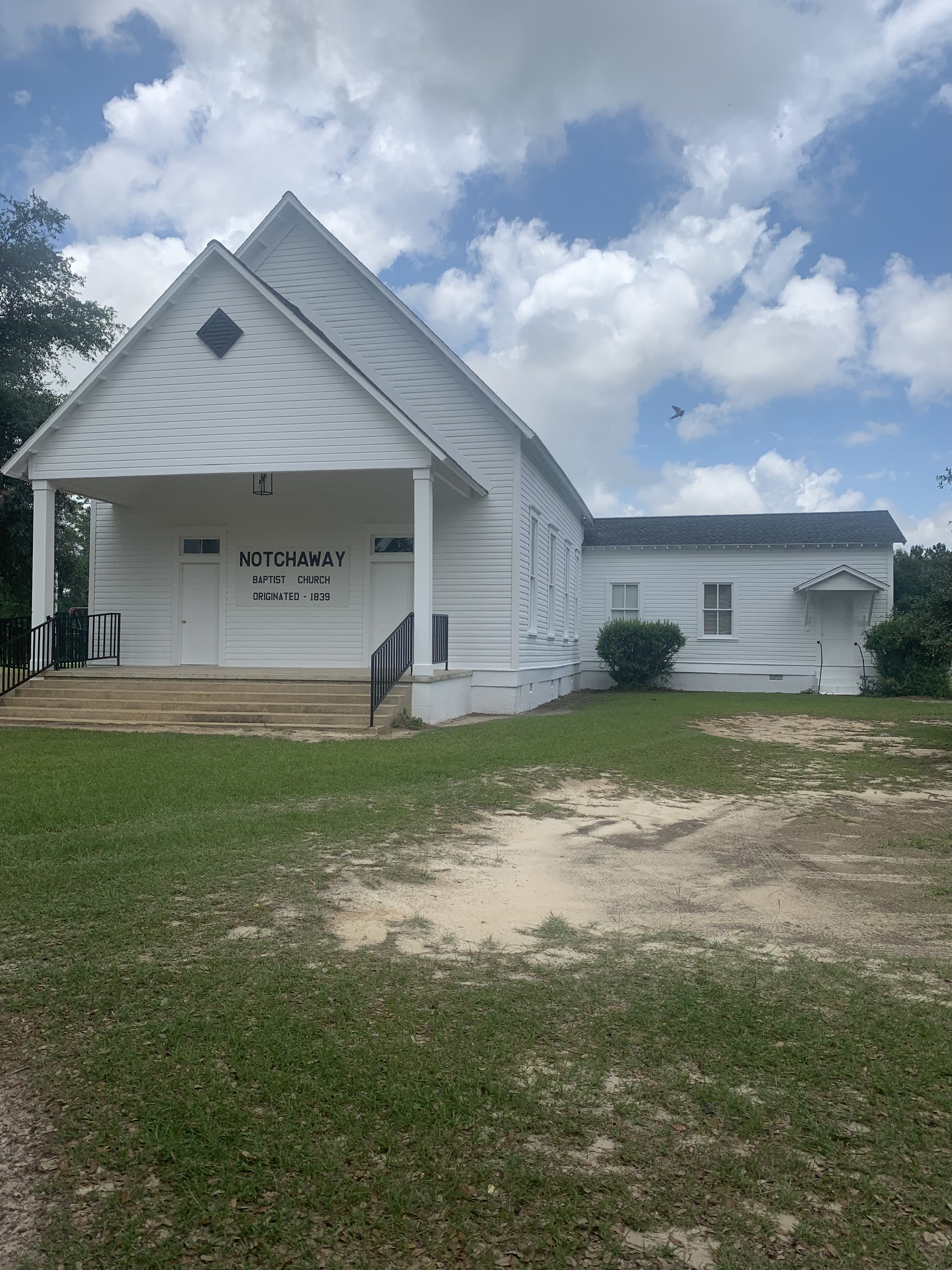

- Location within Georgia
- Nearest city: Newton, Georgia
- Coordinates: 31°11′28″N 84°31′3″W
- Area: 2.5 acres (1.0 ha)
- Built: 1896
- NRHP reference No.: 01000534
- Added to NRHP: May 25, 2001

Notchaway Baptist Church and Cemetery is a historic church and cemetery located southwest of Newton, Georgia on Georgia Highway 91. It was added to the National Register of Historic Places on May 25, 2001. It is located at the Junction of GA 91 and GA 253. The church congregation may have been established in 1839.

The church building, located in a rural area, is a one-story, wood-framed structure built in 1896. It has a steep gable-front roof and wide cornice trim. It was expanded with a rear ell added in 1960 and a smaller addition in 1977. The church is on a concrete block foundation which was put in to replace original tree stump piers. It has original wood shutters. The interior has an open sanctuary with a pulpit and three rows of original pine pews. Its hanging light fixtures were installed when electricity was added to the church in 1940.

== See also ==
- National Register of Historic Places listings in Baker County, Georgia
