= Mill Creek Plantation =

Historic house in Georgia, United States

- U.S. National Register of Historic Places
- U.S. Historic district
- Location within Georgia Location within the United States
- Location: 100 Mill Creek Plantation, Thomasville, Georgia
- Coordinates: 30°46′03″N 83°55′36″W
- Area: 193.8 acres (78.4 ha)
- Built: 1938
- Architect: S. Ralph Fetner
- Architectural style: Tudor Revival
- NRHP reference No.: 97000300
- Added to NRHP: April 14, 1997

Mill Creek Plantation, also known as Greenridge Plantation, near Thomasville in Thomas County, Georgia, is a 193.8 acres (78.4 ha) property which is listed on the National Register of Historic Places.

It includes a Tudor Revival mansion designed by S. Ralph Fetner. The property includes six contributing buildings and three contributing structures, as well as seven non-contributing buildings and structures.

In 1997, at the time of its NRHP listing, it was one of 71 operating plantations in the Red Hills region, which spans from Thomasville to Tallahassee, Florida. The property was deemed significant for the architecture of the house, and in the area of recreation/entertainment as one of few surviving plantations in the Red Hills region which was developed for game bird hunting.
