= Newton, Georgia =

- City
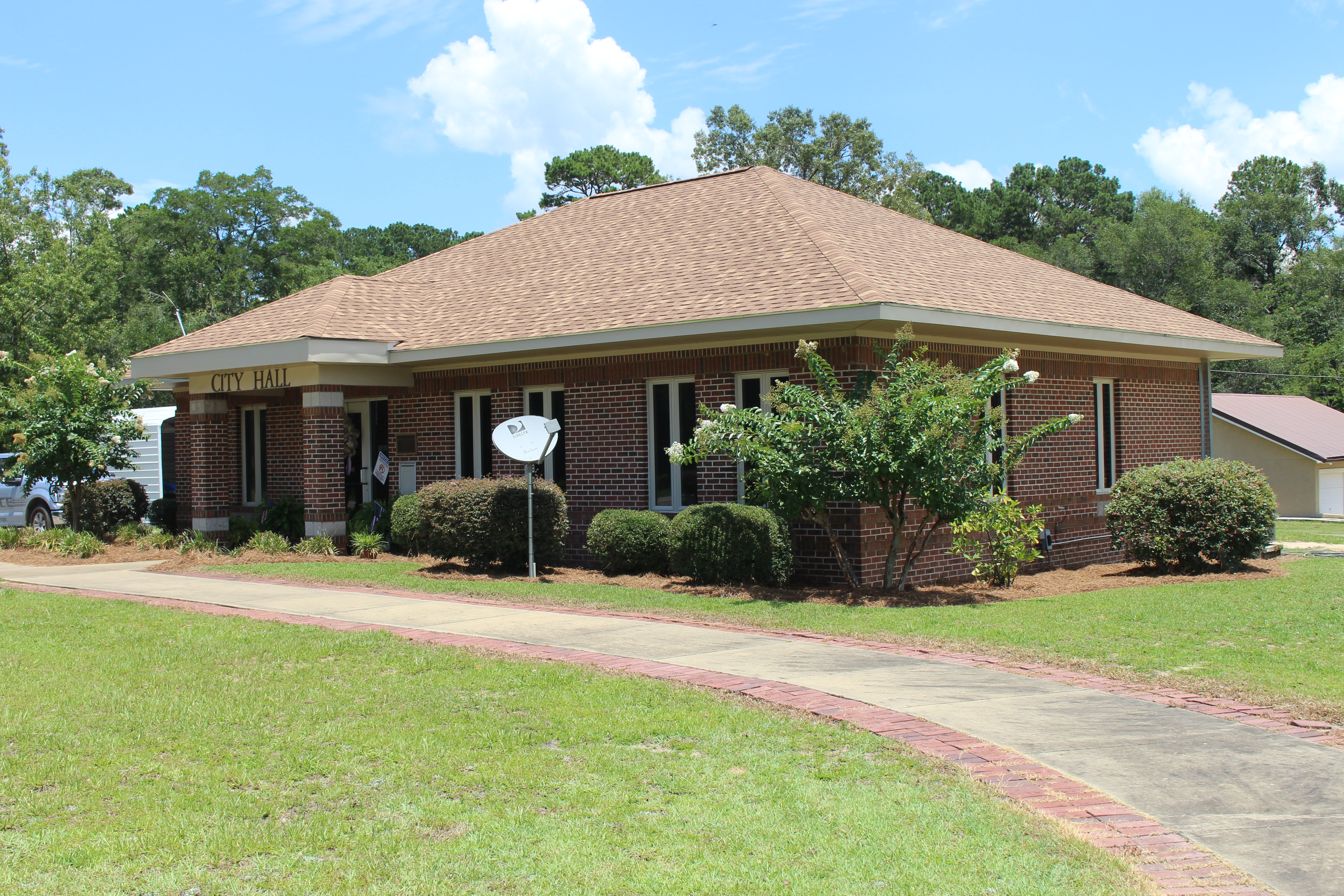
- Newton City Hall

- Location in Baker County and the state of Georgia
- Coordinates: 31°19′0″N 84°20′22″W
- Country: United States
- State: Georgia
- County: Baker

Area
  - Total: 2.28 sq mi (5.91 km^{2})
  - Land: 2.18 sq mi (5.65 km^{2})
  - Water: 0.10 sq mi (0.26 km^{2})
- Elevation: 141 ft (43 m)

Population (2020)
  - Total: 602
  - Density: 276.1/sq mi (106.62/km^{2})
- Time zone: UTC-5 (Eastern (EST))
  - Summer (DST): UTC-4 (EDT)
- ZIP codes: 39870
- Area code: 229
- FIPS code: 13-55244
- GNIS feature ID: 0332502
- Website: https://www.cityofnewtonga.com/

Newton is a city in Baker County, Georgia, United States. As of the 2020 census, the city population was 602. The city is the county seat of Baker County.

== History ==
Newton was founded in 1837. That same year, the seat of Baker County was transferred to Newton from Byron. There are several properties in Newton listed on the National Register of Historic Places: Baker County Courthouse (Georgia), Notchaway Baptist Church and Cemetery, and Pine Bloom Plantation.

== Geography ==
Newton is located at 31°19′0″N 84°20′22″W (31.316804, -84.339549). According to the United States Census Bureau, the city has a total area of 3.0 square miles (7.8 km^{2}), of which 2.9 square miles (7.5 km^{2}) is land and 0.12 square miles (0.3 km^{2}), or 3.50%, is water.

== Demographics ==
Historical population
Census	Pop.	Note	%±
1860	3,225		—
1870	145		−95.5%
1880	167		15.2%
1900	329		—
1910	364		10.6%
1920	377		3.6%
1930	517		37.1%
1940	514		−0.6%
1950	503		−2.1%
1960	529		5.2%
1970	624		18.0%
1980	711		13.9%
1990	703		−1.1%
2000	851		21.1%
2010	654		−23.1%
2020	602		−8.0%
U.S. Decennial Census; 1850-1870 1870-1880; 1890-1910 1920-1930; 1940 1950 1960; 1970 1980 1990; 2000 2020

=== Racial and ethnic composition ===
Newton city, Georgia – Racial and ethnic composition Note: the US Census treats Hispanic/Latino as an ethnic category. This table excludes Latinos from the racial categories and assigns them to a separate category. Hispanics/Latinos may be of any race.
Race / Ethnicity (NH = Non-Hispanic)	Pop 2000	Pop 2010	Pop 2020	% 2000	% 2010	% 2020
White alone (NH)	363	262	284	42.66%	40.06%	47.18%
Black or African American alone (NH)	456	336	267	53.58%	51.38%	44.35%
Native American or Alaska Native alone (NH)	1	2	0	0.12%	0.31%	0.00%
Asian alone (NH)	0	0	8	0.00%	0.00%	1.33%
Native Hawaiian or Pacific Islander alone (NH)	0	0	0	0.00%	0.00%	0.00%
Other race alone (NH)	2	0	1	0.24%	0.00%	0.17%
Mixed race or Multiracial (NH)	12	7	10	1.41%	1.07%	1.66%
Hispanic or Latino (any race)	17	47	32	2.00%	7.19%	5.32%
Total	851	654	602	100.00%	100.00%	100.00%

=== 2000 census ===
According to the census of 2000, there were 851 people, 320 households, and 228 families residing in the city. The population density was 292.7 inhabitants per square mile (113.0/km^{2}). There were 346 housing units at an average density of 119.0 units per square mile (45.9 units/km^{2}). The racial makeup of the city was 43.60% White, 53.94% African American, 0.12% Native American, 0.94% from other races, and 1.41% from two or more races. Hispanic or Latino people of any race were 2.00% of the population. By 2020, its population declined to 602.

== Education ==
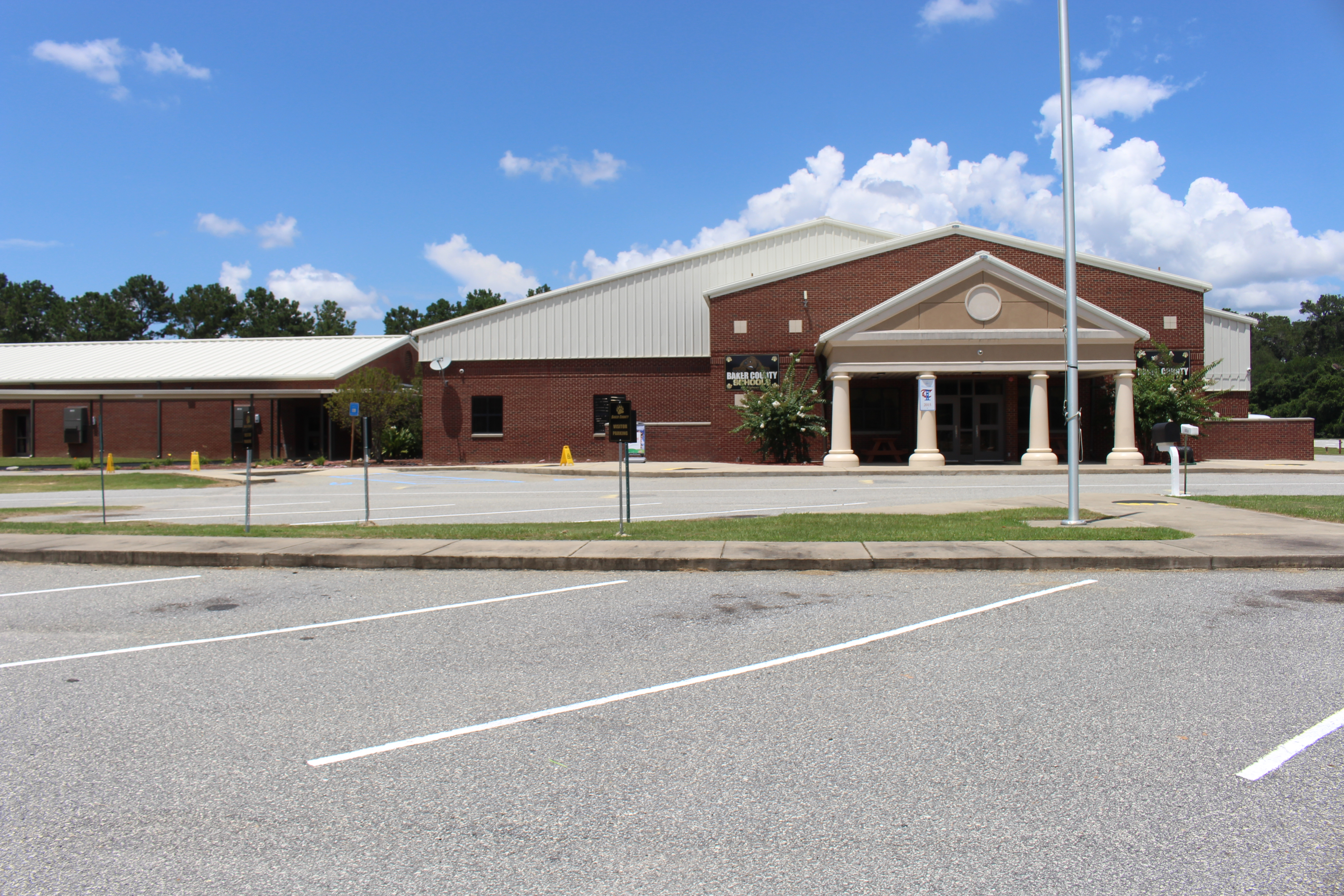
Baker County School System school building

There is one K-12 school building for the Baker County School System. It is located on State Route 37 and was named Baker County Elementary/Middle School in 2001. The building includes Baker County High School. The old school building that housed the students near the courthouse was built in the late 1960s and named East Baker School. It served the local black population during segregation, and now houses the East Baker Historical Society and 21st Century Community Corporation. The high school was returned to Newton for the 2007–2008 school year. From 1980 to 2007, the high school students traveled from Newton to Camilla for high school, formerly Mitchell-Baker High School. The old building is now used for the Baker County Headstart Center. The new gym for Baker County Schools was expected to be completed in 2009.

== Gallery ==
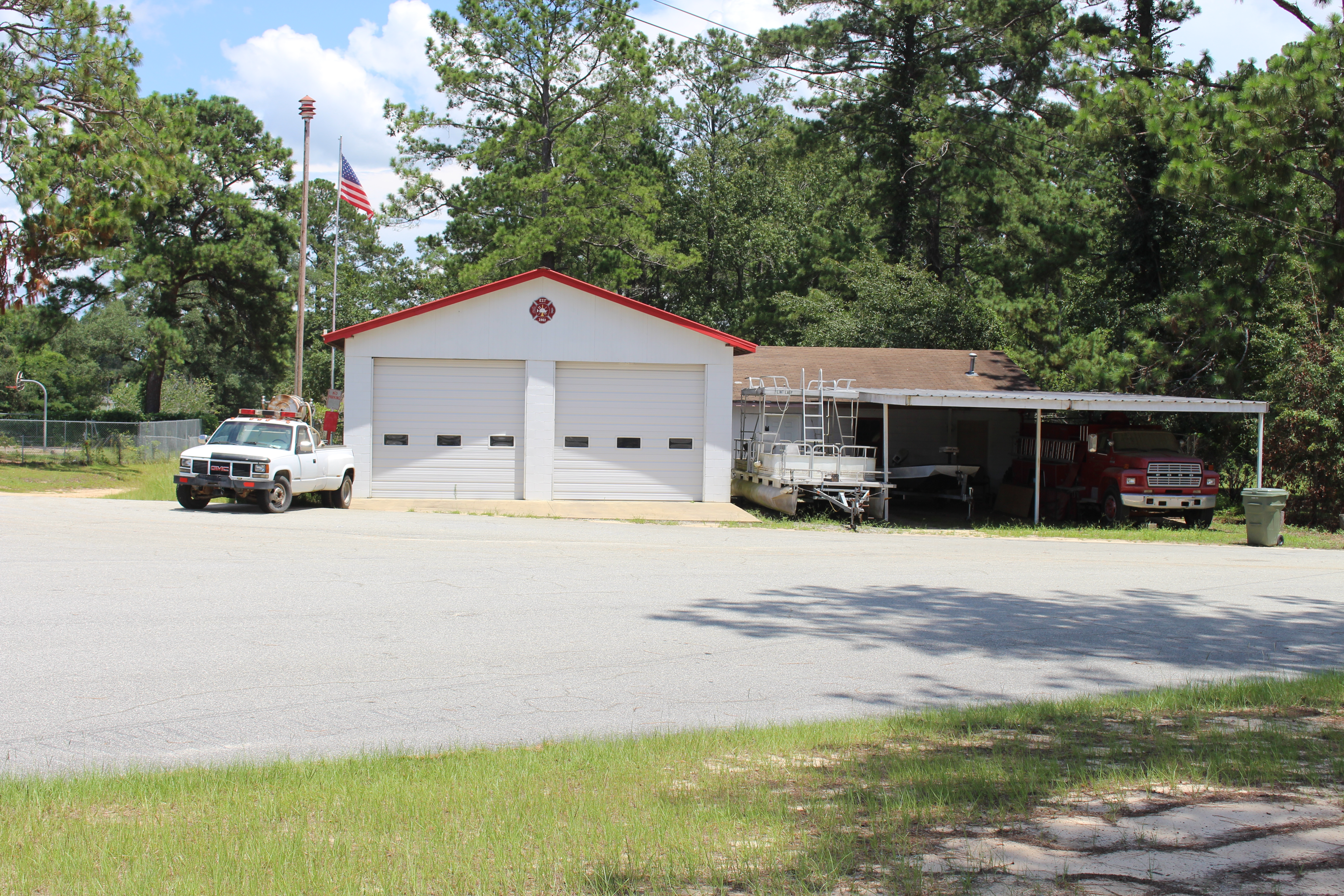
Newton Fire Department

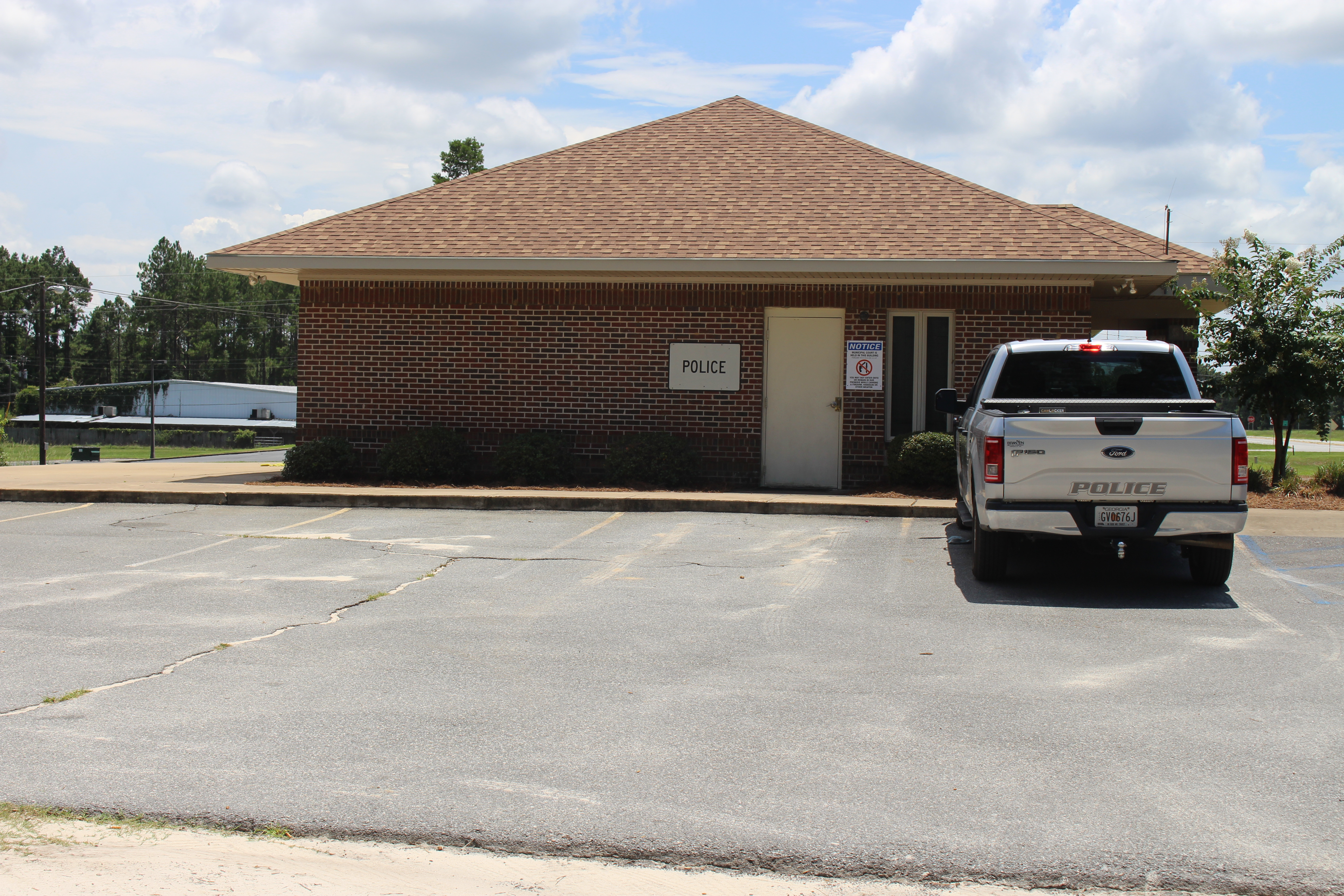
Police station

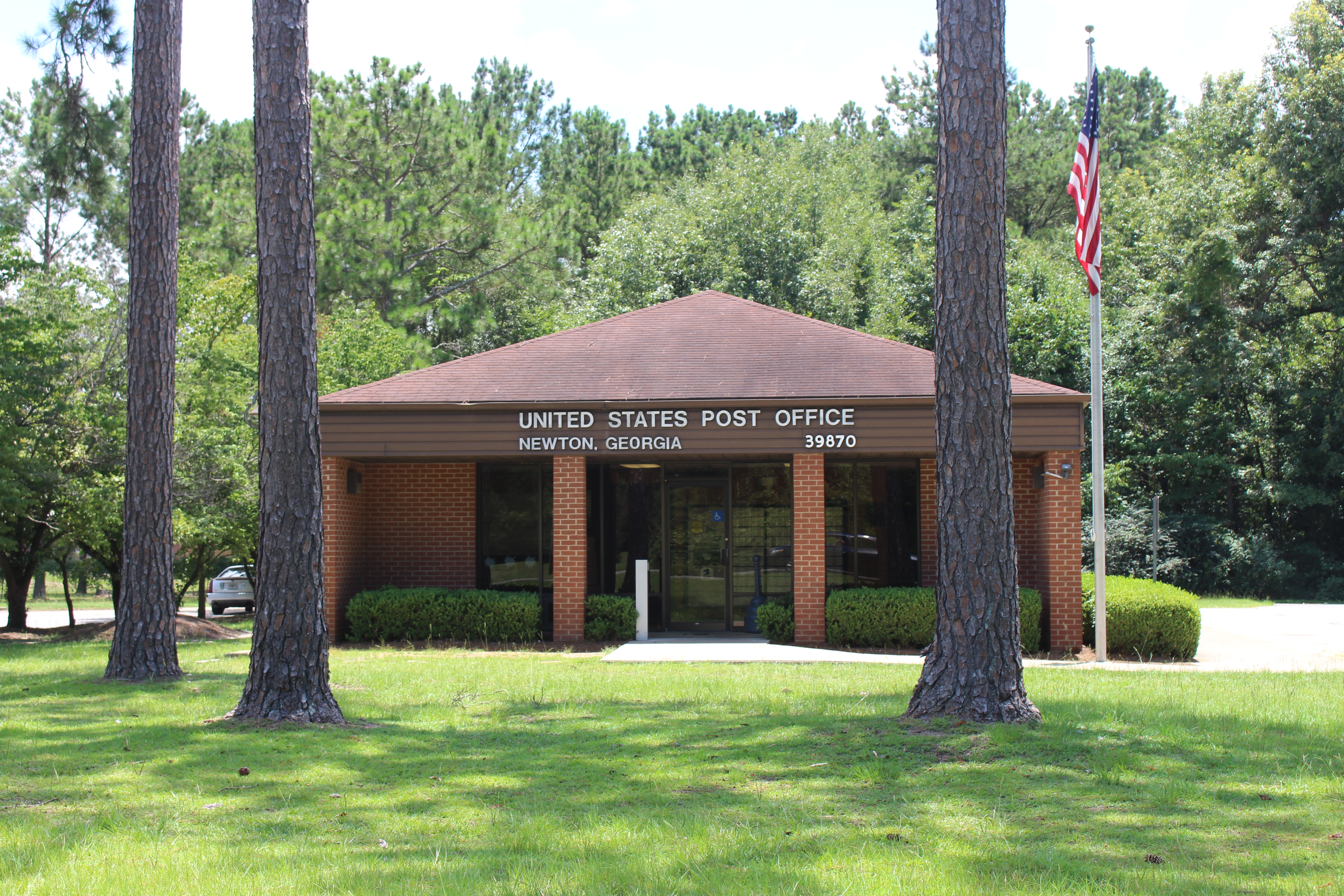
Post office
