= List of ghost towns in Georgia (U.S. state) =

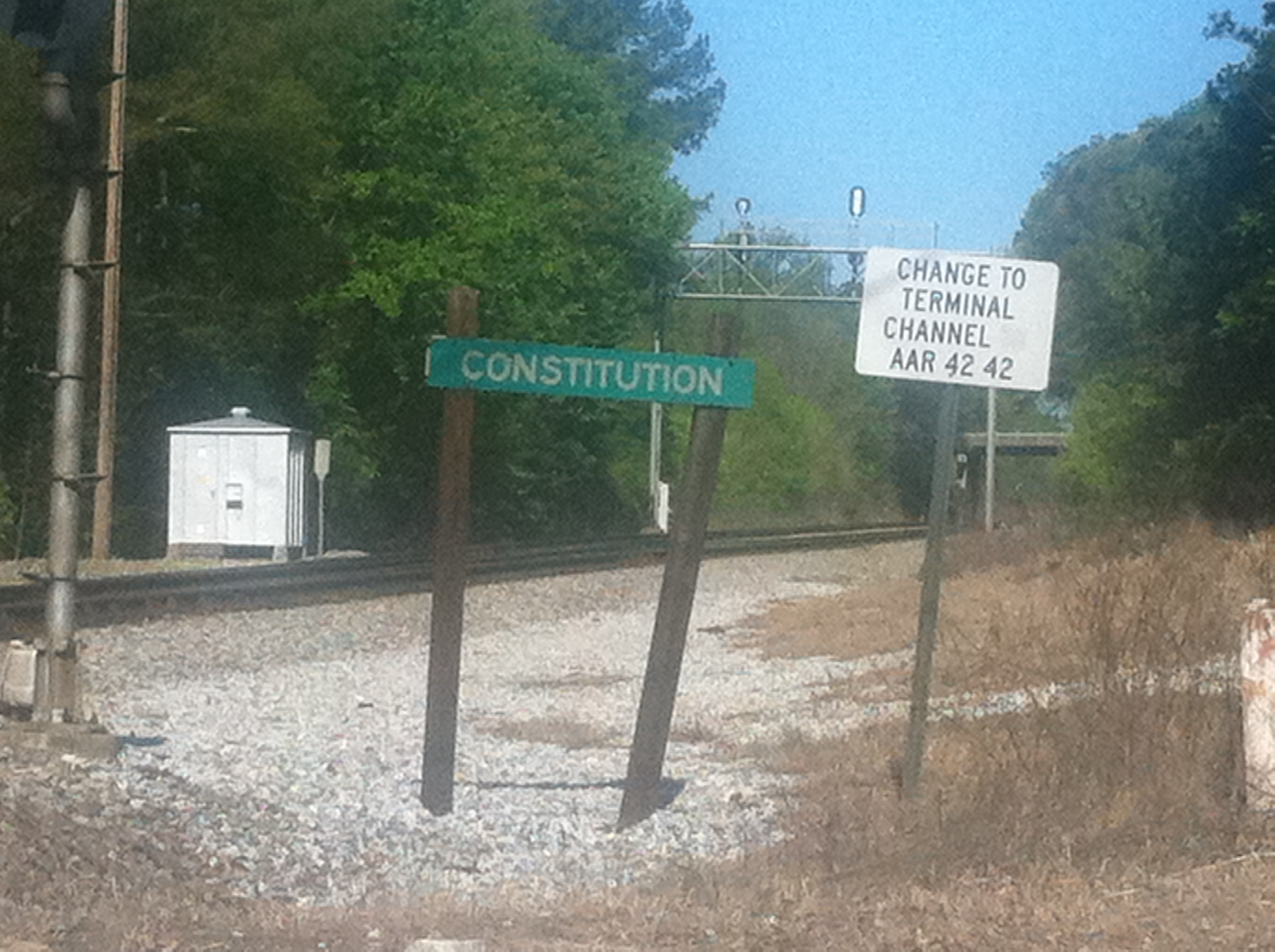
Railroad sign for Constitution, in Dekalb County, which was absorbed into Atlanta

The following is an incomplete list of ghost towns in Georgia. Ghost towns can include sites in various states of disrepair and abandonment. Some sites no longer have any trace of civilization and have reverted to pasture land or empty fields. Other sites are unpopulated but still have standing buildings. Some sites may even have a sizable, though small population, but there are far fewer citizens than in its grander historic past.

== Classification ==
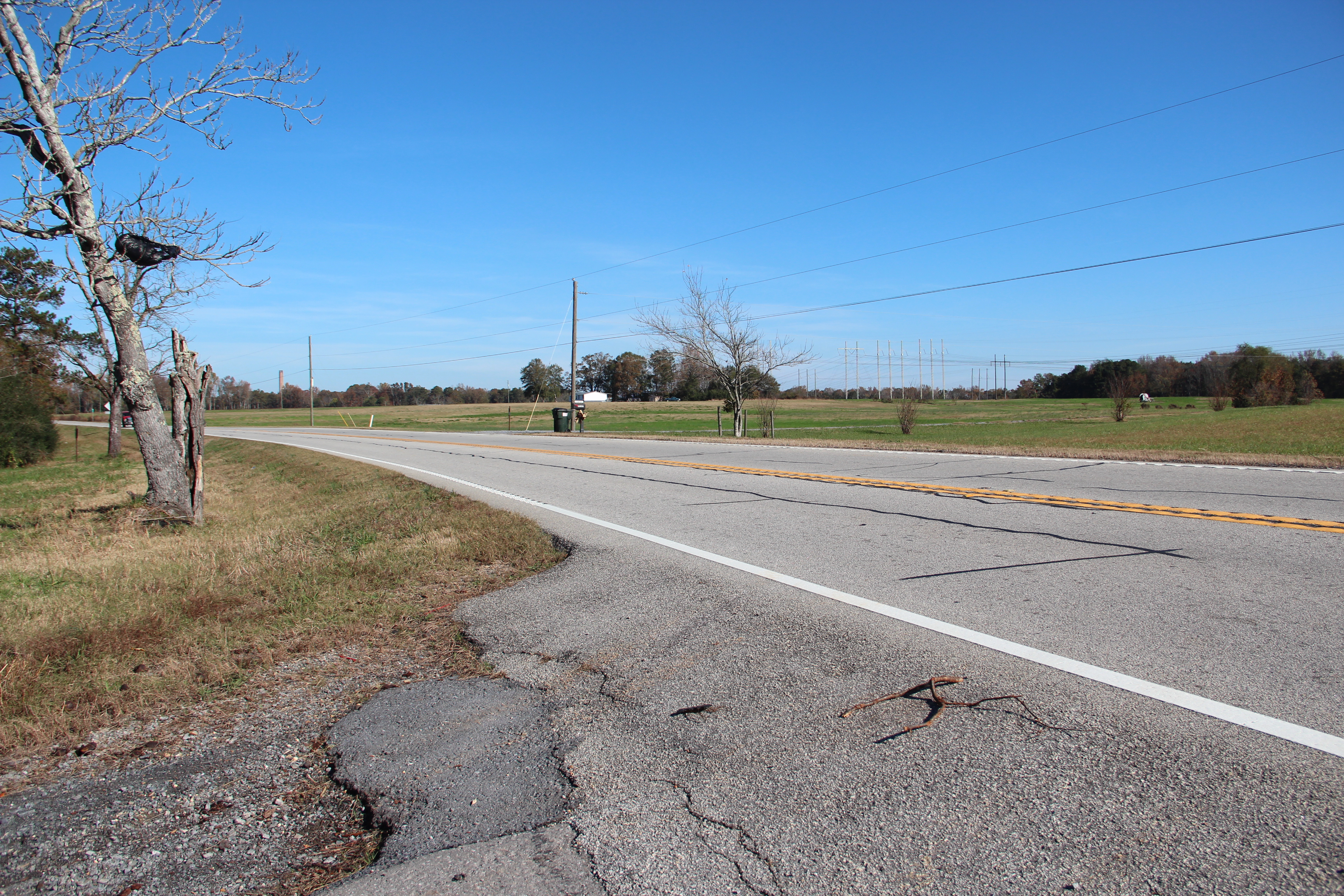
Street in Livingston

=== Barren site ===
- Sites no longer in existence
- Sites that have been destroyed
- Covered with water
- Reverted to pasture
- May have a few difficult to find foundations/footings at most

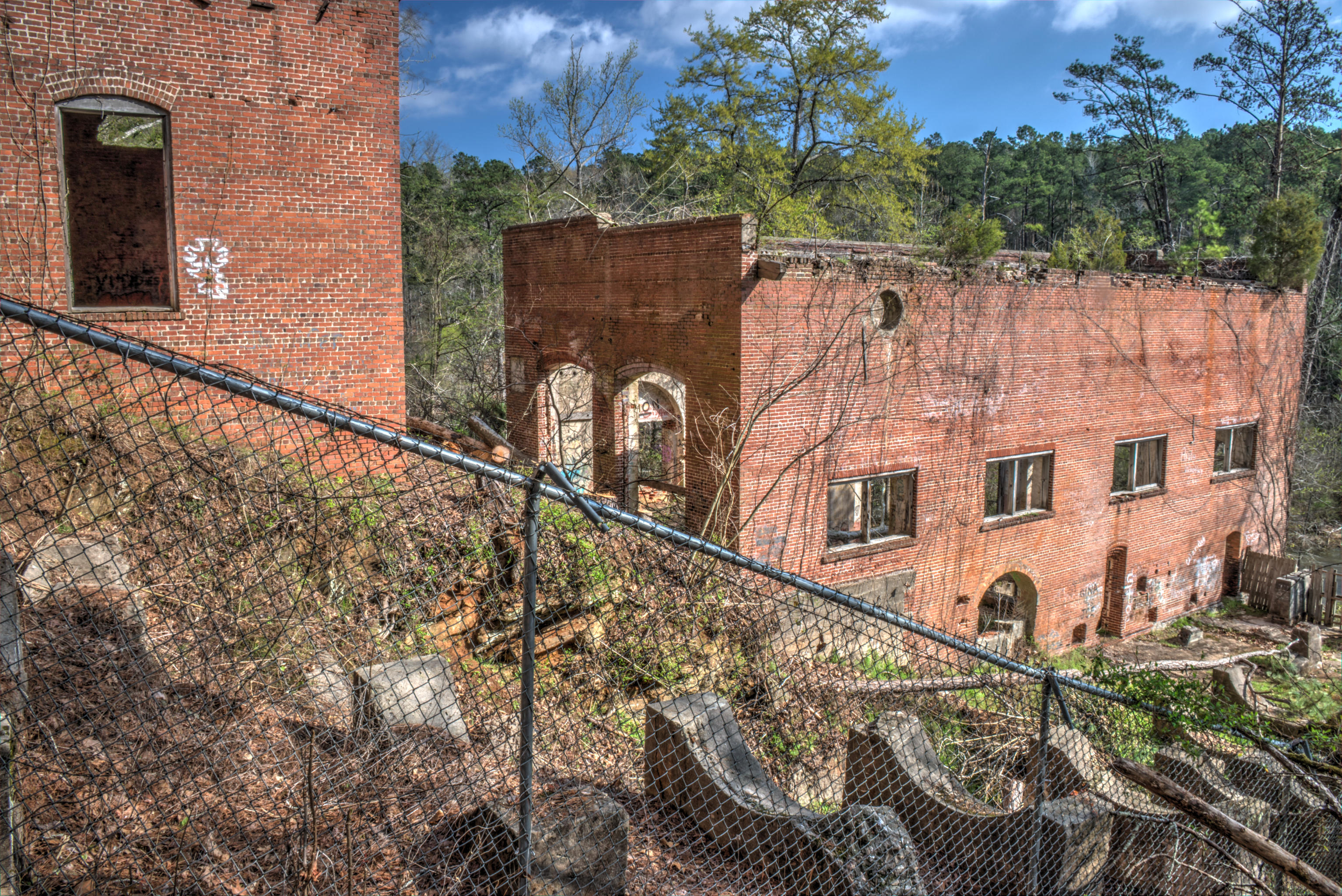
Old powerhouse in High Falls

=== Neglected site ===
- Only rubble left
- Roofless building ruins
- Buildings or houses still standing, but majority are roofless

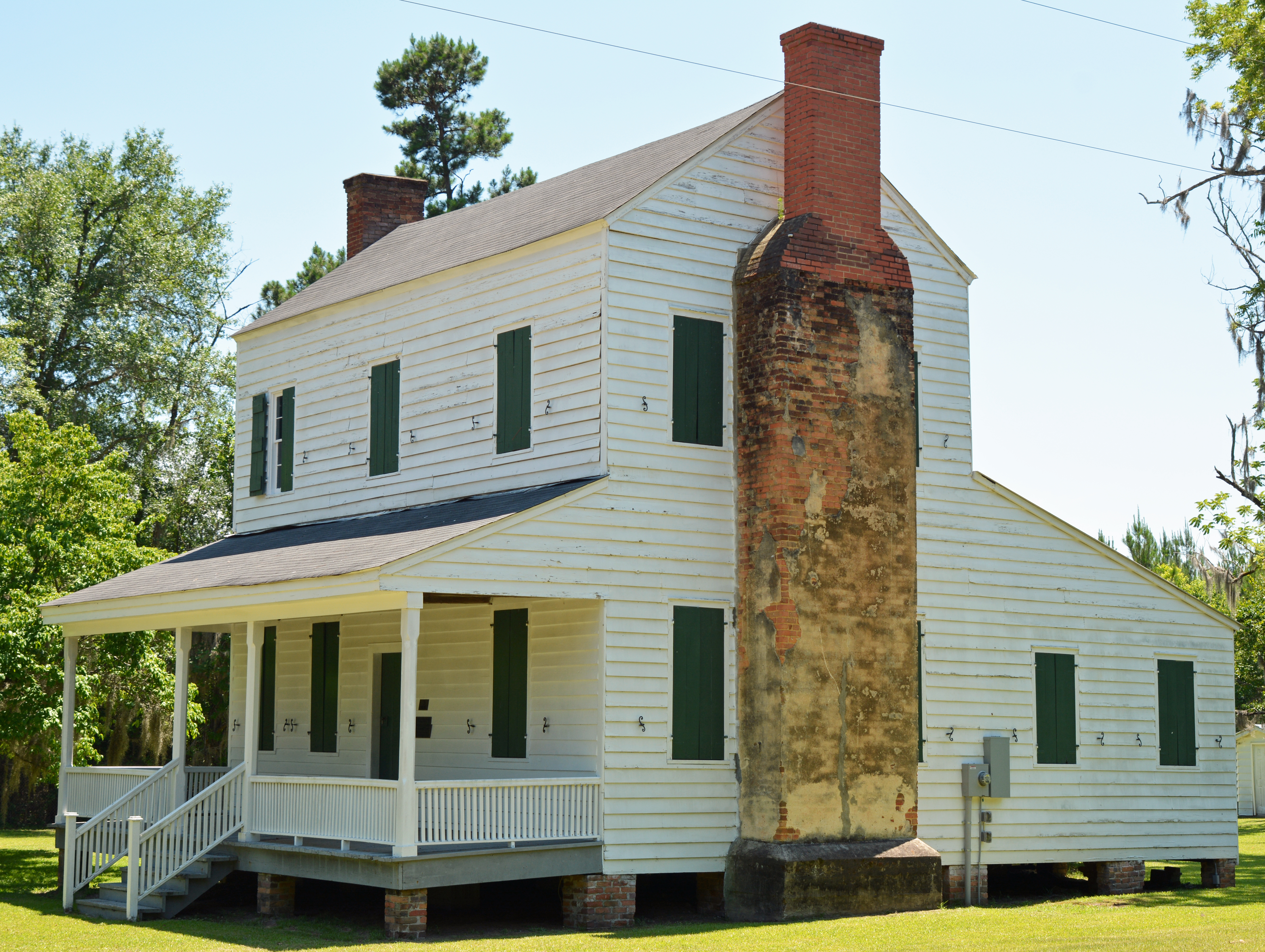
Historic Seaborn Goodall House, all that remains in Jacksonboro

=== Abandoned site ===
- Building or houses still standing
- Buildings and houses all abandoned
- No population, except caretaker
- Site no longer in existence except for one or two buildings, for example old church, grocery store

=== Semi abandoned site ===
- Building or houses still standing
- Buildings and houses largely abandoned
- Few residents
- Many abandoned buildings
- Small population
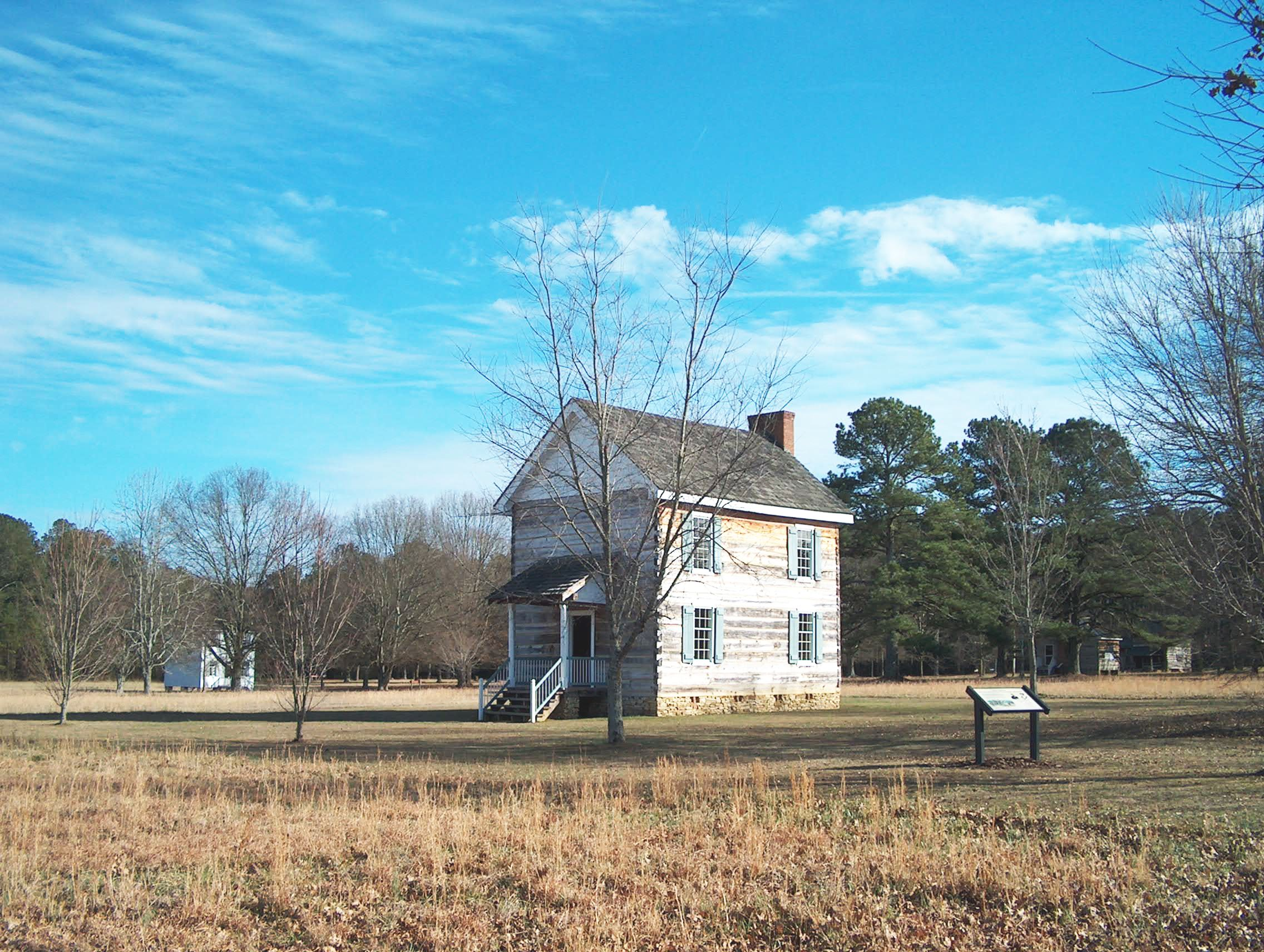
  New Echota has been preserved as a museum

=== Historic community ===
- Building or houses still standing
- Still a busy community
- Smaller than its boom years
- Population has decreased dramatically, to one fifth or less.

== List ==
Name	County	Other names	Location	Settled	Abandoned	Current status	Remarks
Agnes	Lincoln			1889	1955		A small Hamlet located away from waterways or railroads.
Allatoona	Bartow		Lake Allatoona	1838	1949	Submerged	Flooded in the mid-1940s to create Lake Allatoona, today a recreational spot. In the 1980s, low water levels allowed remnants of the town to be visible from the water.
Allon	Crawford			early 1800s			An industry town for the Atlanta Sand & Supply Company.
Apalachee	Morgan	Florence		1889	1995	Abandoned	One of the earliest settlements in Morgan County.
Apollo	Putnam						appeared on maps as late as 1955.
Argo	Fannin						
Armstrong	Wilkes						
Auraria	Lumpkin	Dean, Deans, Nuckollsville, Scuffle Town					settled during the Georgia Gold Rush but declined after the California Gold Rush and Colorado Gold Rush.
Barnett Shoals	Oconee				1995		a mill town dissolved in 1995.
Beech Hill	Wilkinson						
Belle Vista	Glynn						
Bender	Laurens						
Bethany	Baker					Neglected	Contains the collapsing remains of many buildings and stores.
Bingham	Jeff Davis						
Birdford	Tattnall						
Bladen	Glynn						
Blountsville	Jones						heavily damaged by the Civil War and never recovered.
Brasstown	Towns						former Cherokee village.
Broomtown	Chattooga						
Burnt Fort	Camden						
Burton	Rabun				1919	Submerged	flooded to create Lake Burton in 1919.
Ceylon	Camden						
Cement	Bartow		2 miles north of Kingston			Abandoned	
Centerville	Charlton						
Cheevertown	Baker			1882			
Christopher	Chattahoochee						
Cole City	Dade	Cole			1995		a settlement founded near the mouth of the Dade Coal Company coal mine.
Colerain	Camden						
Conasauga	Gilmer						a Cherokee settlement that was overtaken by European-Americans and later abandoned for larger towns.
Constitution	DeKalb				1952	Absorbed	absorbed into Atlanta in 1952.
Corinth	Sumter		12 miles east of Americus				
Clyde	Bryan						Formerly the county seat of Bryan County.
Dewsville	Baker						
Doctortown	Wayne						
Due	Fannin						
Ebenezer	Effingham					Semi-abandoned	Today, the Jerusalem Lutheran Church is the only building in use.
Eelbeck	Chattahoochee						An old Cherokee settlement
Etowah	Floyd						
Fairview	Chattooga						
Floydtown	Miller						
Ford	Bartow						
Fowlstown	Decatur						settled and abandoned twice.
Franklinville	Lowndes						
Gaillard	Crawford				1951		A railroad community that died after the closure of the rail line.
Gerber	Walker						
Grantville	Greene						
Greenbush	Walker						
Grisworldville	Jones						Largely destroyed in 1864 during the American Civil War.
High Falls	Monroe						High Falls State Park contains the abandoned industrial town of High Falls.
Huguenot	Elbert						
Hardwicke	Bryan			1754			
Jacksonboro	Screven					Abandoned/historic	Houses the historic Seaborn Goodall House.
Jamestown	Chattahoochee						
Johntown	Dawson						
Josselyn	Liberty	Josselin, Joselin	W of Riceboro(ugh), NE of Walthourville, SW of McIntosh (ghost town, not county)				shown on 1893 Woods Bros. map
Kite	Johnson					Abandoned, Decaying Buildings & Houses/Very Low Population Dying Off	
Knoxville	Crawford					Semi-abandoned	Population decreased as the railroads extended.
Lang	Carroll						
Laingkat	Decatur	Land Cat					
Ligon	Bartow						
Livingston	Floyd						
Mimsville	Baker			ca. 1880	1914		
McIntosh	Liberty						was a railroad stop. Not to be confused with neighboring McIntosh County
New Bridge	Lumpkin						
New Echota	Gordon				1830s	Historic	The capital city of the Cherokee Nation until their forced removal in the 1830s.
New Savannah	Augusta-Richmond			ca. 1740			A former Chickasaw settlement which became a tobacco town, waning with the tobacco industry in the early 19th century.
Oketeyeconne	Clay					Submerged	A former unincorporated town along the Chattahoochee River that was flooded to create Walter F. George Lake.
Olympia	Lowndes						
Oscarville	Forsyth				1912	Submerged	Flooded during the formation of Lake Lanier. In 1912, it was the site of a lynching which prompted the removal of all black residents.
Owensbyville	Heard						
Petersburg	Elbert						a tobacco town that was the third largest city in Georgia between 1800 and 1810.
Recovery	Decatur						
Roanoke	Stewart				1836		Raided by Creek Indians in 1836 and never rebuilt.
Rollo	Crawford			early 1800s			An industry town for the Atlanta Sand & Supply Company.
San Barnard	Worth						the county seat in the 1850s.
Scull Shoals	Greene						Originally settled in the early 19th century to use the rapids to power watermills. By the 1880s, erosion upstream had halted this industry.
Shackelton	Chattooga			1909	1920s		Mining community formed in 1909 and abandoned after the mines closed in the 1920s.
Socrates	Monroe						
Starkville	Lee				1995		A cemetery remains at the site.
Sunbury	Liberty				1864		lost much of its population to natural disaster and trading competition by the mid 19th century. In 1864, the remaining town was destroyed during Sherman's March to the Sea.
Sweden	Pickens						
Tarver	Echols						
Tatum	Dade						
Taylors Creek	Liberty				1940s	Evicted	evacuated in the 1940s to make room for a military installation.
Thalmann	Glynn						In 1979, a train stop in Thalmann was rerouted through Jesup, causing the community to decline.
Trader's Hill	Charlton						The first county seat in Charlton County.
Treat	Haralson (located partially in Polk County)						
Troupville	Lowndes				c. 1900		largely abandoned by the end of the 19th century, after railroad traffic in nearby Valdosta drew away most of the town's residents.
Visage	Towns						
Walnut	Lumpkin						
Warsaw	McIntosh						
Westlake	Twiggs						
Willie	Liberty				1940s	Evicted	evacuated in the 1940s to make room for a military installation.
Wisdoms Store	Harris						
Woodstown	Henry						
Wynns Mill	Henry						
Youngcane	Union						
Zirkle	Pierce				1926		Died out following the closure of the sawmill in 1926.

== See also ==
- List of counties in Georgia
- National Register of Historic Places listings in Georgia
