= Greenbush =

Greenbush or Green Bush may refer to:

== Places ==
=== Canada ===
- Greenbush, Ontario

=== United States ===
- Greenbush, Georgia
- Greenbush, Illinois
- Greenbush, Kansas
- Greenbush, Maine
- Greenbush, Massachusetts
  - Greenbush Line, a branch of the MBTA Commuter Rail system in Massachusetts
  - Greenbush (MBTA station)
- Greenbush, Michigan
- Greenbush, Minnesota
- Greenbush, Brown County, Ohio
- Greenbush, Preble County, Ohio
- Greenbush, Virginia
- Greenbush, Wisconsin, a town
- Greenbush (community), Wisconsin, an unincorporated community
- Greenbush Branch, a stream in Georgia
- East Greenbush, New York
- North Greenbush, New York
- Rensselaer, New York, formerly known as Greenbush

== People ==
- Billy Green Bush (born 1935), sometimes credited as Billy Greenbush, an American actor
- Lindsay and Sidney Greenbush (born 1970), twins who played Carrie Ingalls on the Little House on the Prairie television series

== Other uses ==
- Green Bush, a programme on the Aboriginal Australian radio station run by Central Australian Aboriginal Media Association in Alice Springs in the 1980s
- Green Bush (2005), an Australian short film directed by Warwick Thornton

== See also ==
- Green Bush Squirrel (Paraxerus poensis)
- "Green Bushes", an English folk song
- Greenbush Township (disambiguation)
