= Sam Barnard =

Sam Barnard may refer to:

- Sam Barnard (actor) (born 1985), British actor
- Sam Barnard (jockey) (c. 1776–1846), British jockey

== See also ==
- Sam Bernard (1863–1927), English-born American vaudeville performer
- Sam Bernardo (born 1992), Filipino television personality
- Samuel Bernard (disambiguation)
- San Barnard, Georgia, US
