= Sarindar Dhaliwal =

Indian-Canadian artist

- Born: Sarindar Dhaliwal; 1953 (age 72–73); Punjab, India
- Education: Falmouth School of Art; York University; Queen's University

Sarindar Dhaliwal (born 1953) is a multi-media artist, born in India, raised in England, and based in Toronto.

== Biography ==
Dhaliwal was born in Punjab, and moved with her family to England at the age of four and grew up in Southall, London. At the age of fifteen, she migrated again with her family to Canada. She settled down on a farm near Brampton, Ontario. Finding it challenging to adapt to small-town life, she worked to save up for a trip back to London, where she stayed for a year.

She received a BFA with a concentration in sculpture at Falmouth University, Cornwall in England (1978), then moved back to Canada where she still lives. She gained a MFA from York University, Toronto in 2003. Subsequently, she earned a Ph.D in Cultural Studies from Queen's University in Kingston, Ontario.

Dhaliwal's art

Dhaliwal's work is narrative-based, exploring issues of cultural identity, and includes installation, printmaking, collage, painting, and video projection. Much of Dhaliwal's work deals with memory – specifically childhood memories. Dhaliwal's art tells the story of her life as a global citizen by cleverly exploring the complex relationships between memory and place, language and colour, sport and ritual, family and society, and the histories of colonialism and migration focusing on racism, conflict, and identity. Consequently, Dhaliwal's art is simultaneously personal and universal, defying all attempts at categorization.

the green fairy story book (bookwork with table, 2010) is influenced by Dhaliwal's love of colour which she developed in childhood from reading fairy stories in colourful books at the library. Southall:Childplay (chromira print, 2009) covers an entire wall with her own collection of coloured pencils, which she used to play with. In When I grow up I want to be a namer of paint colors (mixed media on graph paper, 2010), Dhaliwal gives names to colours: crushed raspberry, Indian summer, burnt persimmon. Dhaliwal's love of colour is also evident in the glowing colours of 28 ambassador cars (chromira print, 2010) driving around an island of text.

It was Dhaliwal's own lived experience of racism that nurtured her love of colour. However, all colors are equal for her. In Corner Flags and Corner Shops (mixed media installation, 2013) depicting a racist incidence even on the soccer field, she paints in multicoloured butterflies on white paper, to point out that colours are natural and racism is not a part of nature.

Dhaliwal's videowork olive, almond and mustard (2010) depicts her childhood memory of growing up in Britain having her long black hair washed with white yoghurt and oiled and braided by her mother. This piece moves back and forth from India to Britain with nursery rhymes, Bollywood film music, English pop songs and BBC Radio news describing her immigrant childhood in Great Britain.

The cartographer's mistake: the Radcliffe Line (chromira print, 2012) depicts the partition of the Indian subcontinent in Marigold flowers. Marigolds are traditionally a symbol of welcome but here they set the country afire. In 1947, Cyril Radcliffe was charged with carving up the subcontinent into 2 countries on the basis of religion: India and Pakistan. Even today, people are still writing and talking about the nightmare of partition.

== Exhibitions ==
Dhaliwal's work has been exhibited around Canada since the 1980s. Dhaliwal has exhibited her work at many major Canadian public galleries, including The Edmonton Art Gallery and the Agnes Etherington Art Centre, Ontario. She is represented in the Centre for Contemporary Canadian Art. An exhibition of her work, 'Record Keeping', toured Britain in 2004, showing at the John Hansard Gallery (Southampton), Oriel Mostyn Gallery (Wales)and at Canada House Gallery (London). Her work is in collections including Canada Council Art Bank and the Walter Phillips Gallery at The Banff Centre for the Arts.

Dhaliwal's most recent solo shows were in 2013 at A Space Gallery, an artist-led space in Toronto and at the Surrey Art Gallery in Surrey, British Columbia; Gallerie Deste in Montreal (2010) and the Robert Langen Art Gallery in Waterloo (2012). In 2011, she participated in exhibitions in Stony Plain, Alberta, the Art Gallery of Greater Victoria and the Reach, Abbotsford both in British Columbia and at the Vadehra Art Gallery in Delhi, India. Sarindar Dhaliwal was the 2012 recipient of the Canada Council International Residency at Artspace, Sydney, Australia.

In November 2016, Dhaliwal's work was featured as part of the Koffler Art Gallery's exhibit Yonder. This exhibition dealt with work surrounding the Canadian immigrant experience.

In 2023, Dhaliwal had a solo retrospective, When I grow up I want to be a namer of paint colours, at the Art Gallery of Ontario.

=== List of solo exhibitions ===
- 1983 – Images de St. Pierre et Michelon, Le Centre Français, Kingston, Ontario
- 1984 – Des fruits et des triangles, Le Chambre Blance, Quebec City, Quebec
- 1985 – Recent Works, Kingston Public Library, Kingston, Ontario
- 1987 – St. Lawrence College Gallery, Kingston, Ontario
- 1989 – Laurentian University Museum and Arts Centre, Sudbury, Ontario
- 1989 – Art Noise, Kingston, Ontario
- 2004–2005 – Record Keeping, organized and circulated by the Organization for Visual Arts and Agnes Etherington Art Centre, touring to John Hansard Gallery, Southampton UK, Oriel Mostyn Gallery (now MOSTYN), Llandudno Wales, Canada House Gallery, London, UK, and Agnes Etherington Art Centre, Kingston, Ontario
- 2012 – the Cartographer's mistake: Hockey Fields and Marigold Maps, Robert Langen Art Gallery, Waterloo, Ontario
- 2013 – the cartographer's mistake: Southall and other places, A Space Gallery, Toronto, Ontario
- 2013 – Sarindar Dhaliwal: Narratives from the Beyond, Surrey Art Gallery, Surrey, British Columbia
- 2015–2016 - The Radcliffe Line and Other Geographies, Organized and Circulated by Rodman Hall Art Centre/Brock University, touring also to The Reach Gallery Museum, Abbotsford, British Columbia, Canada, and Robert McLaughlin Gallery, Oshawa, Ontario, Canada.
- 2023 – When I grow up I want to be a namer of paint colours, Art Gallery of Ontario, Toronto ON

=== List of selected group exhibitions ===
- 1985 – Artforms, Kitchener-Waterloo Gallery, Kitchener, Ontario
- 1985 – Rodnam Hall Arts Centre, St. Catharines, Ontario
- 1985 – A Change in the Weather, K.A.A.I. Gallery, Kingston, Ontario (two-person show)
- 2011–2012 – Collected Resonance: Shelly Bhal, Sarindar Dhaliwal, Farheen HaQ, Art Gallery of Greater Victoria, Victoria, British Columbia
- 2015 – Traversive Territories: Sarindar Dhaliwal, Soheila Esfahani, Colette Urban, Varley Art Gallery, Markham, Ontario
- 2016 – Yonder, Koffler Gallery, Toronto
- 2018 – India Contemporary Photographic and New Media Art, FotoFest 2018 Biennial (Asia Society Texas Center, Houston, Texas)
- 2018–2019 – Vision Exchange: Perspectives from India to Canada, organized and circulated by the National Gallery of Canada and the Art Gallery of Alberta, touring also to the Art Museum at the University of Toronto and the Winnipeg Art Gallery

== Awards ==
- 1983 – Aprons (installation), MacDonald Park, Kingston, Ontario
- 1983 – Ministry of Culture Artist in the Community Award
- 1982, 1984 – Ontario Arts Council, Artist in the Schools Programme
- 1983–1986 – Ontario Arts Council, Materials Assistance Grant
- 1987 – Canada Council, Explorations Grant
