= Visa =

Visa most commonly refers to:

- Travel visa, a document allowing entry to a foreign country
- Work visa (work permit), a document granting permission to work in a foreign country
- Visa Inc., a US multinational financial and payment cards company
  - Visa Debit card issued by the above company
  - Visa Plus, an interbank network
  - Visa Electron, a debit card

Visa or VISA may also refer to:

== People ==
- Bogdan Vișa, Romanian footballer
- Visa Hongisto, Finnish sprinter
- Viśa Īrasangä, Khotanese painter
- Visa Mäkinen, Finnish film director
- Viśa' Saṃbhava, Khotanese king
- Visa (drag queen), Mexican-Spanish drag queen

== Places ==
- Vișa, a river in Romania
- Sirsa Air Force Station (ICAO code), India
- Visa village, Jucu Commune, Cluj County, Romania

== Science and technology ==
- Vancomycin intermediate-resistant Staphylococcus aureus or vancomycin-intermediate Staphylococcus aureus, a bacterium
- Virtual instrument software architecture, an input/output API used in the test and measurement industry
- VISA (gene) (virus induced signaling adaptor)
- Visa, a fabric marketed by Milliken & Company

== Film and television ==
- Visa (film), a 1983 Malayalam film
- "The Visa", a 1993 episode of the television sitcom Seinfeld

== Music ==
- "Visa" (SB19 song), a song by Filipino boy band SB19
- Visa (album), 2014, by Vladislav Delay
- Visa, a Swedish song type within the Swedish ballad tradition
- V.I.S.A., a French record label
- "Visa", a 1980 solo by Duncan Mackay
- "Visa", a song by M.I.A. from AIM
- "Visa", a composition by Charlie Parker, which he recorded in 1949
- "Visa", a song by Tulisa from The Female Boss

== Other uses ==
- Citroën Visa, an automobile
- Vancouver Island School of Art, Canada

== See also ==
- Vis (disambiguation)
- Visage (disambiguation)
