= Cement City =

Cement City may refer to the following places in the United States:

- Cement City, Michigan
- Cement City Historic District, Donora, Pennsylvania

== See also ==
- Cement (disambiguation)#Places
