= Broomtown =

Broomtown may refer to:

- Broomtown, Alabama
- Broomtown, Georgia
