= Visage =

Visage may refer to:

- Face or facial features
- Visage Mobile, an American software as a service company
- Visage, Georgia, a community in the United States
- "Visage" (nightclub), a nightclub and live music venue formerly located in Orlando, Florida
- Visage (film), also known as Face, a 2009 French film
- Visage (video game), a survival horror game by SadSquare Studio.
- "Visage", a 2003 episode of Smallville
- Venus In Situ Atmospheric and Geochemical Explorer (VISAGE), a 2017 Venus lander proposal by NASA

== Music ==
- "Visage", a 1961 electro-acoustic work by Luciano Berio
- Visage (band), a British pop group
  - Visage (Visage album), a 1980 album by Visage
  - "Visage" (song), a 1981 song by Visage
  - Visage (EP), a 1981 compilation EP by Visage
  - Visage (video), a 1986 compilation video by Visage
- Visage (Rob Brown album), a 2000 album by jazz saxophonist Rob Brown
- "Visage", a 1968 song by Nicoletta (singer)

== People with the surname ==
- Bertrand Visage (born 1952), French writer
- Michelle Visage (born 1968), American singer and radio host
