= New Bridge =

New Bridge may refer to:

== Bridges ==
- Chester New Bridge, County Durham, England
- Most Slovenského Národného Povstania (called the Nový Most, for New Bridge, until 2012), over the Danube in Bratislava, Slovakia
- New Bridge (Dublin), over the River Dodder in Dublin, Ireland
- New Bridge, Mitrovica, a bridge completed in 2001 over the Ibar between North Mitrovica and Mitrovica, Kosovo
- Newbridge, River Dart, a bridge completed in 1413 over the River Dart in Dartmoor, England
- New Bridge, River Thames, Oxfordshire, England
- Pont Neuf (New Bridge), a bridge completed in 1607 over the Seine in Paris, France
- Puente Nuevo (New Bridge), a bridge completed in 1793 over a 120-metre (390 ft)-deep chasm in Ronda, Spain

== Other ==
- New Bridge, Georgia, United States
- New Bridge Landing, in New Jersey, United States
- New Bridge Landing (NJT station), in New Jersey, United States
- New Bridge, Newfoundland and Labrador, Canada
- New Bridge Middle School, in North Carolina, United States
- Shinbashi, Tokyo
- Saphan Mai, Bangkok

== See also ==
- Newbridge (disambiguation)
