= Newbridge =

Newbridge may refer to:

== Places ==
=== Australia ===
- Newbridge, New South Wales
- Newbridge, Victoria

=== England ===
- Newbridge, Bath, electoral ward, Somerset
- Newbridge, Cornwall, three places in Cornwall with the same name
- Newbridge, East Sussex
- Newbridge, Isle of Wight
- Newbridge, North Yorkshire
- Newbridge, Oxfordshire
- Newbridge, Wolverhampton, a suburb of Wolverhampton, West Midlands
- The Newbridge School

=== Ireland ===
- Avoca, County Wicklow, a small town, once known as Newbridge
- Newbridge, County Galway, a village
- Newbridge, County Kildare, a large town, sometimes known by its Irish name Droichead Nua

=== Northern Ireland ===
- Newbridge, County Londonderry, a townland

=== Scotland ===
- Newbridge, Edinburgh, a village to the west of Edinburgh

=== Wales ===
- Newbridge, Caerphilly (traditionally in Monmouthshire)
- Newbridge, Ceredigion
- Newbridge, Wrexham
- Newbridge-on-Wye, Powys
- Newbridge-on-Usk, Monmouthshire

== Bridges ==
- Newbridge, River Dart, bridge over the River Dart, Dartmoor in Devon
- Newbridge, River Thames, a bridge crossing of the River Thames, England

== Companies ==
- NewBridge Bank, headquartered in Greensboro, North Carolina, United States
- Newbridge Networks, a defunct computer hardware company
- Newbridge Silverware, an Irish maker of homeware etc.

== See also ==
- New Bridge (disambiguation)
