= Farheen HaQ =

South Asian Muslim Canadian multidisciplinary artist

Farheen Haq
- Born: January 14, 1977 (age 49); Niagara, Ontario
- Education: York University
- Website: www.farheenhaq.com

Farheen Haq (born 1977) is a South Asian Muslim Canadian multidisciplinary artist. Her artistic practice explores a range of topics, frequently related to identity, and culture. Haq's works often engage her community, and make use of gestures that reference spiritual and domestic rituals.

== Biographical information ==
Farheen Haq was born in 1977 in Niagara, Ontario, a region to which her mother immigrated from Pakistan during her parents' arranged marriage. Haq holds a Bachelor of Arts in International Development from the University of Toronto, completed in 1998, and a Bachelor of Education from the University of Ottawa, completed in 2000. In 2005, Haq received their Master of Fine Arts from the York University. Haq currently resides in Victoria, British Columbia on Lkwungen Territory with her husband Chris; daughter Aisha, who is a hairdresser in the city; and son Cairo, a recognized trombone player.

== Artistic works ==
Farheen Haq has exhibited across Canada and internationally. Her works have examined family ties, cultural histories, identity, and spirituality, among other themes.

Solo and Collaborative Exhibitions
Exhibition Title	Date(s)	Gallery	Location
Who Knows	2002	Gallery at the Mac	Victoria, British Columbia
Breathing Space	2004	Art Gallery of Greater Victoria	Victoria, British Columbia
Endless Tether	2004; 2007; 2008	Lennox Contemporary Gallery; Khyber Centre for the Arts; Struts Gallery	Toronto, Ontario; Halifax, Nova Scotia; Sackville, New Brunswick
Image Bar	2005	Blackwood Gallery	Mississauga, Ontario
Breach	2006	Trinity Square Video Gallery	Toronto, Ontario
Remember	Oct. 15, 2006 - Oct. 29, 2006	Ministry of Casual Living	Victoria, British Columbia
Farheen HAQ	Sept. 16, 2006 - Nov. 26, 2006	Kelowna Art Gallery	Kelowna, British Columbia
Fray	Feb. 21, 2008 - Mar. 22, 2008	Gallery TPW	Toronto, Ontario
Alone Together	2008	Niagara Artist's Company	St. Catharines, Ontario
Being Home	Sept. 18, 2015 - Nov. 6, 2015; July 15, 2016 - Aug. 27, 2016; 2016	Comox Valley Art Gallery; The Alternator Centre for Contemporary Art; Flux Media Gallery	Courtenay, British Columbia; Kelowna, British Columbia; Victoria, British Columbia
Sentirse en casa	2018	Casa Cultura Los Colores Gallery	Medellin, Colombia
The Ground Above Us (Collaboration with Charles Campbell and Yuxwelupton Qwal’qaxala (Bradley Dick))	July 26 - Sept. 14, 2019	UVic Legacy Gallery	Victoria, British Columbia
میں اپنی ماں کی بیٹی ہوں | I am my mother’s daughter	Sept. 1, 2022 - Nov. 19 2022; June 23, 2023 - Dec. 31, 2023; Jul. 6, 2024 - Mar. 8, 2025	Campbell River Art Gallery; Art Gallery of Hamilton; Reach Gallery	Campbell River, British Columbia; Hamilton, Ontario; Abbotsford, British Columbia
Collected Resonance: Shelly Bahl, Sarindar Dhaliwal, Farheen HaQ	2011	Art Gallery of Greater Victoria.	Victoria, British Columbia

== Community involvement and recognition ==
Haq has engaged with personal, local, and national communities through her art practice, and she has also received recognition for her artistic contributions.

Her artistic work, which often incorporate family and culture as themes, have sometimes included involvement from her family members. Haq's family has also been included in programming associated with her exhibitions.

She has given several free artist talks at educational institutions, including at the Vancouver Island School of Art and the University of Victoria.

In 2021, Haq appeared as an interviewee in Saida Ouchaou-Ozarowski's film In Full Voice, a National Film Board of Canada documentary about the experiences of Muslim Canadian Women.

In 2014, they were longlisted for the Sobey Art Award, the largest award for contemporary art in Canada.
