= Brightfin =

American software company

brightfin, Inc.
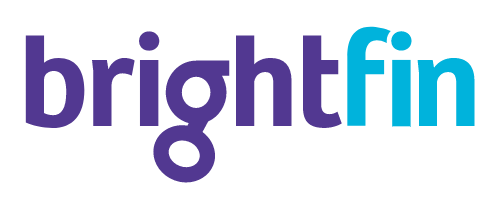
- Formerly: Visage Mobile
- Company type: Private
- Industry: Software as a service Telecom Expense Management Wireless Expense Management Enterprise Mobility Management
- Founded: 2001
- Headquarters: Sacramento, California
- Key people: Bzur Haun, CEO; Mani Zarrehparvar, President
- Products: MobilityCentral™
- Website: brightfin.com

brightfin, formerly Visage Mobile, is a software-as-a-service (SaaS) company that provides telecom expense management solutions for enterprises. Their product, MobilityCentral, is a web-based application intended to simplify enterprise mobility management. Visage MobilityCentral hosts a variety of tools including automated cost-savings recommendations, integration with AT&T Mobility and Verizon Wireless APIs, inventory management, and dynamic cost-accounting reporting. The company also provides managed services including device recycling, help desk management, break-fix, bill audit, wireless and fixed asset cost optimization, and bill pay.

== History ==
Founded in 2001 as an MVNE, Visage Mobile developed integrations with billing and Sprint network providers to enable branded mobility services. Visage Mobile was the back-end systems integrator for Mobile ESPN and Disney Mobile as well as Embarq wireless. In 2008, Visage acquired Agistics. In late 2008, Convergys purchased Visage's MVNE organization.

Visage launched MobilityCentral in 2008 and in less than a year was recognized by Network World as one of the Nine Wireless Companies to Watch and was chosen as a finalist for the AOTMP Innovation of the Year Award.

The company was acquired by Periscope Equity and merged with other acquisitions to form brightfin in 2021.
