= Cement (disambiguation) =

Cement is a material for bonding stone or brick.

Cement may also refer to:

== Materials ==
- Portland cement, the most common cement in modern use
- Adhesive or cement
- Cement (geology), in geology means the fine-grained minerals which bind the coarser-grained matrix in sedimentary rocks
- Cementum, a specialized bony substance covering the root of a tooth

== Arts and entertainment ==
- Cement (novel), a 1925 Soviet novel by Fyodor Gladkov
- Cement, Chuck Mosley's post-Faith No More band, and Cement, their debut album
- Cement (Die Kreuzen album), 1991
- Cement (film), a 2000 neo-noir film directed by Adrian Pasdar
- "Cement" (song), a 1997 single by Feeder

== Places ==
- Cement, Georgia, US
- Cement, Oklahoma, US
- Cement, California, US

== See also ==
- Cement City (disambiguation)
