= Belle Vista, Georgia =

Ghost town in Glynn County, Georgia

Coordinates: 31°21′28″N 81°44′14″W

Belle Vista is an extinct town in Glynn County in the U.S. state of Georgia.

== History ==
A post office called "Bellvista" was in operation from 1889 until 1895. "Belle Vista" translates to "beautiful view" in French.

== See also ==
- List of ghost towns in Georgia
