= Constitution, Georgia =

Ghost town in DeKalb County, Georgia

Coordinates: 33°41′20″N 84°20′33″W

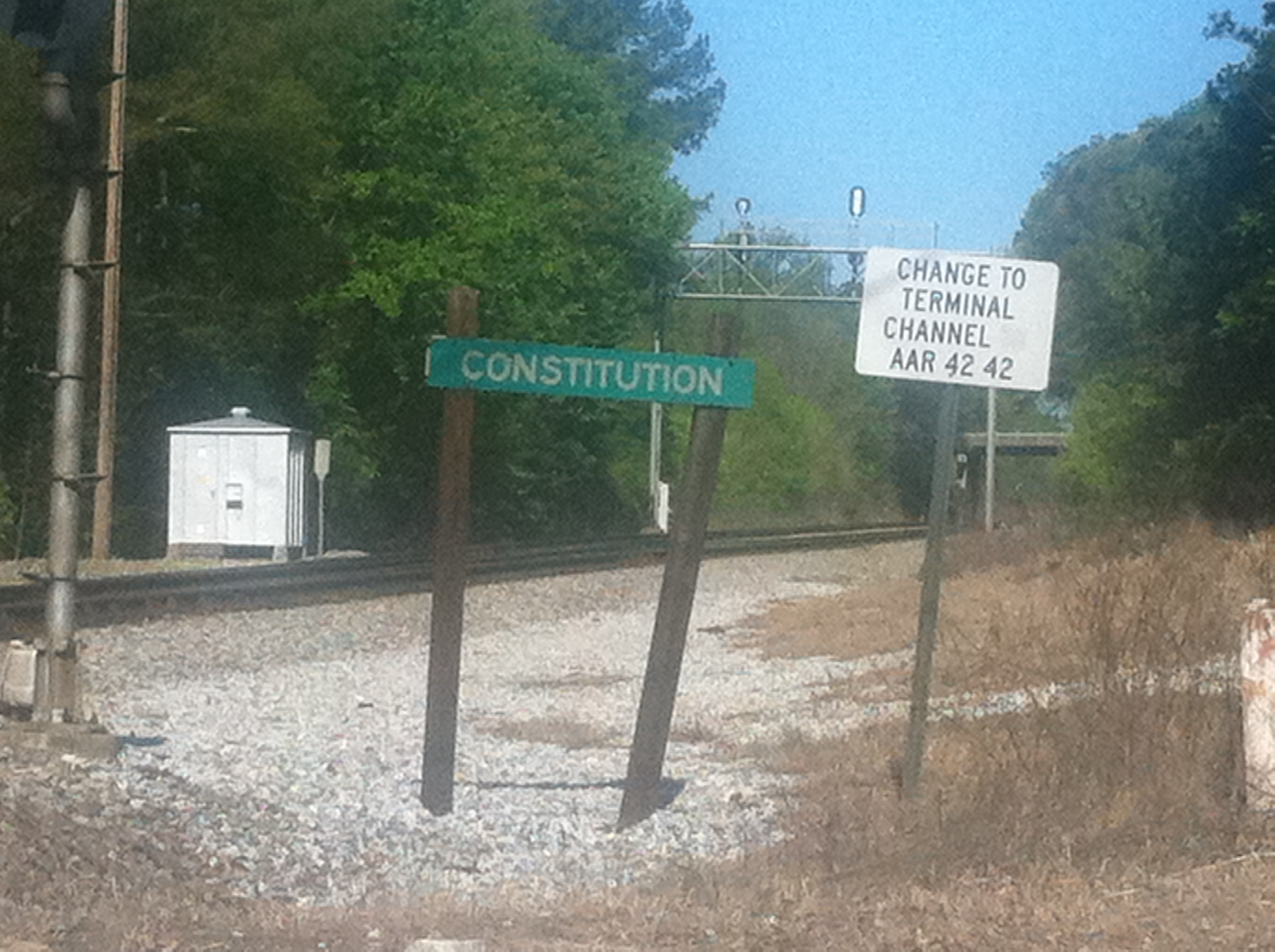
A railroad identification sign for Constitution in DeKalb County

Constitution was a pre-Civil War community south of Atlanta. A prison was located there. Currently, Metro State Prison is located near the old abandoned prison. The city had a circular city limit and half of it was in Fulton County and half of it was in DeKalb County. When Atlanta annexed the Thomasville area in 1952, it took up half of what was left of Constitution, which predated everything around it.

== See also ==
- Ghost town
- Cheevertown, Georgia
- Dewsville, Georgia
