= Greenbush Township =

Greenbush Township may refer to:

- Greenbush Township, Warren County, Illinois
- Greenbush Township, Alcona County, Michigan
- Greenbush Township, Clinton County, Michigan
- Greenbush Township, Mille Lacs County, Minnesota
- Greenbush Township, Ward County, North Dakota, in Ward County, North Dakota
