= Tatum, Georgia =

Ghost town in Dade County, Georgia

Coordinates: 34°50′17.28″N 85°30′55.87″W

Tatum is an extinct town in Dade County, in the U.S. state of Georgia.

== History ==
The community was named after Colonel Robert H. "Uncle Bob" Tatum, an early settler and afterward state legislator.

== See also ==
- List of ghost towns in Georgia
