= Towaliga River =

Coordinates: 33.12707°N 83.81713°W

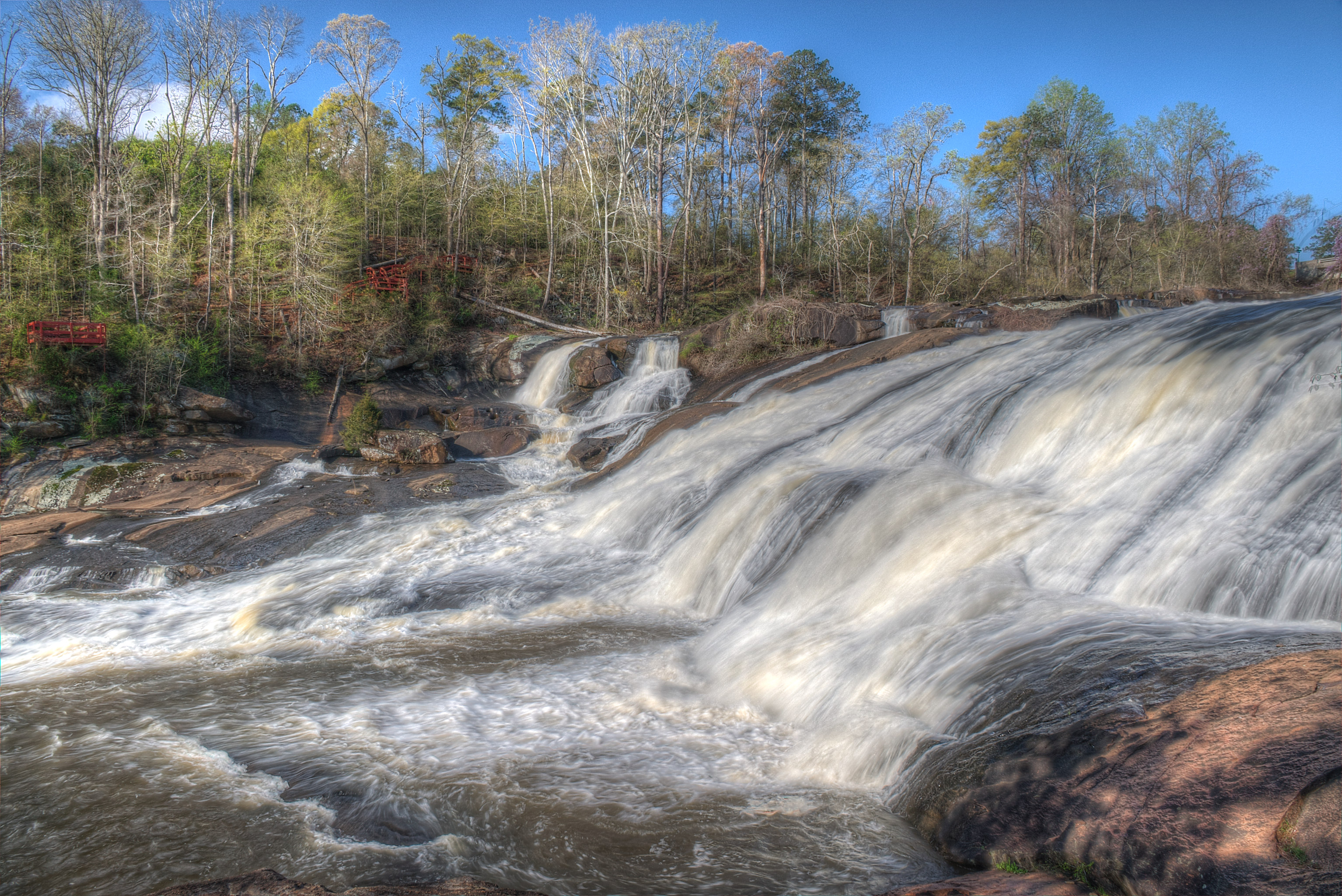
- Towaliga River at High Falls State Park

Location
- Country: United States

Physical characteristics
- Source
  - location: Georgia

The Towaliga River is a 52.3-mile-long (84.2 km) tributary of the Ocmulgee River in central Georgia. The Towaliga begins in Henry County and passes through High Falls State Park in northwestern Monroe County, then traverses the county and joins the Ocmulgee near the town of Juliette. The river begins north of Cole Reservoir in Henry County where it is joined by multiple creeks, including Thompson Creek, Troublesome Creek in Spalding County, Long Branch, and Lee Creek to gain size. The river is fairly muddy above High Falls Lake, but it clears once below the falls where most of the river is rock bottomed. This region is about 50 miles (80 km) south of Atlanta and about 35 miles (56 km) north of Macon.

The river was featured in a scene from the made-for-television movie Murder in Coweta County in which the ashes of the murdered victim are found floating in the nook of tree hollow along the bank of the river. The river was used as location only and does not actually flow through Coweta County, also located in Georgia.

== Name ==
The name probably derives from a Creek place name, but its meaning is unclear. Some say the name means "sumac place", while others believe it means "among trees". If you visit the Indian Springs State Park welcome center there's a book that suggests the names means "scalded scalp". This is said because Creek would scalp enemies and trespassers, and then place the scalps on the exposed rocks to bake in the sun as a warning to others not to poach on their land or leave the path. 3l

Pronunciation of "Towaliga" varies, according to Georgians. It is most commonly pronounced /taʊ(ə)ˈlaɪɡə/, but some insist that the local pronunciation sounds like /taɪˈlæɡi/ tye-LAG-ee. Others have heard it pronounced as /toʊˈɒləɡə/ toh-OL-ə-gə.Most of us locals pronounce it (tou,ah(lye)guh. or .tuh(wah)lig/uh.

== See also ==
- List of rivers of Georgia
