= Youngcane, Georgia =

Extinct town in the state of Georgia

Coordinates: 34.8325866°N 84.0788021°W

Youngcane is an extinct town in Union County, in the U.S. state of Georgia.

== History ==
A post office called Young Cane was established in 1846, and remained in operation until 1955. The community was named for its location on Youngcane Creek.
