= Wynns Mill, Georgia =

Coordinates: 33.3834503°N 84.0321349°W

Wynns Mill is an extinct town in Henry County, in the U.S. state of Georgia.

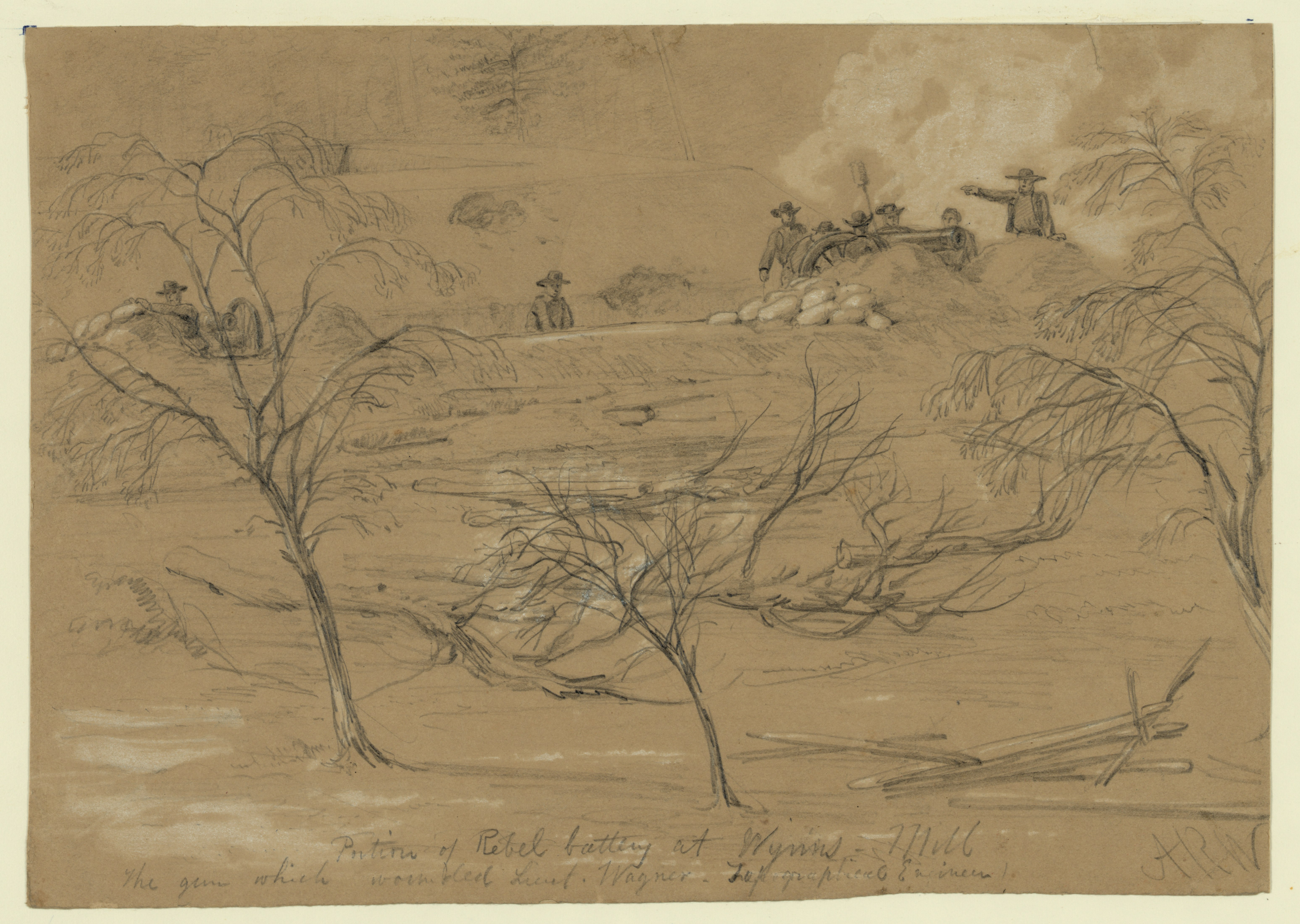
Civil War Confederate battery at Wynns Mill, drawn 1862

== History ==
The community was named after J.A. C. Wynn, proprietor of a local gristmill and sawmill. A post office called Wynn's Mill was established in 1877, and remained in operation until 1895.
