= Wireless Expense Management =

Wireless Expense Management (WEM) is an extension of Telecom Expense Management (TEM) services and is the process of managing enterprise's mobile and wireless devices. However, not only auditing invoices are enough to fully manage the device from procurement to retirement. Corporations need to be able to focus on their core business; the larger the business, the more there is to handle on a day-to-day basis. Businesses with a large mobile/cellular/wireless presence also have the expenses associated with them. These companies need professional Telecom Expense Management (TEM) to help them manage their wireless telecom bills accurately and effectively.

For a business with dedicated accounts payable departments, tracking evolving wireless technologies and General Ledger (GL), code changes resulting from acquisitions and mergers can be complex These departments may lack specialized expertise needed to verify the accuracy of telecom billing.

== Cellular (wireless) TEM ==
The first step in the 2-part process is capturing and analyzing the monthly cellular data and putting it into manageable reports. The second step is getting historical money back from the vendors and correcting the wireless invoices.

As simple as it may sound, these two steps are not so easy to do as there are any number of things that can change that will affect how much a wireless bill is and whether the company is being overcharged for services that have not been used.

Wireless devices need to be managed on a daily basis in real time. An effective and realistic plan needs to be put into place that enforces wireless policy and controls usage, this is critical to control costs. This is the job of a telecom auditing team or TEM. They can concentrate on optimization, ongoing wireless management and contract management to reduce costs and provide a managed invoice service. TEM provides contract compliance monthly checks, which catch overcharges from tariffs, surcharges, and taxes. This means that one knows exactly what they are paying for each month.

After the first initial audit of one's wireless telecom expenses they should find that their cellular services have been optimized, their overhead has been reduced and refunds paid back to their company so that immediately their company realizes the savings from the service of the TEM. This optimization focuses on the end user as well as viewing the group as a whole, while at the same time analyzing their voice, data, and features so that they only pay for the services that their business needs, thus lowering the amount one's company currently spends. Providing protection and benchmarking is important to each business and telecom auditing firm and these telecom auditing solutions really help in decreasing billing errors, tracking spending and increasing staff productivity. Even with companies offering BYOD (bring your own device), TEM providers can give consulting advice to help reduce overhead and ensure maximum savings. The cost for this service can be provided by many telecom expense management firms and some telecom auditing companies.

One's telecom auditing team (or TEM) can also take contract negotiation and compliance and the ongoing management of their wireless expenses out of their hands, resulting in monthly savings. Through the pooling of mobile optimization their TEM will identify wrong rate plans, unnecessary features, usage analysis, active and inactive phones, corrected surcharges, fees, and analysis for cellular and blackberry service as well as the analysis of data cards. This means that they only pay the taxes that they qualify for and get the tax exemptions that they deserve. You can reduce fees for SMS, data cards, data plan usage, voice pooling plans, international calling plans and usage, roaming, and extra fees that are not necessary to pay. With a centralized phone usage policy for wireless and bill processing one can ensure that their expenditure records are accurate. One's wireless invoices can also be authorized for bill payment which will result in less late fees and provide more information about their wireless phone network.

== Optimization process ==
This is the process that a TEM uses to optimize one's wireless needs while minimizing wireless bills. Historically this was a manual process that can be very time and labor intense. Starting in 2009, Ken Scourtas (ReCellular Solutions) automated many of the processes seen as standard in the WEM industry today.

Main WEM areas of work and support:

- They electronically capture one's data in real time.
- They analyze one's usage and compare it to more than 35,000 available cellular rate plans.
- They may recommend changes to one's service that will reduce the amount that one spends but will not cause any discomfort to the users.
- They analyze the records of data used and compare the digital bytes one is using to make sure that one is not paying for any unused minutes or unused wireless devices, data cards, or lines.
- They may recommend wireless policies to keep costs under control that will allow for checks of any abuses or fraudulent usages. This is critical if one has high international usage.
- They will provide one with a dashboard interface that allows access to your detailed cellular usage in real time. This provides one accurate data visibility and cost control, and improves efficiency and reduces waste. This gives one solid information to improve corporate planning, decision making, and budgeting providing future cost reductions.
