= Sweden, Georgia =

Coordinates: 34°32′36″N 84°38′31″W

Sweden is an extinct town in Pickens County, in the U.S. state of Georgia. The GNIS classifies it as a populated place.

== History ==
A post office called Sweden was established in 1894, and remained in operation until 1923. The community's name is a transfer from Sweden.
