= Walnut, Georgia =

Coordinates: 34°40′20.33″N 83°55′20.67″W

Walnut is an extinct town in Lumpkin County, in the U.S. state of Georgia.

== History ==
A post office called Walnut was established in 1892, and remained in operation until 1933. The community was named for the walnut trees native to the area.
