= Wisdoms Store, Georgia =

Coordinates: 32°51′10.47″N 84°57′58.76″W

Wisdoms Store is an extinct town in Harris County, in the U.S. state of Georgia.

== History ==
A post office called Wisdom's Store was established in 1856, and remained in operation until 1903. The community was named after William C. Wisdom (1833-1898), a local resident, county judge and state legislator.
