= Recovery, Georgia =

Unincorporated community in Georgia, U.S.

Coordinates: 30°45′24″N 84°44′15″W

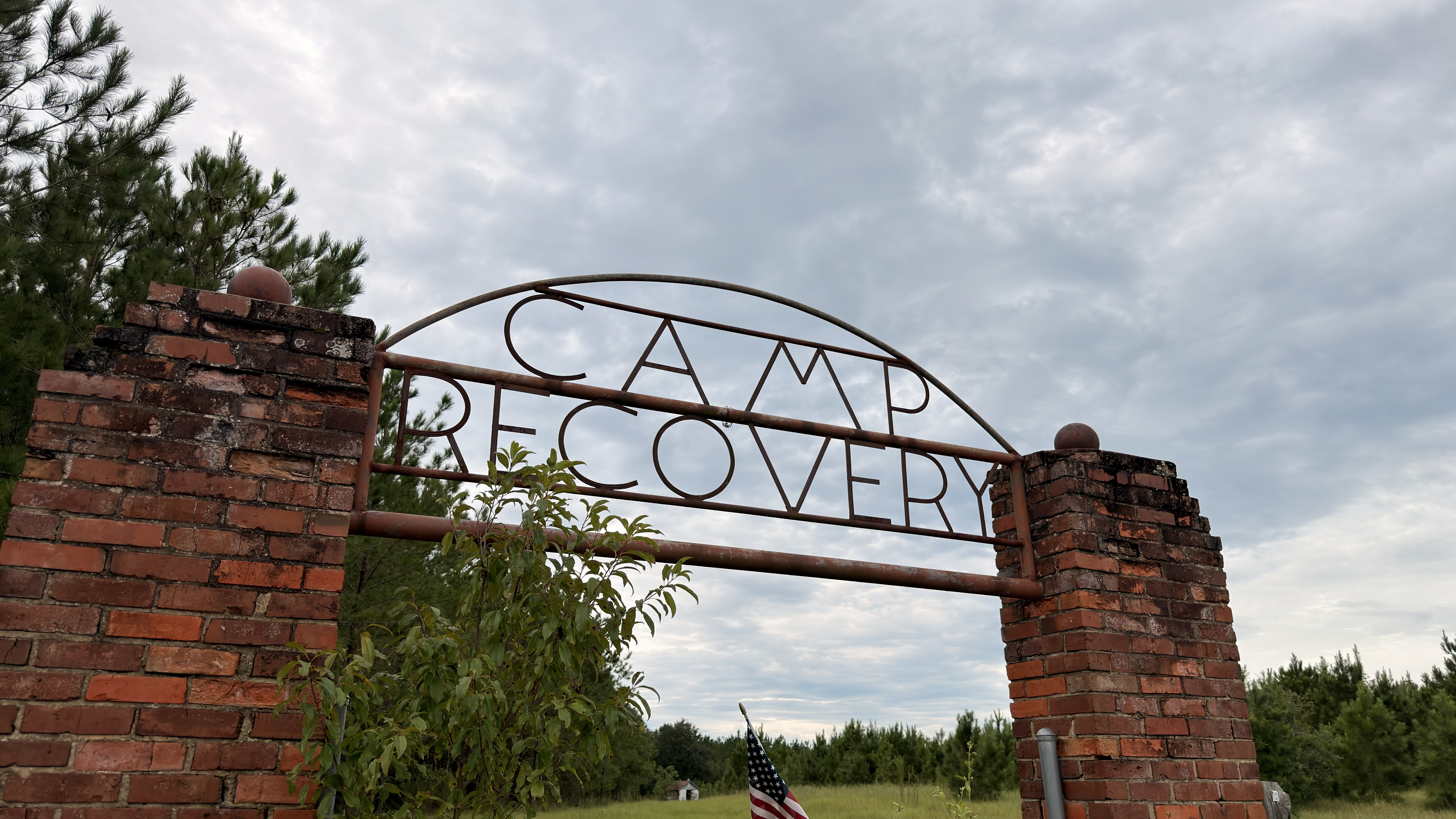
Askew image of the Camp Recovery gate

Recovery is an unincorporated community in Decatur County, Georgia, United States.

== History ==
The community's name originates from Camp Recovery, established during the First Seminole Indian Wars as a hospital base to which the sick soldiers from Fort Scott were sent to recover. Camp Recovery was occupied for only two months, but the suffering of the men there produced a lasting impact on the area. The story of the poor soldiers and their dying days at the camp is well known by local residents. A Federal Monument on the site marks the burial place of U.S. officers and soldiers who died during the hostilities in the Flint and Chattahoochee River Counties 1817–1821. A post office called Recovery was established in 1885, and remained in operation until 1948.

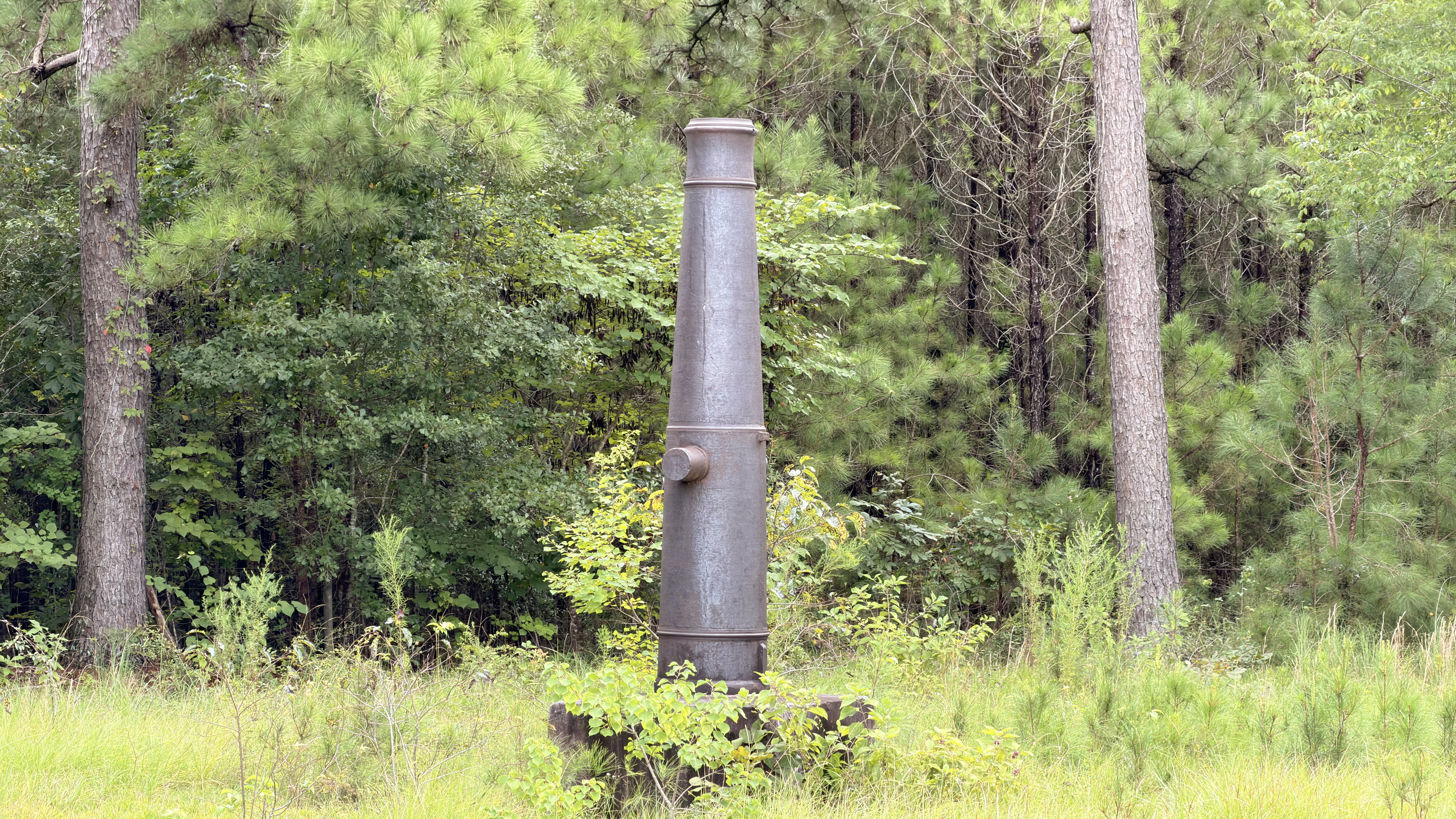
A closer look at the 34-pound cannon memorial
