= Woodstown, Georgia =

Georgia ghost town

Coordinates: 33°26′20.42″N 83°57′22.67″W

Woodstown is an extinct town in Henry County, in the U.S. state of Georgia.

== History ==
A post office called Woodstown was established in 1893, and remained in operation until 1901. William Woods, an early postmaster, gave the town his last name.
