= Roanoke, Georgia =

Coordinates: 32°1′53.56″N 85°3′9.75″W

Roanoke is an extinct town in Stewart County, in the U.S. state of Georgia.

== History ==
The Georgia General Assembly incorporated Roanoke as a town in 1832. The community most likely was named after Roanoke Island, in North Carolina.

In 1836, the town was looted and burned by Creek Indians, and never was subsequently rebuilt. The ruined town site today lies beneath the waters of the Walter F. George Reservoir.
