= Samuel Bernard =

Samuel Bernard may refer to:

- Samuel Bernard (financier) (1651–1739), French noble and financier
- Samuel Bernard (artist) (1615–1687), his father, French miniature painter and engraver
- Samuel Bernard (politician), speaker of the House of Assembly of Jamaica for 1679–88

== See also ==
- Sam Bernard (1863–1927), English-born American vaudeville comedian
