= Greenbush Branch =

Stream in Walker County, Georgia, U.S.

Coordinates: 34°37′38″N 85°10′48″W

Greenbush Branch is a stream in Walker County, in the U.S. state of Georgia.

Greenbush Branch was named after the green bush on a settler's property.

== See also ==
- List of rivers of Georgia (U.S. state)
