= Eelbeck, Georgia =

Coordinates: 32°26′31″N 84°45′10″W

Eelbeck is an extinct town in Chattahoochee County, in the U.S. state of Georgia. The GNIS classifies it as a populated place.

== History ==
A variant name was "Millville". The area that became Eelbeck was first settled around 1826 and developed into a grist-milling community centered on Cook’s Mill before its lands were absorbed by the Fort Benning military reservation in 1941. A post office called Eelbeck was established in 1887, and remained in operation until 1902. Henry J. Eelbeck, an early postmaster, gave the community his last name.
