= Newbridge, Ceredigion =

Village in Ceredigion, Wales

Coordinates: 52.210639°N 4.185102°W

Newbridge
- Location within Ceredigion
- OS grid reference: SN 508 592
  - Cardiff: 66.4 mi (106.9 km)
  - London: 179.8 mi (289.4 km)
- Community: Ciliau Aeron
- Principal area: Ceredigion
- Country: Wales
- Sovereign state: United Kingdom
- Post town: Aberaeron
- Postcode district: SA48
- Police: Dyfed-Powys
- Fire: Mid and West Wales
- Ambulance: Welsh
- UK Parliament: Ceredigion Preseli
- Senedd Cymru – Welsh Parliament: Ceredigion Penfro

Newbridge is a small village in the community of Ciliau Aeron, Ceredigion, Wales. Newbridge is on the A482 road between Aberaeron and Lampeter.

It is represented in the Senedd by Elin Jones (Plaid Cymru) and is part of the Ceredigion Preseli constituency in the House of Commons.
