= Youngcane Creek =

- Location within Georgia

Physical characteristics
- Source
  - coordinates: 34.8042531°N 84.1335256°W
- Mouth
  - coordinates: 34.9067522°N 84.0446329°W

Youngcane Creek is a stream in the U.S. state of Georgia.

The stream was named after Young Cane, the son of Long Cane, a Cherokee chieftain. Variant names are "Pine Log Creek" and "Young Cane Creek".
