= Greenbush Township, Alcona County, Michigan =

Greenbush Township, Michigan
- Civil township
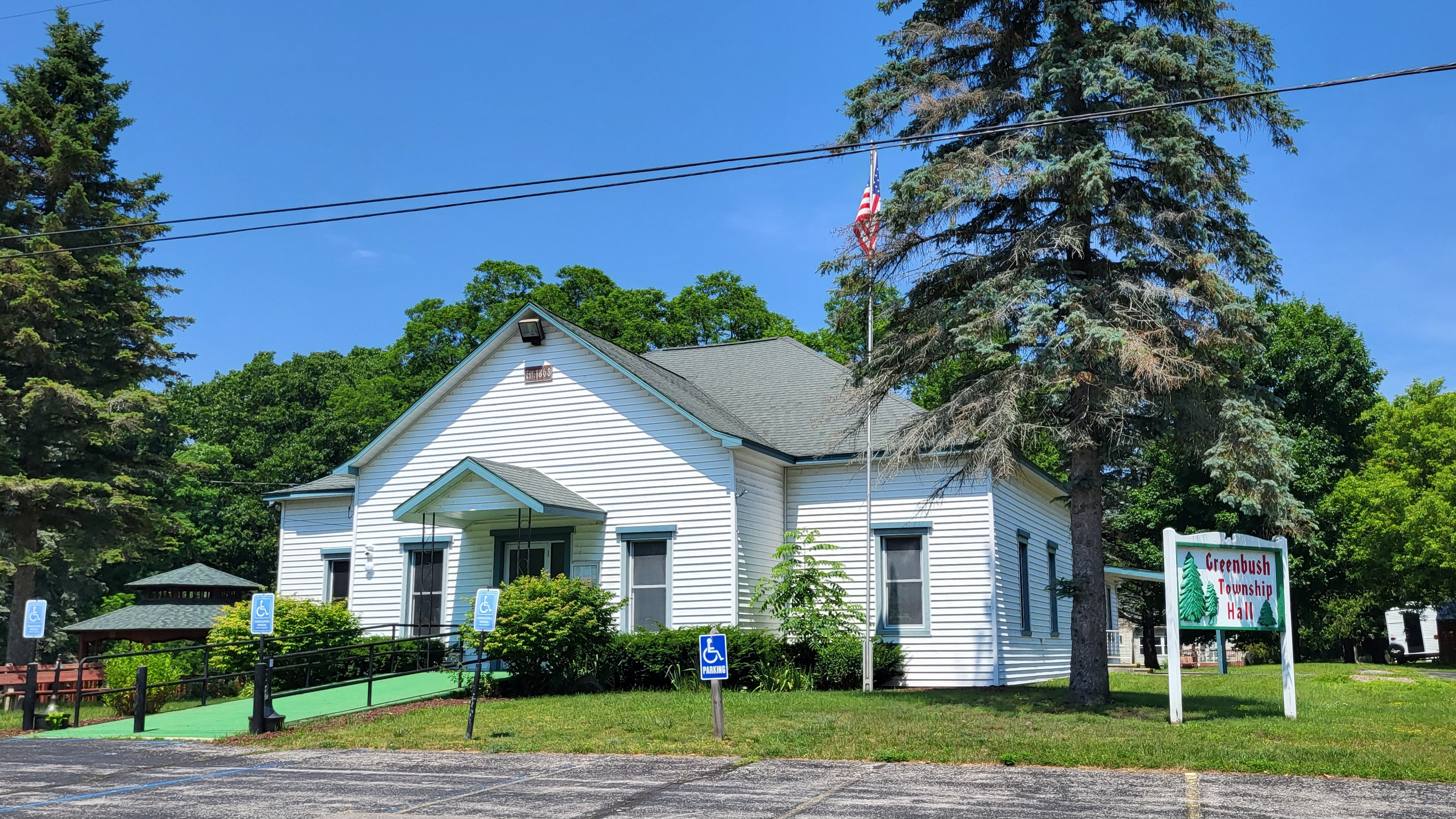
- Greenbush Township Hall in Greenbush

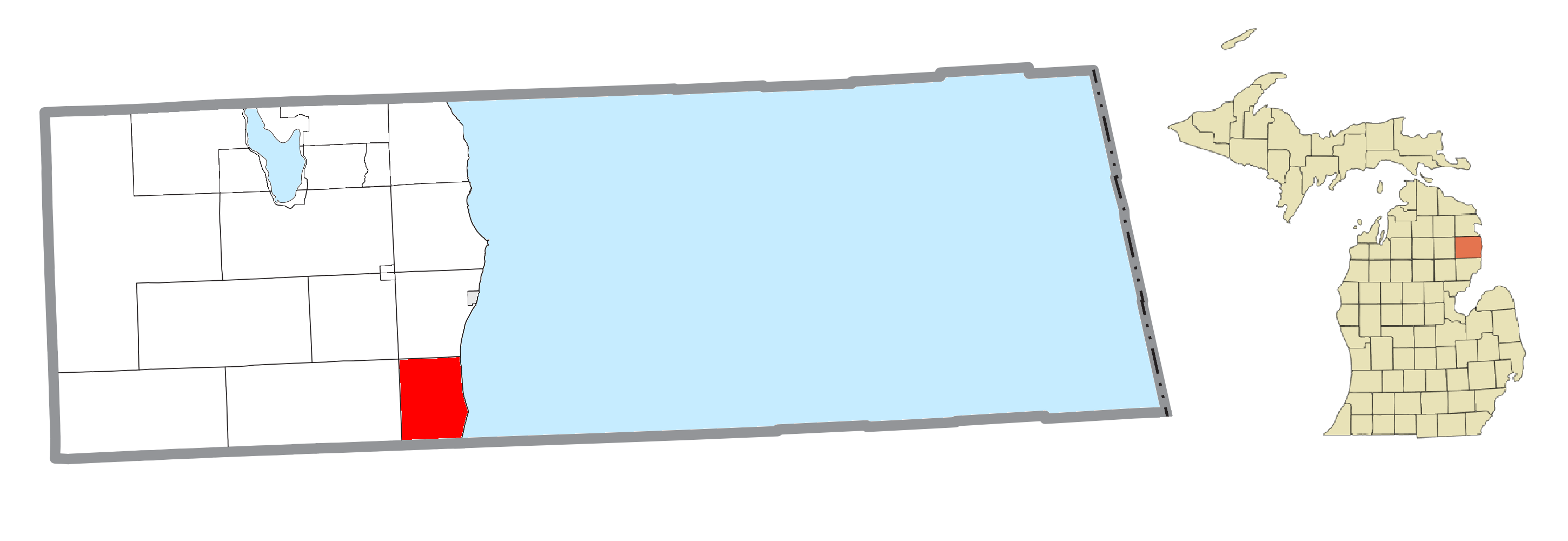
- Location within Alcona County

- Location within the state of Michigan Location within the United States
- Coordinates: 44°33′18″N 83°20′05″W
- Country: United States
- State: Michigan
- County: Alcona
- Established: 1868

Government
  - Supervisor: C. Lee Major
  - Clerk: Shannon Story

Area
  - Total: 26.15 sq mi (67.7 km^{2})
  - Land: 24.92 sq mi (64.5 km^{2})
  - Water: 1.23 sq mi (3.2 km^{2})
- Elevation: 636 ft (194 m)

Population (2020)
  - Total: 1,270
  - Density: 51.0/sq mi (19.7/km^{2})
- Time zone: UTC-5 (Eastern (EST))
  - Summer (DST): UTC-4 (EDT)
- ZIP code(s): 48738 (Greenbush); 48745 (Mikado)
- Area code: 989
- FIPS code: 26-34820
- GNIS feature ID: 1626394
- Website: greenbushtwp.net

Greenbush Township is a civil township of Alcona County in the U.S. state of Michigan. The population was 1,270 at the 2020 census.

== Communities ==
- Greenbush is an unincorporated area located along U.S. Route 23 on the shores of Lake Huron at 44°35′16″N 83°18′59″W. The community was settled as early as 1848 by Crosier Davison from Detroit, who built a fishery and cooperage. The Morris & McDougal company from New York bought tracts of government land for their lumber operations in 1862. The area was referred to as McDougal's Landing. In 1867, lumber magnate William Conklin suggested naming the community after Greenbush, New York. A post office named Greenbush opened on May 16, 1870. The Greenbush post office remains open and uses the 48738 ZIP Code, which serves the eastern section of Greenbush Township and small areas of Oscoda Township to the south and Harrisville Township to the north.

== Geography ==
According to the U.S. Census Bureau, the township has a total area of 26.15 square miles (67.73 km^{2}), of which 24.92 square miles (64.54 km^{2}) is land and 1.23 square miles (3.19 km^{2}) (4.70%) is water.

Greenbush Township has a shoreline along Lake Huron and also has portions included in the Huron National Forest.

=== Major highways ===
- US 23 runs along the eastern portion of the township near Lake Huron.

== Demographics ==
Historical population
Census	Pop.	Note	%±
1960	536		—
1970	760		41.8%
1980	1,292		70.0%
1990	1,371		6.1%
2000	1,499		9.3%
2010	1,409		−6.0%
2020	1,270		−9.9%
Source: Census Bureau. Census 1960- 2000, 2010.

As of the census of 2000, there were 1,499 people, 685 households, and 474 families residing in the township. The population density was 60.2 inhabitants per square mile (23.2/km^{2}). There were 1,453 housing units at an average density of 58.3 per square mile (22.5/km^{2}). The racial makeup of the township was 98.00% White, 0.40% African American, 0.33% Native American, 0.33% Asian, 0.07% from other races, and 0.87% from two or more races. Hispanic or Latino of any race were 0.53% of the population.

There were 685 households, out of which 17.7% had children under the age of 18 living with them, 61.3% were married couples living together, 4.7% had a female householder with no husband present, and 30.8% were non-families. 27.3% of all households were made up of individuals, and 16.4% had someone living alone who was 65 years of age or older. The average household size was 2.19 and the average family size was 2.60.

In the township the population was spread out, with 17.5% under the age of 18, 3.3% from 18 to 24, 19.5% from 25 to 44, 32.8% from 45 to 64, and 26.9% who were 65 years of age or older. The median age was 52 years. For every 100 females, there were 104.5 males. For every 100 females age 18 and over, there were 101.0 males.

The median income for a household in the township was $32,823, and the median income for a family was $35,789. Males had a median income of $29,625 versus $20,385 for females. The per capita income for the township was $18,248. About 8.7% of families and 11.1% of the population were below the poverty line, including 14.9% of those under age 18 and 6.1% of those age 65 or over.

== Education ==
Greenbush Township is served entirely by Oscoda Area Schools to the south in Iosco County.
