= Owensbyville, Georgia =

Coordinates: 33°11′14″N 85°05′10″W

Owensbyville is an extinct town in Heard County, in the U.S. state of Georgia. The GNIS classifies it as a populated place.

== History ==
A post office called Owensbyville was established in 1875 and remained in operation until 1909. John M. Owensby, an early postmaster, gave the community his last name.
