= Treat, Georgia =

Ghost town in Haralson and Polk County, Georgia

Coordinates: 33°54′05″N 85°21′58″W

Treat is an extinct town in Haralson and Polk counties, in the U.S. state of Georgia. Treat was laid out ca. 1907 and named after a first settler's acquaintance in New York. A post office called Treat was established in 1907 and remained in operation until 1912.
