= Westlake, Georgia =

Extinct town located in Georgia, United States

Coordinates: 32°29′20.53″N 83°29′0.65″W

Westlake (sometimes spelled out as "West Lake") is an extinct town in Twiggs County, in the U.S. state of Georgia. The GNIS classifies it as a populated place.

== History ==
An early variant name was "Buzzard Roost". A post office called Buzzard Roost was established in 1872, the name was changed to West Lake in 1885, and the post office closed in 1925. The community was named for a lake west of the original town site.
