= Laingkat, Georgia =

Extinct town in Georgia

Coordinates: 30°43′10″N 84°29′18″W

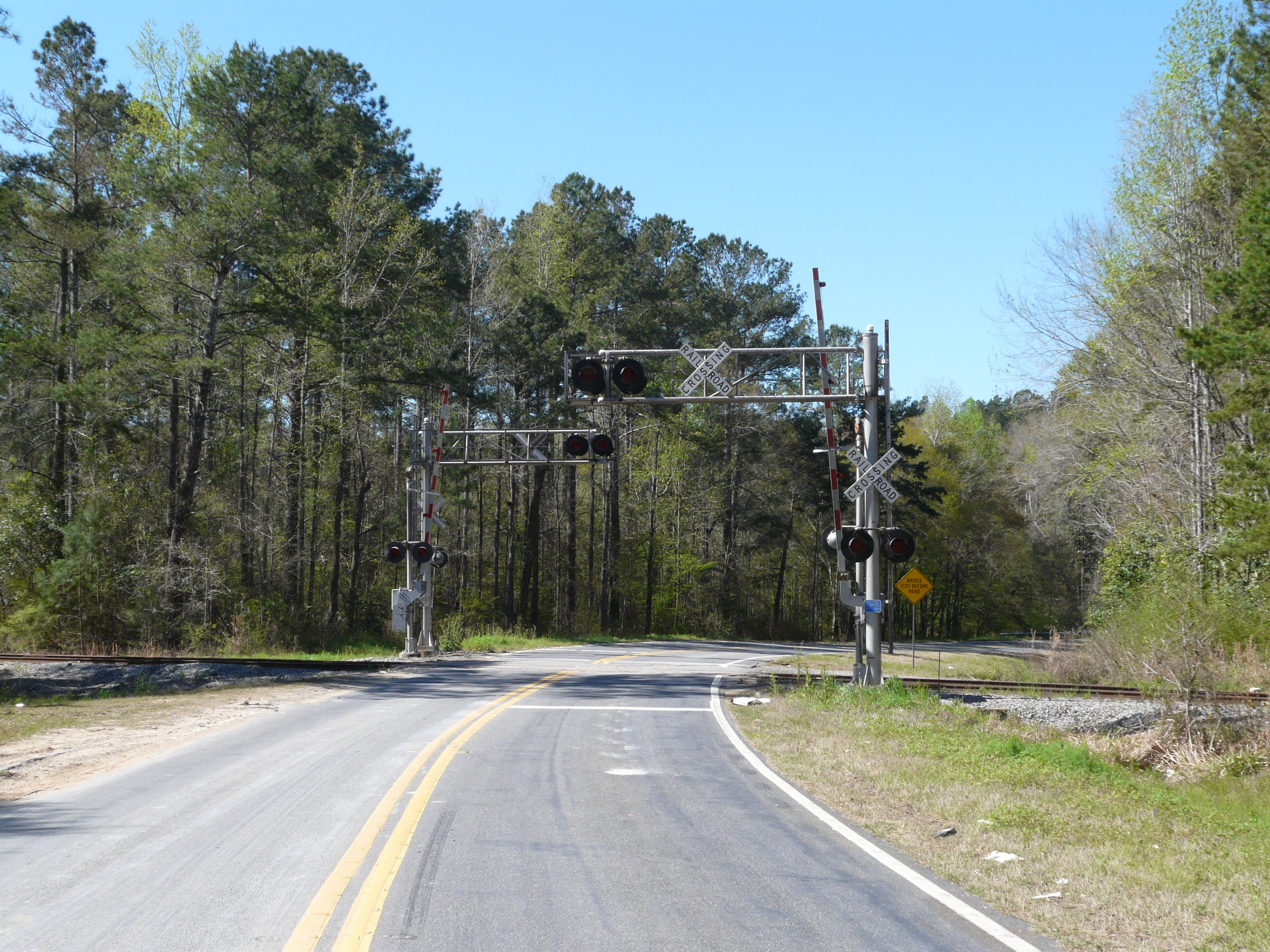
Railroad crossing on Georgia State Route 241 at the former site of Laingkat

Laingkat is an extinct town in Decatur County, in the U.S. state of Georgia. The GNIS classifies it as a populated place. A variant name is "Land Cat".

== History ==
The community was named after Langkat, in the Indonesian province of North Sumatra, the origin of a type of tobacco grown locally in Georgia.
