= Cheevertown, Georgia =

Ghost town in Baker County, Georgia, USA

Coordinates: 31°11′26.60″N 84°31′4.28″W

Cheevertown is an extinct town in Baker County, Georgia, United States.

== History ==
A post office called Cheevertown was established in 1882, and remained in operation until 1894. The town was listed as having a population of 100 in 1897.^{:3150} The community most likely was named after William W. Cheever, a pioneer citizen. On March 14, 1914, a headless body was found on the banks of the Flint River here. Nobody knows who killed or how he was killed.

== See also ==
- Dewsville, Georgia
- Constitution, Georgia
