= Shackelton, Georgia =

Shackelton
- Ghost town
- Location in Georgia Location in the United States
- Coordinates: 34°26′10″N 85°16′45″W
- Country: United States
- State: Georgia
- County: Chattooga
- Established: 1909

Shackelton is a ghost town in Chattooga County, in the U.S. state of Georgia.

== History ==
Shackelton was founded in 1909 as a mining community, and was abandoned in the 1920s when the nearby mines closed. A post office called Shackelton was in operation during 1910 and 1911.
