= Barnett Shoals, Georgia =

Coordinates: 33°50′33″N 83°18′42″W

The settlement of Barnett Shoals before the 1910–11 construction of the Barnett Shoals Dam and the 1915 incorporation of the town

Barnett Shoals is a former town in Oconee County, in the U.S. state of Georgia. Other names were Barnett's Fort and Rutherford.

== History ==
Barnett Shoals had its start as a mill town, anchored by the Star Thread Mill. The Georgia General Assembly incorporated Barnett Shoals as a town in 1915. The town was officially dissolved in 1995 along with many other inactive Georgia municipalities.
