= High Falls State Park =

State park in Jackson, Georgia, United States

- IUCN category V (protected landscape/seascape)
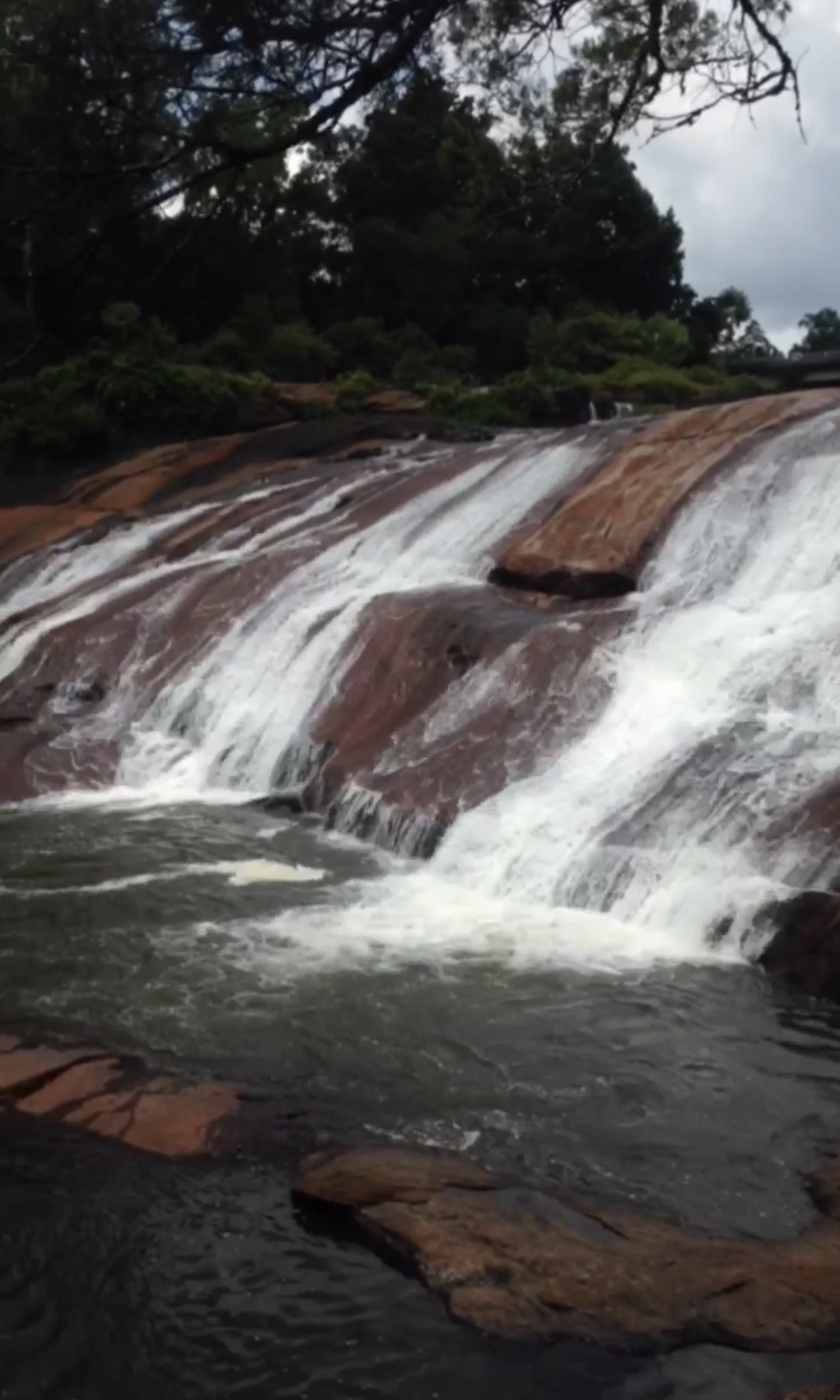
- High Falls State Park
- Interactive map of High Falls State Park
- Location: Monroe County, Georgia, U.S.
- Nearest city: Jackson
- Coordinates: 33.18123°N 84.01602°W
- Area: 1,050 acres (4 km^{2})
- Governing body: Georgia Department of Natural Resources
- Website: gastateparks.org/HighFalls

High Falls State Park is a 1,050-acre (4.2 km^{2}) state park located near the city of Jackson in Monroe County, Georgia. It is the site of a prosperous 19th-century industrial center, which became a ghost town when it was bypassed by the railroad. The park contains the largest waterfall in middle Georgia and a 650-acre (2.6 km^{2}) lake.

== History ==
In the early 19th century, the park's land was a prosperous industrial town with several stores, a grist mill, cotton gin, blacksmith shop, and shoe factory. However, the town, called High Falls, became a ghost town in the 1880s when it was bypassed by a major railroad. The remains of the bridge on Old Alabama Road still partially stand to offer views of the shoals below the dam. The bridge, constructed in 1890, was mostly destroyed in the flood of 1994. The park's trails offer visitors scenic views of the largest waterfall in middle Georgia on the Towaliga River, cascading over 135 feet (41 m) to the base. Historic hikes lead to the foundation of the old grist mill and ruins of the old powerhouse. The park contains a 650-acre (2.6 km^{2}) lake.

== Facilities ==
- 97 tent/trailer/RV Campsites
- 5 picnic shelters
- 1 Paddle-In Primitive Campsite
- 1 Group shelter
- 1 Pioneer Campground
- Miniature golf course
- Swimming pool

== Annual events ==
- Canoe trips
- Forsythia Festival Crappie Tournament (March)

== Popular culture ==
Dickey Betts of The Allman Brothers Band wrote an instrumental titled "High Falls", named after the park, that came out in 1975. The recording is 14½ minutes long.

== Park information ==
The park is open from 7:00 a.m. to 10:00 p.m. and the office is open from 8 p.m. until 5 p.m. The park is free for the community, parking is $5 and there are annual passes that can be purchased. The address to easily get to the park using your GPS is 76 High Falls Park Drive, Jackson, Georgia, 30233.

== Images ==
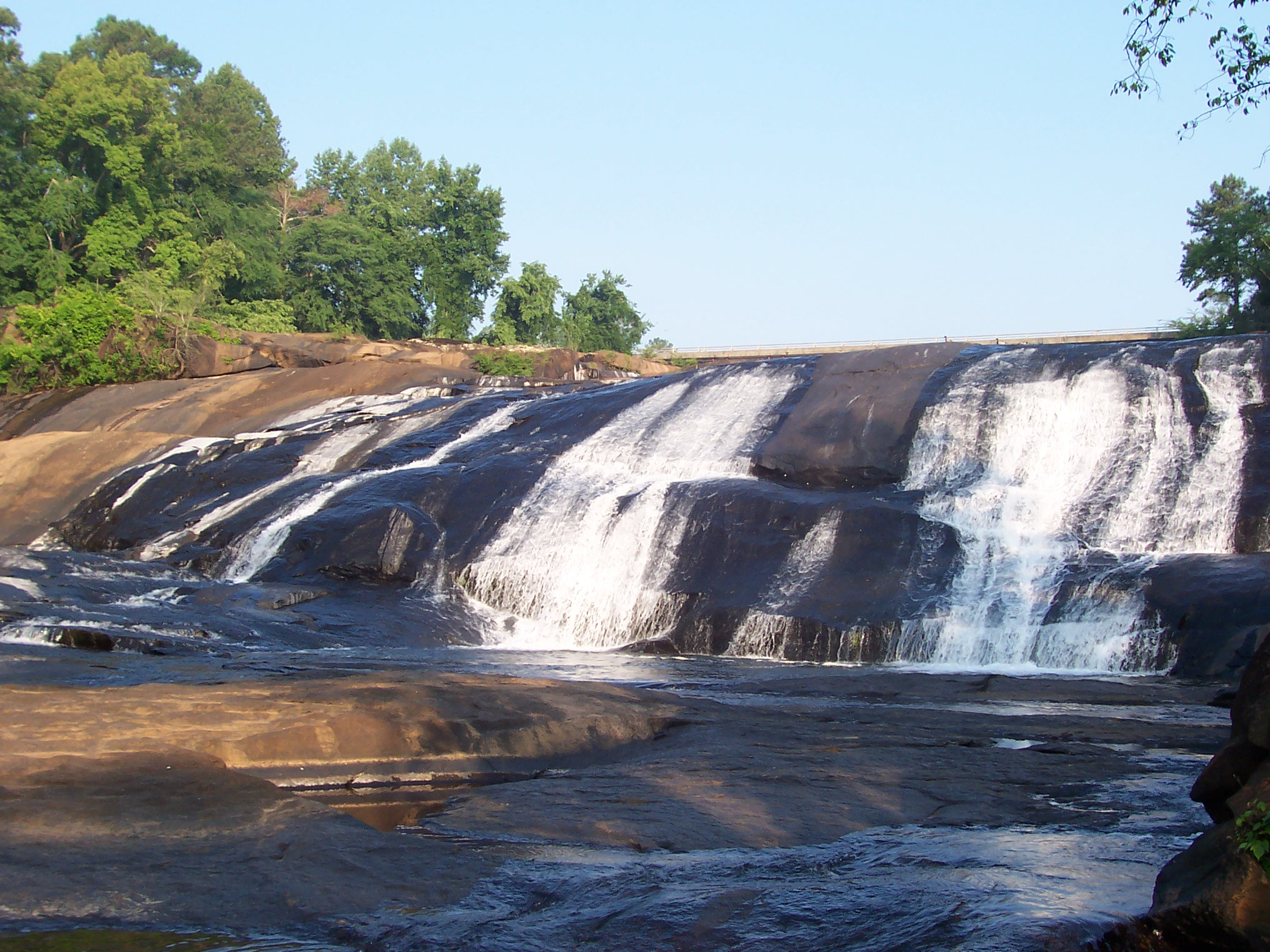
High Falls

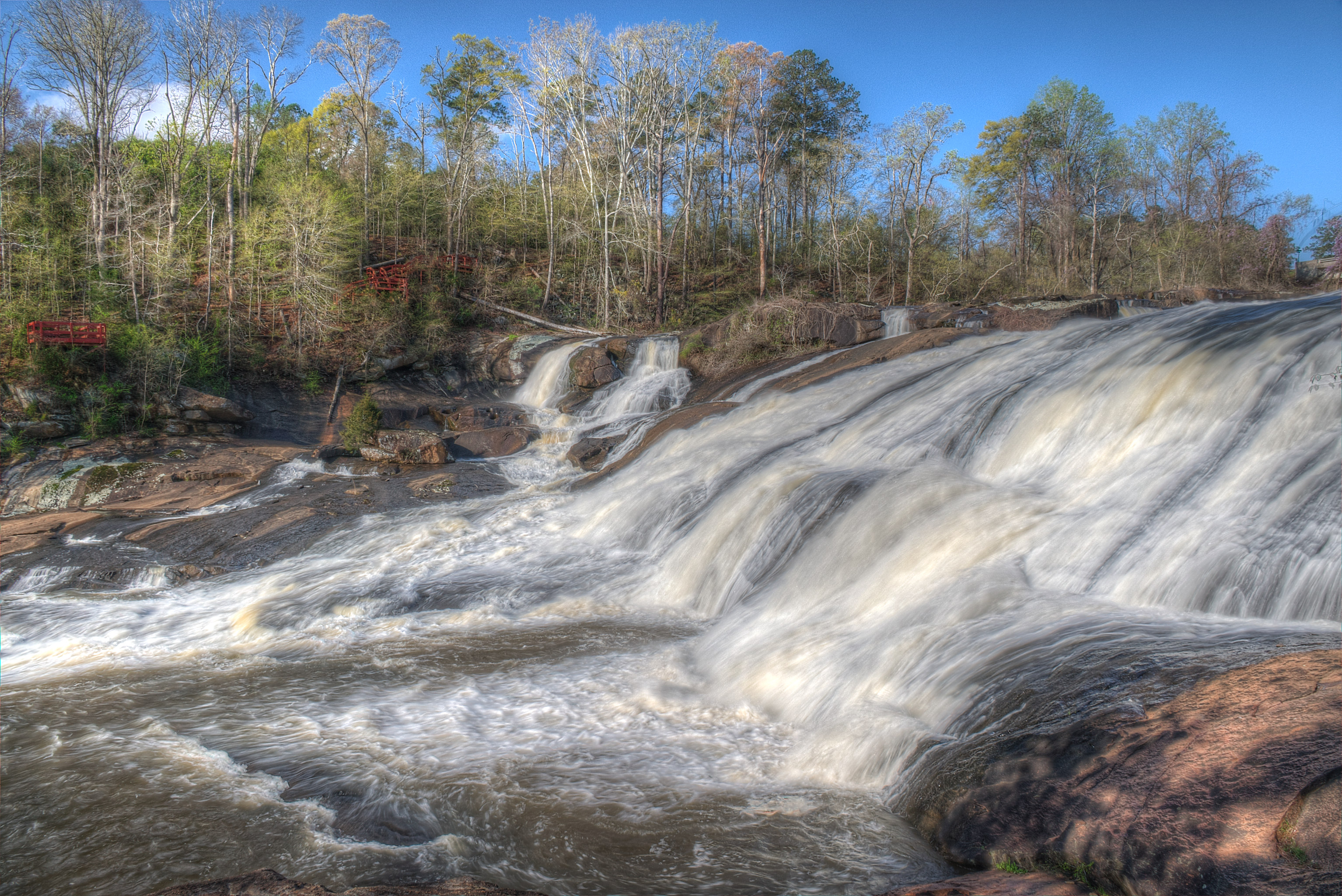
High Falls

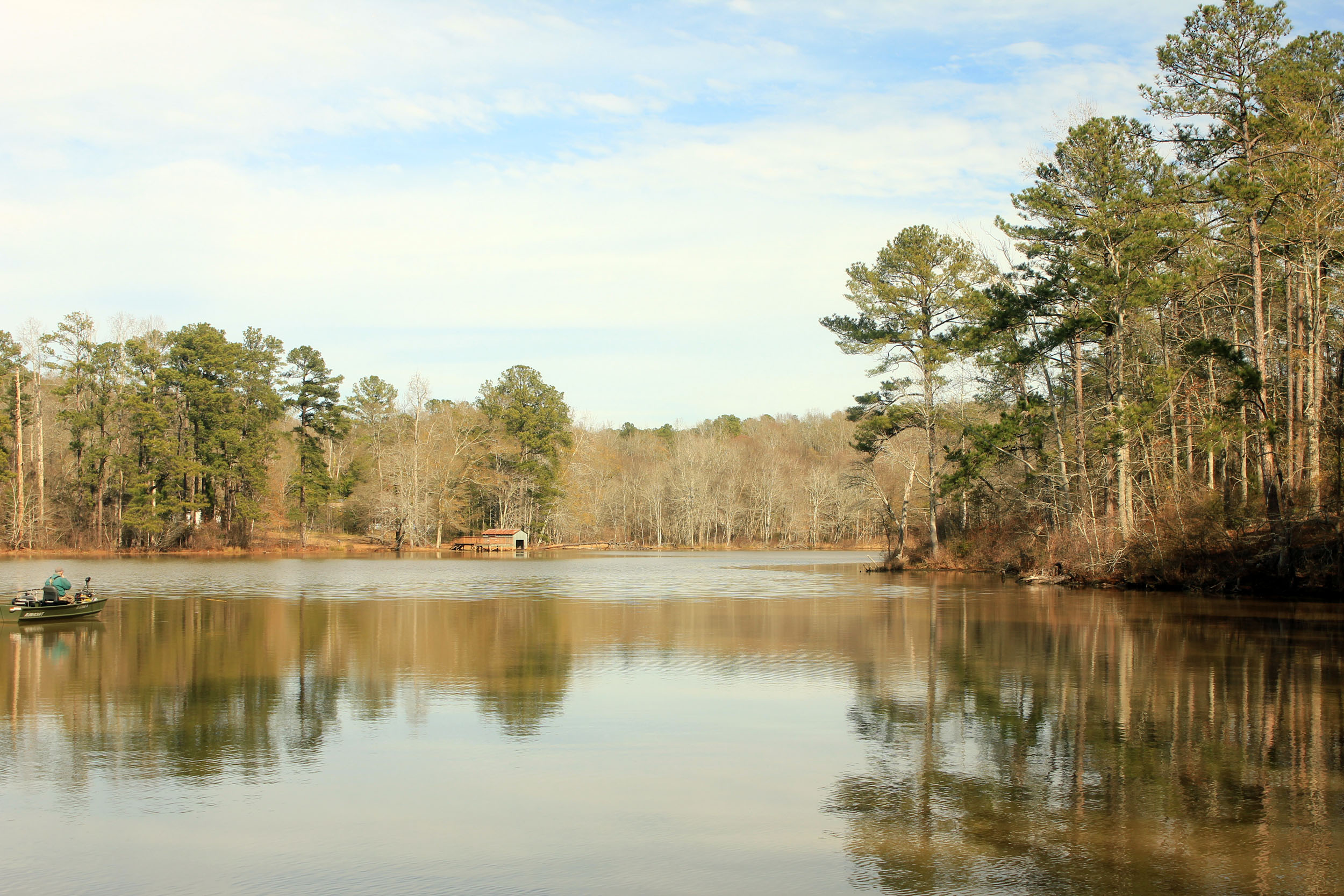
Lake at High Falls

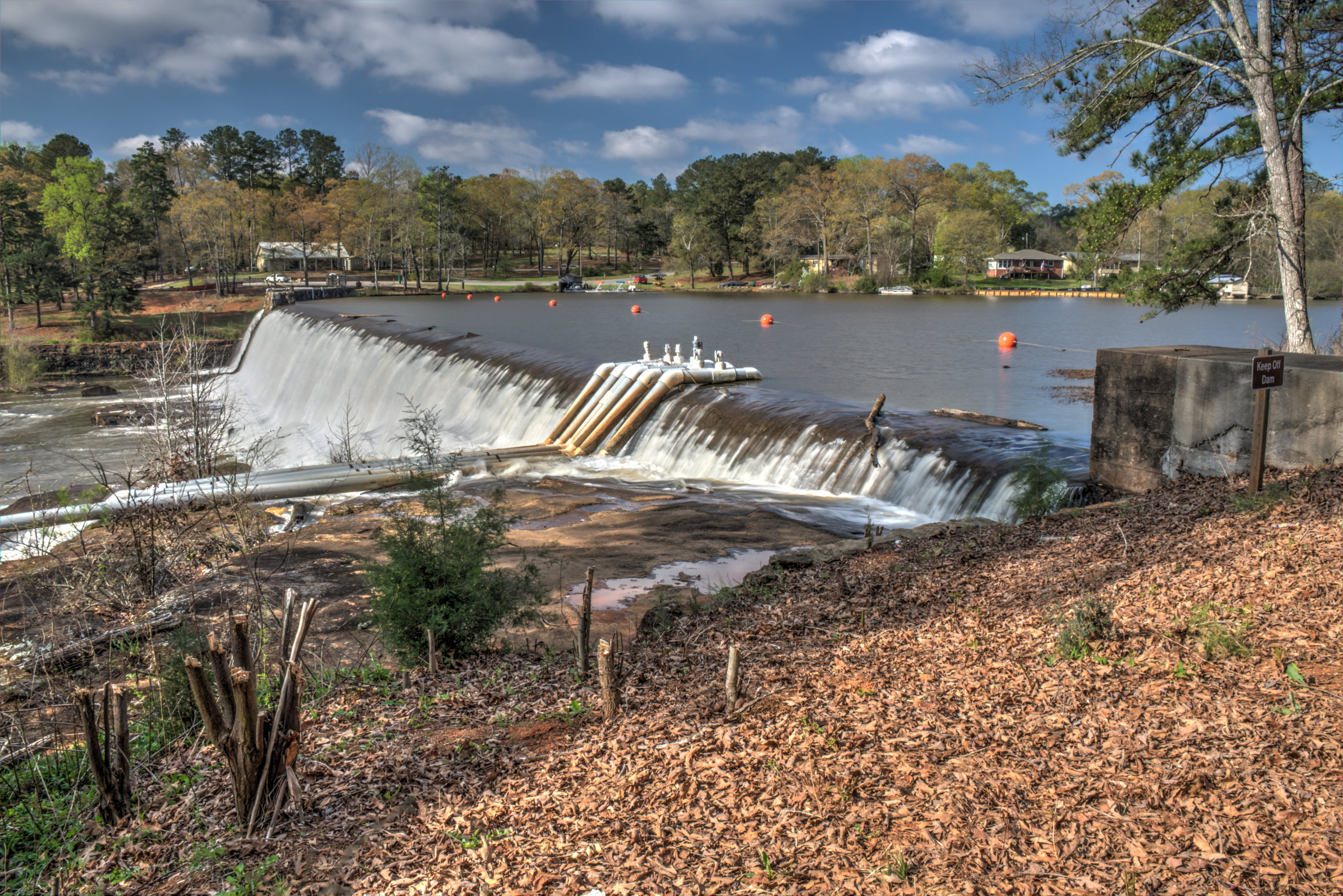
High Falls Dam

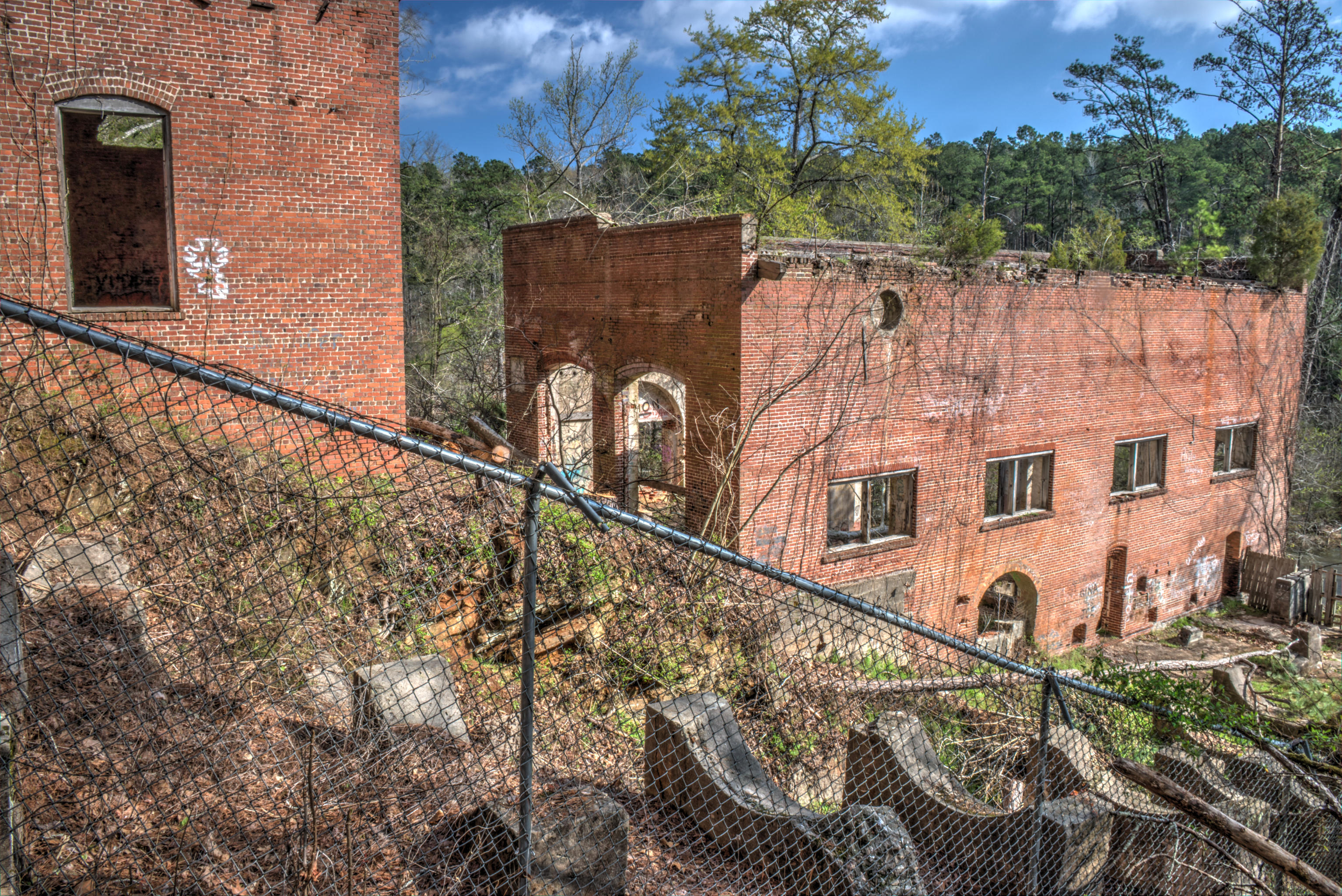
Remains of powerhouse

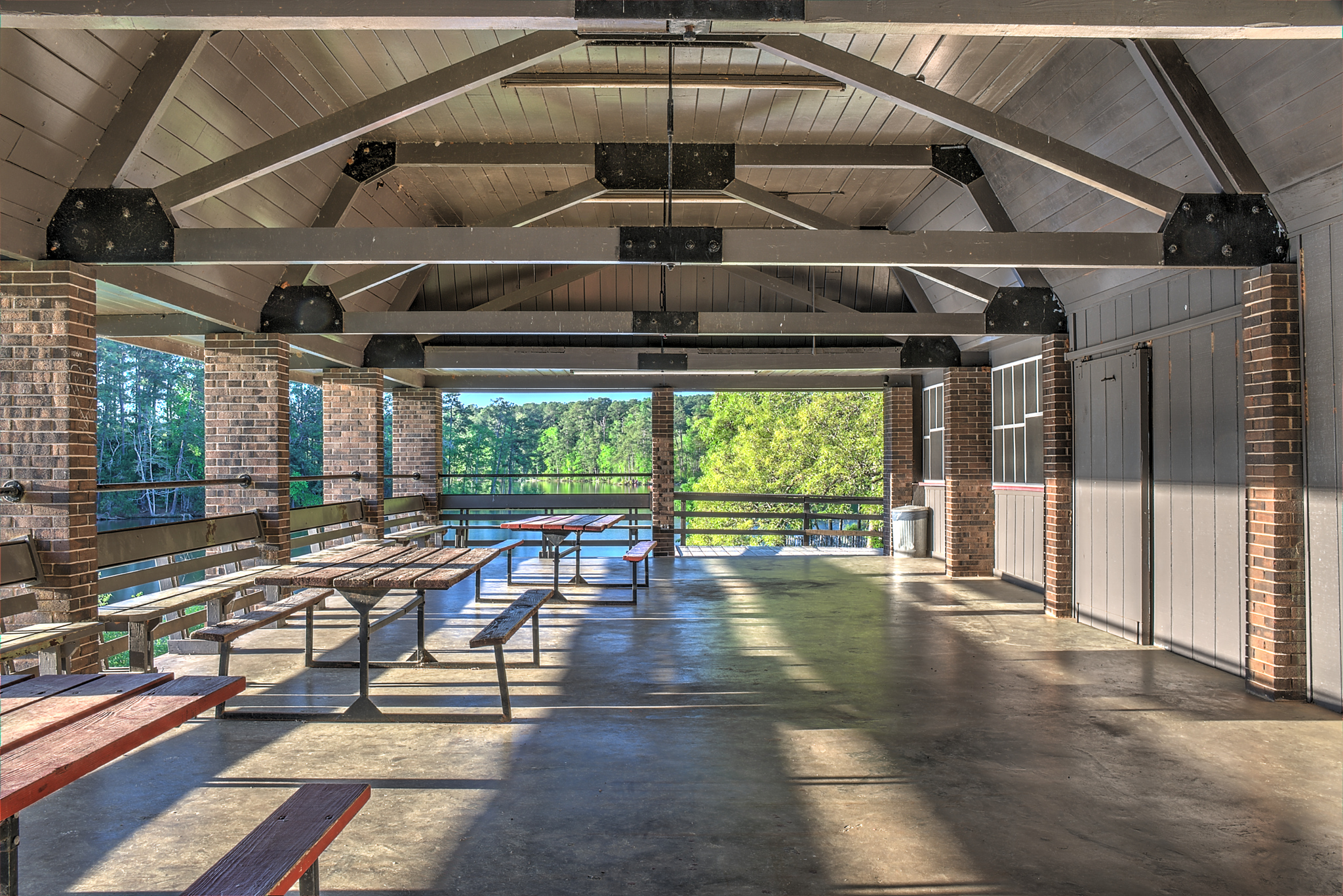
Picnic tables overlooking High Falls Lake
