= Socrates, Georgia =

Coordinates: 33°8′4.45″N 84°1′42.68″W

Socrates is an extinct town in Monroe County, in the U.S. state of Georgia.

== History ==
The community was named after Socrates (c. 469 BC – 399 BC), the ancient Athenian philosopher.
