= Birdford, Georgia =

Coordinates: 31°58′32″N 81°53′38″W

Birdford is an extinct town in Tattnall County, in the U.S. state of Georgia.

== History ==
A post office called Birdford was established in 1880, and remained in operation until 1907. The community had a depot on the Register and Glennville Railroad.
