= Fairview, Chattooga County, Georgia =

Extinct town

Fairview
- Ghost town
- Location in Georgia Location in the United States
- Country: United States
- State: Georgia
- County: Chattooga

Fairview is an extinct town in Chattooga County, in the U.S. state of Georgia.

== History ==
The community was named from scenic and "fair" views of nearby mountains.
