= Floydtown, Georgia =

Town in the United States

Coordinates: 31°08′02″N 84°46′02″W

Floydtown is an extinct town in Miller County, in the U.S. state of Georgia.

== History ==
According to tradition, the community was named after Thomas S. Floyd, a storekeeper.
