= The Reach Gallery Museum =

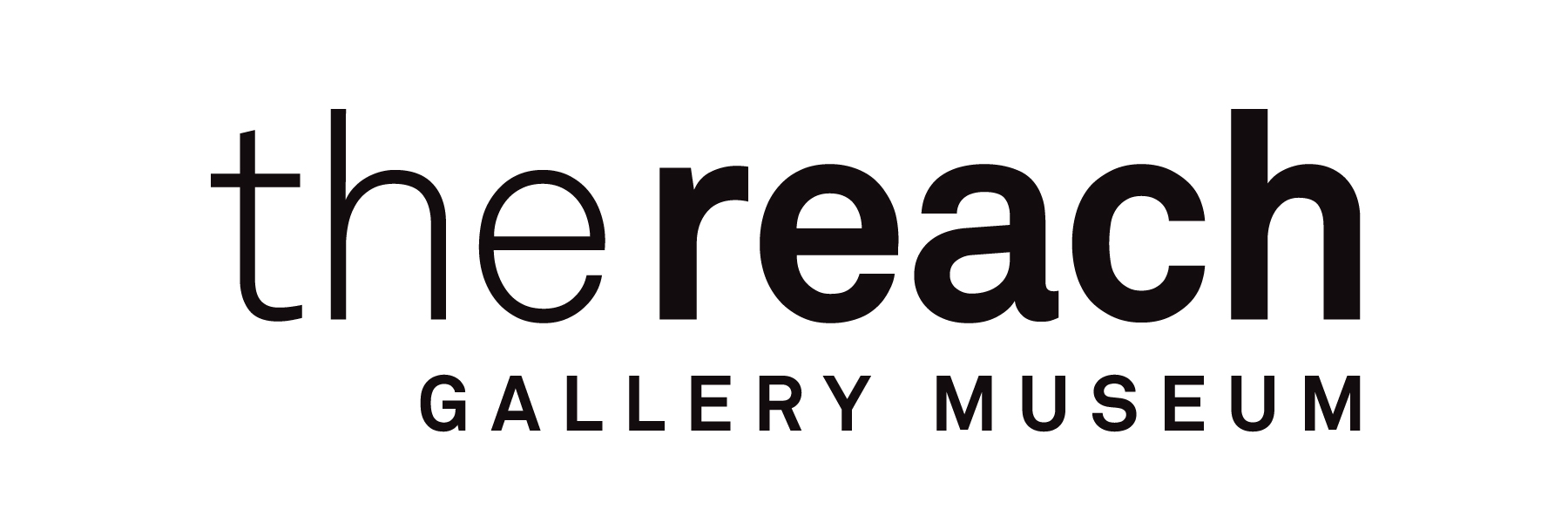
- Established: 2008
- Location: 32388 Veterans Way; Abbotsford, British Columbia; V2T 0B3
- Coordinates: 49.0528°N 122.3273°W
- Type: Encyclopedic, Art museum
- Director: Laura C Schneider
- Website: www.thereach.ca

The Reach Gallery Museum is a public art gallery and museum located in Abbotsford, British Columbia. It exhibits artwork from across Canada and around the world. The Reach is also the regional archival repository and houses a significant collection of material culture from the Abbotsford region.

The entire structure is a 20,000 square foot Leadership in Energy and Environmental Design (LEED) building with 6,100 square feet of exhibition space. In addition to the Great Hall and two community exhibition spaces, The Reach has a multi-purpose studio for innovative arts and heritage programming, two climate controlled storage areas, and a flexible, multi-purpose public programming space.

== Location ==
The gallery is located at 32388 Veterans Way, Abbotsford, British Columbia. It is part of the municipal complex that includes City Hall.

== History ==
Abbotsford City Council, with the support of the majority of its citizens, believed the municipality would benefit from a dedicated, professional arts and culture facility. In December 2005 the City established the Abbotsford Museum and Art Gallery Steering Committee in order to explore community aspirations for the planned centre.

From the outset, community stakeholders voiced their desire for a unique design. Draft plans were developed and public information sessions and open houses in 2006 and early 2007 invited public input on these plans. Construction, undertaken by PCL Constructors Inc. began shortly after that in June 2007 and the building was officially opened on September 22 of 2008 with a ceremony presided over by then mayor George F. Ferguson. The finished building had cost approximately $10.5 million, original estimates stating the project was about $345,000 under budget.

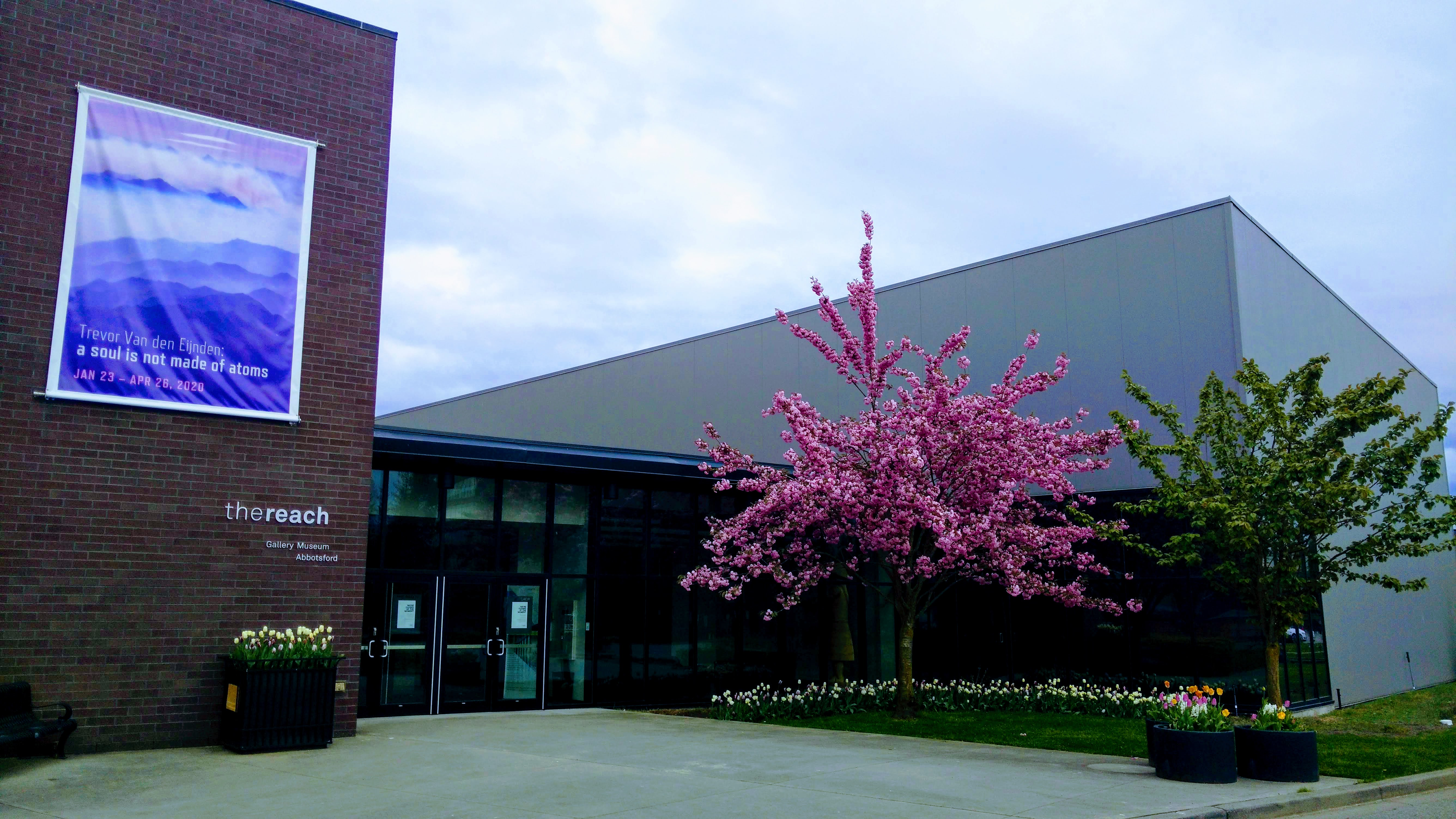
The Reach Gallery Museum

== Exhibitions ==
The Gallery has both permanent and rotating art exhibitions featuring significant local, regional, and national content. In 2015, The Reach opened Voices of the Valley, the permanent history exhibition, sharing stories of the significant events and individuals that shaped the present-day community. The Voices of the Valley exhibition was developed in conjunction with the Matsqui-Sumas-Abbotsford Museum Society, now Heritage Abbotsford Society, which operates Trethewey House Heritage Site. The Reach offers a robust annual schedule of events and programs that includes professional talks, panel discussions, classes, workshops, tours and special events.

In 2015, the Gallery relaunched their Young Contemporaries program changing the name to Emerge, a program for aspiring artists and arts professionals between the ages of 16 and 30. The program provides emerging talent from the Fraser Valley with the opportunity to develop professional skills, exhibit their work and learn from established professionals in a collaborative and supportive environment.

In 2016 The Reach was the recipient of a Governor General's History Award for Excellence in Community Programming for the permanent exhibit Voices of the Valley.

In 2018 The Reach received the Award of Merit-Excellence in Exhibitions from the BC Museums Association (BCMA), for the exhibition Grand Theft Terra Firma.

Also in 2018, The Reach celebrated its 10th anniversary with a public art program called Ramble: Art Outdoors.

== The Archives ==
The Reach is the base for the Abbotsford Archives. In 2010, they launched an online photo archive with an initial collection of 3000 images from time periods between the 1890s and the 1980s, and the online archive continued to grow.
