= San Barnard, Georgia =

Coordinates: 31°34′12.64″N 83°51′34.64″W

San Barnard is an extinct town in Worth County, in the U.S. state of Georgia.

== History ==
The community was named after Saint Bernard of Clairvaux (1090–1153), a French abbot, mystic, and reformer of the Cistercian order. A variant name was "Sanguinard".

San Barnard served as Worth County's county seat in the 1850s.
