= Dewsville, Georgia =

Ghost town in Baker County, Georgia

Coordinates: 31°20′17″N 84°31′42″W

Dewsville is an extinct town in Baker County, in the U.S. state of Georgia.

== History ==
William W. Dews, an early postmaster, gave the community his last name.

== See also ==
- Ghost town
- Cheevertown, Georgia
