= Greenbush, Georgia =

Extinct town in Walker County, Georgia, US

Coordinates: 34°38′9.30″N 85°11′30.83″W

Greenbush is an extinct town in Walker County, in the U.S. state of Georgia.

== History ==
A post office called "Green Bush" was established in 1856, and remained in operation until 1927. The community was named for a prominent green bush which grew at the original town site.
