= New Bridge, Georgia =

Coordinates: 34°25′52.35″N 83°58′19.57″W

New Bridge is an extinct town in Lumpkin County, in the U.S. state of Georgia.

== History ==
New Bridge was named for a nearby new bridge over the Chestatee River.
