= Visage, Georgia =

Coordinates: 34°55′48.33″N 83°40′1.61″W

Visage is an extinct town in Towns County, in the U.S. state of Georgia.

== History ==
A post office called Visage was established in 1875, and remained in operation until 1913. The community most likely was named after William Visage, a pioneer settler.
