= Broomtown, Georgia =

Broomtown
- Ghost town
- Location in Georgia Location in the United States
- Coordinates: 34°32′02″N 85°24′51″W
- Country: United States
- State: Georgia
- County: Chattooga

Broomtown is an extinct town in Chattooga County, in the U.S. state of Georgia.

== History ==
The community has the name of an Indian chieftain, "(Old) Broom".
