= Vancouver Island School of Art =

Art school in Victoria, Canada

Coordinates: 48.4366°N 123.3580°W

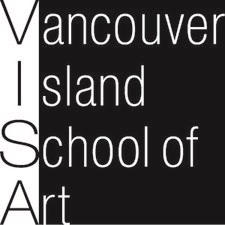
- Type: private art school
- Established: 2004
- Location: Victoria, British Columbia, Canada
- Executive Director: Wendy Welch
- Website: vancouverislandschoolart.com

The Vancouver Island School of Art (VISA) is a private, non-profit post-secondary art school founded in 2004 and located in Victoria, British Columbia, Canada. It is accredited by the Private Training Institutions Branch (PTIB) of the British Columbia Ministry of Advanced Education, Skills & Training and offers a PTIB-approved Certificate program in Visual Arts as well as individual courses and workshops.

== History ==
The school was founded in 2004 by the artist Wendy Welch who remains its executive director. Welch started VISA with just 47 students and four instructors. By 2018 it had taught over 3,500 part and full time students. For its first 14 years, the school was located at 2549 Quadra Street, a 1921 Arts and Crafts building on the Victoria Heritage Register. To mark its 10th anniversary, the school repainted the exterior in a design inspired by the dazzle camouflage used on ships in World War I.

VISA had originally offered a three-year Diploma of Fine Arts in addition to its Certificate of Visual Arts. The graduation of the first diploma students in 2008 was marked by Ambulator, a special exhibition at the school's Slide Room Gallery. The diploma was later accepted for transfer to the Bachelor in Fine Art degree program at the University of Gloucestershire in the UK. The school ceased accepting new students on the diploma program from March 2018 to concentrate on its certificate program and its individual courses and workshops.

The 2549 Quadra Street building was the site of the former Quadra Primary School and had been leased by the art school from School District 61 Greater Victoria. In 2017, the school district gave notice that it needed to reclaim the property for its education programs and that VISA would have to vacate the building by August 2018 when its lease ran out. VISA subsequently made plans to move into Ross Terrace, a mixed-use residential project on nearby Fifth Street planned for completion in 2020. For the interim period the school found a temporary home for its studios and workshops in the former North Park Bicycle Shop on 1725 Quadra Street and rented further classroom space in a building on Kings Road in Quadra Village.

== Slide Room Gallery ==
The Slide Room Gallery was originally located on the ground floor of the 2549 Quadra Street building and used by the school for slide presentations at art history lectures and visiting artist talks. It was opened as a gallery for exhibitions by both local artists and graduates of the school in 2006 and the following year was incorporated as a separate non-profit organization. In 2018 the gallery moved to the school's temporary location at 1725 Quadra Street.

== Programs ==
Vancouver Island School of Art is accredited by the Private Training Institutions Branch (PTIB) of the British Columbia Ministry of Advanced Education, Skills & Training. It is also on the Ministry's registry of Education Quality Assurance (EQA) designated institutions.

As of March 2018 VISA offers a PTIB-approved Certificate program in Visual Arts (one year full-time or a maximum of four years part-time) as well as individual courses and workshops. The Certificate in Visual Arts is transferable to the Bachelor of Fine Arts, Bachelor of Design, or Bachelor of Media Arts programs at Emily Carr University of Art and Design.
