= Cement, Georgia =

Defunct town in northwest Georgia

Coordinates: 34°15′40″N 84°57′18″W

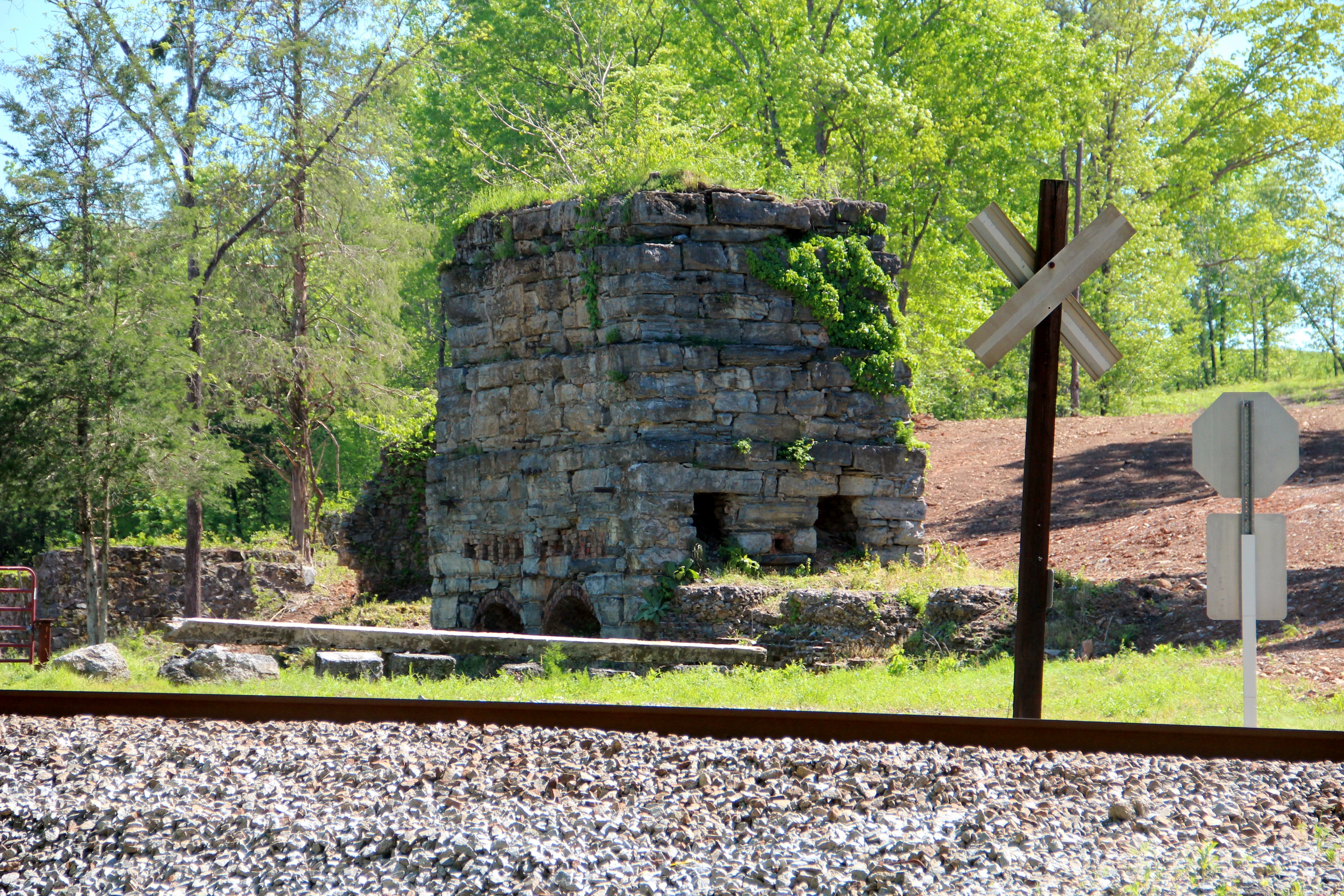
Ruins of Cement's furnace

Cement is an extinct town in Bartow County, in the U.S. state of Georgia. The community was about 2 miles (3.2 km) north of Kingston.

== History ==
The community was named for a hydraulic cement plant which operated at the site. A post office called Cement was established in 1880, and remained in operation until 1910. The Georgia General Assembly incorporated the place as the "Town of Cement" in 1891. The town's charter was officially repealed in 1995.
