= Falls City Construction Co. =

Defunct construction contracting firm of Kentucky, United States

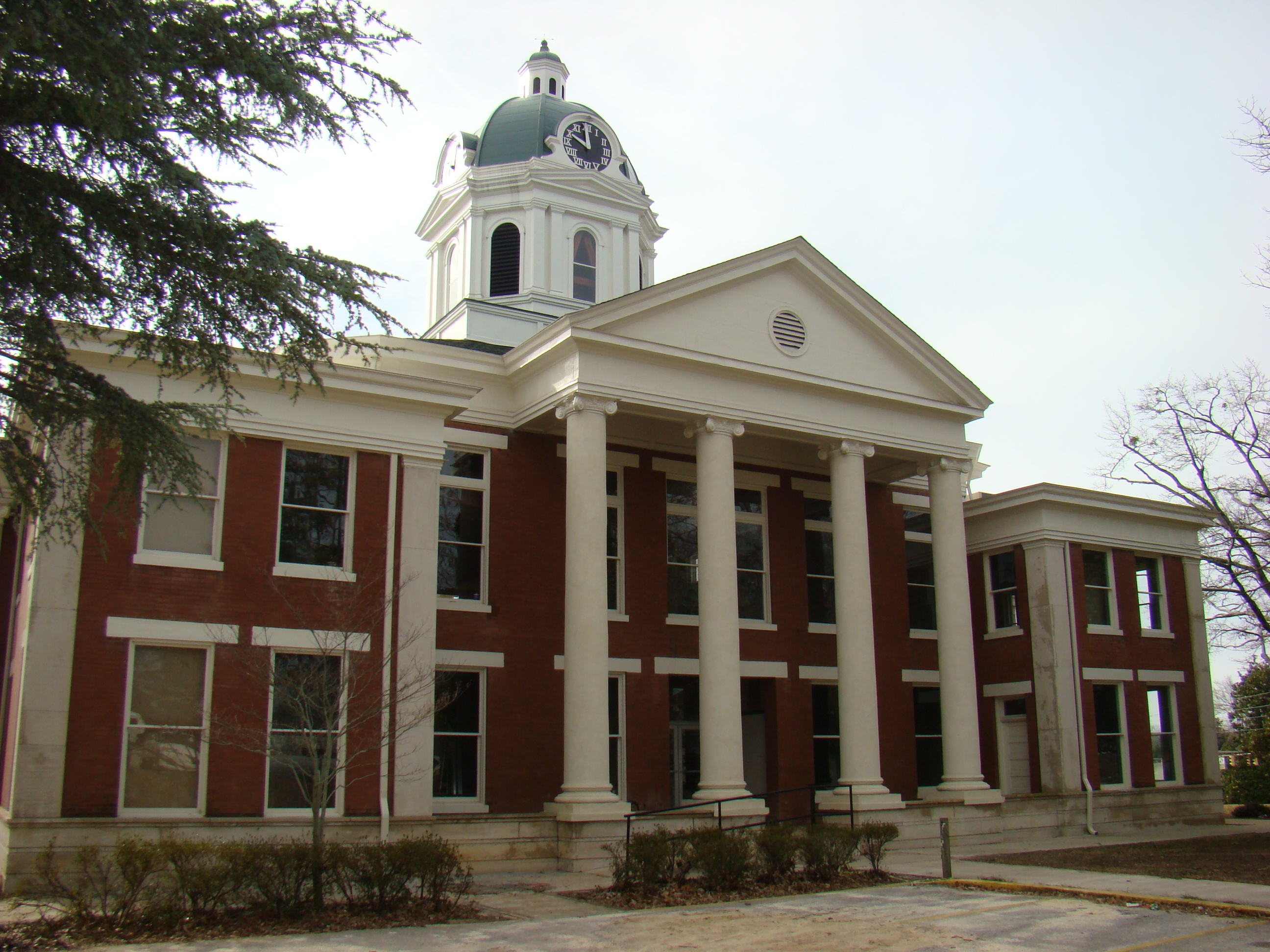
Stephens County Courthouse

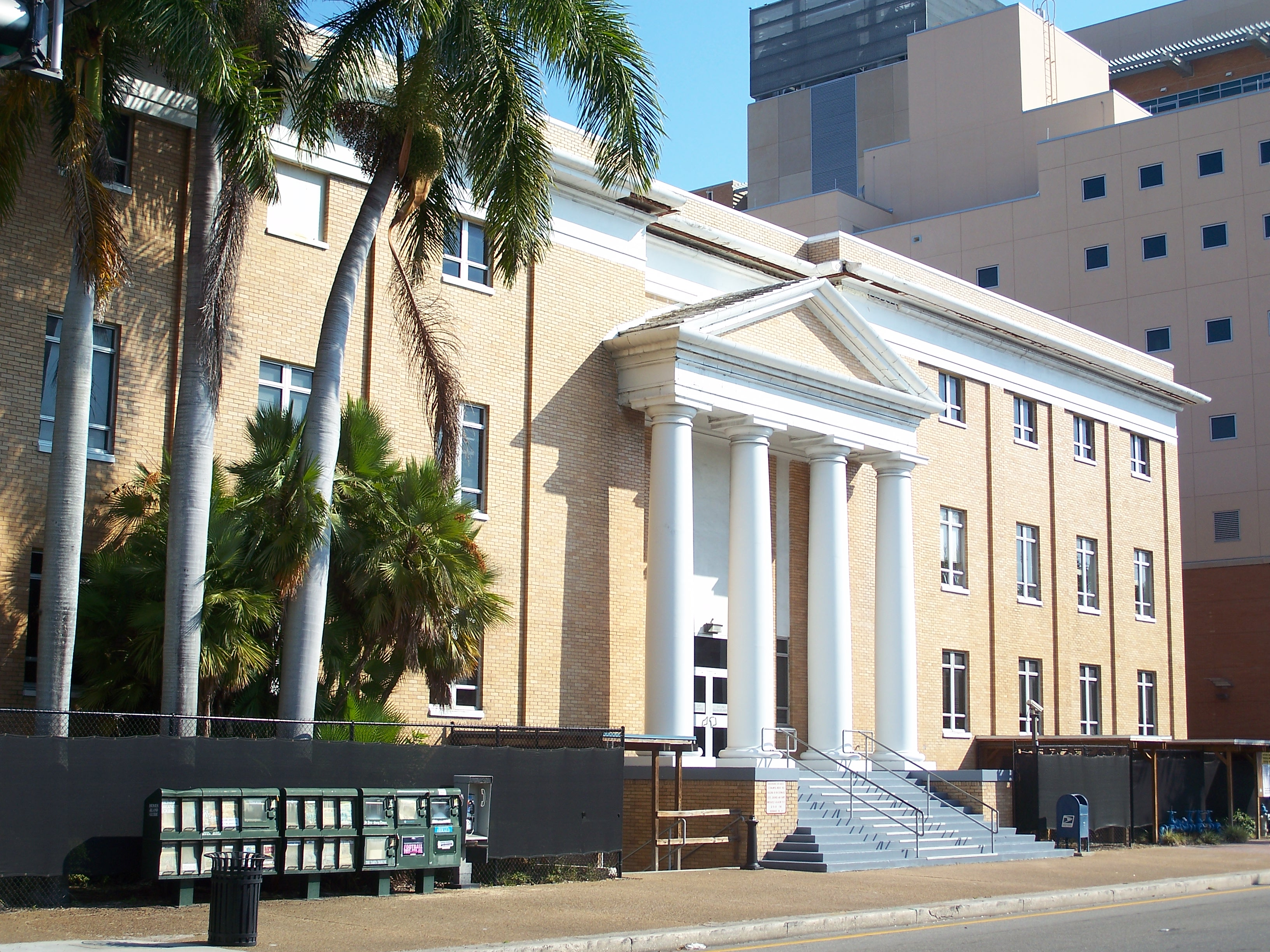
Manatee County Courthouse

Falls City Construction Co. was a construction contracting firm of Louisville, Kentucky.

A number of its works are listed on the National Register of Historic Places.

Works include:

- 1911 Kinney County Courthouse, 501 S. Ann St., Brackettville, Texas (Falls City Construction Co.), NRHP-listed
- Appling County Courthouse, Courthouse Sq., Baxley, GA (Falls City Construction Co.), NRHP-listed
- Chattooga County Courthouse, Courthouse Sq., Summerville, Georgia (Falls City Construction Co.), NRHP-listed
- Cleveland County Courthouse, Main, Washington, Warren, and Lafayette Sts., Shelby, North Carolina (Falls City Construction Co.), NRHP-listed
- Jeff Davis County Courthouse, bounded by Court St., Front St., Woodward Ave., and State St., Fort Davis, TX (Falls City Construction Co.), NRHP-listed
- Manatee County Courthouse, 1115 Manatee Ave. W, Bradenton, Florida (Falls City Construction), NRHP-listed
- Rains County Courthouse, 100 E Quitman St., Emory, Texas (Falls City Construction Co.), NRHP-listed
- Stephens County Courthouse, Courthouse Sq., Toccoa, Georgia (Falls City Construction Co.), NRHP-listed
- Warren County Courthouse, Courthouse Sq., Warrenton, Georgia (Falls City Construction Co.), NRHP-listed
