= Stephens County Courthouse (Georgia) =

- U.S. National Register of Historic Places
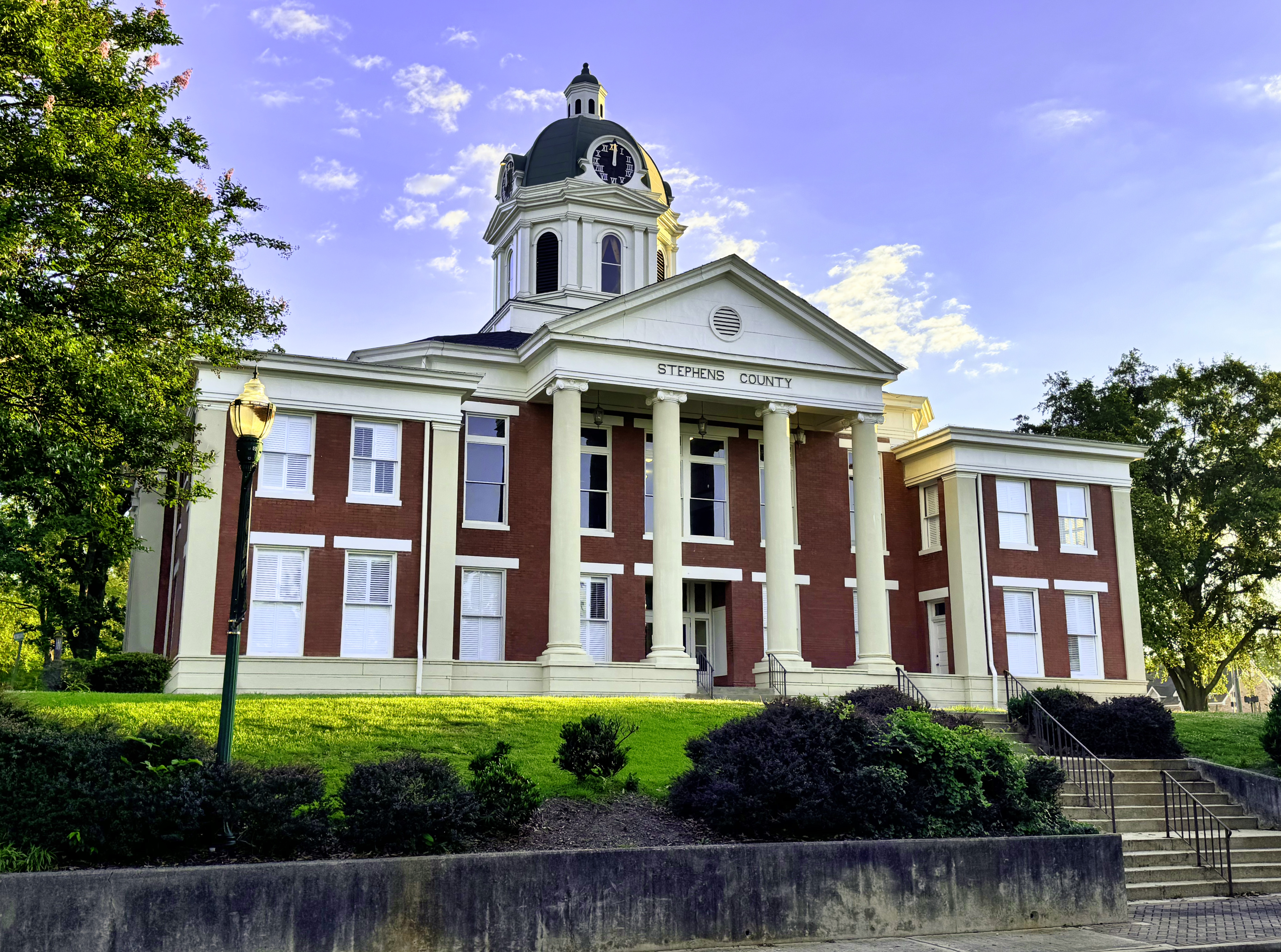
- Historic Stephens County courthouse

- Location within Georgia
- Location: Toccoa, Georgia
- Coordinates: 34°34′47″N 83°19′51″W
- Built: 1907
- Architect: Lewman, H.L.; Falls City Construction Co.
- Architectural style: Neoclassical
- MPS: Georgia County Courthouses TR
- NRHP reference No.: 80001232
- Added to NRHP: September 18, 1980

Stephens County Courthouse is a building in Toccoa, the county seat of Stephens County, Georgia, United States. It is the location of the county's trial courtrooms as well as that of other county government offices. The property was added to the National Register of Historic Places in 1980.

== History ==
Stephens County was formed in 1905 from parts of Habersham and Franklin Counties as Georgia's 143rd county. Toccoa was designated the county seat in the legislation creating Stephens County.

Stephens County's first courthouse was completed in 1908 and is still in use, but a new courthouse opened in May 2000 across the street (North Alexander Street) to the west from the first.

== Architecture ==
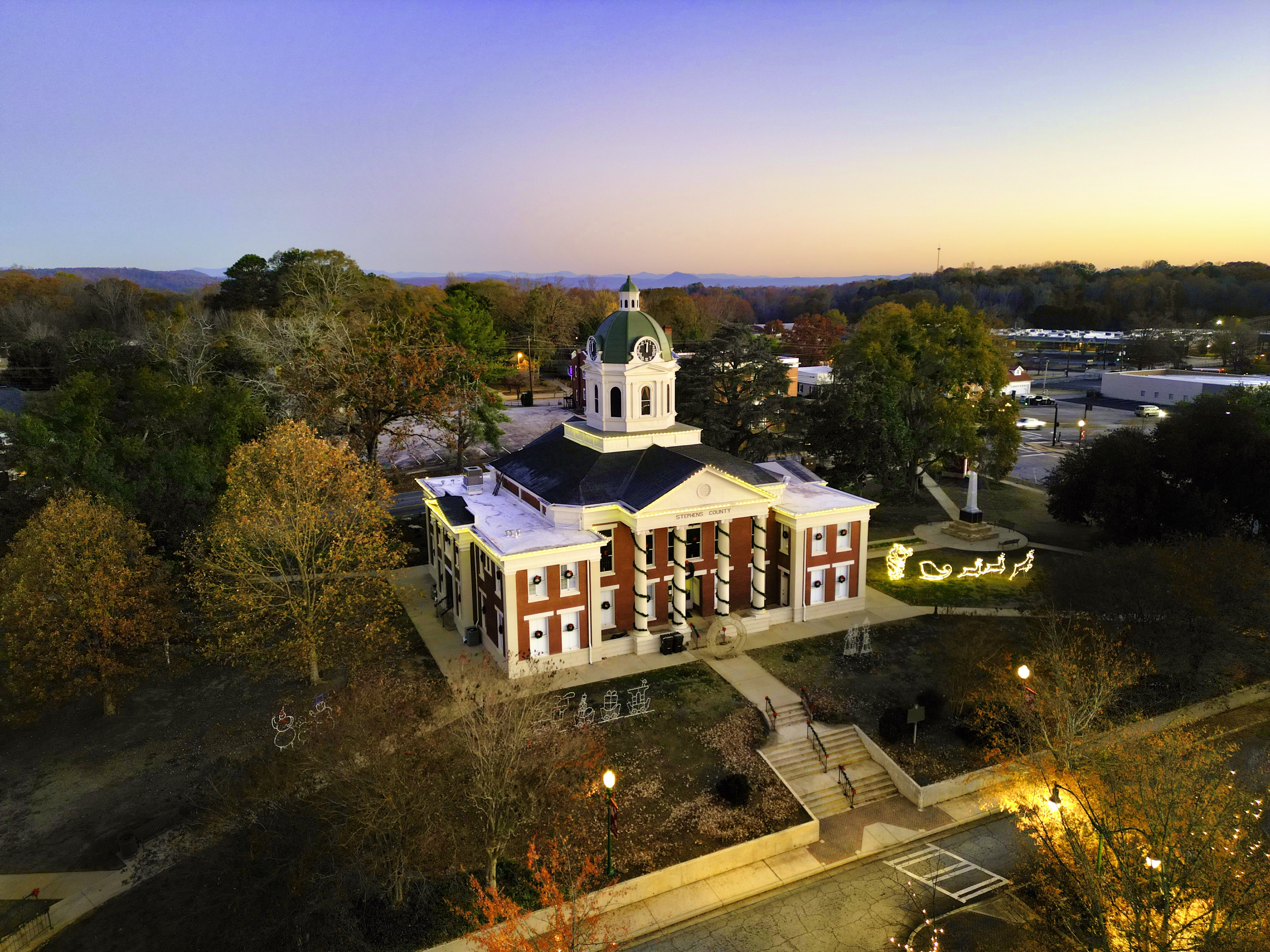
Aerial view of the Stephens County Courthouse

Constructed in the Classical Revival style, the two-story brick building features a clock tower.
