= J.R. Dick Dowdy Park =

Park in Summerville, Georgia, United States

Coordinates: 34°28′42″N 85°20′49″W

J.R. Dick Dowdy Park, known colloquially as Dowdy Park, is a park in Summerville, Georgia located on Highway 27. The park hosts many events throughout the year.

== Notable landmarks ==
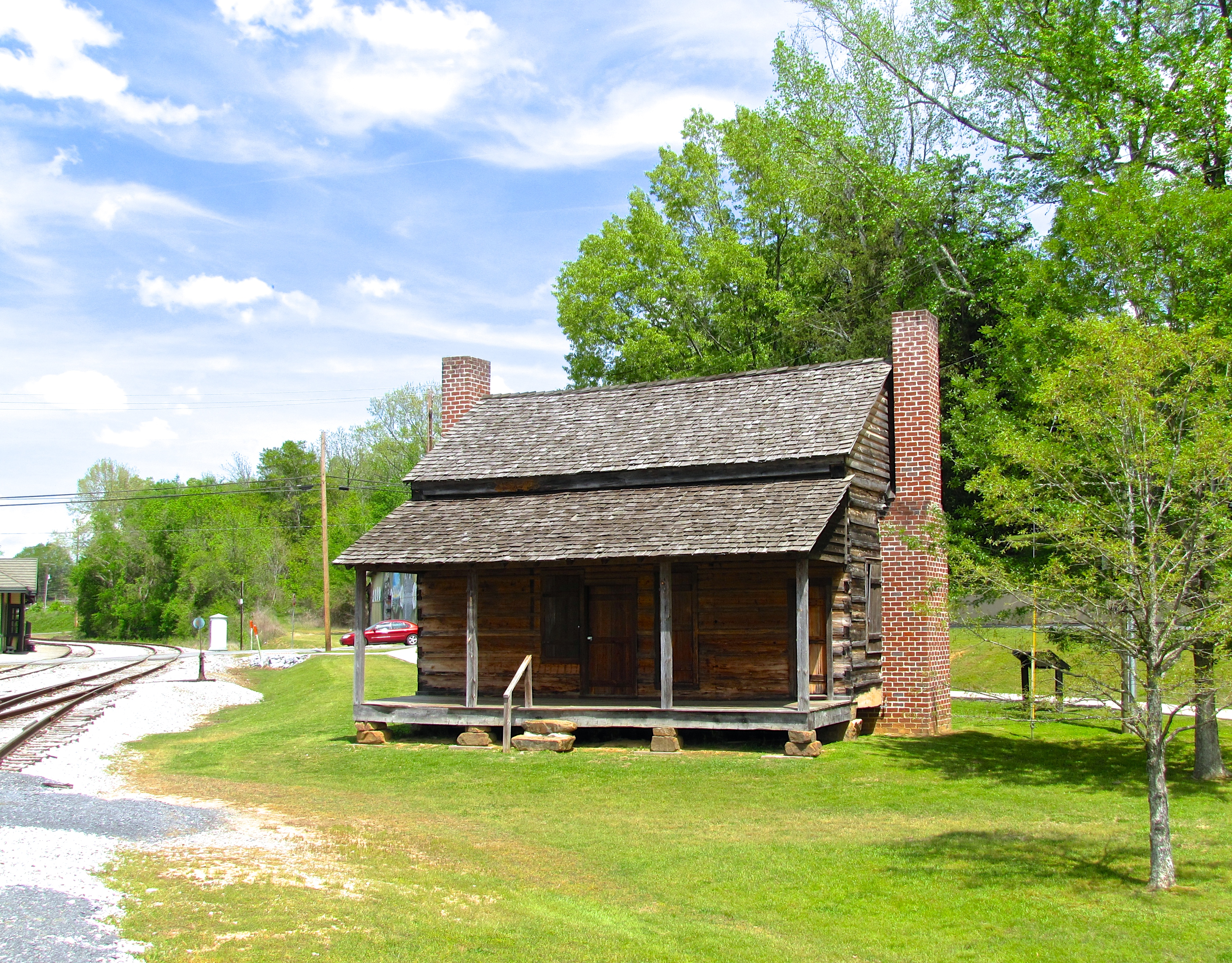
Couey House

The park is known for being the site of, or near, many historic landmarks. The Couey House is the oldest of the landmarks, having been built in the early 1840s by Andrew McSelland Couey and his sons. They were one of the first families to settle in Chattooga County. The house was originally made out of logs that were cleared from the land on which the house was built. However, Dowdy Park is not the original place where the house was built; it was moved there in the 1990s due to highway construction.

Dowdy Park is also notable for being near the Summerville railroad turntable and train depot. The depot was constructed in 1889 and added to the Georgia central railroad system in 1901. The depot was used in the filming of the film Warm Springs in 2005 and a TV miniseries adaptation of the novel Mama Flora's Family in 1998.

The park is also home to various statues, such as The Doughboy Statue, The Child Abuse Memorial Statue, and others.

== Annual events ==
Dowdy Park hosts many events annually.

- Relay For Life- This event is held annually on the fourth Friday and Saturday in May. It is the American Cancer Society's rally for cancer research.
- Sum-Nelly- An October celebration to welcome the fall season with locals showcasing and selling arts, crafts, and entertainment.
- Finster Fest- An event hosted by the Paradise Garden Foundation in May. It is an annual art and music festival. It has been held at Dowdy Park in the past, but is now often held at Paradise Garden itself.
- Chili & Stew Cook Off- A cooking competition in which contestants prepare various chilis and stews to be judged.
