= Cleveland County Courthouse (North Carolina) =

Historic courthouse in North Carolina, US

- Historic Cleveland County Courthouse
- U.S. National Register of Historic Places
- U.S. Historic district – Contributing property
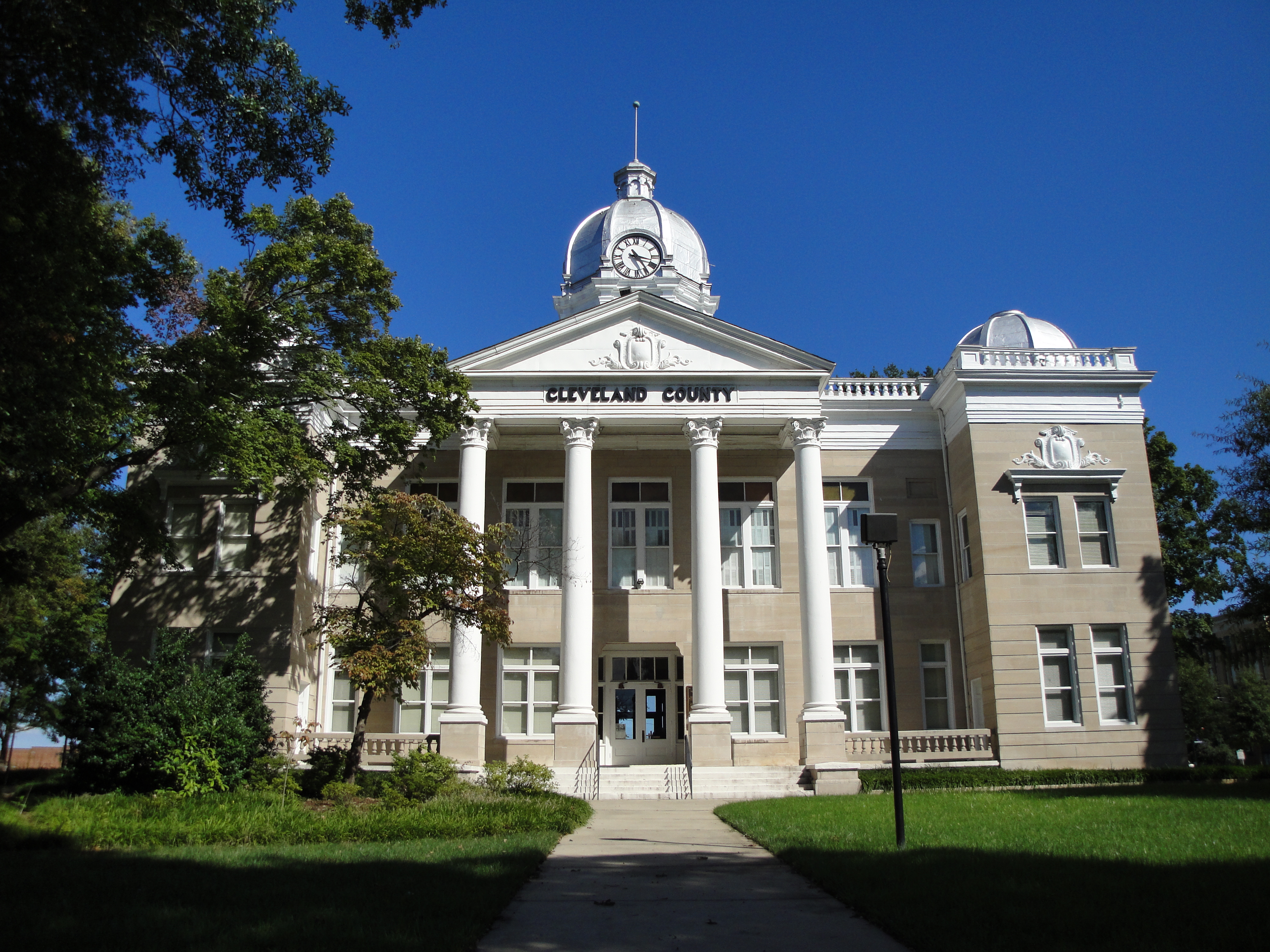
- Old Cleveland County Courthouse, September 2009

- Location within North Carolina Location within the United States
- Location: Main, Washington, Warren, and Lafayette Sts., Shelby, North Carolina
- Coordinates: 35°17′29″N 81°32′22″W
- Area: 1.8 acres (0.73 ha)
- Built: 1907
- Built by: Falls City Construction Co.
- Architect: Lewman, H.L.
- Architectural style: Classical Revival
- MPS: North Carolina County Courthouses TR
- NRHP reference No.: 79001693
- Added to NRHP: May 10, 1979

The Cleveland County Courthouse is a courthouse building located at Shelby, Cleveland County, North Carolina.

== History ==
The courthouse was built in 1907, and is a three-story, rectangular, Classical Revival-style building sheathed in a smooth ashlar veneer above a rusticated first floor. It features tetrastyle Corinthian order porticoes at each of the four entrances and a three-stage cupola atop the flat roof.

In 1916, Thomas Dixon, Jr., the author of The Clansman: A Historical Romance of the Ku Klux Klan, planned to erect a statue of his uncle Leroy McAfee on the courthouse square. The project was initially met with enthusiasm, until it was announced that Dixon wanted McAfee to wear a Ku Klux Klan mask in the statue.

Courthouse offices moved to a new building in 1974, and the old courthouse houses offices, and public meeting hall. It was also home to the Cleveland County Historical Museum, which closed in 2004 and became the Earl Scruggs Center in 2014 after extensive interior renovations.

It was listed on the National Register of Historic Places in 1979. It is located in the Central Shelby Historic District.

== Earl Scruggs Center ==
The courthouse is now home to the Earl Scruggs Center — "Music & Stories from the American South", which opened in 2014. The museum focuses on both the life of local musician Earl Scruggs, and the music, history and culture of the American South. The museum also hosts concerts and music lectures.

== See also ==
- List of music museums
