= Senorise Perry =

American football player and coach (born 1991)

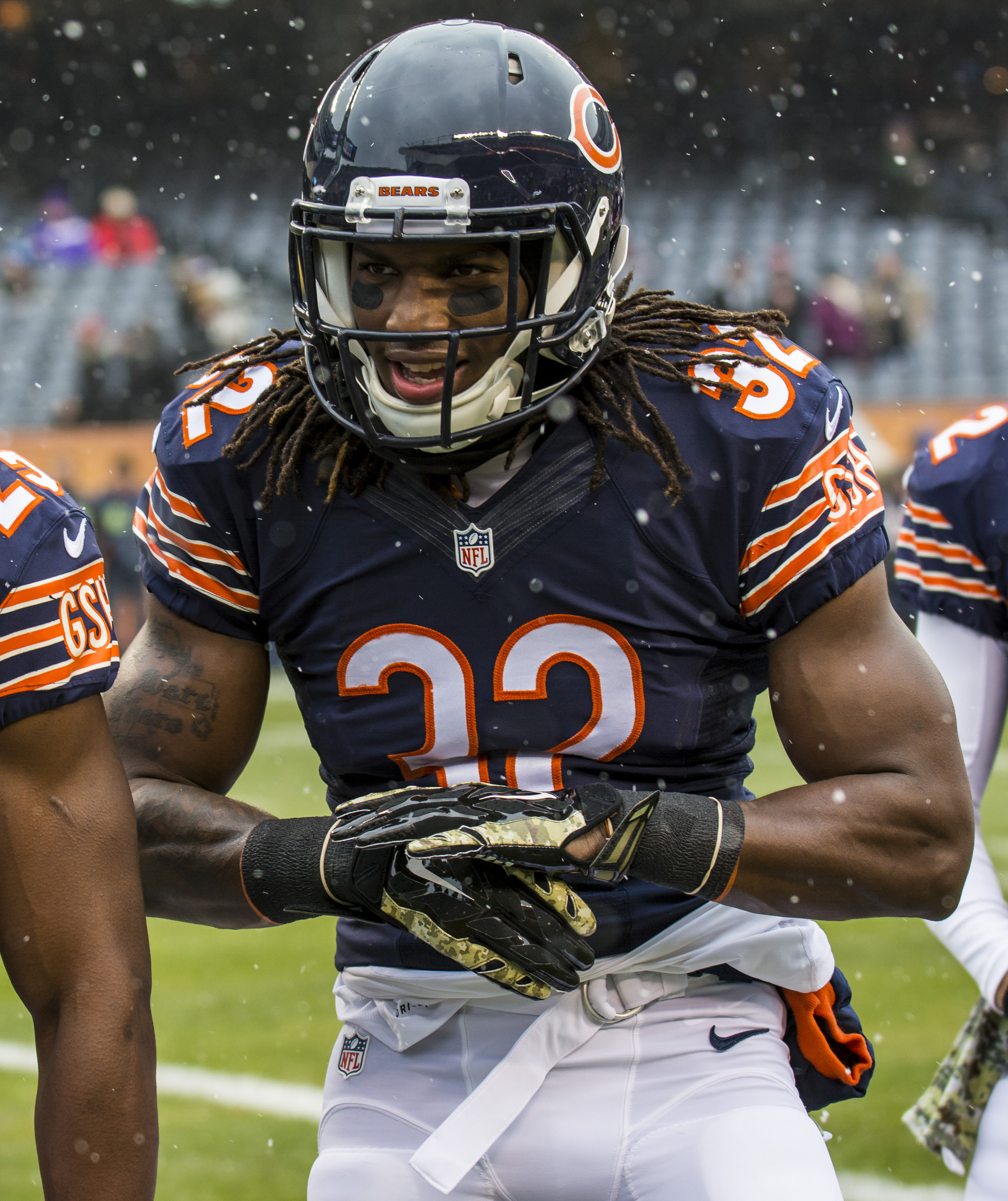
- Perry with the Chicago Bears in 2014

Wofford Terriers
- Title: Running backs coach

Personal information
- Born: September 19, 1991 (age 35); Summerville, Georgia, U.S.
- Listed height: 6 ft 0 in (1.83 m)
- Listed weight: 210 lb (95 kg)

Career information
- High school: Summerville (GA) Chattooga
- College: Louisville (2010–2013)
- NFL draft: 2014: undrafted

Career history

Playing
- Chicago Bears (2014–2016); Miami Dolphins (2016–2018); Buffalo Bills (2019); Tennessee Titans (2020)

Coaching
- Wofford (2023–present) Running backs coach

Career NFL statistics
- Rushing yards: 42
- Rushing average: 3.2
- Receptions: 3
- Receiving yards: 3
- Return yards: 456
- Stats at Pro Football Reference

Senorise Perry (born September 19, 1991) is an American former professional football running back and current college football coach. He is the running backs coach for Wofford College, a position he has held since 2023. He played college football at Louisville. He was signed by the Chicago Bears as an undrafted free agent in 2014 and has also played for the Miami Dolphins, Buffalo Bills, and Tennessee Titans.

== Early life ==
Perry attended and played high school football at Chattooga High School.

== College career ==
Perry played college football at the University of Louisville from 2010 to 2013 under head coach Charlie Strong. In the 2011 season, he had 12 carries for 27 rushing yards and a rushing touchdown. In the 2012 season, he had 705 rushing yards and 11 rushing touchdowns. In the 2013 season, he had 677 rushing yards and six rushing touchdowns. During his career, he rushed for 1,409 yards on 289 carries with 18 touchdowns.

== Professional career ==
=== Chicago Bears ===
On May 19, 2014, Perry was signed by the Chicago Bears after going undrafted in the 2014 NFL draft. In the 2014 season, Perry appeared on special teams in all 16 games, as well as having a team-high 17 special teams tackles and 2 forced fumbles on special teams.

On September 1, 2015, Perry was placed on injured reserve with a foot injury.

On August 28, 2016, Perry was waived by the Bears. He was later signed to the Bears' practice squad. On September 13, he was released from their practice squad.

=== Miami Dolphins ===
On October 13, 2016, Perry was signed to the Dolphins' practice squad. He signed a reserve/future contract with the Dolphins on January 10, 2017. In the 2017 season, he appeared in all 16 games and had eight carries for 30 rushing yards and a three-yard reception.

=== Buffalo Bills ===
On March 28, 2019, Perry signed with the Buffalo Bills. Perry is notable for being the first person to wear the jersey number 32 for the Bills since O. J. Simpson wore the number from 1969 to 1977 (the number had been unofficially retired from circulation since Simpson's retirement). He was placed on injured reserve with a quadriceps injury on August 31, and released from IR with an injury settlement on September 4. He was re-signed on October 8.

=== Tennessee Titans ===
On April 30, 2020, Perry was signed by the Tennessee Titans to a one-year contract. He was released on September 5, but was re-signed a day later. Perry was placed on injured reserve on September 23. He was activated on November 18. Perry finished the regular season with two rushes for nine yards and no touchdowns.

== Coaching career ==
In 2023, Perry was hired as the running backs coach for Wofford under head coach Shawn Watson.
