= Summerville Commercial Historic District =

Historic district in Georgia, United States

- U.S. National Register of Historic Places
- U.S. Historic district
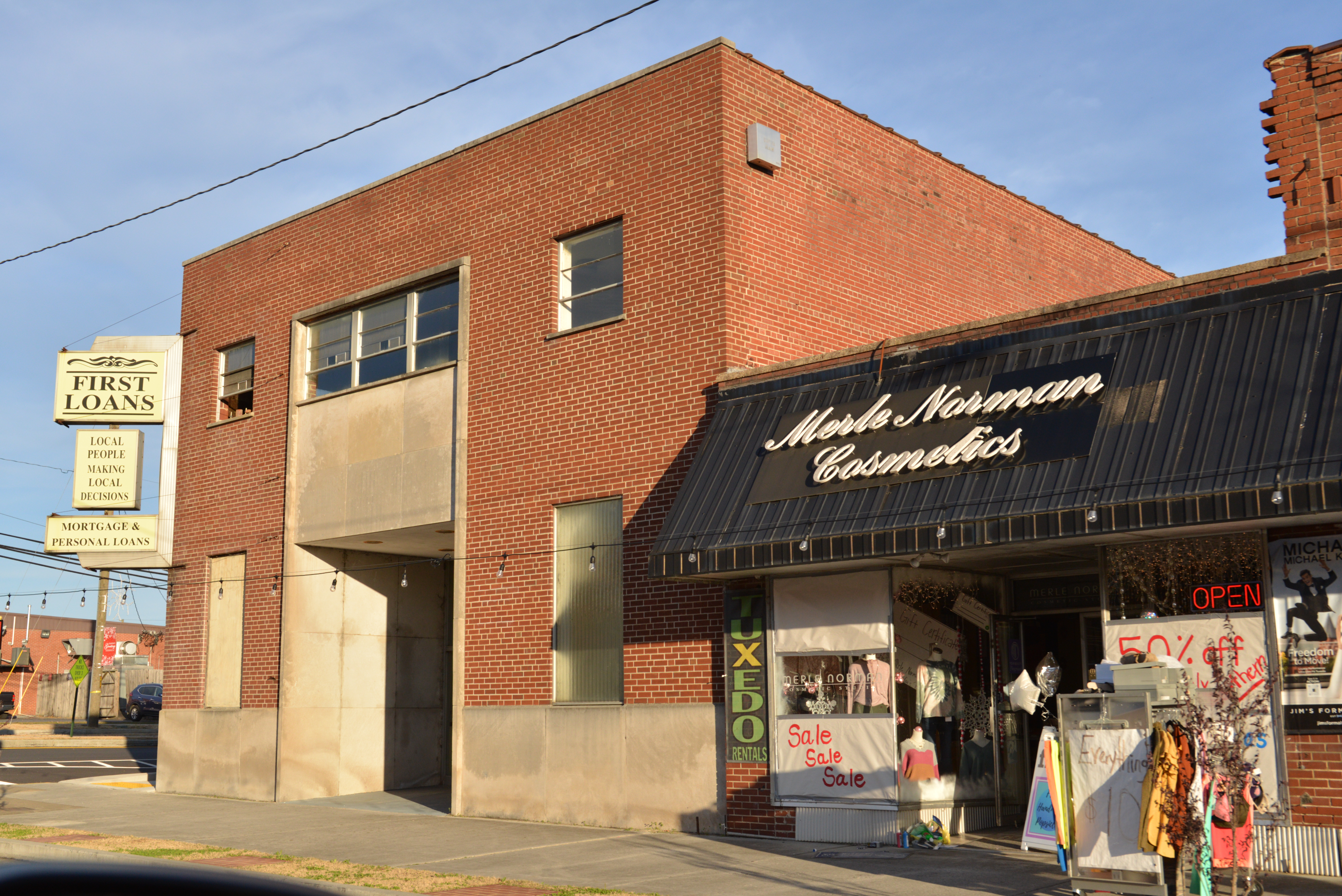

- Location within Georgia
- Location: Centered around Commerce St., Georgia, & Washington Aves., Summerville, Georgia
- Coordinates: 34°28′48″N 85°20′54″W
- NRHP reference No.: 12000280
- Added to NRHP: May 16, 2012

The Summerville Commercial Historic District in Summerville in Chattooga County, Georgia was listed on the National Register of Historic Places in 2012.

It covers about eight city blocks centered around Commerce Street, Georgia Avenue, and Washington Avenue in Summerville.

It includes buildings constructed from the 1890s into the 1950s, including:

- Chattooga County Courthouse (1909), Neoclassical Revival-style, separately listed on the National Register in 1980
- U.S. Post Office 1937 Colonial Revival-style
- Central of Georgia Railroad depot (1918). A significant commercial building is the large, two-story, corner building *Arrington" building (1894)
- two theaters
- Farmers and Merchants Bank building (1953), modern architecture.
- Jail and sheriff's office (1959)
