= Chattooga County School District =

School district in Georgia (U.S. state)

Address
- 33 Middle School Road Summerville, Georgia, 30747-0747; United States

District information
- Grades: Pre-school - 12
- Superintendent: Michelle Helie
- Accreditations: Southern Association of Colleges and Schools; Georgia Accrediting Commission
- NCES District ID: 1301080

Students and staff
- Enrollment: 2,834
- Faculty: 184

Other information
- Website: www.chattooga.k12.ga.us

The Chattooga County School District is a public school district in Chattooga County, Georgia, United States, based in Summerville. It serves the communities of Lyerly, Menlo, Summerville, and Trion.

Beginning in the 2010-2011 school year the district began holding school for four days per week instead of five. As a result, each school day is longer. The district saved $800,000 in its first year of four-day-per-week operations. In 2019, the school district ended their four-day school week policy, due to the school district's low test scores.

== Schools ==
The Chattooga County School District has four elementary schools, one middle school, and one high school.

=== Elementary schools ===
- Leroy Massey Elementary School
- Lyerly Elementary School
- Menlo Elementary School
- Summerville Elementary School

=== Middle school ===
- Summerville Middle School

=== High school ===
- Chattooga High School
