= Central Shelby Historic District =

Historic district in North Carolina, United States

- U.S. National Register of Historic Places
- U.S. Historic district
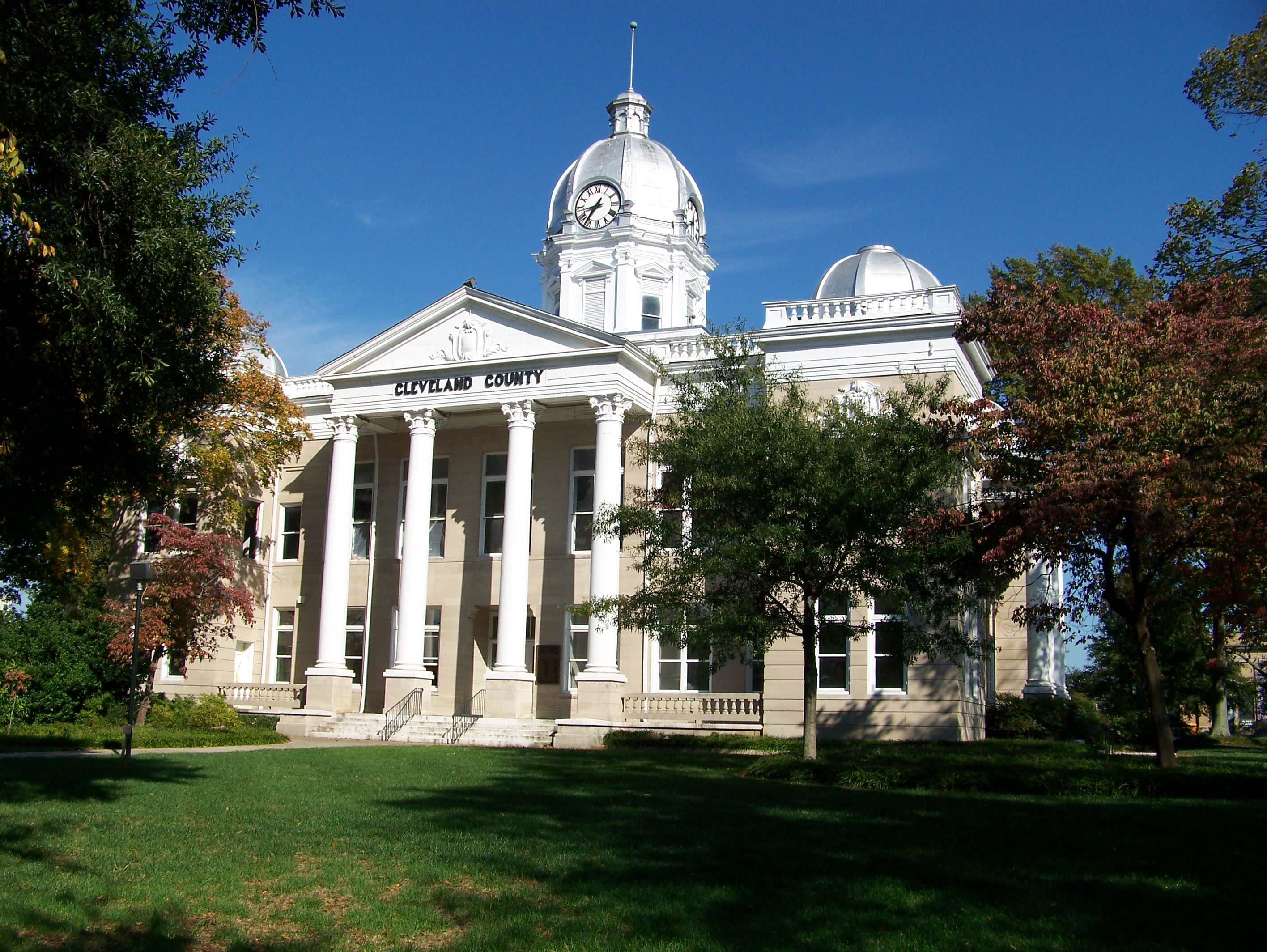
- Former Cleveland County Courthouse

- Location within North Carolina Location within the United States
- Location: Roughly Washington St. from Gidney to Sumter;Graham and Warren St to Morgan;and Marion St.from Washington St to Thompson; also roughly bounded by E. Elm, S. Lafayette, Blanton, N. Thompson, W. Sumter, N. Lafayette, Kendal, and S. Dekalb Sts. Shelby, North Carolina
- Coordinates: 35°17′17″N 81°32′33″W
- Area: 170.5 acres (69.0 ha)
- Architect: Multiple
- Architectural style: Colonial Revival, Bungalow/craftsman
- NRHP reference No.: 83001841, 02000963 (Boundary Increase)
- Added to NRHP: June 23, 1983, September 14, 2002 (Boundary Increase)

Central Shelby Historic District is a national historic district located at Shelby, Cleveland County, North Carolina. It encompasses 229 contributing buildings in the central business district and surrounding residential areas of Shelby. The district is centered on the Cleveland County Courthouse (1907) and public square, established in 1841. The district includes representative examples of Colonial Revival and Bungalow / American Craftsman architectural styles. The district includes the separately listed courthouse, Masonic Temple Building, and Webbley. Other notable buildings include the Webb House, Wells House, Fulenwider-Ebeltoft House, Dr. S. S. Royster House, Bateman House, Washburn Block, city hall and firehouse (1911), Royster Building (1910), First Baptist Church, Ascension Lutheran Church (1932), and Southern Railway Freight Depot (c. 1920).

It was listed on the National Register of Historic Places in 1983, with a boundary increase in 2002.

== Photos ==
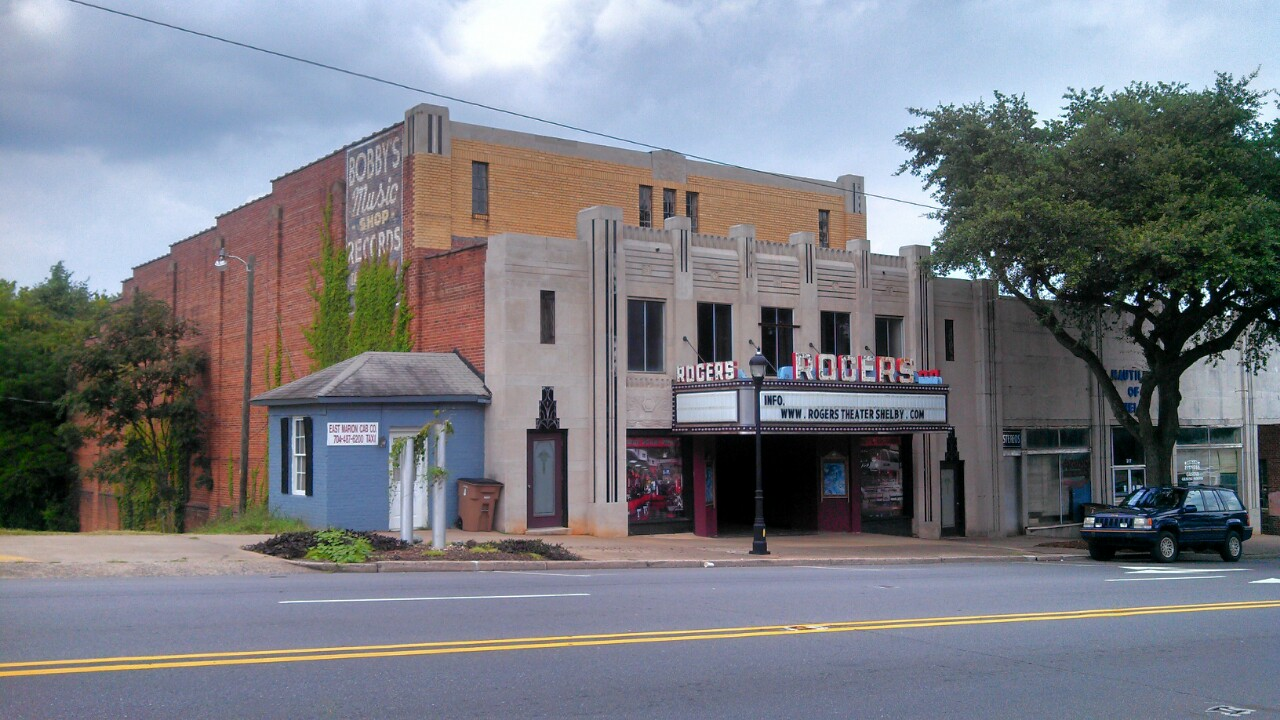
Rogers Theater

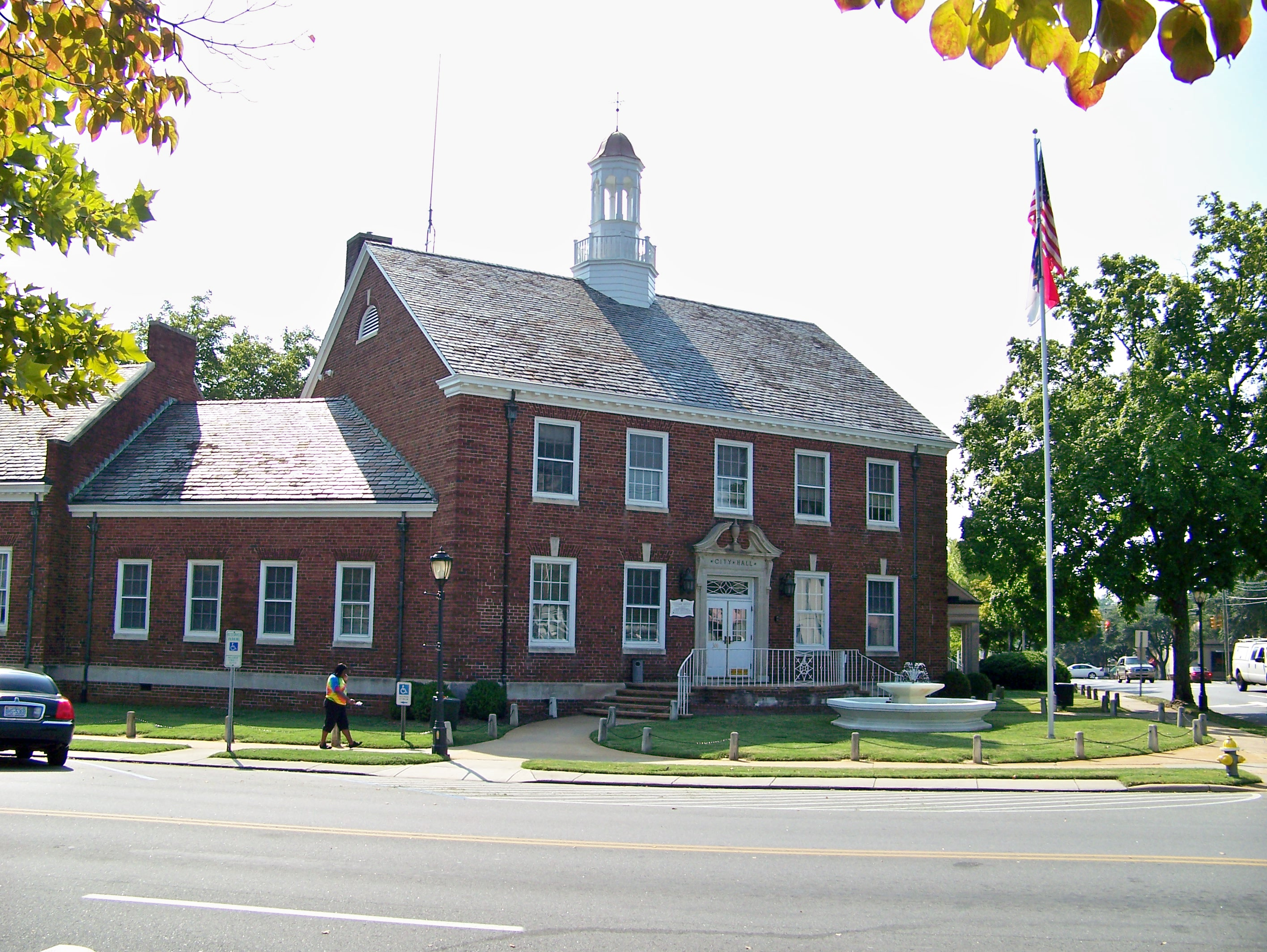
Shelby City Hall

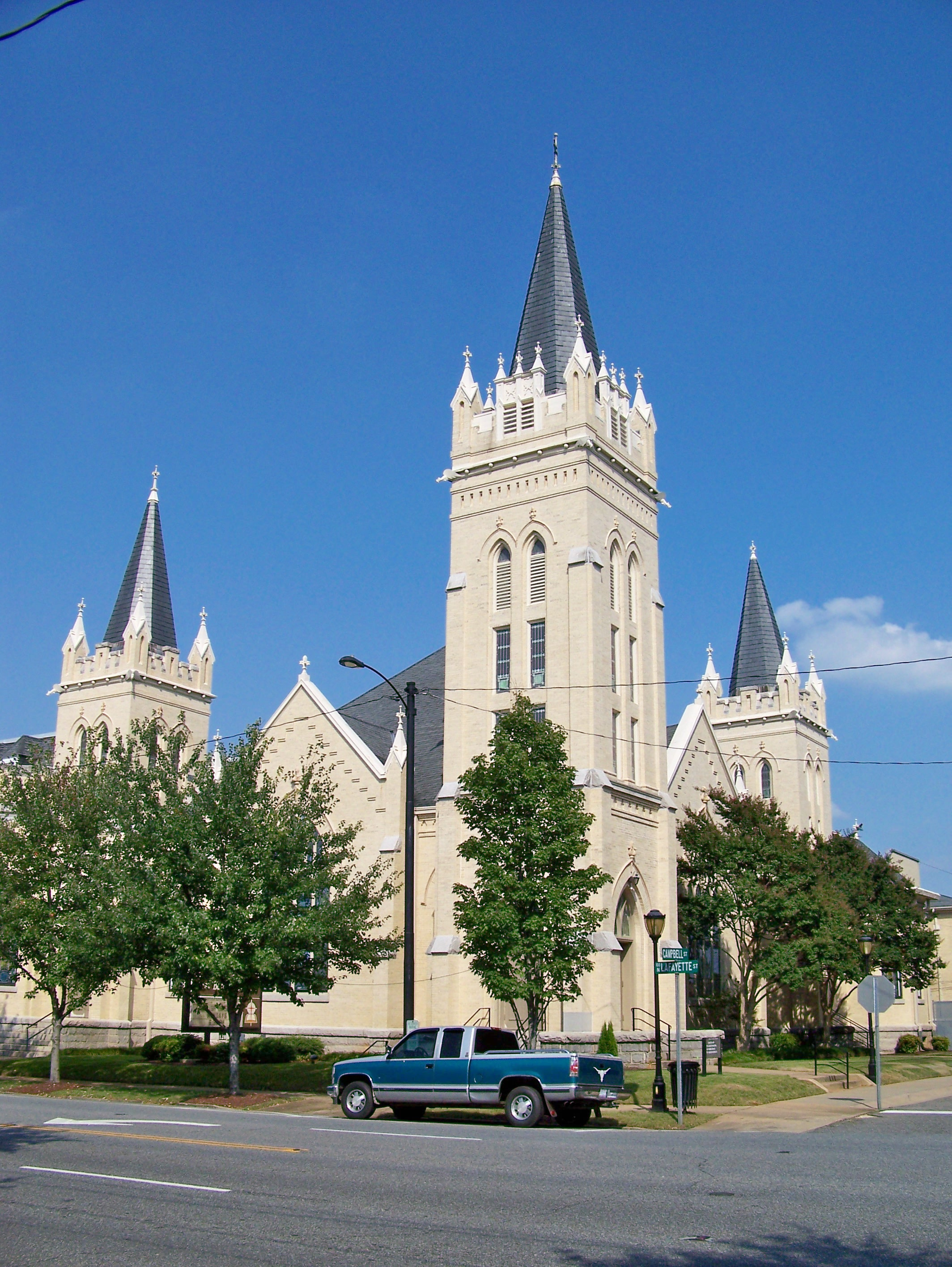
Shelby First Baptist Church

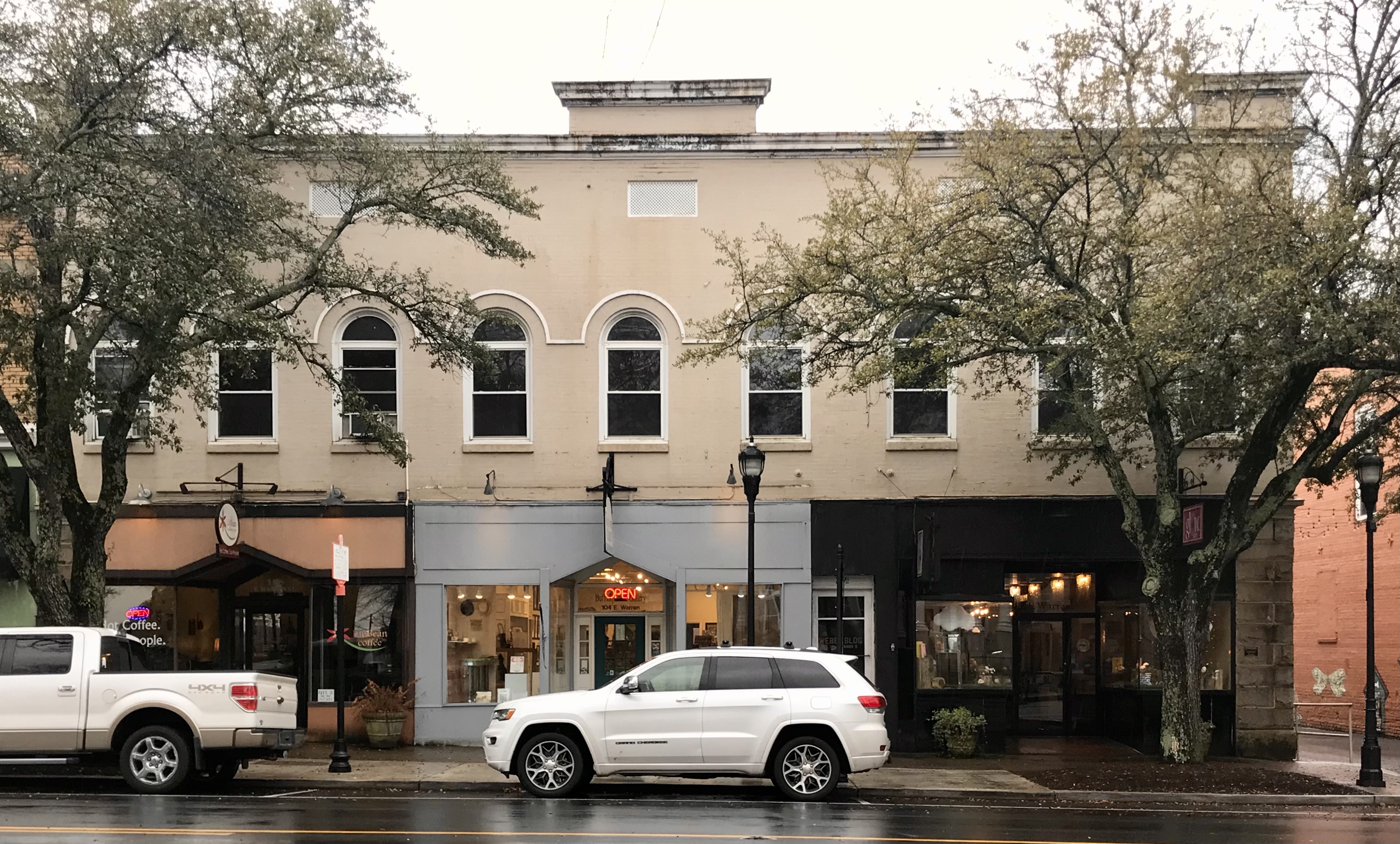
Gardner-Webb Building

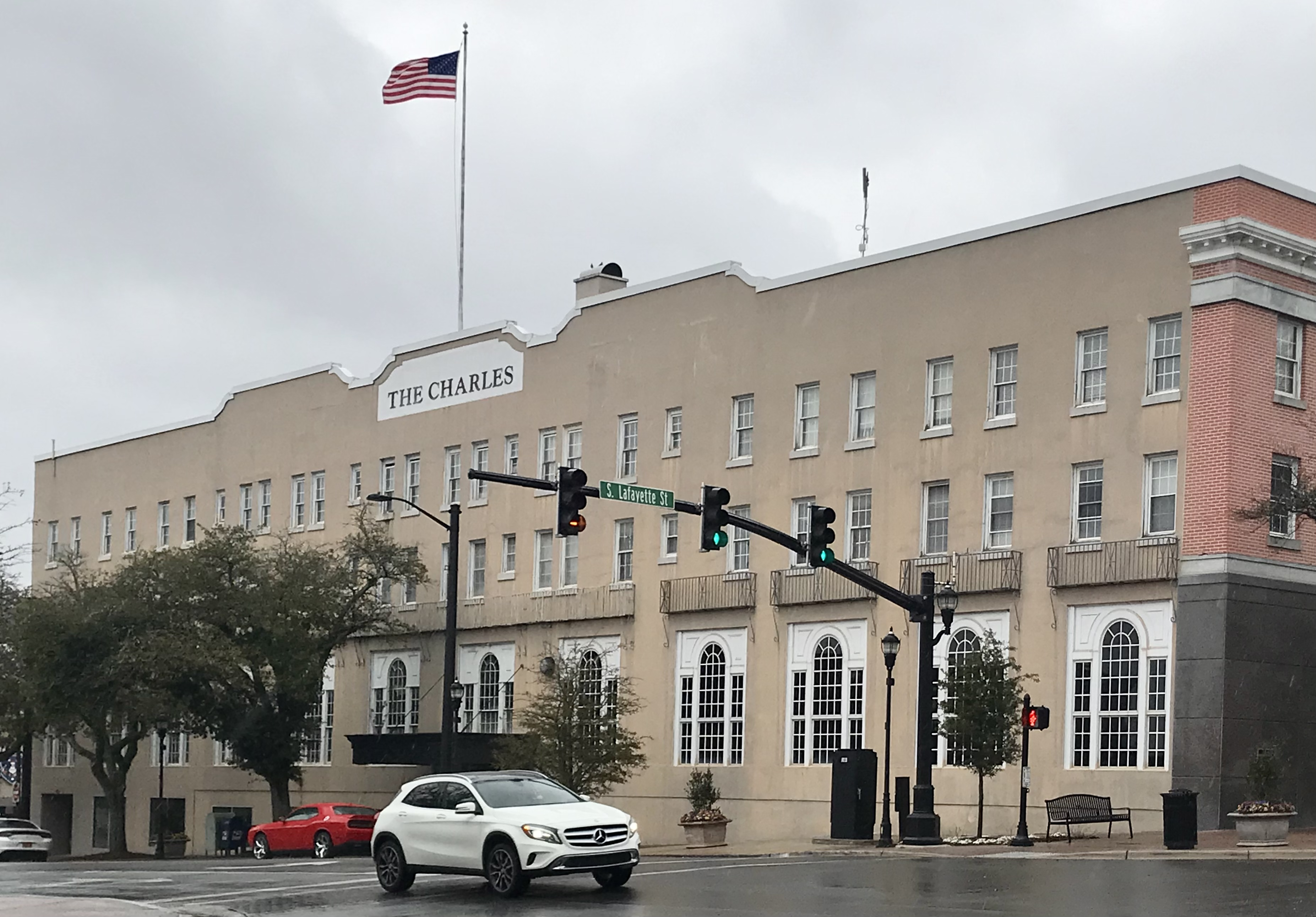
Hotel Charles
