= Builders Exchange Building =

Builders Exchange Building may refer to:

- Builders Exchange Building (Santa Ana, California), listed on the National Register of Historic Places in Orange County, California
- Builders Exchange Building (San Antonio, Texas), listed on the National Register of Historic Places in Bexar County, Texas
