= Manatee County Courthouse (disambiguation) =

Manatee County courthouse{s} may refer to:

- Old Manatee County Courthouse, Bradenton, Florida, the first courthouse
- Manatee County Courthouse, (Pine Level, Florida) (now in DeSoto County, Florida), the second courthouse, (destroyed)
- Manatee County Courthouse, Bradenton, Florida, the third and present courthouse
