= Builders' Exchange =

A Builders' Exchange is a type of building industry association. The exchanges have had an important role in the building and architecture trades in North America. There are several Builders Exchange Buildings as well as notable Builders Exchanges.

There are Builders Exchanges located throughout the United States and Canada.

A Builders’ Exchange is a trade association or privately owned business that provides services and “exchanges” information among contractors, subcontractors, suppliers, design firms, construction clients and others involved in the local construction industry. Builders’ Exchanges share a common purpose of collecting and disseminating construction bidding information via a physical and/or electronic plan room. Builders’ Exchanges represent a collection of construction-related firms or members within a local region who pay annual dues to belong to the collective, and receive the services it provides.

Builders' Exchanges exist to provide tangible services at the local level, specifically collecting and disseminating construction bidding information via physical and/or electronic plan room.

Each organization operates independently without direct obligation to or oversight by, a state or national governing body.

Exchanges may voluntarily collaborate through a non-binding federation called the Builders Exchange Network.
