= Old Manatee County Courthouse =

- U.S. National Register of Historic Places
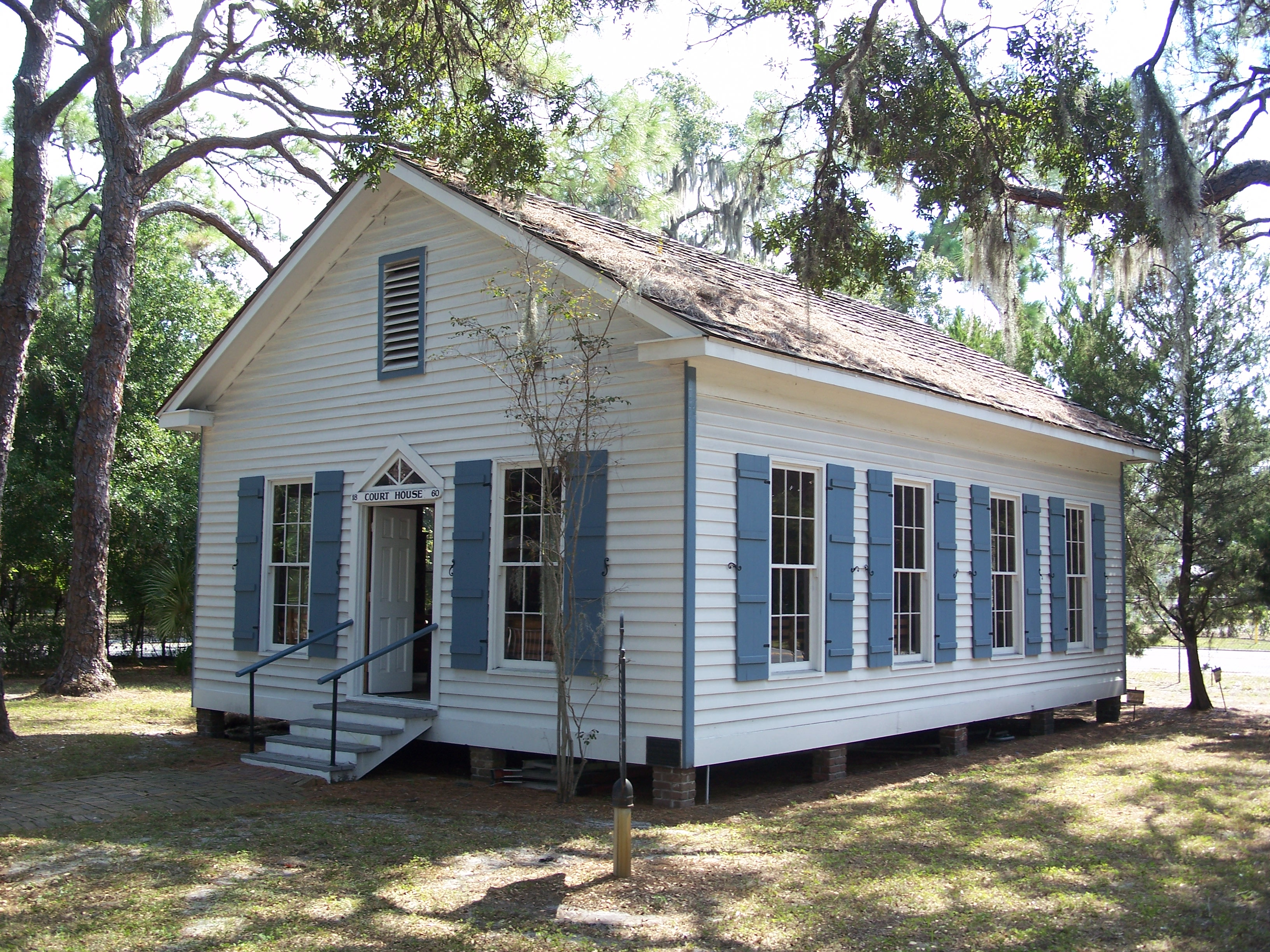

- Location within Manatee County
- Location: Bradenton, Florida
- Coordinates: 27°29′39″N 82°32′52″W
- Built: 1860
- Architect: Ezekiel Glazier
- NRHP reference No.: 76000601
- Added to NRHP: June 29, 1976

The Old Manatee County Courthouse, built in 1859–1860, is an historic building located at 1404 Manatee Avenue East, in Bradenton, Florida. It was Manatee County's first courthouse and is the oldest surviving Florida county courthouse (that was built originally as one) left in the state, and is now part of the Manatee Village Historical Park. On June 29, 1976, it was added to the U.S. National Register of Historic Places. After it ceased being used as a courthouse, it became the Manatee Methodist Church and the Manatee Methodist Church Parsonage.

== See also ==
- Manatee County courthouses (disambiguation)
