= Manatee County Courthouse =

- U.S. National Register of Historic Places
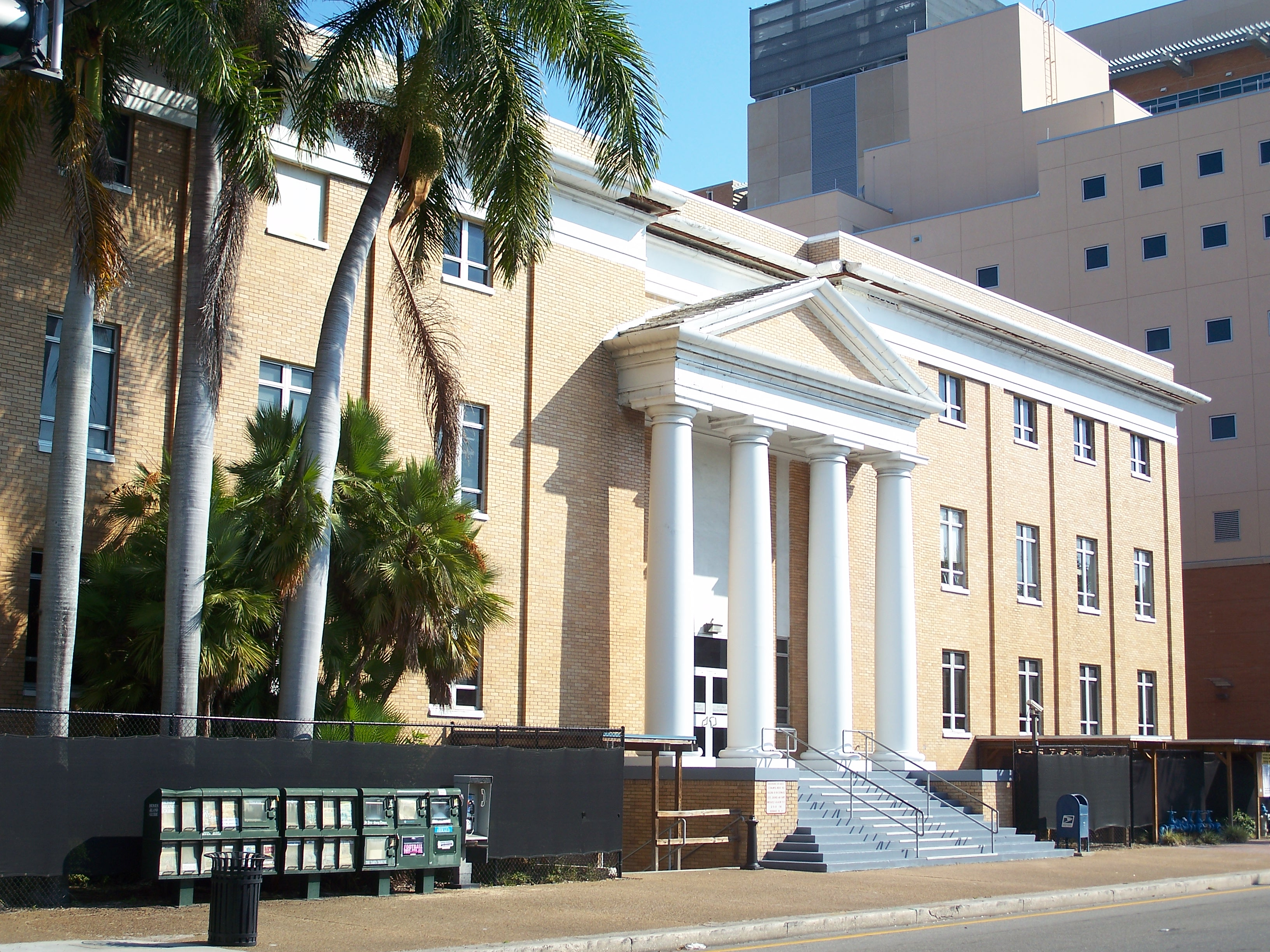

- Location within Florida Location within the United States
- Interactive map showing the location of Manatee County Courthouse
- Location: 1115 Manatee Avenue, West, Bradenton, Florida
- Coordinates: 27°29′39″N 82°34′23″W
- Built: 1913
- Built by: Falls City Construction
- Architect: McGucken & Hyer
- Architectural style: Classical Revival
- NRHP reference No.: 98000676
- Added to NRHP: June 11, 1998

The Manatee County Courthouse is a historic courthouse building located at 1115 Manatee Avenue West, in Bradenton, Florida. On June 11, 1998, it was added to the National Register of Historic Places.

== History ==
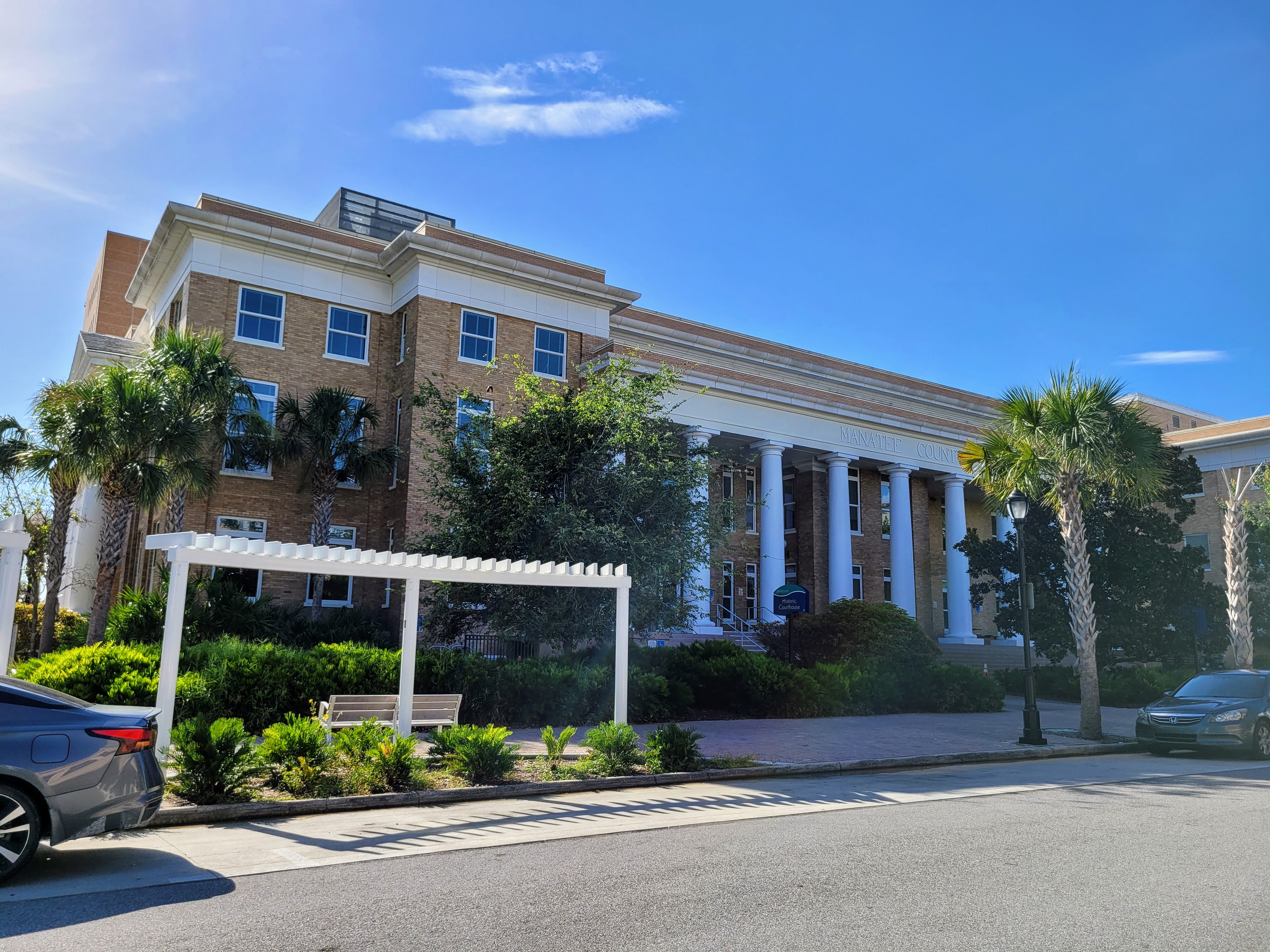
Manatee County Courthouse viewed from 12th Street West

The courthouse was built in 1912 by the Falls City Construction Company and has a neo-classical architectural style. The building was designed to house all county offices, courtrooms, meeting rooms and the county jail. There were additions made to the building in 1927 and 1966. The courthouse initially had a dome that was removed in 1925 because it was a fire hazard.

The building serves the office for the Manatee County Clerk of Circuit Court & Comptroller.

== See also ==
- Manatee County courthouses (disambiguation)
