= Masonic Temple Building (Shelby, North Carolina) =

Historic building in North Carolina, US

- U.S. National Register of Historic Places
- U.S. Historic district – Contributing property
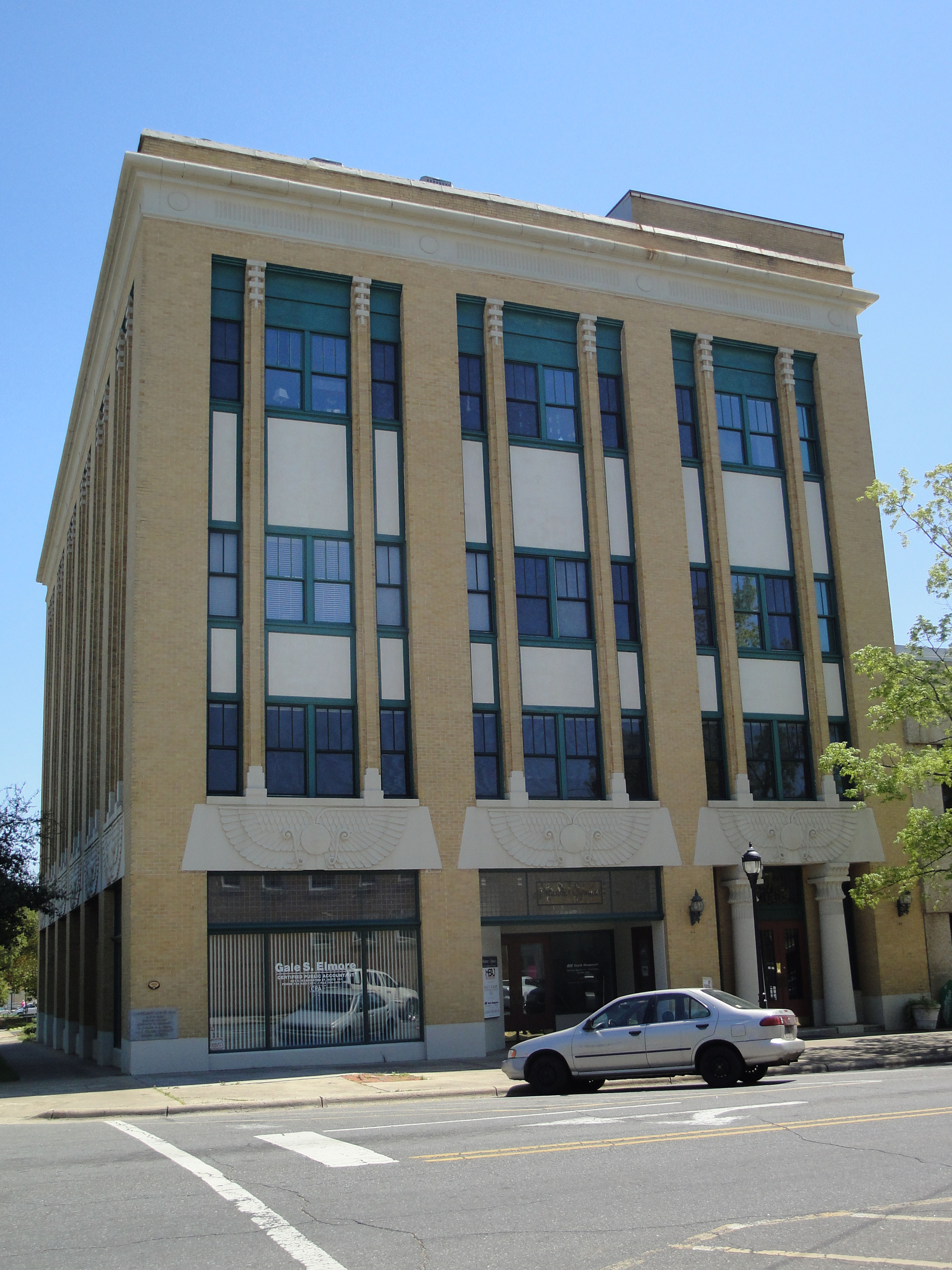
- Masonic Temple Building, April 2011

- Location within North Carolina Location within the United States
- Location: 201 S. Washington St., Shelby, North Carolina
- Coordinates: 35°16′54″N 81°32′18″W
- Area: less than one acre
- Built: 1924-1925
- Built by: J. P. Little and Son
- Architectural style: Exotic Revival, Egyptian Revival
- NRHP reference No.: 82003446
- Added to NRHP: July 15, 1982

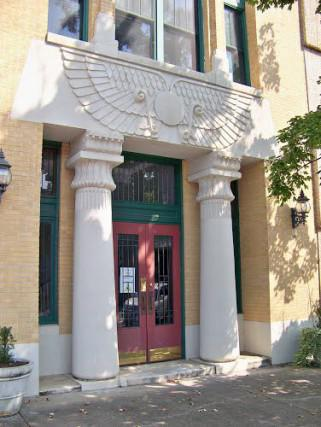
Entrance

The Masonic Temple is a historic Masonic Lodge and office building located at Shelby, Cleveland County, North Carolina. It was built in 1924–1925, and is a four-story, rectangular, brushed brick building. It is in the Egyptian Revival style with massive concrete lintels at the first story, robust lotiform pillars at the building's principal entrance, and a richly ornamented cornice frieze. It was commissioned by the Cleveland Lodge of the Ancient, Free, and Accepted Masons of North Carolina. Today, no Masonic lodges meet in the building.

It was listed on the National Register of Historic Places in 1982. It is located in the Central Shelby Historic District.
