= Chattooga High School =

Public high school in Summerville, Georgia, United States

Chattooga County High School

Location
- 989 Highway 114; Summerville, Georgia, (Chattooga County) 30747-1595; United States; 34.5586°N 85.1715°W

Information
- School type: Public
- Motto: “Expect Success”
- School district: Chattooga County School District
- Principal: Roger Wilkinson
- Teaching staff: 49.00 FTE
- Grades: 9 - 12
- Enrollment: 760 (2023–2024)
- Student to teacher ratio: 15.51
- Colors: Red and black
- Slogan: "One Tribe"
- Mascot: Indian
- Team name: Indians
- Newspaper: Indian Lore
- Website: Official website

Chattooga High School (CHS / Chattooga County High School) is a public high school in the city of Summerville, Georgia, United States. It is located in Chattooga County, in the northwest portion of the state, and enrolls 750 students. It is a part of Chattooga County School District.

Beginning in the 2010–2011 school year the district began holding school on four days per week instead of five in all of its schools, including Chattooga High. As a result, each school day is longer. The district saved $800,000 in its first year of four-day-per-week operations. In 2019, the school district ended their four-day school week policy, due to the school district's low test scores. Shortly afterwards, however, the reinstated their four-day-per-week policy after many community and student protests.

== History ==
In 1964, the Menlo, Lyerly, and Summerville high schools combined into Chattooga High School. Summerville High School was built across from J.R. "Dick" Dowdy Park. The gym/field house, which was 120 yards from the main school, was built a few years after the main school house. The combined Chattooga High School building opened for the 1966–1967 school year. Shortly after implementing the four-day school week, the Chattooga Board of Education approved plans for the construction of a new Chattooga High School building. Construction began in 2013 with the site located adjacent to the original building. The original building was demolished following the graduation of the class of 2015. The new Chattooga High School building was completed the next summer, in time for the start of the 2015–2016 school year. In addition to the new school building, renovations were made to the Little Big Horn Stadium and construction is currently under way on a new softball field and football practice field.
