= Howard Finster =

American artist

- Born: December 2, 1916; Valley Head, Alabama
- Died: October 22, 2001 (aged 84); Rome, Georgia
- Movement: Folk art, Outsider art

Howard Finster (December 2, 1916 – October 22, 2001) was an American artist and Baptist minister from Georgia. He claimed to be inspired by God to spread the gospel through the design of his swampy land into Paradise Garden, a folk art sculpture garden with over 46,000 pieces of art. His creations include outsider art, naïve art, and visionary art. Finster came to widespread notice in the 1980s with his album cover designs for R.E.M. and Talking Heads.

== Artistic works ==
Finster began building his first garden park museum in Trion, Georgia, in the late 1940s. It featured an exhibit on the inventions of mankind in which Finster planned to display one of everything that had ever been invented, models of houses and churches, a pigeon flock and a duck pond.

When he ran out of land in Trion in 1961, he moved to Pennville, Georgia, near Summerville, and bought four acres (1.6 ha) of land upon which to build the Plant Farm Museum "to show all the wonderful things o' God's Creation, kinda like the Garden of Eden." It features such attractions as the "Bible House," "the Mirror House," "the Hubcap Tower," "the Bicycle Tower," "the Machine Gun Nest," and the largest structure in the garden, the five-story "Folk Art Chapel." He also started putting up signs with Bible verses on them because "he felt that they stuck in people's heads better that way."

He retired from preaching in 1965 and focused all of his time on improving the Plant Farm Museum. In 1976, he had another vision to paint sacred art. According to Finster, "...one day I was workin' on a patch job on a bicycle, and I was rubbin' some white paint on that patch with this finger here, and I looked at the round tip o' my finger, and there was a human face on it... then a warm feelin' come over my body, and a voice spoke to me and said, 'Paint sacred art.'"

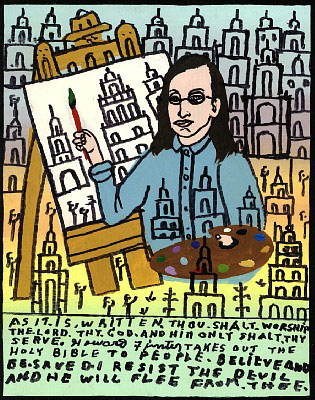
One of Finster's last portraits; Don Swartzentruber.

His diverse range of subjects include pop culture icons like Elvis Presley, historical figures like George Washington, Ronald Reagan, religious images like The Devils Vice and "John the Baptist," UFOs and aliens, war and politics. His paintings are colorful and detailed; they use flat picture plane without perspective and are often covered with words, especially Bible verses. Every painting also has a number: God had asked him to do 5,000 paintings to spread the gospel and Finster wanted to keep track.

He finished the 5,000 a few days before Christmas in 1985, but continued painting and numbering until the day he died. By 1989, he was already numbering in the ten thousands.

He first started receiving outside publicity in 1975. That year, Atlanta-based WAGA ran a story; he also appeared in an Esquire magazine article that first dubbed his museum Paradise Garden. He made his first exhibition appearance in 1976 and painted four paintings for the Library of Congress in 1977. He was also selected to be part of the Venice Biennale in 1984. Several of Finster's pieces are on display at the Smithsonian American Art Museum in Washington, D.C.

Finster gained national fame after his collaborative work with Athens, Georgia-based rock band R.E.M. The group filmed the video for the group's debut single "Radio Free Europe" in Finster's Paradise Gardens in 1983. The following year, the band's singer Michael Stipe and Finster collaborated on a painting for the cover of their second album Reckoning. After that the band made the song "Maps and Legends" (in its third album Fables of the Reconstruction) as an homage to Finster. Along with R.E.M., Finster also appeared in the documentary film Athens, GA: Inside Out, filmed in 1985, in which he tells the story of how he came to be an artist. Finster (and his art) also appears in the band's video for Radio Free Europe.

In the mid-1980s, Finster participated in the Mountain Lake Workshop in Virginia, led by educator and curator Ray Kass, where he came to do what he called a “work out” with the students alongside other artists in a collaborative, interdisciplinary environment.

The band Talking Heads commissioned a Finster painting for Little Creatures in 1985 that was subsequently selected as album cover of the year by Rolling Stone magazine. Other artists to use Finster as an album cover designer include Memory Dean, Pierce Pettis, and Adam Again. In 1994, a portion of his Paradise Garden was installed as part of the permanent collection of Atlanta's High Museum. Bill Mallonee of the Vigilantes of Love (also a Christian from Athens, Georgia) wrote a song inspired by Finster's artwork called The Glory and the Dream in 1994.

Howard Finster was responsible for introducing millions to outsider art, but even with his fame, he remained focused on religious outreach. He said of the Talking Heads album, "I think there's twenty-six religious verses on that first cover I done for them. They sold a million records in the first two and a half months after it come out, so that's twenty-six million verses I got out into the world in two and a half months!"

The classification of his creations overlap folk art and outsider art for the origin, naïve art and visionary art for the content.
