= Builders Exchange Building (Santa Ana, California) =

- U.S. National Register of Historic Places
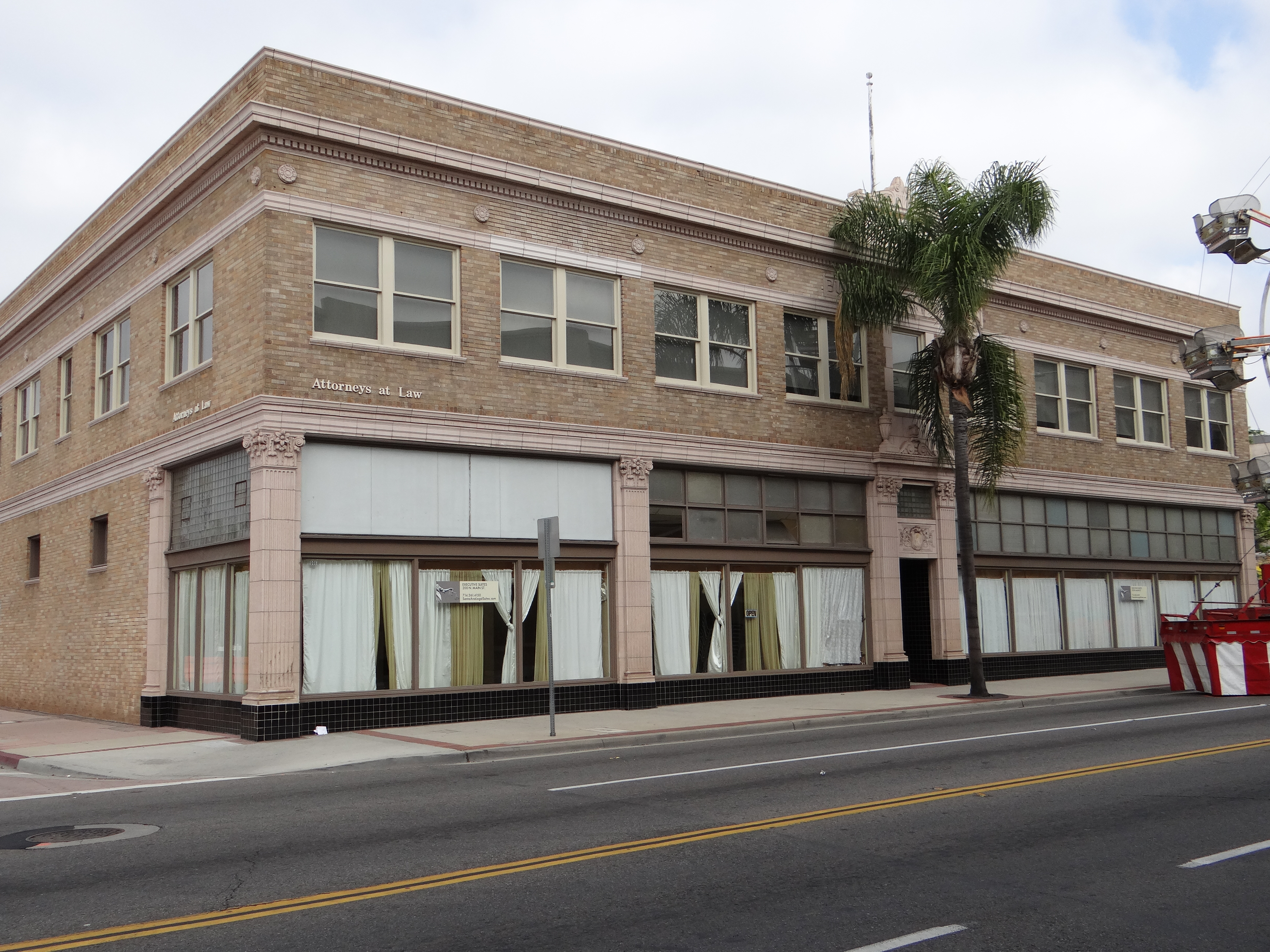

- Location within California Location within the United States
- Location: 202--208 N. Main St., Santa Ana, California
- Coordinates: 33°44′47″N 117°52′01″W
- Area: 0.3 acres (0.12 ha)
- Built: 1929
- Built by: C.A. Lansdown Construction Co.
- Architect: Rohrbacher, William
- Architectural style: Beaux Arts
- NRHP reference No.: 82002223
- Added to NRHP: April 29, 1982

The Builders Exchange Building, at 202-208 N. Main St. in Santa Ana, California, was built in 1929. It was listed on the National Register of Historic Places in 1982.

It was designed by architect William Rohrbacher in simplified Beaux Arts style. The building is currently owned by California-based General Contractor Swinerton Builders, CSLB 0092.
