= Warren County Courthouse (Georgia) =

- U.S. National Register of Historic Places
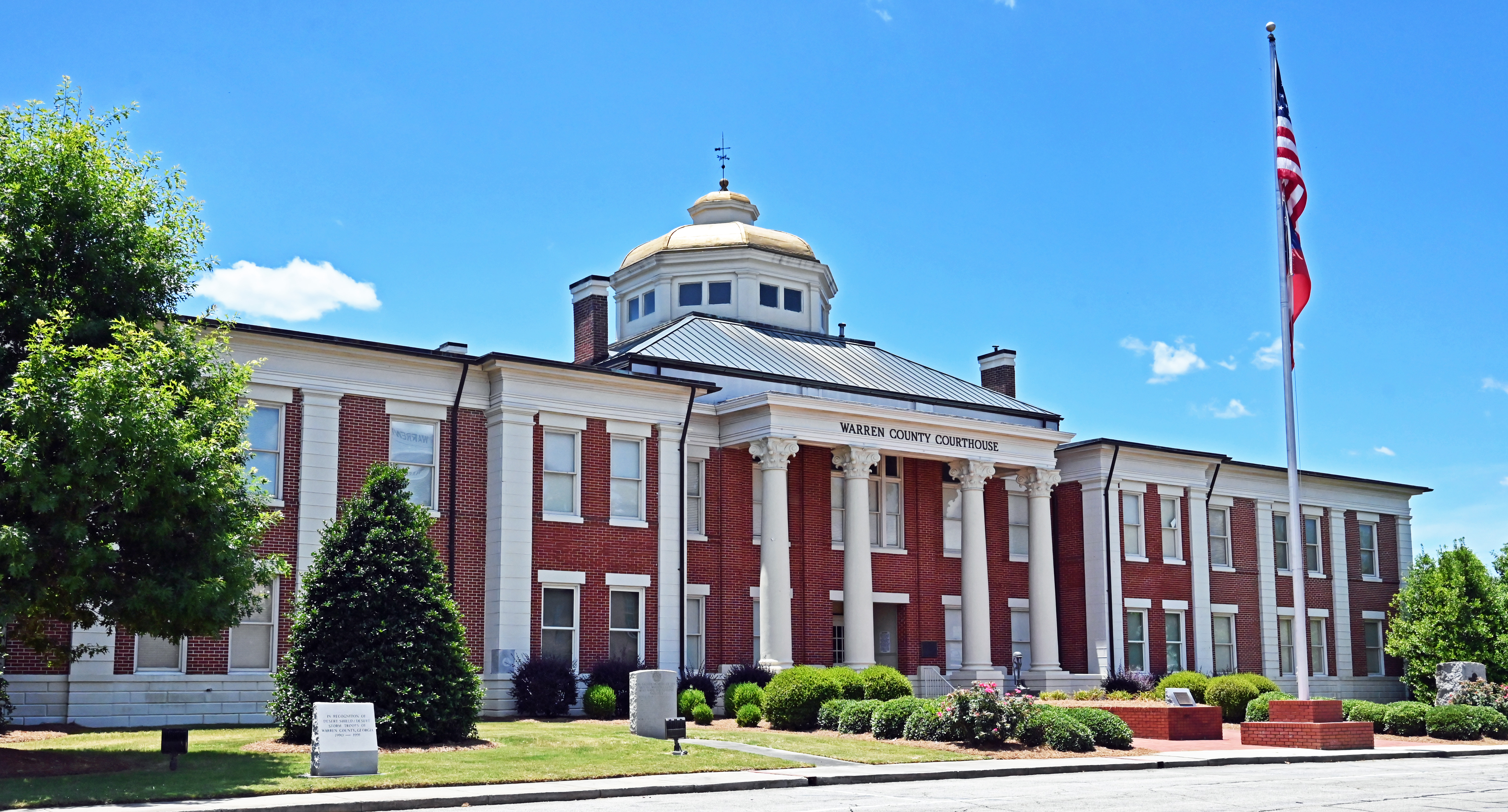
- The courthouse in 2022

- Location within Georgia
- Location: Courthouse Sq., Warrenton, Georgia
- Coordinates: 33°24′24″N 82°39′45″W
- Area: 1 acre (0.40 ha)
- Built: 1909
- Built by: Falls City Construction Co.
- Architect: Walter Chamberlain
- Architectural style: Classical Revival
- MPS: Georgia County Courthouses TR
- NRHP reference No.: 80001259
- Added to NRHP: September 18, 1980

The Warren County Courthouse in Warrenton, Georgia, located on Courthouse Square, was built in 1909. It is a Classical Revival-style building. It was listed on the National Register of Historic Places in 1980.

It is a cross-plan red brick courthouse sitting on a "tiny" square. It has a hipped roof with an octagonal dome topped by a cupola.
