= H. L. Lewman =

American businessman (1866–1917)

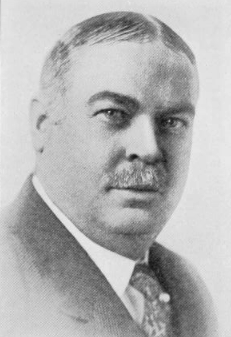
- Born: July 15, 1866; Greencastle, Indiana, U.S.
- Died: July 16, 1917 (aged 51); Louisville, Kentucky, U.S.
- Burial place: Cave Hill Cemetery; Louisville, Kentucky, U.S.
- Education: DePauw University
- Occupations: Builder; businessman
- Spouse: Leila Florence Curtis
- Children: 1

Harry L. Lewman (1866–1917) was an American building contractor and businessman.

== Biography ==
H. L. Lewman was born in Greencastle, Indiana on July 15, 1866. He was educated at public schools there, and studied civil engineering at DePauw University.

He married Leila Florence Curtis, and they had one daughter.

His father, Moses T. Lewman, established the architectural firm of M. T. Lewman & Co., but when Moses Lewman drowned at Tybee Island in 1889, his sons took over the firm, with H. L. Lewman becoming the principal director. The company was based in Louisville, Kentucky.

Lewman used builders' exchanges to bid on many projects. The firm's work includes the Old Monroe County Courthouse in Monroeville, Alabama; Claiborne County Courthouse (1903) in Port Gibson, Mississippi; Lee County Courthouse (1904) in Tupelo, Mississippi; and Lamar County Courthouse in Purvis, Mississippi. Several other courthouses the firm designed are no longer in existence. Several notable architects and builders are associated with the firm.

He died in Louisville on July 16, 1917, and was buried at Cave Hill Cemetery.
