= Summerville, Georgia =

- City
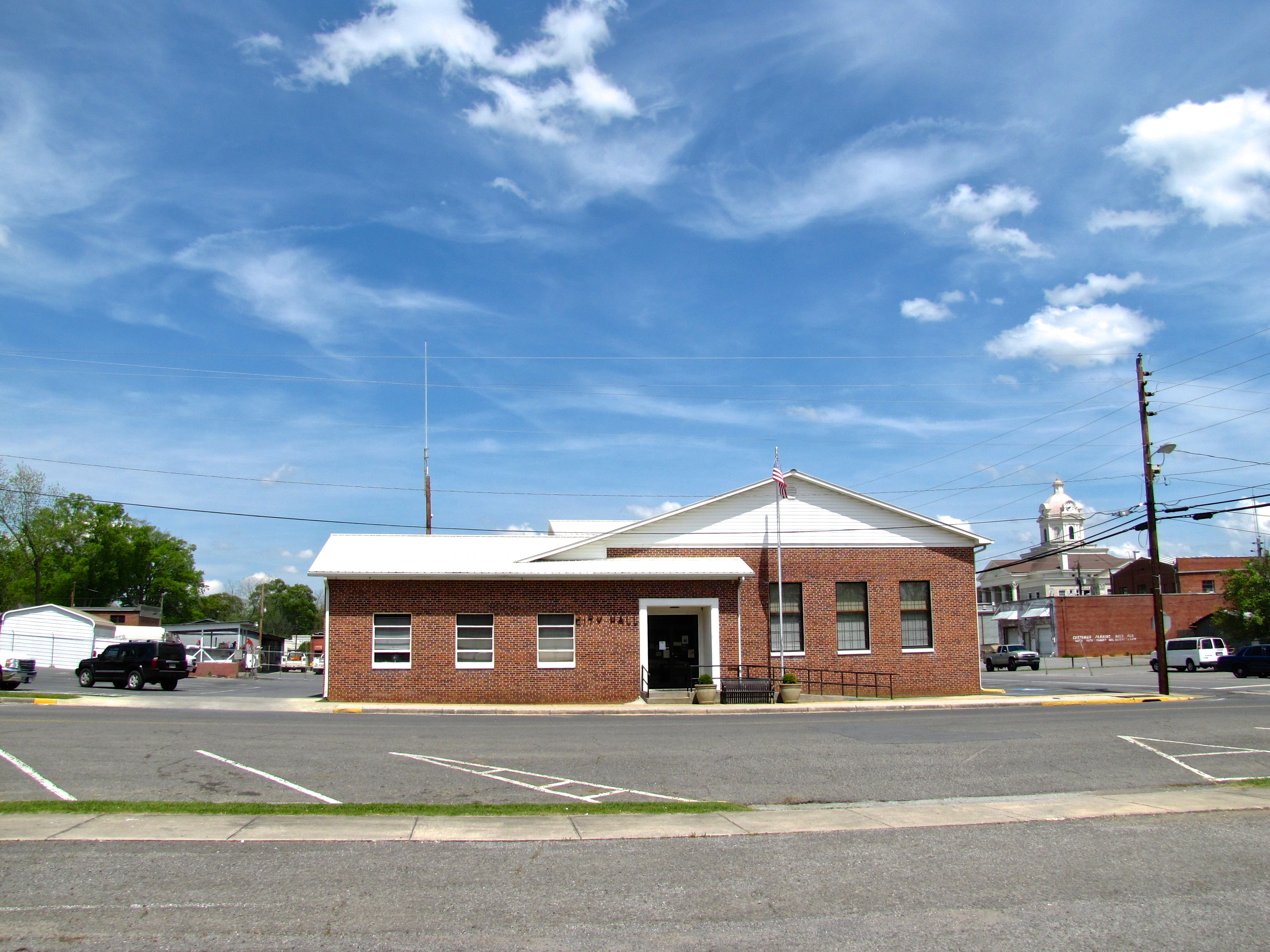
- Summerville City Hall

- Seal

- Location in Chattooga County and the state of Georgia
- Coordinates: 34°28′47″N 85°20′53″W
- Country: United States
- State: Georgia
- County: Chattooga

Area
  - Total: 4.02 sq mi (10.40 km^{2})
  - Land: 4.02 sq mi (10.40 km^{2})
  - Water: 0 sq mi (0.00 km^{2})
- Elevation: 650 ft (198 m)

Population (2020)
  - Total: 4,435
  - Density: 1,105.0/sq mi (426.64/km^{2})
- Time zone: UTC-5 (Eastern (EST))
  - Summer (DST): UTC-4 (EDT)
- ZIP code: 30747
- Area codes: 706/762
- FIPS code: 13-74376
- GNIS feature ID: 0333158
- Website: www.summervillega.org

Summerville is a city and the county seat of Chattooga County, Georgia, United States. The population was 4,435 at the 2020 census.

== History ==
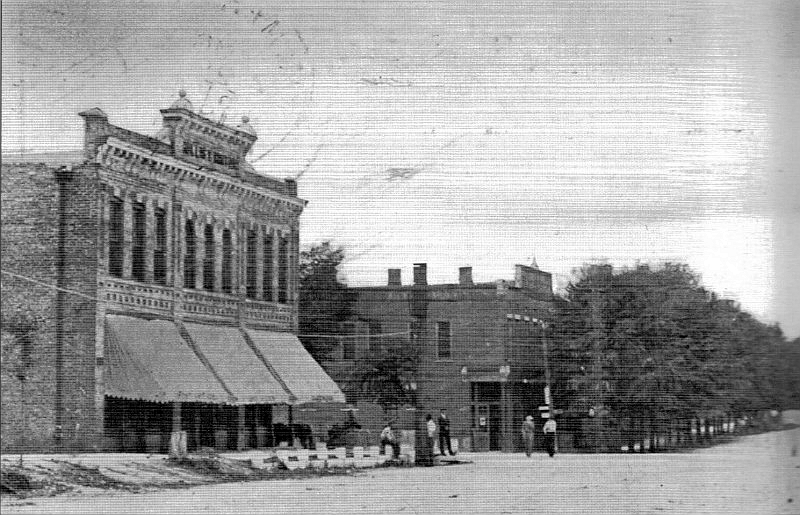
Hollis and Hinton store on Commerce Street, circa 1911

Summerville was founded in 1838 as the seat of the newly formed Chattooga County. It was incorporated as a town in 1839 and as a city in 1909. Summerville was named from the fact it was a popular summer resort. The city thrived in the late 1880s with the construction of the Chattanooga, Rome and Columbus Railroad (later part of the Central of Georgia system).

The Chattooga County Courthouse, listed on the National Register of Historic Places, was completed in 1909. The Summerville Depot, completed by the Central of Georgia in 1918, is also listed on the National Register, and is home to several annual festivals.

The Summerville Commercial Historic District was listed on the National Register of Historic Places in 2012. It covers about eight city blocks centered around Commerce Street, Georgia Avenue, and Washington Avenue in Summerville.

== Geography ==
According to the United States Census Bureau, the city has a total area of 4.0 square miles (10 km^{2}), all of it land. The city lies along the Chattooga River at the western base of the Taylor Ridge. U.S. Route 27 connects Summerville with Chattanooga, Tennessee, to the north, and Rome to the southeast. Georgia State Route 114 connects the city with Lyerly to the south, and Georgia State Route 48 connects the city with Menlo near the Alabama state line to the west.

=== Climate ===
Climate data for Summerville, Georgia, 1991–2020 normals, extremes 2000–present
Month	Jan	Feb	Mar	Apr	May	Jun	Jul	Aug	Sep	Oct	Nov	Dec	Year
Record high °F (°C)	79 (26)	84 (29)	88 (31)	92 (33)	97 (36)	102 (39)	104 (40)	103 (39)	99 (37)	98 (37)	87 (31)	78 (26)	104 (40)
Mean maximum °F (°C)	70.3 (21.3)	73.7 (23.2)	81.0 (27.2)	85.9 (29.9)	90.1 (32.3)	94.9 (34.9)	96.1 (35.6)	95.7 (35.4)	93.5 (34.2)	87.0 (30.6)	77.3 (25.2)	71.4 (21.9)	98.1 (36.7)
Mean daily maximum °F (°C)	52.0 (11.1)	56.6 (13.7)	64.3 (17.9)	73.4 (23.0)	79.9 (26.6)	86.6 (30.3)	89.9 (32.2)	89.2 (31.8)	84.4 (29.1)	74.5 (23.6)	63.3 (17.4)	54.6 (12.6)	72.4 (22.4)
Daily mean °F (°C)	40.5 (4.7)	44.0 (6.7)	50.8 (10.4)	59.0 (15.0)	67.3 (19.6)	75.0 (23.9)	78.5 (25.8)	77.6 (25.3)	71.7 (22.1)	60.6 (15.9)	49.4 (9.7)	43.4 (6.3)	59.8 (15.5)
Mean daily minimum °F (°C)	29.0 (−1.7)	31.4 (−0.3)	37.2 (2.9)	44.5 (6.9)	54.6 (12.6)	63.3 (17.4)	67.1 (19.5)	66.0 (18.9)	59.0 (15.0)	46.6 (8.1)	35.5 (1.9)	32.2 (0.1)	47.2 (8.4)
Mean minimum °F (°C)	11.9 (−11.2)	17.3 (−8.2)	22.1 (−5.5)	30.3 (−0.9)	39.2 (4.0)	53.7 (12.1)	57.5 (14.2)	57.1 (13.9)	45.9 (7.7)	30.2 (−1.0)	21.1 (−6.1)	18.4 (−7.6)	10.5 (−11.9)
Record low °F (°C)	3 (−16)	8 (−13)	17 (−8)	24 (−4)	34 (1)	48 (9)	50 (10)	50 (10)	39 (4)	24 (−4)	12 (−11)	8 (−13)	3 (−16)
Average precipitation inches (mm)	5.01 (127)	5.37 (136)	6.14 (156)	4.95 (126)	4.37 (111)	4.93 (125)	4.29 (109)	4.32 (110)	4.24 (108)	3.75 (95)	4.64 (118)	6.32 (161)	58.33 (1,482)
Average snowfall inches (cm)	0.1 (0.25)	0.1 (0.25)	0.0 (0.0)	0.0 (0.0)	0.0 (0.0)	0.0 (0.0)	0.0 (0.0)	0.0 (0.0)	0.0 (0.0)	0.0 (0.0)	0.0 (0.0)	0.1 (0.25)	0.3 (0.75)
Average precipitation days (≥ 0.01 in)	9.5	9.3	9.5	7.9	8.8	9.9	9.2	8.8	6.1	6.5	7.5	9.4	102.4
Average snowy days (≥ 0.1 in)	0.1	0.1	0.0	0.0	0.0	0.0	0.0	0.0	0.0	0.0	0.0	0.1	0.3
Source 1: NOAA
Source 2: National Weather Service (mean maxima/minima 2006–2020)

== Demographics ==
Historical population
Census	Pop.	Note	%±
1850	248		—
1860	350		41.1%
1870	281		−19.7%
1880	340		21.0%
1890	560		64.7%
1900	486		−13.2%
1910	657		35.2%
1920	1,003		52.7%
1930	933		−7.0%
1940	1,358		45.6%
1950	3,973		192.6%
1960	4,706		18.4%
1970	5,043		7.2%
1980	4,878		−3.3%
1990	5,025		3.0%
2000	4,556		−9.3%
2010	4,534		−0.5%
2020	4,435		−2.2%
U.S. Decennial Census

=== 2020 census ===
Summerville racial composition
Race	Num.	Perc.
White (non-Hispanic)	3,060	69.0%
Black or African American (non-Hispanic)	958	21.6%
Native American	6	0.14%
Asian	5	0.11%
Other/Mixed	270	6.09%
Hispanic or Latino	136	3.07%

As of the 2020 census, Summerville had a population of 4,435, and there were 997 families residing in the city. The median age was 42.9 years. 22.3% of residents were under the age of 18 and 19.6% of residents were 65 years of age or older. For every 100 females there were 83.9 males, and for every 100 females age 18 and over there were 78.4 males age 18 and over.

99.8% of residents lived in urban areas, while 0.2% lived in rural areas.

There were 1,851 households in Summerville, of which 29.4% had children under the age of 18 living in them. Of all households, 28.8% were married-couple households, 21.3% were households with a male householder and no spouse or partner present, and 42.1% were households with a female householder and no spouse or partner present. About 36.3% of all households were made up of individuals and 16.2% had someone living alone who was 65 years of age or older.

There were 2,111 housing units, of which 12.3% were vacant. The homeowner vacancy rate was 1.9% and the rental vacancy rate was 5.5%.

=== 2000 census ===
As of the census of 2000, there were 4,556 people, 1,823 households, and 1,141 families residing in the city. The population density was 1,144.3 inhabitants per square mile (441.8/km^{2}). There were 2,092 housing units at an average density of 525.4 per square mile (202.9/km^{2}). The racial makeup of the city was 72.06% White, 25.31% African American, 0.07% Native American, 0.15% Asian, 0.90% from other races, and 1.51% from two or more races. Hispanic or Latino of any race were 1.58% of the population.

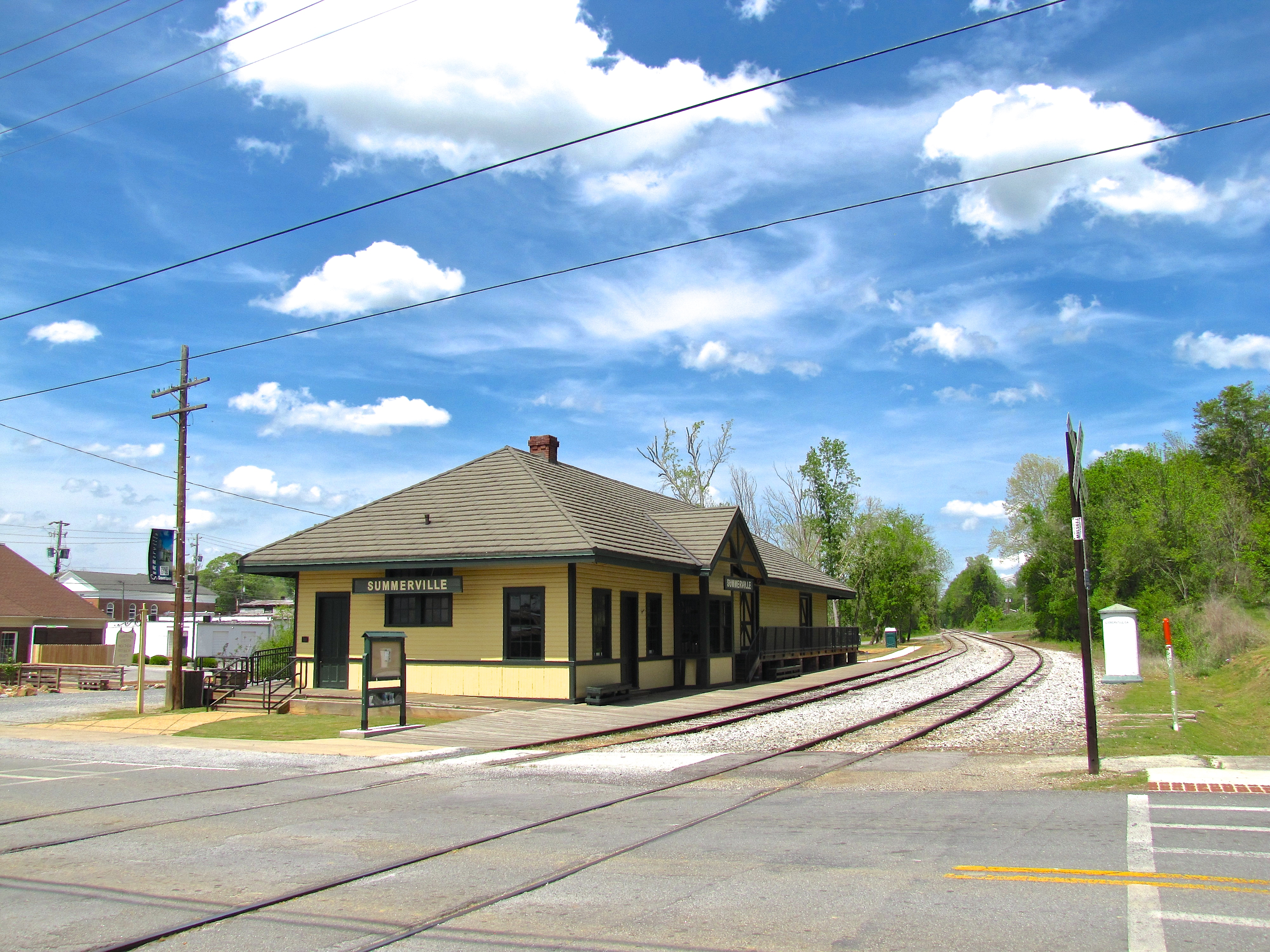
Summerville Depot

There were 1,823 households, out of which 28.7% had children under the age of 18 living with them, 39.8% were married couples living together, 17.8% had a female householder with no husband present, and 37.4% were non-families. 33.0% of all households were made up of individuals, and 16.4% had someone living alone who was 65 years of age or older. The average household size was 2.39 and the average family size was 3.04.

In the city, the population was spread out, with 24.3% under the age of 18, 9.0% from 18 to 24, 26.5% from 25 to 44, 21.7% from 45 to 64, and 18.5% who were 65 years of age or older. The median age was 38 years. For every 100 females, there were 84.7 males. For every 100 females age 18 and over, there were 78.8 males.

The median income for a household in the city was $24,911, and the median income for a family was $35,579. Males had a median income of $26,707 versus $20,222 for females. The per capita income for the city was $15,090. About 18.1% of families and 20.7% of the population were below the poverty line, including 28.5% of those under age 18 and 20.3% of those age 65 or over.

== Education ==
Public education in Summerville is administered by the Chattooga County School District. The district operates three elementary schools, one middle school, and one high school. The district has 184 full-time teachers and over 2,834 students.

- Leroy Massey Elementary School
- Lyerly Elementary School
- Menlo Elementary School
- Summerville Middle School
- Chattooga County High School

== World Friendship Flag Project Inc. ==
The World Friendship Flag Project Inc. is a nonprofit organization based in Summerville that focuses on childhood hunger and community engagement in Summerville through CARE and the Paradise Garden Foundation.

World Friendship Flag Project Inc.
- Formation: 1995
- Founder: John Charles Turner
- Type: Childhood hunger nonprofit
- Headquarters: 214 W 1st Ave, Summerville, GA 30747
- Origins: Rotary Interact Club
- Website: www.worldfriendshipflag.com

=== History and influence on Summerville ===
The organization's founder, John Charles Turner, is a retired teacher who taught art at Chattooga High School. He was the advisor of the school's Rotary Interact Club where the World Friendship Flag was created. The flag was designed by Howard Finster, an artist who also resided in Summerville.

The flag was shown at the 1996 Atlanta Olympics. Brody Malone, a gymnast from Summerville, competed in the 2020 Tokyo Olympics and was given a signed World Friendship Flag.

In 2021, Summerville began the annual Friendship Festival, which occurs in Dowdy Park on the last Saturday in July. Preceding the event is Friendship Week, a week-long event with activities intended to promote community engagement. Summerville has branded itself as the "friendship capital of the world."

In 2023, a pocket park known as the World Friendship Pocket Park was completed in Summerville. The park was funded by a "Buy a Brick" fundraiser which allowed people to purchase engraved bricks to be displayed in the park. In the center of the park is the "Solid Rock of World Friendship," a commemorative rock for the World Friendship Flag Project.

== Notable people ==
- Bobby Lee Cook, noted trial attorney
- Edna Cain Daniel, journalist and publisher
- Howard Finster, folk artist
- Brody Malone, artistic gymnast
- Senorise Perry, NFL player

== See also ==
- J.R. Dick Dowdy Park
- Paradise Garden
