= Appling County Courthouse =

- U.S. National Register of Historic Places
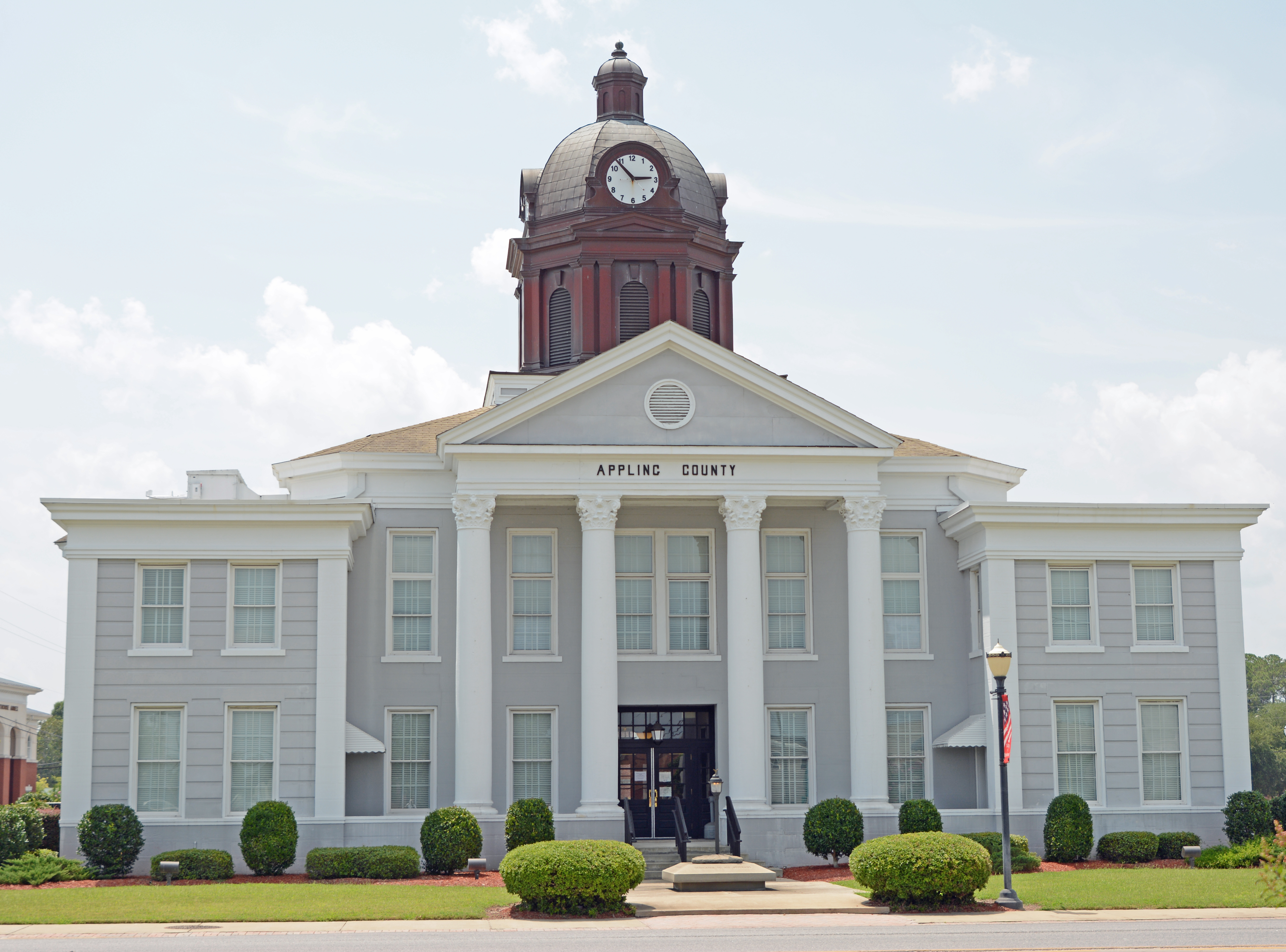
- The courthouse in 2015

- Location within Georgia Location within the United States
- Location: Courthouse Sq., Baxley, Georgia
- Coordinates: 31.77805°N 82.34927°W
- Area: 2 acres (0.81 ha)
- Built: 1907–1908
- Built by: Falls City Construction Co.
- Architect: H.L. Lewman
- Architectural style: Classical Revival
- MPS: Georgia County Courthouses TR
- NRHP reference No.: 80000965
- Added to NRHP: September 18, 1980

The Appling County Courthouse, located in Baxley, Georgia, was built in 1907–1908 at a cost of $50,000. It is in the Neoclassical style and is constructed of limestone and concrete. The interior is a cross pattern with four entrances. The first floor has wainscoting 56 inches (1.4 m) high, made of Georgia marble.

It was added to the National Register of Historic Places in 1980.
