= Summerville station =

- Summerville Depot
- U.S. National Register of Historic Places
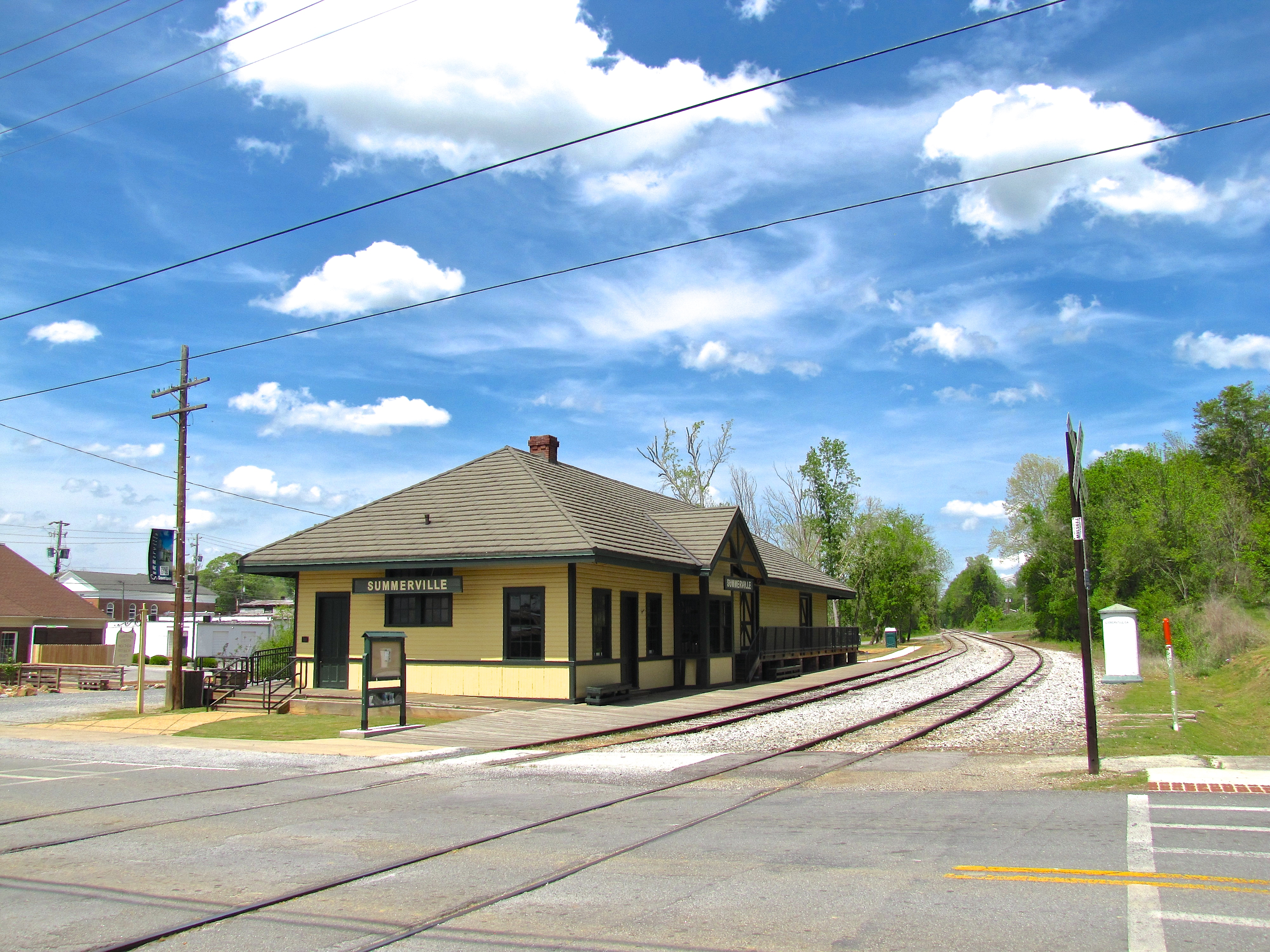

- Location within Georgia
- Location: 120 E. Washington Ave., Summerville, Georgia
- Coordinates: 34°28′47″N 85°20′46″W
- Area: less than one acre
- Built: 1918
- Architectural style: Prairie School
- NRHP reference No.: 91002037
- Added to NRHP: January 29, 1992

The Summerville Depot, at 120 East Washington Avenue in Summerville, Georgia, was built in 1918. It was listed on the National Register of Historic Places in 1992.

It is a one-story frame Prairie School-style depot building. It has a hipped roof and wide eaves, and weatherboard siding above tongue-and-groove exterior wainscoting.

It was a passenger train stop on the Central of Georgia's Griffin and Chattanooga division.

Ownership of the building was acquired in 1989 by the Chattooga County Historical Society, along with a long-term lease on the land with Norfolk Southern Corporation. It planned to restore the depot for use by the historical society and other civic organizations and to include museum exhibits. When listed in 1992, there were plans for an original block and tackle and telegraph key to be restored to the property.

It was deemed "an excellent example of a combination railroad passenger and freight depot constructed in the early 1900s." Until the fall of 2019, and resuming in the fall of 2023, the Tennessee Valley Railroad Museum in Chattanooga has operated occasional excursions between their Grand Junction Station in Tennessee and the Summerville Depot.
