= Howard Finster's Paradise Garden =

Park and folk art exhibit in Summerville, Georgia, USA

Coordinates: 34.51290100°N 85.31641200°W

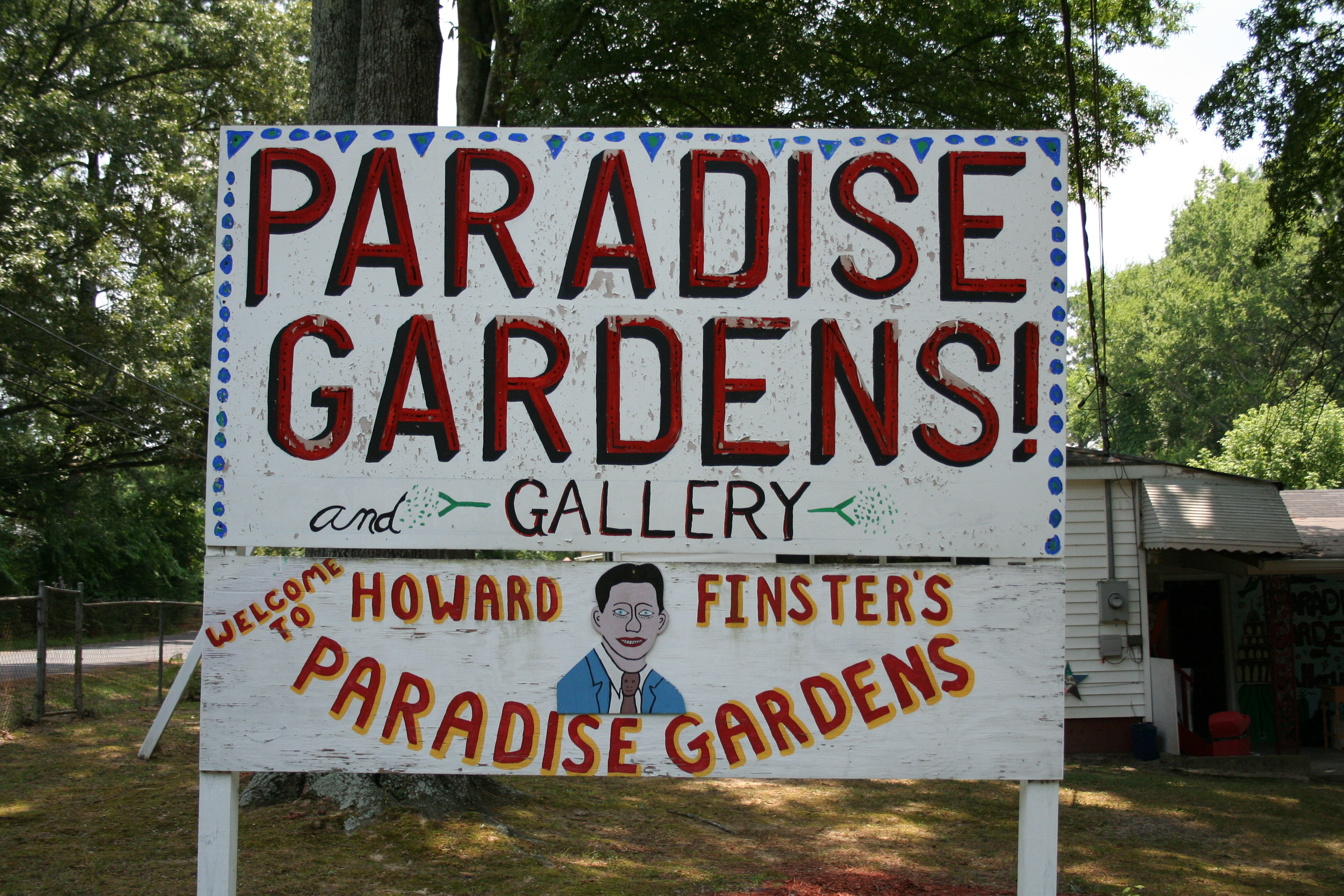
sign for Paradise Garden

Howard Finster's Paradise Garden in Summerville, Georgia was the home and workplace of Baptist minister and American artist Howard Finster and is now a public park dedicated to his life and work. The garden is a world-renowned site for American folk art.
