= Chattooga County Courthouse =

- U.S. National Register of Historic Places
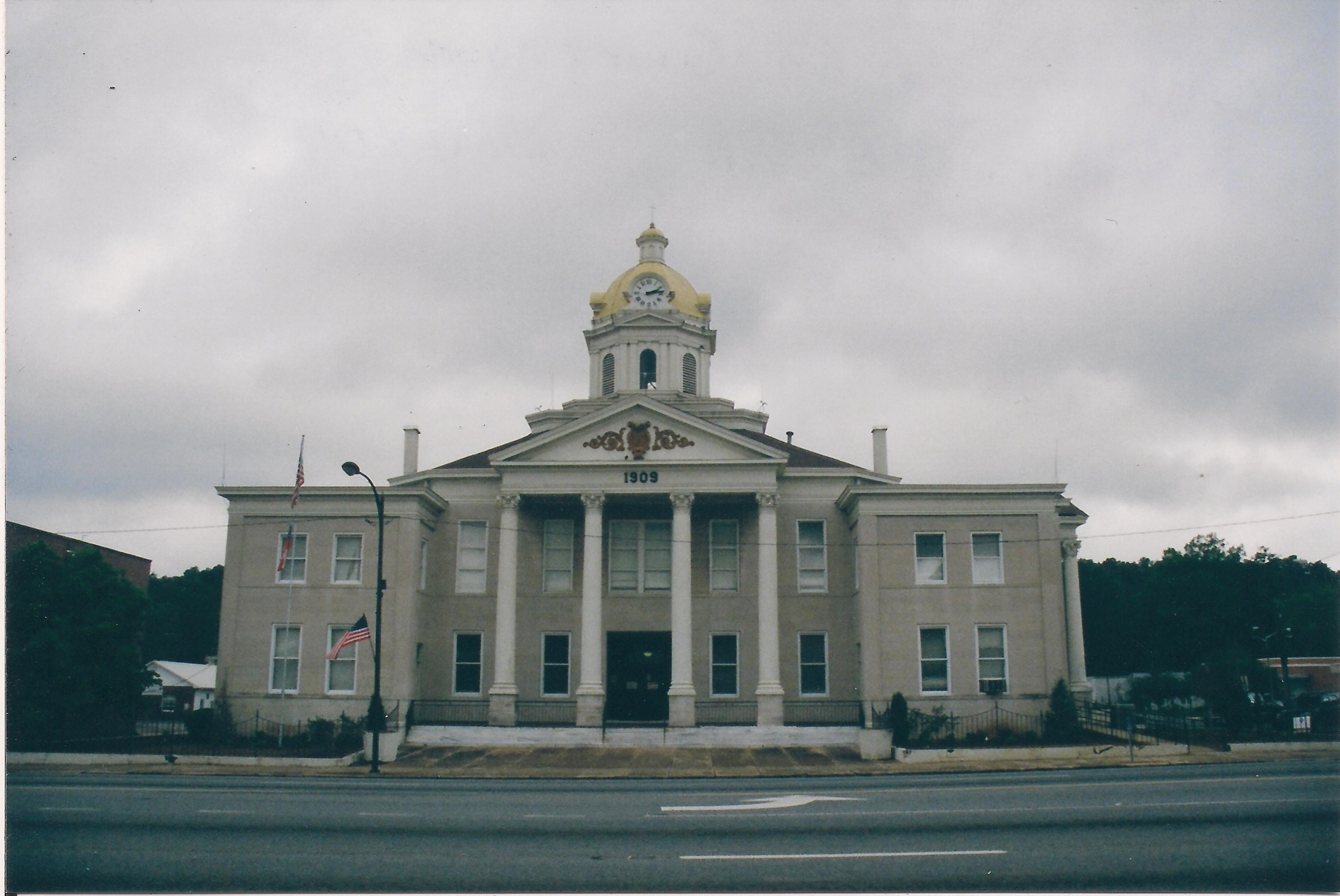

- Location within Georgia
- Location: Courthouse Sq., Summerville, Georgia
- Coordinates: 34°28′49″N 85°20′55″W
- Area: 1 acre (0.40 ha)
- Built: 1909
- Built by: Falls City Construction Co.
- Architect: Bryan Architectural Firm
- Architectural style: Classical Revival
- MPS: Georgia County Courthouses TR
- NRHP reference No.: 80000988
- Added to NRHP: September 18, 1980

Chattooga County Courthouse is a courthouse on Courthouse Sq. in Summerville, Georgia that was built in 1909. It was listed on the National Register of Historic Places in 1980.

The courthouse has three pedimented Corinthian tetrastyle entrances; the fourth entrance, also pedimented, has just four Corinthian pilasters. It has a domed clock tower.

== Boundary ==
The portion of the block includes the courthouse and is bounded on the north by Cox St.; east by Washington St.; south by Commerce St.: and west by an alley.

== Description ==
All entrances of the courthouse are pedimented. Pavilions project from a core; a domed clock tower with a lantern rises in three stages. An iron fence surrounds the courthouse. Original wooden doors are at the entries; marble wainscoting is about 4 feet high in the hallway on the first floor.

The courtroom has a lowered ceiling; the old pressed metal has been replaced by acoustical tile. Behind the simple bench is an arched stained glass window proclaiming “wisdom, justice, and moderation”. The balcony is enclosed. The walls are plaster with wooden wainscoting. A small holding cell is in the hall behind the bench.

== History and Development ==
On March 23, 1839, the Interior Court Justices were granted the authority by an act of the General Assembly to choose a location for the county seat, purchase land, subdivide it into lots, and sell those lots to generate funds for the construction of a county courthouse and jail. They acquired a parcel of ninety acres from John F. Beavers for the sum of $1800. Until this endeavor was completed, the legislative directive specified that meetings take place at the residence of John Pickens Henry. Following this, the Interior Court may have designated Summerville as the county seat. In any case, on December 21, 1839, the General Assembly formally incorporated Summerville and designated it as the permanent county seat.

Apart from its central location, the primary reason for selecting this site was the presence of a significant spring. This spring, known by various names including Big Spring, Beavers Spring, Cleghorn Spring, and eventually Willow Spring, was capable of providing water to the town's residents for an extended period. Although there was some dispute regarding the spring's ownership, it remained with Colonel Beavers, yet there was an informal agreement allowing the town's inhabitants to utilize the water.

Initially named Selma, the county seat of Chattooga County was later changed to Summerville to promote the pleasant climate in the region, possibly at the suggestion of David Taylor, a prominent settler from Augusta. The initial sale of lots progressed slowly, and it wasn't until 1842 that a log courthouse was erected at the intersection of Washington and Jackson Streets (now Commerce Street), which is still the courthouse's current location today.

The first courthouse was a log structure constructed in 1842 by the Hitchcock brothers. Subsequently, a two-story brick courthouse was built, serving the county until the construction of the present courthouse in 1909.

On July 30, 1908, the Board of Roads and Revenue initiated a bond referendum scheduled for December 1908, with the purpose of voting on a $55,000 bond issue to finance the construction of a new courthouse. The bond issue was approved, and the Board began planning for the new courthouse's construction. After seeing the recently constructed courthouse in Baxley, Georgia, in Appling County, the Board decided to adopt identical plans for Chattooga County. The court validated the $50,000 bond issue, and the bonds were sold to the Robinson-Humphrey Company of Atlanta in January 1909. Construction of the new courthouse commenced under the supervision of R.L. Rolland.

The present courthouse was constructed in the Neoclassical Revival Style, and it was designed by the Bryan Architectural Firm. It was erected by the Falls City Construction Company from Louisville, Kentucky at a cost of $60,000. The Courthouse's stained glass window depicts the Great Seal of Georgia.

The laying of the cornerstone was organized by the county's Masons on July 15, 1909. Among the items placed within the cornerstone were the History of Summerville Lodge No. 109 F & A. M., a copy of the July edition of The Summerville News, a historical account of the bond election related to the courthouse bonds, various Masonic documents, and several business cards from local businessmen.
