= Georgia State Route 118 =

State highway in Georgia, United States

State Route 118
- SR 118 highlighted in red

Route information
- Maintained by GDOT
- Length: 27.0 mi (43.5 km)

Major junctions
- West end: SR 32 in Dawson
- US 19 / SR 3 in Smithville; SR 377 east of Smithville; SR 195 in Leslie
- East end: US 280 / SR 30 / SR 195 in Leslie

Location
- Country: United States
- State: Georgia
- Counties: Terrell, Lee, Sumter

Highway system
- Georgia State Highway System; Interstate; US; State; Special
← SR 117	→ SR 119

State Route 118 (SR 118) is a southwest–northeast state highway in the southwest part of the U.S. state of Georgia. The highway runs 27.0 miles (43.5 km) from Dawson, northeast through Smithville, to Leslie. Between Dawson and Smithville, the route parallels the Georgia Southwestern Railroad.

== Route description ==
SR 118 begins at an intersection with SR 32 in Dawson. The route heads northeast, and crosses Kinchafoonee Creek before intersecting US 19/SR 3 in Smithville. East of Smithville, the route crosses Muckalee Creek before intersecting SR 377. It continues to the northeast to Leslie. In Leslie, the route has a brief (about 0.4 miles (0.64 km)) concurrency with SR 195. At its eastern terminus, an intersection with US 280/SR 30, SR 195 heads east with US 280/SR 30.

== Major intersections ==
County	Location	mi	km	Destinations	Notes
Terrell	Dawson	0.0	0.0	SR 32 – Cuthbert, Leesburg	Western terminus
Kinchafoonee Creek		10.3	16.6	Terrell–Lee county line	
Lee	Smithville	13.6	21.9	US 19 / SR 3 – Albany, Americus	
Lee		18.8	30.3	SR 377 – Americus	
Sumter	Leslie	26.6	42.8	SR 195 south – Leesburg	Western end of SR 195 concurrency
Sumter	Leslie	27.0	43.5	US 280 / SR 30 / SR 195 north (Patterson Street) – Americus, Cordele, Andersonville	Eastern terminus; eastern end of SR 195 concurrency
1.000 mi = 1.609 km; 1.000 km = 0.621 mi: Concurrency terminus
