= Georgia State Route 377 =

State highway in Georgia, United States

State Route 377
- Lee Street
- SR 377 highlighted in red

Route information
- Maintained by GDOT
- Length: 20.0 mi (32.2 km)
- Existed: January 1, 1976–present

Major junctions
- South end: SR 195 northeast of Leesburg
- SR 118 east of Smithville
- North end: US 280 / SR 27 / SR 30 / SR 49 in Americus

Location
- Country: United States
- State: Georgia
- Counties: Lee, Sumter

Highway system
- Georgia State Highway System; Interstate; US; State; Special
← SR 376	→ US 378

State Route 377 (SR 377) is a 20.0-mile-long (32.2 km) state highway that travels south-to-north through portions of Lee and Sumter counties in the southwestern part of the U.S. state of Georgia. The roadway was built in the late 1950s and was designated as SR 377 in the mid-1970s.

== Route description ==
SR 377 begins at an intersection with SR 195 in rural Lee County. It heads northwest, and curves to the north-northwest, to an intersection with SR 118, east of Smithville. The route continues to the north-northwest, crossing into Sumter County along the way, and meets its northern terminus, two intersections with US 280/SR 27/SR 30/SR 49, on one-way pairs, in Americus. The highway roughly parallels US 19/SR 3 for nearly its entire length.

SR 377 is not part of the National Highway System, a system of roadways important to the nation's economy, defense, and mobility.

== History ==
The road that would eventually become SR 377 was built between 1957 and 1960, but only between SR 195 and SR 118. By 1966, the road was extended to Americus. By 1976, the entire road was designated as SR 377.

== Major intersections ==
County	Location	mi	km	Destinations	Notes
Lee		0.0	0.0	SR 195 – Leesburg, Leslie	Southern terminus
Lee		7.5	12.1	SR 118 – Smithville, Leslie	
Sumter	Americus	19.9	32.0	US 280 east / SR 27 east / SR 30 east / SR 49 north (Lamar Street)	Eastbound lanes of US 280/SR 27/SR 30/SR 49 on one-way pairs
Sumter	Americus	20.0	32.2	US 280 west / SR 27 west / SR 30 west / SR 49 south (Forsyth Street)	Northern terminus; westbound lanes of US 280/SR 27/SR 30/SR 49 on one-way pairs
1.000 mi = 1.609 km; 1.000 km = 0.621 mi
