= Sumter County, Georgia =

County in Georgia, United States

- County
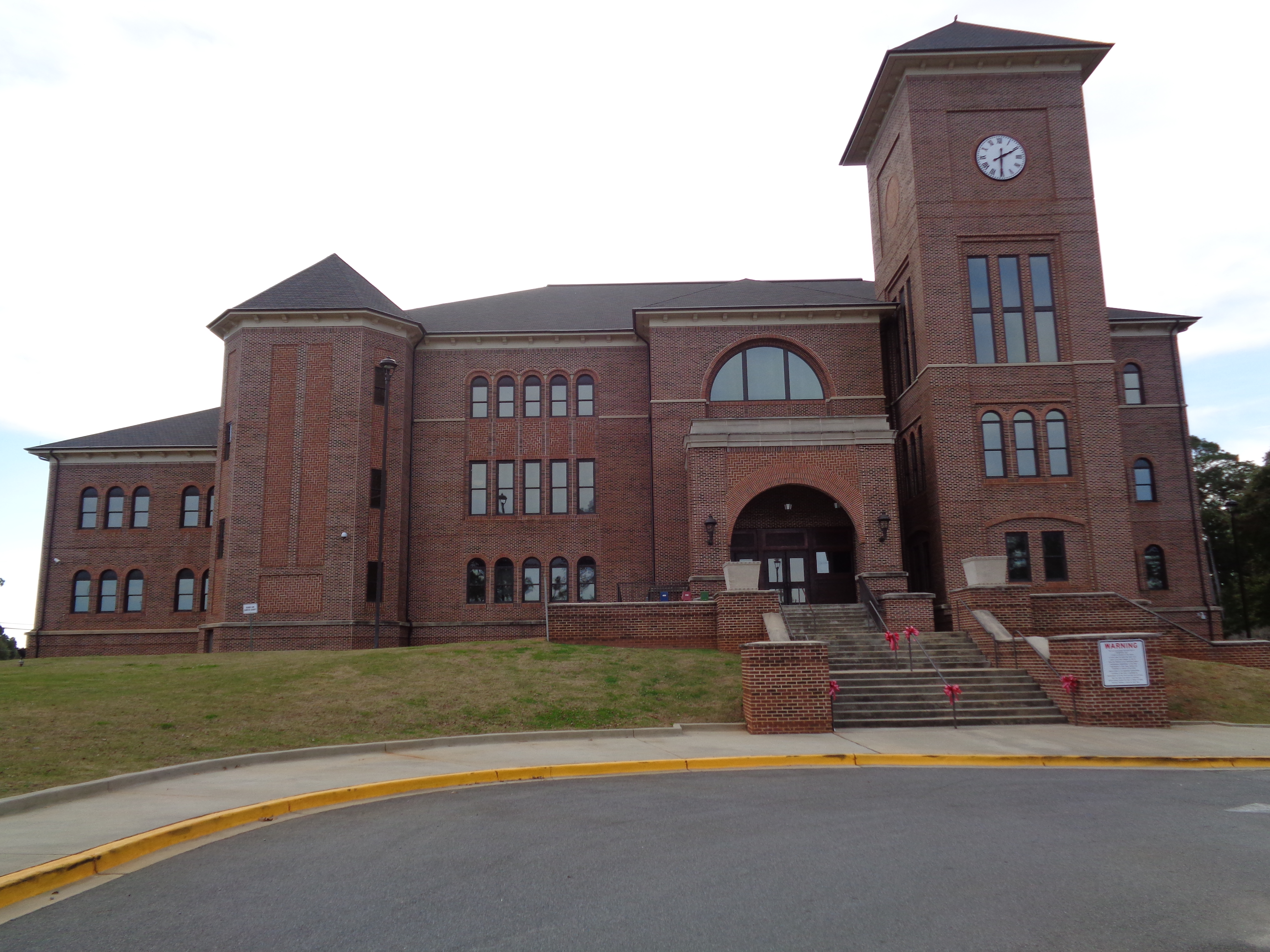
- Sumter County Courthouse in Americus

- Seal Logo

- Location within the U.S. state of Georgia
- Coordinates: 32°02′N 84°12′W
- Country: United States
- State: Georgia
- Founded: December 26, 1831; 194 years ago
- Named for: Thomas Sumter
- Seat: Americus
- Largest city: Americus

Area
  - Total: 493 sq mi (1,280 km^{2})
  - Land: 483 sq mi (1,250 km^{2})
  - Water: 10 sq mi (26 km^{2}) 2.0%

Population (2020)
  - Total: 29,616
  - Estimate (2025): 28,801 ▼
  - Density: 61/sq mi (24/km^{2})
- Time zone: UTC−5 (Eastern)
  - Summer (DST): UTC−4 (EDT)
- Congressional district: 2nd
- Website: sumtercountyga.us

Sumter County is a county located in the west-central portion of the U.S. state of Georgia. As of the 2020 census, its population was 29,616. The county seat is Americus. The county was created on December 26, 1831.

Sumter County is part of the Americus micropolitan statistical area.

== History ==
=== Foundation and antebellum years ===
Sumter County was established by an act of the state legislature on December 26, 1831, four years after the Creek Indians were forced from the region when the state acquired the territory from them in the 1825 Treaty of Indian Springs. Sumter, the state's 80th county, was created after population increases by a division of Lee County, now situated to its south. The county was named for former General and United States Senator Thomas Sumter (1734–1832) of South Carolina. When the county was organized, Sumter was 97 years old and the last surviving general of the American Revolution (1775–1783).

Shortly thereafter, a committee chose a central site for the county seat, and laid out what became the town of Americus. Many of the county's earliest white residents acquired their land through an 1827 state land lottery. Like many other white settlers, they quickly developed their property for cotton cultivation. Since the invention of the cotton gin at the end of the 18th century, short-staple cotton was the crop of choice throughout the Black Belt of the South.

The rich, black soil, combined with ready market access via the Flint River (bordering the county on the east) or the Chattahoochee River (farther west), put Sumter among the state's most prosperous Black Belt counties by the 1840s and 1850s. Cotton agriculture was economically dependent on enslaved African Americans. By the 1850 census, the demographic makeup of the county had become 6,469 whites, 3,835 enslaved African Americans, and 18 free people of color. By the 1860 census, the county had 4,536 whites, 4,890 enslaved African Americans and two free people of color.

=== Civil War years ===
During the American Civil War (1861–65), the small village named Andersonville, 9 mi (14 km) north of Americus on the county's northern edge, was selected by Confederate authorities as the site for a prisoner-of-war camp. The Andersonville prison was built in neighboring Macon County, and became the largest such prison in the South. During the camp's 14 months of operations, some 45,000 Union prisoners suffered some of the worst conditions and highest casualties of any of the camps. Today, the Andersonville National Historic Site serves as a memorial to all American prisoners of war throughout the nation's history. The 495-acre (2.00 km^{2}) park lies in both Macon and Sumter Counties and consists of the historic prison site and the National Cemetery, which originally was reserved for the Union dead.

=== Into modernity ===
Other areas of the county have attracted national attention in the 20th century for very different reasons. In 1942, two Baptist ministers chose a farm in the western part of the county as the location for a Christian commune named Koinonia, where Black and White workers lived and worked together for nearly 50 years, generating some hostility among local residents during its early years.

Sumter County counts a U.S. president among its native sons. Jimmy Carter was born and raised on a peanut farm in Plains, a small community on the county's western edge. His election to the presidency in 1976 brought the small town considerable attention from journalists and tourists, which it continues to receive as the Carters lived in Plains until their respective deaths and much of their family still makes Plains their home. The Jimmy Carter National Historical Park, which includes Carter's birthplace, childhood home, high school, train depot that served as his campaign headquarters along with the Carter family home and burial site, is located in and around Plains. All of the sites at the park are open for tours except for the Carter home and burial site, which are under renovation.

The headquarters of Habitat for Humanity International, a nonprofit organization whose mission is to eliminate homelessness, is located in Americus, the home of its founder, Millard Fuller. In addition to Habitat's socially impactful activities, Koinonia Partners publishes a bimonthly newsletter for the Prison and Jail Project promoting prisoner reform and education. Americus is also home to two colleges. Georgia Southwestern State University, a public four-year institution established in 1906, is part of the University System of Georgia. South Georgia Technical College, which stands near Souther Field, was a training base for American and British aviators during World War I (1917–18). Charles Lindbergh learned to fly here and assembled a military surplus "Jenny" aircraft with the help of mechanics at Souther Field. Downtown Americus boasts two prominent examples of historic restoration: the Windsor Hotel, built in 1892, and the Rylander Theatre, which originally opened in 1921.

== Geography ==
According to the U.S. Census Bureau, the county has a total area of 493 sq mi (1,280 km^{2}), of which 483 sq mi (1,250 km^{2}) are land and 10 sq mi (26 km^{2}) (2.0%) are covered by water.

Muckalee Creek flows through Sumter County, which also contains Lake Blackshear and Kinchafoonee Creek.

The western two-thirds of Sumter County, from northeast of Americus to southwest of Leslie, is located in the Kinchafoonee-Muckalee subbasin of the ACF River Basin (Apalachicola-Chattahoochee-Flint River Basin). The eastern third of the county is located in the Middle Flint River subbasin of the same ACF River Basin.

=== Major highways ===
- U.S. Route 19 / State Route 3
- U.S. Route 280
- State Route 27
- State Route 30
- State Route 45
- State Route 49
- State Route 118
- State Route 153
- State Route 195
- State Route 228
- State Route 271
- State Route 308
- State Route 377

=== Adjacent counties ===
- Macon County (northeast)
- Dooly County (east)
- Crisp County (southeast)
- Lee County (south)
- Terrell County (southwest)
- Webster County (west)
- Marion County (northwest)
- Schley County (north)

=== National protected areas ===
- Andersonville National Historic Site (part)
- Jimmy Carter National Historical Park

== Communities ==
=== Cities ===
- Americus (county seat)
- Andersonville
- De Soto
- Leslie
- Plains

=== Unincorporated communities ===
- Cobb
- Flintside

== Demographics ==
Historical population
Census	Pop.	Note	%±
1840	5,759		—
1850	10,322		79.2%
1860	9,428		−8.7%
1870	16,559		75.6%
1880	18,239		10.1%
1890	22,107		21.2%
1900	26,212		18.6%
1910	29,092		11.0%
1920	29,640		1.9%
1930	26,800		−9.6%
1940	24,502		−8.6%
1950	24,208		−1.2%
1960	24,652		1.8%
1970	26,931		9.2%
1980	29,360		9.0%
1990	30,228		3.0%
2000	33,200		9.8%
2010	32,819		−1.1%
2020	29,616		−9.8%
2025 (est.)	28,801	▼	−2.8%
U.S. Decennial Census; 1790-1880 1890-1910; 1920-1930 1930-1940; 1940-1950 1960-1980; 1980-2000 2010 2020

=== Racial and ethnic composition ===
Sumter County, Georgia – Racial and ethnic composition Note: the US Census treats Hispanic/Latino as an ethnic category. This table excludes Latinos from the racial categories and assigns them to a separate category. Hispanics/Latinos may be of any race.
Race / Ethnicity (NH = Non-Hispanic)	Pop 1980	Pop 1990	Pop 2000	Pop 2010	Pop 2020	% 1980	% 1990	% 2000	% 2010	% 2020
White alone (NH)	16,169	15,816	15,672	13,413	11,528	55.07%	52.32%	47.20%	40.87%	38.92%
Black or African American alone (NH)	12,771	14,010	16,196	16,894	15,051	43.50%	46.35%	48.78%	51.48%	50.82%
Native American or Alaska Native alone (NH)	59	100	73	95	40	0.20%	0.33%	0.22%	0.29%	0.14%
Asian alone (NH)	67	109	193	418	503	0.23%	0.36%	0.58%	1.27%	1.70%
Native Hawaiian or Pacific Islander alone (NH)	x	x	6	9	4	x	x	0.02%	0.03%	0.01%
Other race alone (NH)	3	4	10	12	55	0.01%	0.01%	0.03%	0.04%	0.19%
Mixed race or Multiracial (NH)	x	x	159	261	665	x	x	0.48%	0.80%	2.25%
Hispanic or Latino (any race)	291	189	891	1,717	1,770	0.99%	0.63%	2.68%	5.23%	5.98%
Total	29,360	30,228	33,200	32,819	29,616	100.00%	100.00%	100.00%	100.00%	100.00%

=== 2020 census ===
As of the 2020 census, the county had a population of 29,616, 11,658 households, and 7,256 families residing in the county. The median age was 38.7 years; 22.2% of residents were under the age of 18 and 18.2% of residents were 65 years of age or older. For every 100 females there were 92.5 males, and for every 100 females age 18 and over there were 89.4 males age 18 and over. 58.8% of residents lived in urban areas, while 41.2% lived in rural areas.

The racial makeup of the county was 39.8% White, 51.1% Black or African American, 0.3% American Indian and Alaska Native, 1.7% Asian, 0.0% Native Hawaiian and Pacific Islander, 4.1% from some other race, and 3.1% from two or more races. Hispanic or Latino residents of any race comprised 6.0% of the population.

There were 11,658 households in the county, of which 29.7% had children under the age of 18 living with them and 39.4% had a female householder with no spouse or partner present. About 31.0% of all households were made up of individuals and 13.0% had someone living alone who was 65 years of age or older.

There were 13,458 housing units, of which 13.4% were vacant. Among occupied housing units, 55.1% were owner-occupied and 44.9% were renter-occupied. The homeowner vacancy rate was 2.4% and the rental vacancy rate was 7.0%.

== Economy ==
Sumter remains largely a rural county. According to USDA/Georgia Agricultural Statistics Service 2001 figures, cotton remains its major crop, with up to 35,000 acres (140 km^{2}) under cultivation, followed by wheat, peanuts, and corn, which when combined, roughly equal the county's acreage in cotton.

Its major employers include Cooper Lighting, Georgia Southwestern State University, Magnolia Manor, Phoebe Sumter Medical Center, and Walmart.

== Politics ==
Sumter County was usually a swing county in presidential elections, voting 50.9% for Kamala Harris in 2024. Since 1960, it has voted Democratic eight times, including in 1976, when Sumter County native Jimmy Carter was elected, Republican six times, and for a third-party candidate (George Wallace) once. The last candidate to carry the county by more than 10 points was Bill Clinton in 1996. The strength of the Democratic Party in Sumter County is owed in part to its high African American population.

The county voted for the winner of the presidential election each year from 1984 to 2012, sticking with the Democrats (Carter's party) in 2016 when Hillary Clinton won a plurality of the vote.

For elections to the United States House of Representatives, Sumter County is part of Georgia's 2nd congressional district, currently represented by Sanford Bishop. For elections to the Georgia State Senate, Sumter County is part of District 12. For elections to the Georgia House of Representatives, Sumter County is part of District 151.

United States presidential election results for Sumter County, Georgia
Year	Republican		Democratic		Third party(ies)	
Year	No.	%	No.	%	No.	%
1912	19	1.81%	1,004	95.89%	24	2.29%
1916	40	3.50%	1,065	93.18%	38	3.32%
1920	296	21.57%	1,076	78.43%	0	0.00%
1924	124	8.48%	1,225	83.79%	113	7.73%
1928	294	19.20%	1,237	80.80%	0	0.00%
1932	57	3.37%	1,619	95.69%	16	0.95%
1936	58	3.00%	1,870	96.69%	6	0.31%
1940	118	6.97%	1,561	92.26%	13	0.77%
1944	194	11.12%	1,550	88.88%	0	0.00%
1948	256	11.94%	1,018	47.48%	870	40.58%
1952	1,068	30.32%	2,455	69.68%	0	0.00%
1956	730	25.36%	2,149	74.64%	0	0.00%
1960	962	29.73%	2,274	70.27%	0	0.00%
1964	3,774	68.61%	1,727	31.39%	0	0.00%
1968	1,383	21.04%	1,701	25.88%	3,489	53.08%
1972	4,533	78.14%	1,268	21.86%	0	0.00%
1976	2,053	27.81%	5,328	72.19%	0	0.00%
1980	2,957	36.69%	4,956	61.49%	147	1.82%
1984	4,607	55.29%	3,725	44.71%	0	0.00%
1988	4,289	55.93%	3,332	43.45%	47	0.61%
1992	3,616	39.44%	4,489	48.96%	1,063	11.59%
1996	3,358	41.64%	4,239	52.57%	467	5.79%
2000	4,847	49.98%	4,748	48.96%	102	1.05%
2004	5,688	50.35%	5,562	49.23%	48	0.42%
2008	5,717	46.65%	6,454	52.66%	84	0.69%
2012	5,378	45.36%	6,375	53.77%	103	0.87%
2016	5,276	47.76%	5,520	49.97%	251	2.27%
2020	5,733	47.19%	6,314	51.97%	103	0.85%
2024	5,869	48.71%	6,136	50.93%	44	0.37%

United States Senate election results for Sumter County, Georgia2
Year	Republican		Democratic		Third party(ies)	
Year	No.	%	No.	%	No.	%
2020	5,743	47.77%	6,114	50.86%	165	1.37%
2020	5,230	47.21%	5,847	52.79%	0	0.00%

United States Senate election results for Sumter County, Georgia3
Year	Republican		Democratic		Third party(ies)	
Year	No.	%	No.	%	No.	%
2020	2,735	22.83%	4,474	37.35%	4,769	39.81%
2020	5,732	47.57%	6,318	52.43%	0	0.00%
2022	4,590	47.91%	4,894	51.09%	96	1.00%
2022	4,203	47.48%	4,649	52.52%	0	0.00%

Georgia Gubernatorial election results for Sumter County
Year	Republican		Democratic		Third party(ies)	
Year	No.	%	No.	%	No.	%
2022	4,921	51.23%	4,650	48.41%	34	0.35%

== Education ==
Sumter County School District operates public schools.

Southland Academy is a private school in Americus.

== See also ==
- National Register of Historic Places listings in Sumter County, Georgia
- List of counties in Georgia
