= Georgia State Route 195 =

State highway in Georgia, United States

State Route 195
- Georgia State Route 195 highlighted in red

Route information
- Maintained by GDOT
- Length: 38.4 mi (61.8 km)
- Existed: 1941–present

Major junctions
- South end: US 19 / SR 3 in Leesburg
- US 280 / SR 30 in Leslie–De Soto
- North end: SR 49 southeast of Andersonville

Location
- Country: United States
- State: Georgia
- Counties: Lee, Sumter

Highway system
- Georgia State Highway System; Interstate; US; State; Special
← SR 194	→ SR 196

State Route 195 (SR 195) is a 38.4-mile-long (61.8 km) state highway in the southwestern part of the U.S. state of Georgia. It runs south-to-north through portions of Lee and Sumter counties parallel to US 19. It once was nearly twice as long, with the northern portion of the highway having been truncated to terminate near Andersonville instead of Reynolds. The southern terminus of the highway is at a junction with US 19 in Leesburg.

== Route description ==
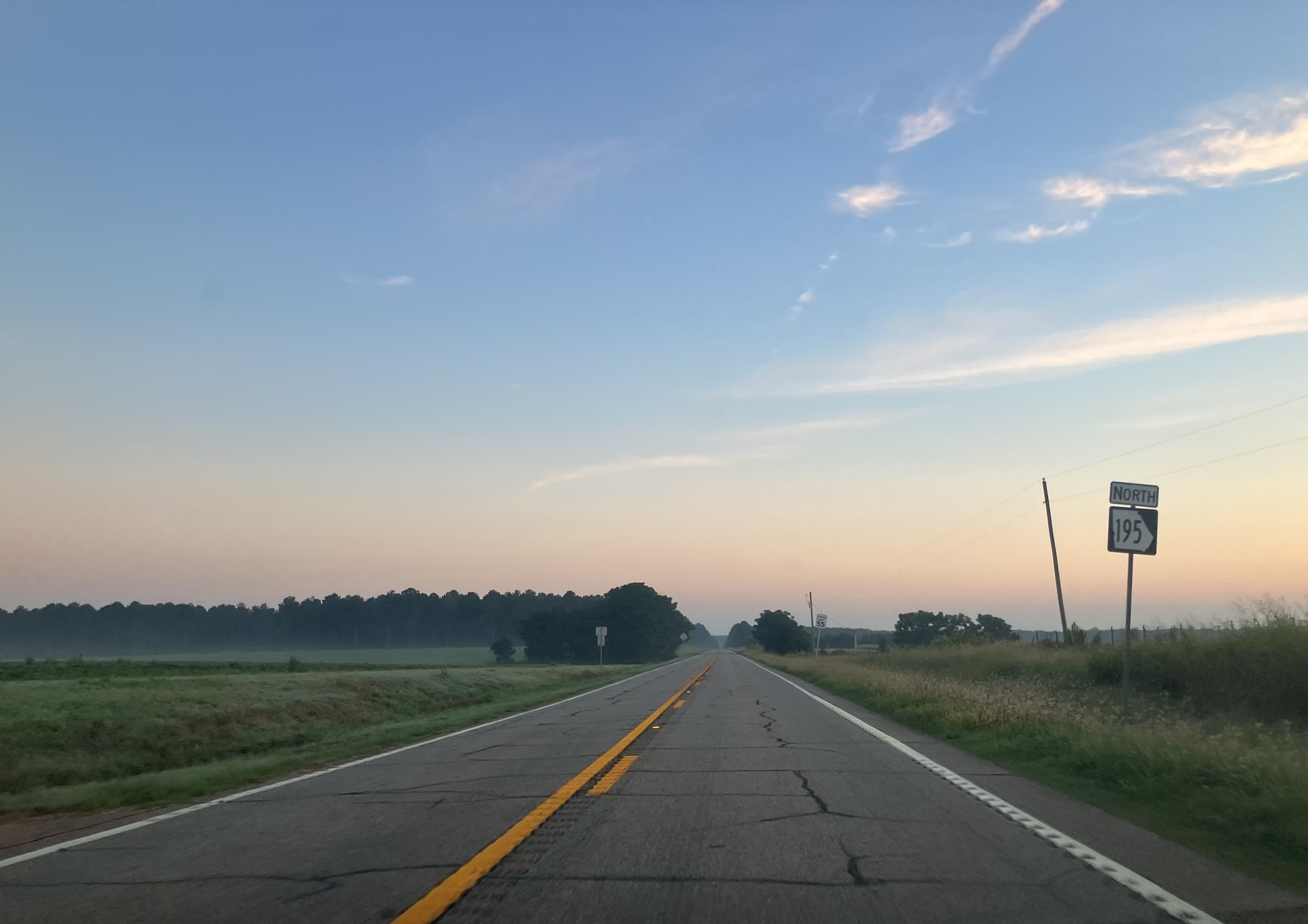
SR 195 north of De Soto

SR 195 begins at an intersection with US 19/SR 3 (Walnut Avenue North) in Leesburg, in Lee County. SR 195 parallels US 19 as an eastern alternate route around Americus for its entire length between Leesburg and SR 49. Within Leesburg it provides the only grade-separated crossing over the Central of Georgia Railway as the highway doubles back over US 19 and then the railway from its starting point. From Leesburg, SR 195 heads northeast to an intersection with SR 377 (Lee Street). It then curves to the north and enters Sumter County.

After entering Sumter County, it reaches Leslie. There, it intersects SR 118 (West Allen Street) which joins SR 195 to meet US 280/SR 30 just 2,000 feet (610 m) to the north. At that intersection SR 118 terminates and SR 195 joins a brief concurrency with US 280 and SR 30 traveling east to neighboring De Soto. In the center of De Soto SR 195 departs from the other routes, heading north out of the city. It runs north through rural parts of the county west of the Flint River. Along this stretch it has a junction with SR 27 (Vienna Road) and continues roughly north and northwest. Passing through the northeastern part of Sumter County, SR 195 travels along a few different roads until it meets its northern terminus, an intersection with SR 49 southeast of Andersonville.

== History ==
SR 195 first appears on Georgia State Highway Department maps in July 1941 as an unimproved twenty mile stretch of road running southwest to northeast between US 19 in Leesburg to US 280/SR 30 in Leslie. By 1944, it was extended to SR 90 at a point north of Oglethorpe. SR 195 was extended to SR 127 by 1948 and to SR 128 in 1950, though that extension was not completed until 1963.

From 1963 until 1982, SR 195 continued north beyond its present-day terminus near Andersonville through Macon County and Taylor County to a junction with SR 128 about two miles south of Reynolds with a length nearly double its current route. South of Andersonville, SR 195 joined SR 49 to Andersonville where SR 195 joined SR 228 instead to exit Andersonville heading northwest. After departing the concurrency with SR 228, SR 195 crossed into Macon County heading north to Fountainville. In Fountainville, SR 195 crossed SR 26 continuing north out of the community to along what is now SR 240. About two miles north of Fountainville, SR 240 previously had its southeastern terminus at a junction with SR 195. About a mile north of that junction, SR 195 met SR 195 Connector, a now-decommissioned short route between SR 195 and SR 240 to the southwest. SR 195 continued north to Ideal where it shared a brief concurrency with SR 90 before exiting to the town heading northeast towards SR 127. SR 195 ran concurrent with SR 128, briefly heading west and crossing into Taylor County before leaving it to travel northeast alone again toward its northern terminus at SR 128 south of Reynolds and SR 96. According to Georgia Department of Transportation maps, the highway had a length of roughly 69 miles (111 km) from Leesburg to SR 128. The highway was removed from these sections on October 1, 1982 with most of them being transferred to local maintenance. The sections of SR 195 decommissioned in 1982 had an approximate length of 32 miles (51 km).

From 1998 to 2015, SR 195's southern terminus was just short of reaching US 19 in Leesburg after its brief concurrency with SR 32 was removed and its terminus moved 200 feet (61 m) to the east at its junction with that highway instead. SR 195 was rerouted to bypass central Leesburg to the north and terminate at US 19 at its current location at the northwestern edge of the city in 2015. The newly-constructed reroute gave Leesburg its only bridge over the Central of Georgia Railway, all other intersecting east to west roads in Leesburg have level crossings with its tracks and the closest one to Leesburg prior to the rerouting was 12 miles (19 km) to the south in Albany.

== Major intersections ==
County	Location	mi	km	Destinations	Notes
Lee	Leesburg	0.0	0.0	US 19 / SR 3 (Walnut Avenue North) – Smithville, Leesburg	Southern terminus
Lee		1.6	2.6	Leslie Highway	Former SR 195
Lee		7.2	11.6	SR 377 north (Lee Street) – Americus	Southern terminus of SR 377
Sumter	Leslie	17.3	27.8	SR 118 west (West Allen Street) – Smithville	Eastern terminus of SR 118
Sumter	Leslie	17.6	28.3	US 280 west / SR 30 west	Southern end of US 280/SR 30 concurrency
Sumter	De Soto	19.2	30.9	US 280 east / SR 30 east	Northern end of US 280/SR 30 concurrency
Sumter		26.4	42.5	SR 27 (Vienna Road) – Americus, Vienna	
Sumter		38.4	61.8	SR 49 – Americus, Andersonville	Northern terminus
1.000 mi = 1.609 km; 1.000 km = 0.621 mi: Concurrency terminus
