= Lee County, Georgia =

County in Georgia, United States

- County
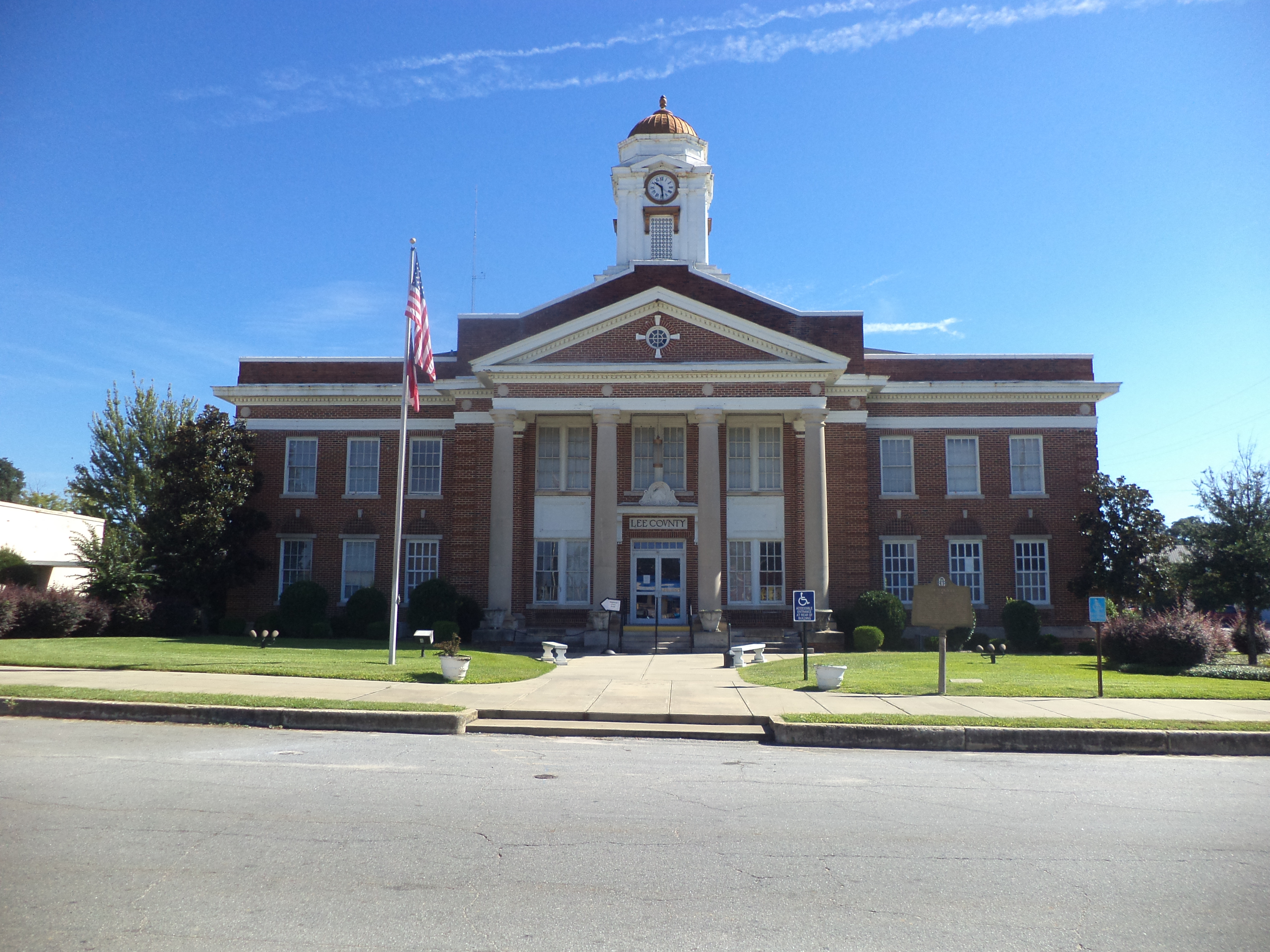
- Lee County courthouse in Leesburg

- Location within the U.S. state of Georgia
- Coordinates: 31.78°N 84.14°W
- Country: United States
- State: Georgia
- Founded: June 9, 1825; 201 years ago
- Named for: Henry Lee III
- Seat: Leesburg
- Largest city: Leesburg

Area
  - Total: 362 sq mi (940 km^{2})
  - Land: 356 sq mi (920 km^{2})
  - Water: 5.9 sq mi (15 km^{2}) 1.6%

Population (2020)
  - Total: 33,163
  - Estimate (2025): 34,179 ▲
  - Density: 93/sq mi (36/km^{2})
- Time zone: UTC−5 (Eastern)
  - Summer (DST): UTC−4 (EDT)
- Congressional district: 2nd
- Website: www.leecountyga.gov

Lee County is a county located in the U.S. state of Georgia. As of the 2020 census, the population was 33,163. The county was established in 1825 and its county seat is Leesburg. Lee County is included in the Albany, Georgia metropolitan area.

== History ==
The land for Lee, Muscogee, Troup, Coweta, and Carroll counties was ceded by the Creek people in the 1825 Treaty of Indian Springs. The counties' boundaries were created by the Georgia General Assembly on June 9, but they were not named until December 14, 1826. The county was named in honor of Henry Lee III, popularly known as "Light-Horse Harry," the father of Confederate general Robert E. Lee. On January 29, 1916, five African American men were lynched; they were taken from the Worth county jail and hanged, their bodies riddled with bullets. The Leesburg Stockade occurred in Lee County.

== Geography ==
According to the U.S. Census Bureau, the county has a total area of 362 square miles (940 km^{2}), of which 356 square miles (920 km^{2}) is land and 5.9 square miles (15 km^{2}) (1.6%) is water. Most of the western three-quarters of Lee County is located in the Kinchafoonee-Muckalee sub-basin of the ACF River Basin (Apalachicola-Chattahoochee-Flint River Basin). The eastern quarter of the county is located in the Middle Flint River sub-basin of the same ACF River Basin, while a very small corner in the south of Lee County is located in the Lower Flint River sub-basin of the same larger ACF River Basin. An even smaller southwestern corner is located in the Ichawaynochaway Creek sub-basin of the ACF River Basin.

=== Major highways ===
- U.S. Route 19 / State Route 3
  - U.S. Route 19 Bypass / State Route 3 Bypass
- U.S. Route 82 / State Route 520
- State Route 32
- State Route 91
- State Route 118
- State Route 133
- State Route 195
- State Route 377

=== Adjacent counties ===
- Sumter County (north)
- Crisp County (northeast)
- Worth County (east)
- Dougherty County (south)
- Terrell County (west)

== Communities ==
- Leesburg (county seat)
- Smithville

== Demographics ==
Historical population
Census	Pop.	Note	%±
1830	1,680		—
1840	4,520		169.0%
1850	6,660		47.3%
1860	7,196		8.0%
1870	9,567		32.9%
1880	10,577		10.6%
1890	9,074		−14.2%
1900	10,344		14.0%
1910	11,679		12.9%
1920	10,904		−6.6%
1930	8,328		−23.6%
1940	7,837		−5.9%
1950	6,674		−14.8%
1960	6,204		−7.0%
1970	7,044		13.5%
1980	11,684		65.9%
1990	16,250		39.1%
2000	24,757		52.4%
2010	28,298		14.3%
2020	33,163		17.2%
2025 (est.)	34,179	▲	3.1%
U.S. Decennial Census; 1790-1880 1890-1910; 1920-1930 1930-1940; 1940-1950 1960-1980; 1980-2000 2010

=== Racial and ethnic composition ===
Lee County, Georgia – Racial and ethnic composition Note: the US Census treats Hispanic/Latino as an ethnic category. This table excludes Latinos from the racial categories and assigns them to a separate category. Hispanics/Latinos may be of any race.
Race / Ethnicity (NH = Non-Hispanic)	Pop 1980	Pop 1990	Pop 2000	Pop 2010	Pop 2020	% 1980	% 1990	% 2000	% 2010	% 2020
White alone (NH)	8,804	12,949	20,203	21,453	22,758	75.35%	79.69%	81.61%	75.81%	68.62%
Black or African American alone (NH)	2,749	3,112	3,823	5,239	7,331	23.53%	19.15%	15.44%	18.51%	22.11%
Native American or Alaska Native alone (NH)	22	30	60	66	57	0.19%	0.18%	0.24%	0.23%	0.17%
Asian alone (NH)	24	44	208	609	850	0.21%	0.27%	0.84%	2.15%	2.56%
Native Hawaiian or Pacific Islander alone (NH)	x	x	3	19	9	x	x	0.01%	0.07%	0.03%
Other race alone (NH)	6	3	11	25	98	0.05%	0.02%	0.04%	0.09%	0.30%
Mixed race or Multiracial (NH)	x	x	149	327	1,107	x	x	0.60%	1.16%	3.34%
Hispanic or Latino (any race)	79	112	300	560	953	0.68%	0.69%	1.21%	1.98%	2.87%
Total	11,684	16,250	24,757	28,298	33,163	100.00%	100.00%	100.00%	100.00%	100.00%

=== 2020 census ===
As of the 2020 census, there were 33,163 people, 11,971 households, and 7,872 families residing in the county. The median age was 38.5 years; 25.6% of residents were under the age of 18 and 14.0% of residents were 65 years of age or older. For every 100 females there were 98.5 males, and for every 100 females age 18 and over there were 95.1 males age 18 and over. 37.6% of residents lived in urban areas, while 62.4% lived in rural areas.

Of the 11,971 households, 39.0% had children under the age of 18 living with them and 25.5% had a female householder with no spouse or partner present. About 21.7% of all households were made up of individuals and 8.9% had someone living alone who was 65 years of age or older.

There were 12,709 housing units, of which 5.8% were vacant. Among occupied housing units, 71.5% were owner-occupied and 28.5% were renter-occupied. The homeowner vacancy rate was 1.5% and the rental vacancy rate was 5.3%.

As of the 2020 census, the racial makeup of the county was 69.3% White, 22.2% Black or African American, 0.2% American Indian and Alaska Native, 2.6% Asian, 0.0% Native Hawaiian and Pacific Islander, 1.1% from some other race, and 4.5% from two or more races. Hispanic or Latino residents of any race comprised 2.9% of the population.

== Education ==
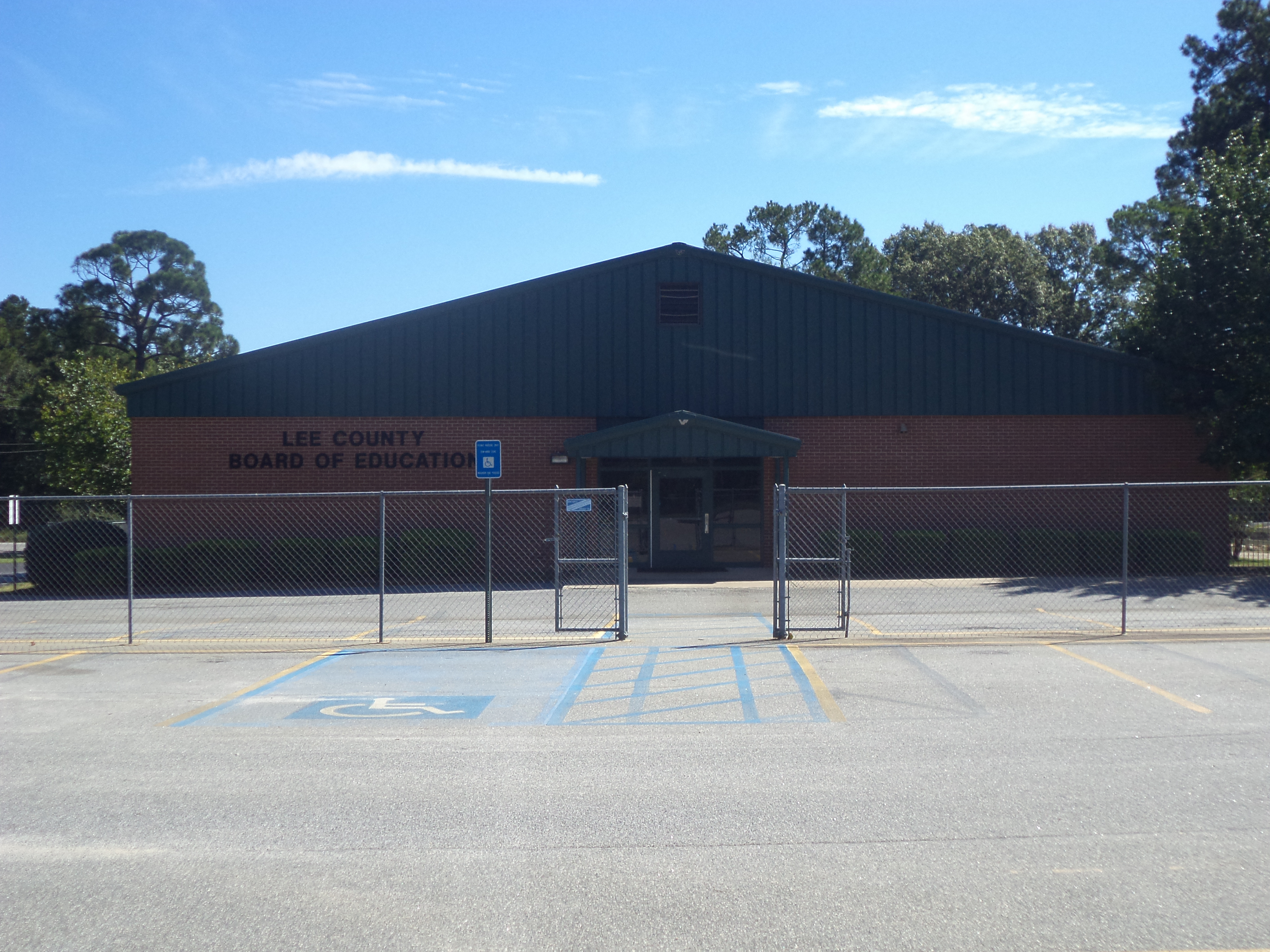
Lee County School District headquarters

Public schools are operated by the Lee County School District. Lee County High School is the sole high school of the district.

== Politics ==
Historically, Lee County was part of the solidly Democratic Solid South where control of the dominant black population dictated unified white voting for Democratic candidates due to the Republican association with Reconstruction and black political power. However, with a combination of the Great Migration and white in-migration, the black share of the county's population has declined and it is now powerfully Republican, having voted Republican in every presidential election since 1964, with the exception of 1968 and 1976 when it backed Southern “favorite sons” George Wallace and Jimmy Carter.

As of the 2020s, Lee County is a Republican stronghold, voting 72% for Donald Trump in 2024. For elections to the United States House of Representatives, Lee County is part of Georgia's 2nd congressional district, currently represented by Sanford Bishop. For elections to the Georgia State Senate, Lee County is part of District 13. For elections to the Georgia House of Representatives, Lee County is part of District 151.

United States presidential election results for Lee County, Georgia
Year	Republican		Democratic		Third party(ies)	
Year	No.	%	No.	%	No.	%
1912	5	2.22%	213	94.67%	7	3.11%
1916	4	1.24%	316	97.83%	3	0.93%
1920	19	7.04%	251	92.96%	0	0.00%
1924	23	9.39%	211	86.12%	11	4.49%
1928	45	13.55%	287	86.45%	0	0.00%
1932	6	2.33%	252	97.67%	0	0.00%
1936	1	0.20%	490	99.59%	1	0.20%
1940	17	3.91%	416	95.63%	2	0.46%
1944	27	5.70%	447	94.30%	0	0.00%
1948	36	7.69%	215	45.94%	217	46.37%
1952	205	34.45%	390	65.55%	0	0.00%
1956	79	12.93%	532	87.07%	0	0.00%
1960	191	32.10%	404	67.90%	0	0.00%
1964	1,041	81.01%	244	18.99%	0	0.00%
1968	389	17.18%	674	29.77%	1,201	53.05%
1972	1,441	78.70%	390	21.30%	0	0.00%
1976	1,110	39.13%	1,727	60.87%	0	0.00%
1980	1,942	53.05%	1,670	45.62%	49	1.34%
1984	2,972	69.83%	1,284	30.17%	0	0.00%
1988	2,875	74.04%	995	25.62%	13	0.33%
1992	3,061	51.81%	1,811	30.65%	1,036	17.54%
1996	3,983	61.15%	2,005	30.78%	525	8.06%
2000	5,872	74.48%	1,936	24.56%	76	0.96%
2004	8,201	78.64%	2,182	20.92%	45	0.43%
2008	9,925	75.69%	3,100	23.64%	87	0.66%
2012	10,314	75.58%	3,196	23.42%	136	1.00%
2016	10,646	74.73%	3,170	22.25%	430	3.02%
2020	12,007	71.82%	4,558	27.26%	154	0.92%
2024	12,655	71.57%	4,957	28.03%	71	0.40%

United States Senate election results for Lee County, Georgia2
Year	Republican		Democratic		Third party(ies)	
Year	No.	%	No.	%	No.	%
2020	11,862	71.63%	4,424	26.72%	273	1.65%
2020	10,665	71.63%	4,225	28.37%	0	0.00%

United States Senate election results for Lee County, Georgia3
Year	Republican		Democratic		Third party(ies)	
Year	No.	%	No.	%	No.	%
2020	6,365	38.70%	2,970	18.06%	7,112	43.24%
2020	10,657	71.54%	4,240	28.46%	0	0.00%
2022	9,535	70.45%	3,779	27.92%	221	1.63%
2022	8,743	71.05%	3,562	28.95%	0	0.00%

Georgia Gubernatorial election results for Lee County
Year	Republican		Democratic		Third party(ies)	
Year	No.	%	No.	%	No.	%
2022	10,094	74.29%	3,413	25.12%	80	0.59%

== See also ==
- National Register of Historic Places listings in Lee County, Georgia
- List of counties in Georgia
