= 1940 United States presidential election in Georgia =

- November 5, 1940

Nominee	Franklin Roosevelt	Wendell Willkie
Party	Democratic	Republican
Home state	New York	New York
Running mate	Henry A. Wallace	Charles L. McNary
Electoral vote	12	0
Popular vote	265,194	46,360
Percentage	84.85%	14.83%
County results
Roosevelt
50–60%
60–70%
70–80%
80–90%
90–100%
Willkie
50–60%
President before election
Franklin Roosevelt
Democratic
Elected President
Franklin Roosevelt
Democratic

The 1940 United States presidential election in Georgia took place on November 5, 1940, as part of the wider United States presidential election. Voters chose 12 representatives, or electors, to the Electoral College, who voted for president and vice president.

With the exception of a handful of historically Unionist North Georgia counties – chiefly Fannin but also to a lesser extent Pickens, Gilmer and Towns – Georgia since the 1880s had been a one-party state dominated by the Democratic Party. Disfranchisement of almost all African-Americans and most poor whites had made the Republican Party virtually nonexistent outside of local governments in those few hill counties, and the national Democratic Party served as the guardian of white supremacy against a Republican Party historically associated with memories of Reconstruction. The only competitive elections were Democratic primaries, which state laws restricted to whites on the grounds of the Democratic Party being legally a private club.

Secretary of State John B. Wilson refused to allow Earl Browder, the nominee of the Communist Party USA, to appear on the ballot stating that the party was in violation of a Georgian law which prohibited "candidates of a party which seeks to overthrow our democratic constitutional form of government" from appearing on the ballot. The Georgia General Assembly later passed restrictive ballot access legislation in 1943, which required petitions to have signatures from at least five percent of registered voters. The Atlanta Journal-Constitution stated that the legislation was passed in order to "sustain Secretary of State John B. Wilson in refusing a Communist candidate for president a place on the Georgia ballot in the 1940 election". Georgia would later lower its voting age from twenty-one to eighteen in 1943.

== Results ==
1940 United States presidential election in Georgia
Party	Candidate	Votes	Percentage	Electoral votes
Democratic	Franklin Roosevelt (incumbent)	265,194	84.85%	12
Republican	Wendell Willkie	46,360 (Note: Willkie vote is a fusion of 23,932 Republican and 22,428 Independent votes.)	14.83%	0
Prohibition	Roger Babson	983	0.31%	0
Independent		14	0.00%	0

=== Results by county ===
County	Franklin Delano Roosevelt Democratic		Wendell Lewis Willkie Republican/Independent		Roger Ward Babson Prohibition		Write-ins Independent		Margin		Total votes cast
County	#	%	#	%	#	%	#	%	#	%	Total votes cast
Appling	1,514	82.19%	312	16.94%	16	0.87%	0	0.00%	1,202	65.26%	1,842
Atkinson	703	91.30%	66	8.57%	1	0.13%	0	0.00%	637	82.73%	770
Bacon	821	88.95%	97	10.51%	5	0.54%	0	0.00%	724	78.44%	923
Baker	557	94.73%	30	5.10%	1	0.17%	0	0.00%	527	89.63%	588
Baldwin	1,313	86.38%	203	13.36%	4	0.26%	0	0.00%	1,110	73.03%	1,520
Banks	668	79.71%	164	19.57%	6	0.72%	0	0.00%	504	60.14%	838
Barrow	1,615	87.82%	219	11.91%	5	0.27%	0	0.00%	1,396	75.91%	1,839
Bartow	1,734	84.17%	318	15.44%	8	0.39%	0	0.00%	1,416	68.74%	2,060
Ben Hill	1,206	86.64%	181	13.00%	4	0.29%	1	0.07%	1,025	73.64%	1,392
Berrien	1,156	97.97%	23	1.95%	1	0.08%	0	0.00%	1,133	96.02%	1,180
Bibb	6,729	82.70%	1,371	16.85%	37	0.45%	0	0.00%	5,358	65.85%	8,137
Bleckley	785	88.40%	100	11.26%	3	0.34%	0	0.00%	685	77.14%	888
Brantley	960	93.20%	67	6.50%	3	0.29%	0	0.00%	893	86.70%	1,030
Brooks	1,300	83.93%	248	16.01%	1	0.06%	0	0.00%	1,052	67.91%	1,549
Bryan	874	94.49%	49	5.30%	2	0.22%	0	0.00%	825	89.19%	925
Bulloch	2,063	93.35%	141	6.38%	6	0.27%	0	0.00%	1,922	86.97%	2,210
Burke	1,029	95.54%	42	3.90%	6	0.56%	0	0.00%	987	91.64%	1,077
Butts	1,012	91.92%	87	7.90%	2	0.18%	0	0.00%	925	84.01%	1,101
Calhoun	610	94.87%	33	5.13%	0	0.00%	0	0.00%	577	89.74%	643
Camden	564	90.24%	60	9.60%	1	0.16%	0	0.00%	504	80.64%	625
Candler	748	92.00%	63	7.75%	2	0.25%	0	0.00%	685	84.26%	813
Carroll	3,808	85.92%	616	13.90%	8	0.18%	0	0.00%	3,192	72.02%	4,432
Catoosa	1,440	85.26%	249	14.74%	0	0.00%	0	0.00%	1,191	70.52%	1,689
Charlton	562	90.35%	60	9.65%	0	0.00%	0	0.00%	502	80.71%	622
Chatham	10,048	83.37%	1,985	16.47%	19	0.16%	0	0.00%	8,063	66.90%	12,052
Chattahoochee	204	91.07%	20	8.93%	0	0.00%	0	0.00%	184	82.14%	224
Chattooga	2,413	89.47%	273	10.12%	11	0.41%	0	0.00%	2,140	79.35%	2,697
Cherokee	1,552	60.11%	1,017	39.39%	13	0.50%	0	0.00%	535	20.72%	2,582
Clarke	2,894	91.87%	246	7.81%	10	0.32%	0	0.00%	2,648	84.06%	3,150
Clay	488	93.31%	33	6.31%	2	0.38%	0	0.00%	455	87.00%	523
Clayton	1,382	89.45%	161	10.42%	2	0.13%	0	0.00%	1,221	79.03%	1,545
Clinch	1,049	94.33%	63	5.67%	0	0.00%	0	0.00%	986	88.67%	1,112
Cobb	4,447	81.63%	992	18.21%	9	0.17%	0	0.00%	3,455	63.42%	5,448
Coffee	1,561	92.15%	128	7.56%	5	0.30%	0	0.00%	1,433	84.59%	1,694
Colquitt	1,819	77.04%	525	22.24%	17	0.72%	0	0.00%	1,294	54.81%	2,361
Columbia	627	92.61%	46	6.79%	4	0.59%	0	0.00%	581	85.82%	677
Cook	941	86.81%	143	13.19%	0	0.00%	0	0.00%	798	73.62%	1,084
Coweta	2,846	96.25%	103	3.48%	8	0.27%	0	0.00%	2,743	92.76%	2,957
Crawford	362	82.84%	74	16.93%	1	0.23%	0	0.00%	288	65.90%	437
Crisp	1,049	88.75%	129	10.91%	4	0.34%	0	0.00%	920	77.83%	1,182
Dade	982	86.67%	151	13.33%	0	0.00%	0	0.00%	831	73.35%	1,133
Dawson	484	63.43%	276	36.17%	3	0.39%	0	0.00%	208	27.26%	763
Decatur	1,781	89.05%	217	10.85%	2	0.10%	0	0.00%	1,564	78.20%	2,000
DeKalb	8,862	80.65%	2,081	18.94%	45	0.41%	0	0.00%	6,781	61.71%	10,988
Dodge	1,280	87.91%	171	11.74%	5	0.34%	0	0.00%	1,109	76.17%	1,456
Dooly	1,209	90.43%	124	9.27%	4	0.30%	0	0.00%	1,085	81.15%	1,337
Dougherty	2,175	92.32%	180	7.64%	1	0.04%	0	0.00%	1,995	84.68%	2,356
Douglas	833	80.64%	195	18.88%	5	0.48%	0	0.00%	638	61.76%	1,033
Early	1,751	94.29%	104	5.60%	2	0.11%	0	0.00%	1,647	88.69%	1,857
Echols	441	95.87%	18	3.91%	1	0.22%	0	0.00%	423	91.96%	460
Effingham	633	73.60%	227	26.40%	0	0.00%	0	0.00%	406	47.21%	860
Elbert	2,052	84.48%	357	14.70%	20	0.82%	0	0.00%	1,695	69.78%	2,429
Emanuel	1,428	94.51%	81	5.36%	2	0.13%	0	0.00%	1,347	89.15%	1,511
Evans	1,399	92.04%	112	7.37%	9	0.59%	0	0.00%	1,287	84.67%	1,520
Fannin	1,771	43.98%	2,256	56.02%	0	0.00%	0	0.00%	-485	-12.04%	4,027
Fayette	577	92.91%	44	7.09%	0	0.00%	0	0.00%	533	85.83%	621
Floyd	5,528	85.56%	912	14.12%	21	0.33%	0	0.00%	4,616	71.44%	6,461
Forsyth	1,378	68.49%	634	31.51%	0	0.00%	0	0.00%	744	36.98%	2,012
Franklin	1,579	86.66%	222	12.18%	21	1.15%	0	0.00%	1,357	74.48%	1,822
Fulton	31,311	83.57%	6,033	16.10%	122	0.33%	0	0.00%	25,278	67.47%	37,466
Gilmer	856	56.61%	653	43.19%	3	0.20%	0	0.00%	203	13.43%	1,512
Glascock	332	80.98%	76	18.54%	2	0.49%	0	0.00%	256	62.44%	410
Glynn	2,014	87.76%	274	11.94%	7	0.31%	0	0.00%	1,740	75.82%	2,295
Gordon	1,623	75.17%	527	24.41%	9	0.42%	0	0.00%	1,096	50.76%	2,159
Grady	1,461	86.09%	224	13.20%	12	0.71%	0	0.00%	1,237	72.89%	1,697
Greene	1,497	90.29%	148	8.93%	13	0.78%	0	0.00%	1,349	81.36%	1,658
Gwinnett	4,023	84.32%	728	15.26%	20	0.42%	0	0.00%	3,295	69.06%	4,771
Habersham	1,840	81.06%	421	18.55%	9	0.40%	0	0.00%	1,419	62.51%	2,270
Hall	2,943	85.13%	513	14.84%	1	0.03%	0	0.00%	2,430	70.29%	3,457
Hancock	501	76.49%	153	23.36%	1	0.15%	0	0.00%	348	53.13%	655
Haralson	1,397	75.19%	457	24.60%	4	0.22%	0	0.00%	940	50.59%	1,858
Harris	914	92.04%	71	7.15%	8	0.81%	0	0.00%	843	84.89%	993
Hart	1,328	92.16%	97	6.73%	16	1.11%	0	0.00%	1,231	85.43%	1,441
Heard	647	74.37%	221	25.40%	2	0.23%	0	0.00%	426	48.97%	870
Henry	1,551	93.77%	101	6.11%	2	0.12%	0	0.00%	1,450	87.67%	1,654
Houston	622	80.57%	149	19.30%	1	0.13%	0	0.00%	473	61.27%	772
Irwin	962	82.79%	197	16.95%	3	0.26%	0	0.00%	765	65.83%	1,162
Jackson	1,599	90.29%	166	9.37%	6	0.34%	0	0.00%	1,433	80.91%	1,771
Jasper	689	90.30%	72	9.44%	2	0.26%	0	0.00%	617	80.87%	763
Jeff Davis	696	87.11%	101	12.64%	2	0.25%	0	0.00%	595	74.47%	799
Jefferson	1,068	86.13%	171	13.79%	1	0.08%	0	0.00%	897	72.34%	1,240
Jenkins	940	92.98%	69	6.82%	2	0.20%	0	0.00%	871	86.15%	1,011
Johnson	2,386	88.24%	306	11.32%	12	0.44%	0	0.00%	2,080	76.92%	2,704
Jones	613	85.73%	101	14.13%	1	0.14%	0	0.00%	512	71.61%	715
Lamar	869	90.62%	85	8.86%	5	0.52%	0	0.00%	784	81.75%	959
Lanier	607	97.12%	16	2.56%	2	0.32%	0	0.00%	591	94.56%	625
Laurens	2,316	84.07%	435	15.79%	4	0.15%	0	0.00%	1,881	68.28%	2,755
Lee	416	95.63%	17	3.91%	2	0.46%	0	0.00%	399	91.72%	435
Liberty	407	79.80%	102	20.00%	1	0.20%	0	0.00%	305	59.80%	510
Lincoln	466	86.62%	67	12.45%	3	0.56%	2	0.37%	399	74.16%	538
Long	319	80.35%	76	19.14%	2	0.50%	0	0.00%	243	61.21%	397
Lowndes	2,551	90.40%	260	9.21%	11	0.39%	0	0.00%	2,291	81.18%	2,822
Lumpkin	889	84.11%	165	15.61%	3	0.28%	0	0.00%	724	68.50%	1,057
Macon	852	91.81%	72	7.76%	4	0.43%	0	0.00%	780	84.05%	928
Madison	1,160	85.36%	185	13.61%	14	1.03%	0	0.00%	975	71.74%	1,359
Marion	605	88.58%	77	11.27%	1	0.15%	0	0.00%	528	77.31%	683
McDuffie	959	92.12%	75	7.20%	7	0.67%	0	0.00%	884	84.92%	1,041
McIntosh	468	81.53%	106	18.47%	0	0.00%	0	0.00%	362	63.07%	574
Meriwether	2,726	93.74%	174	5.98%	8	0.28%	0	0.00%	2,552	87.76%	2,908
Miller	775	93.94%	50	6.06%	0	0.00%	0	0.00%	725	87.88%	825
Mitchell	2,131	93.22%	155	6.78%	0	0.00%	0	0.00%	1,976	86.44%	2,286
Monroe	1,016	94.86%	49	4.58%	6	0.56%	0	0.00%	967	90.29%	1,071
Montgomery	686	89.44%	75	9.78%	6	0.78%	0	0.00%	611	79.66%	767
Morgan	484	95.28%	24	4.72%	0	0.00%	0	0.00%	460	90.55%	508
Murray	1,399	71.89%	545	28.01%	2	0.10%	0	0.00%	854	43.88%	1,946
Muscogee	5,392	88.38%	702	11.51%	7	0.11%	0	0.00%	4,690	76.87%	6,101
Newton	1,512	93.85%	95	5.90%	4	0.25%	0	0.00%	1,417	87.96%	1,611
Oconee	635	77.72%	177	21.66%	5	0.61%	0	0.00%	458	56.06%	817
Oglethorpe	818	86.11%	131	13.79%	1	0.11%	0	0.00%	687	72.32%	950
Paulding	1,653	67.89%	770	31.62%	12	0.49%	0	0.00%	883	36.26%	2,435
Peach	738	82.09%	155	17.24%	6	0.67%	0	0.00%	583	64.85%	899
Pickens	1,124	55.64%	884	43.76%	12	0.59%	0	0.00%	240	11.88%	2,020
Pierce	943	91.55%	84	8.16%	3	0.29%	0	0.00%	859	83.40%	1,030
Pike	829	79.87%	209	20.13%	0	0.00%	0	0.00%	620	59.73%	1,038
Polk	2,693	86.76%	401	12.92%	10	0.32%	0	0.00%	2,292	73.84%	3,104
Pulaski	478	91.92%	38	7.31%	4	0.77%	0	0.00%	440	84.62%	520
Putnam	730	92.17%	61	7.70%	1	0.13%	0	0.00%	669	84.47%	792
Quitman	324	94.46%	19	5.54%	0	0.00%	0	0.00%	305	88.92%	343
Rabun	958	91.85%	82	7.86%	3	0.29%	0	0.00%	876	83.99%	1,043
Randolph	1,298	89.95%	143	9.91%	2	0.14%	0	0.00%	1,155	80.04%	1,443
Richmond	5,855	89.97%	641	9.85%	8	0.12%	4	0.06%	5,214	80.12%	6,508
Rockdale	1,291	93.55%	86	6.23%	3	0.22%	0	0.00%	1,205	87.32%	1,380
Schley	471	86.90%	69	12.73%	2	0.37%	0	0.00%	402	74.17%	542
Screven	1,174	91.79%	100	7.82%	5	0.39%	0	0.00%	1,074	83.97%	1,279
Seminole	884	93.45%	58	6.13%	3	0.32%	1	0.11%	826	87.32%	946
Spalding	3,022	93.76%	197	6.11%	4	0.12%	0	0.00%	2,825	87.65%	3,223
Stephens	1,084	91.71%	90	7.61%	6	0.51%	2	0.17%	994	84.09%	1,182
Stewart	600	92.02%	52	7.98%	0	0.00%	0	0.00%	548	84.05%	652
Sumter	1,561	92.26%	118	6.97%	13	0.77%	0	0.00%	1,443	85.28%	1,692
Talbot	656	92.92%	49	6.94%	1	0.14%	0	0.00%	607	85.98%	706
Taliaferro	507	96.39%	19	3.61%	0	0.00%	0	0.00%	488	92.78%	526
Tattnall	1,246	74.43%	421	25.15%	7	0.42%	0	0.00%	825	49.28%	1,674
Taylor	796	78.73%	213	21.07%	2	0.20%	0	0.00%	583	57.67%	1,011
Telfair	1,391	92.24%	104	6.90%	13	0.86%	0	0.00%	1,287	85.34%	1,508
Terrell	1,040	100.00%	0	0.00%	0	0.00%	0	0.00%	1,040	100.00%	1,040
Thomas	2,072	84.64%	371	15.16%	5	0.20%	0	0.00%	1,701	69.49%	2,448
Tift	1,463	85.51%	226	13.21%	22	1.29%	0	0.00%	1,237	72.30%	1,711
Toombs	1,061	88.79%	134	11.21%	0	0.00%	0	0.00%	927	77.57%	1,195
Towns	894	51.86%	830	48.14%	0	0.00%	0	0.00%	64	3.71%	1,724
Treutlen	1,184	96.89%	38	3.11%	0	0.00%	0	0.00%	1,146	93.78%	1,222
Troup	3,176	91.34%	288	8.28%	13	0.37%	0	0.00%	2,888	83.06%	3,477
Turner	791	68.96%	351	30.60%	5	0.44%	0	0.00%	440	38.36%	1,147
Twiggs	723	88.82%	91	11.18%	0	0.00%	0	0.00%	632	77.64%	814
Union	950	62.96%	557	36.91%	2	0.13%	0	0.00%	393	26.04%	1,509
Upson	2,235	93.36%	159	6.64%	0	0.00%	0	0.00%	2,076	86.72%	2,394
Walker	2,859	83.50%	558	16.30%	7	0.20%	0	0.00%	2,301	67.20%	3,424
Walton	2,179	95.24%	104	4.55%	5	0.22%	0	0.00%	2,075	90.69%	2,288
Ware	2,672	89.48%	308	10.31%	6	0.20%	0	0.00%	2,364	79.17%	2,986
Warren	606	86.20%	95	13.51%	2	0.28%	0	0.00%	511	72.69%	703
Washington	1,112	80.93%	253	18.41%	9	0.66%	0	0.00%	859	62.52%	1,374
Wayne	1,542	89.39%	179	10.38%	4	0.23%	0	0.00%	1,363	79.01%	1,725
Webster	280	84.85%	50	15.15%	0	0.00%	0	0.00%	230	69.70%	330
Wheeler	495	80.49%	117	19.02%	3	0.49%	0	0.00%	378	61.46%	615
White	754	87.17%	111	12.83%	0	0.00%	0	0.00%	643	74.34%	865
Whitfield	3,162	76.03%	991	23.83%	6	0.14%	0	0.00%	2,171	52.20%	4,159
Wilcox	890	87.51%	118	11.60%	9	0.88%	0	0.00%	772	75.91%	1,017
Wilkes	1,022	88.72%	123	10.68%	7	0.61%	0	0.00%	899	78.04%	1,152
Wilkinson	906	85.96%	147	13.95%	1	0.09%	0	0.00%	759	72.01%	1,054
Worth	936	82.91%	190	16.83%	3	0.27%	0	0.00%	746	66.08%	1,129
Totals	265,194	84.81%	46,495	14.87%	983	0.31%	14	0.00%	218,699	69.94%	312,686
