= Georgia Rural Telephone Museum =

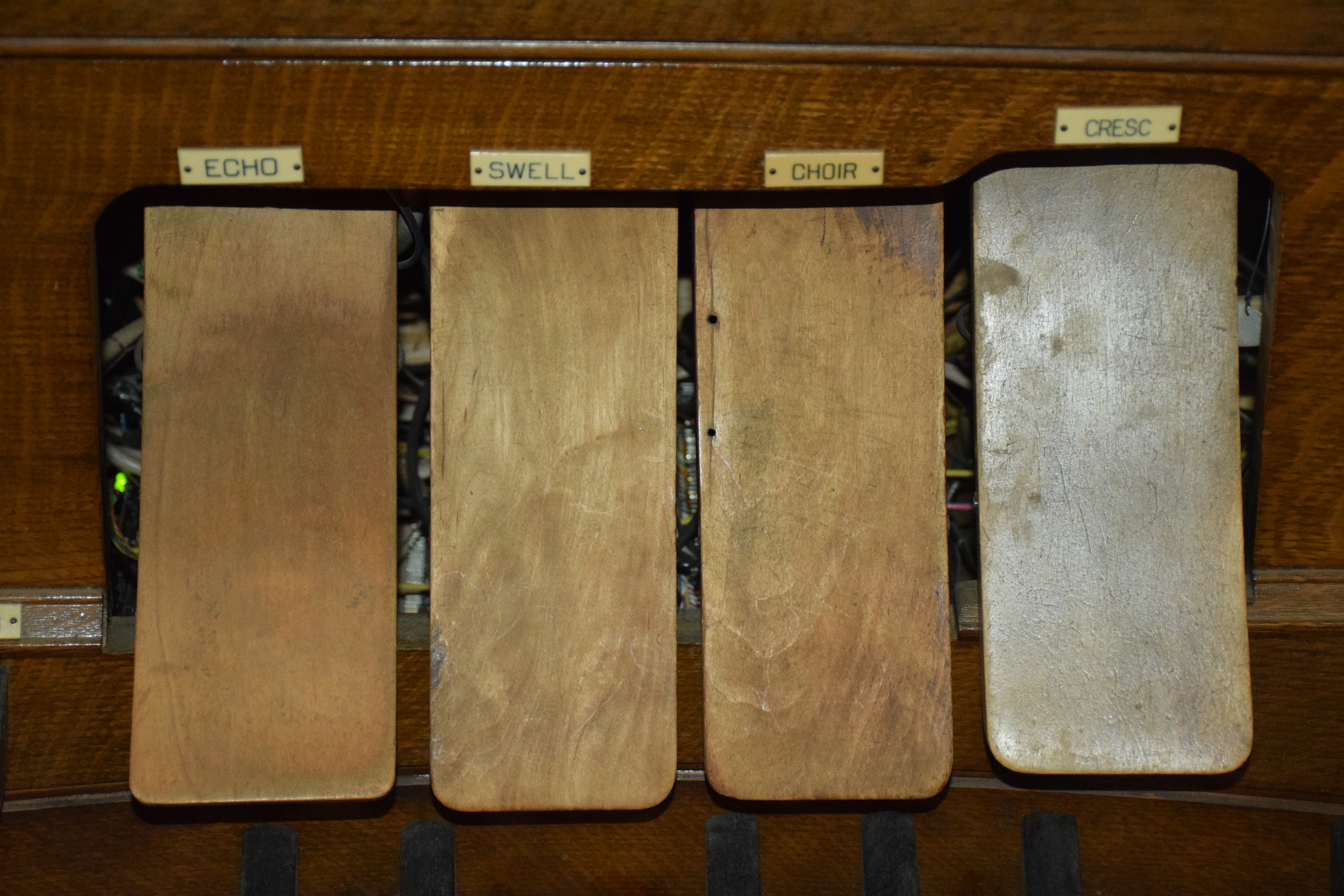
- Organ
- Established: 1995
- Location: Leslie, Georgia
- Coordinates: 31.95605°N 84.08666°W
- Type: Telephone and telephone memorabilia museum
- Collection size: 2000
- Founder: Tommy C. Smith
- Website: Official website

The Georgia Rural Telephone Museum (GRTM) is a telephone and telephone memorabilia museum located in Leslie, Georgia, United States. Housed in a renovated 1910s cotton warehouse, the GRTM is, according to 2007's Georgia Curiosities, "one of the world's largest phone museums." According to the museum itself, the size of its collection of telephones is unparalleled.

Located at 135 North Bailey Avenue, Leslie, Georgia, the GRTM is a not for profit organization. It was founded in 1995 by Tommy C. Smith. As of 2007, the museum featured 2,000 artifacts on exhibit, dating back to the 1880s.
