= 1944 United States presidential election in Georgia =

- November 7, 1944

Nominee	Franklin D. Roosevelt	Thomas E. Dewey
Party	Democratic	Republican
Home state	New York	New York
Running mate	Harry S. Truman	John W. Bricker
Electoral vote	12	0
Popular vote	268,187	59,880
Percentage	81.74%	18.25%
County results
Roosevelt
50–60%
60–70%
70–80%
80–90%
90–100%
Dewey
50–60%
60–70%
President before election
Franklin Roosevelt
Democratic
Elected President
Franklin Roosevelt
Democratic

The 1944 United States presidential election in Georgia took place on November 7, 1944, as part of the wider United States presidential election. Voters chose 12 representatives, or electors, to the Electoral College, who voted for president and vice president.

With the exception of a handful of historically Unionist North Georgia counties – chiefly Fannin but also to a lesser extent Pickens, Gilmer and Towns – Georgia since the 1880s had been a one-party state dominated by the Democratic Party. Disfranchisement of almost all African-Americans and most poor whites had made the Republican Party virtually nonexistent outside of local governments in those few hill counties, and the national Democratic Party served as the guardian of white supremacy against a Republican Party historically associated with memories of Reconstruction. The only competitive elections were Democratic primaries, which state laws restricted to whites on the grounds of the Democratic Party being legally a private club.

1944 saw the beginning of the breakdown of this single-party political system when the Supreme Court in Smith v. Allwright ruled against the white primary system. During the period between Smith and the 1944 election, further challenges from blacks occurred after the state announced that coming primaries would remain all-white. Despite some opposition amongst the Southern ruling elite to Roosevelt – mitigated by the replacement of Henry A. Wallace as vice-presidential nominee – the incumbent president again overwhelmingly carried the state, losing only 3 percent on his 1940 vote share.

Georgia had lowered its voting age from twenty-one to eighteen in 1943.

== Results ==
1944 United States presidential election in Georgia
Party	Candidate	Votes	Percentage	Electoral votes
Democratic	Franklin Roosevelt (incumbent)	268,187	81.74%	12
Republican	Thomas E. Dewey	59,880 (Note: Dewey total is a fusion of 56,507 Republican votes and 3,373 votes cast by a slate of "Independent Democrats".)	18.25%	0
Prohibition	Claude Watson	36	0.01%	0
Socialist	Norman Thomas	6	0.00%	0

=== Results by county ===
County	Franklin Delano Roosevelt Democratic		Thomas Edmund Dewey Republican/Independent Democratic		Various candidates Other parties		Margin		Total votes cast
County	#	%	#	%	#	%	#	%	Total votes cast
Appling	1,318	77.30%	387	22.70%	0	0.00%	931	54.60%	1,705
Atkinson	766	89.49%	90	10.51%	0	0.00%	676	78.97%	856
Bacon	763	77.62%	220	22.38%	0	0.00%	543	55.24%	983
Baker	478	93.91%	31	6.09%	0	0.00%	447	87.82%	509
Baldwin	1,307	80.98%	307	19.02%	0	0.00%	1,000	61.96%	1,614
Banks	490	79.16%	125	20.19%	4	0.65%	365	58.97%	619
Barrow	1,513	85.48%	257	14.52%	0	0.00%	1,256	70.96%	1,770
Bartow	1,915	79.10%	506	20.90%	0	0.00%	1,409	58.20%	2,421
Ben Hill	1,046	84.56%	190	15.36%	1	0.08%	856	69.20%	1,237
Berrien	1,481	87.22%	217	12.78%	0	0.00%	1,264	74.44%	1,698
Bibb	5,352	73.96%	1,884	26.04%	0	0.00%	3,468	47.93%	7,236
Bleckley	815	79.28%	213	20.72%	0	0.00%	602	58.56%	1,028
Brantley	540	81.33%	124	18.67%	0	0.00%	416	62.65%	664
Brooks	1,381	83.19%	279	16.81%	0	0.00%	1,102	66.39%	1,660
Bryan	688	88.43%	90	11.57%	0	0.00%	598	76.86%	778
Bulloch	1,921	87.52%	274	12.48%	0	0.00%	1,647	75.03%	2,195
Burke	909	85.59%	153	14.41%	0	0.00%	756	71.19%	1,062
Butts	1,330	93.99%	85	6.01%	0	0.00%	1,245	87.99%	1,415
Calhoun	736	95.21%	37	4.79%	0	0.00%	699	90.43%	773
Camden	556	87.97%	76	12.03%	0	0.00%	480	75.95%	632
Candler	653	82.55%	138	17.45%	0	0.00%	515	65.11%	791
Carroll	3,331	82.55%	704	17.45%	0	0.00%	2,627	65.11%	4,035
Catoosa	1,453	78.63%	395	21.37%	0	0.00%	1,058	57.25%	1,848
Charlton	462	83.85%	89	16.15%	0	0.00%	373	67.70%	551
Chatham	8,725	80.91%	2,058	19.09%	0	0.00%	6,667	61.83%	10,783
Chattahoochee	100	84.03%	19	15.97%	0	0.00%	81	68.07%	119
Chattooga	2,495	89.68%	287	10.32%	0	0.00%	2,208	79.37%	2,782
Cherokee	1,348	56.00%	1,059	44.00%	0	0.00%	289	12.01%	2,407
Clarke	3,112	91.91%	274	8.09%	0	0.00%	2,838	83.82%	3,386
Clay	442	92.66%	35	7.34%	0	0.00%	407	85.32%	477
Clayton	1,828	88.14%	245	11.81%	1	0.05%	1,583	76.33%	2,074
Clinch	582	90.09%	64	9.91%	0	0.00%	518	80.19%	646
Cobb	5,000	78.75%	1,349	21.25%	0	0.00%	3,651	57.51%	6,349
Coffee	1,625	81.62%	366	18.38%	0	0.00%	1,259	63.23%	1,991
Colquitt	2,308	76.83%	696	23.17%	0	0.00%	1,612	53.66%	3,004
Columbia	508	87.59%	72	12.41%	0	0.00%	436	75.17%	580
Cook	1,155	84.99%	204	15.01%	0	0.00%	951	69.98%	1,359
Coweta	2,649	95.32%	130	4.68%	0	0.00%	2,519	90.64%	2,779
Crawford	375	71.56%	149	28.44%	0	0.00%	226	43.13%	524
Crisp	1,199	84.68%	217	15.32%	0	0.00%	982	69.35%	1,416
Dade	943	84.80%	169	15.20%	0	0.00%	774	69.60%	1,112
Dawson	469	57.83%	342	42.17%	0	0.00%	127	15.66%	811
De Kalb	12,069	82.52%	2,555	17.47%	1	0.01%	9,514	65.05%	14,625
Decatur	1,606	84.53%	294	15.47%	0	0.00%	1,312	69.05%	1,900
Dodge	1,437	85.84%	237	14.16%	0	0.00%	1,200	71.68%	1,674
Dooly	845	90.67%	87	9.33%	0	0.00%	758	81.33%	932
Dougherty	3,199	90.44%	338	9.56%	0	0.00%	2,861	80.89%	3,537
Douglas	828	74.73%	280	25.27%	0	0.00%	548	49.46%	1,108
Early	1,753	95.79%	77	4.21%	0	0.00%	1,676	91.58%	1,830
Echols	466	91.73%	42	8.27%	0	0.00%	424	83.46%	508
Effingham	433	54.26%	365	45.74%	0	0.00%	68	8.52%	798
Elbert	1,564	80.79%	370	19.11%	2	0.10%	1,194	61.67%	1,936
Emanuel	1,635	83.72%	317	16.23%	1	0.05%	1,318	67.49%	1,953
Evans	756	86.50%	117	13.39%	1	0.11%	639	73.11%	874
Fannin	1,298	39.60%	1,980	60.40%	0	0.00%	-682	-20.81%	3,278
Fayette	782	88.86%	98	11.14%	0	0.00%	684	77.73%	880
Floyd	4,764	80.92%	1,123	19.08%	0	0.00%	3,641	61.85%	5,887
Forsyth	1,047	60.10%	695	39.90%	0	0.00%	352	20.21%	1,742
Franklin	1,377	80.76%	328	19.24%	0	0.00%	1,049	61.52%	1,705
Fulton	37,161	82.86%	7,687	17.14%	0	0.00%	29,474	65.72%	44,848
Gilmer	884	52.71%	793	47.29%	0	0.00%	91	5.43%	1,677
Glascock	318	66.39%	161	33.61%	0	0.00%	157	32.78%	479
Glynn	1,995	83.82%	385	16.18%	0	0.00%	1,610	67.65%	2,380
Gordon	1,457	70.22%	617	29.73%	1	0.05%	840	40.48%	2,075
Grady	1,661	88.16%	223	11.84%	0	0.00%	1,438	76.33%	1,884
Greene	1,246	89.38%	144	10.33%	4	0.29%	1,102	79.05%	1,394
Gwinnett	3,339	82.40%	713	17.60%	0	0.00%	2,626	64.81%	4,052
Habersham	1,842	78.52%	504	21.48%	0	0.00%	1,338	57.03%	2,346
Hall	3,066	79.37%	796	20.61%	1	0.03%	2,270	58.76%	3,863
Hancock	380	77.71%	109	22.29%	0	0.00%	271	55.42%	489
Haralson	1,248	57.80%	911	42.20%	0	0.00%	337	15.61%	2,159
Harris	893	91.87%	79	8.13%	0	0.00%	814	83.74%	972
Hart	1,161	86.38%	183	13.62%	0	0.00%	978	72.77%	1,344
Heard	557	75.07%	185	24.93%	0	0.00%	372	50.13%	742
Henry	1,461	90.58%	152	9.42%	0	0.00%	1,309	81.15%	1,613
Houston	535	73.79%	190	26.21%	0	0.00%	345	47.59%	725
Irwin	862	76.90%	259	23.10%	0	0.00%	603	53.79%	1,121
Jackson	1,754	88.81%	221	11.19%	0	0.00%	1,533	77.62%	1,975
Jasper	777	90.03%	86	9.97%	0	0.00%	691	80.07%	863
Jeff Davis	737	86.00%	120	14.00%	0	0.00%	617	72.00%	857
Jefferson	1,043	79.20%	274	20.80%	0	0.00%	769	58.39%	1,317
Jenkins	698	87.36%	101	12.64%	0	0.00%	597	74.72%	799
Johnson	978	76.29%	304	23.71%	0	0.00%	674	52.57%	1,282
Jones	661	76.95%	196	22.82%	2	0.23%	465	54.13%	859
Lamar	1,015	87.65%	143	12.35%	0	0.00%	872	75.30%	1,158
Lanier	625	93.98%	40	6.02%	0	0.00%	585	87.97%	665
Laurens	2,544	83.63%	498	16.37%	0	0.00%	2,046	67.26%	3,042
Lee	447	94.30%	27	5.70%	0	0.00%	420	88.61%	474
Liberty	481	79.77%	122	20.23%	0	0.00%	359	59.54%	603
Lincoln	444	72.91%	165	27.09%	0	0.00%	279	45.81%	609
Long	318	71.14%	129	28.86%	0	0.00%	189	42.28%	447
Lowndes	2,092	83.91%	401	16.09%	0	0.00%	1,691	67.83%	2,493
Lumpkin	896	80.87%	212	19.13%	0	0.00%	684	61.73%	1,108
Macon	889	84.11%	168	15.89%	0	0.00%	721	68.21%	1,057
Madison	1,235	82.22%	265	17.64%	2	0.13%	970	64.58%	1,502
Marion	501	87.74%	70	12.26%	0	0.00%	431	75.48%	571
McDuffie	795	80.96%	187	19.04%	0	0.00%	608	61.91%	982
McIntosh	406	72.76%	149	26.70%	3	0.54%	257	46.06%	558
Meriwether	2,187	92.05%	189	7.95%	0	0.00%	1,998	84.09%	2,376
Miller	809	93.20%	59	6.80%	0	0.00%	750	86.41%	868
Mitchell	2,179	90.60%	226	9.40%	0	0.00%	1,953	81.21%	2,405
Monroe	1,132	73.41%	410	26.59%	0	0.00%	722	46.82%	1,542
Montgomery	575	85.82%	94	14.03%	1	0.15%	481	71.79%	670
Morgan	1,166	95.50%	51	4.18%	4	0.33%	1,115	91.32%	1,221
Murray	1,375	67.20%	671	32.80%	0	0.00%	704	34.41%	2,046
Muscogee	6,498	82.86%	1,344	17.14%	0	0.00%	5,154	65.72%	7,842
Newton	2,022	94.27%	123	5.73%	0	0.00%	1,899	88.53%	2,145
Oconee	570	74.51%	195	25.49%	0	0.00%	375	49.02%	765
Oglethorpe	922	84.20%	173	15.80%	0	0.00%	749	68.40%	1,095
Paulding	1,355	63.53%	775	36.33%	3	0.14%	580	27.19%	2,133
Peach	919	79.57%	236	20.43%	0	0.00%	683	59.13%	1,155
Pickens	780	49.52%	795	50.48%	0	0.00%	-15	-0.95%	1,575
Pierce	1,069	86.63%	165	13.37%	0	0.00%	904	73.26%	1,234
Pike	742	84.80%	133	15.20%	0	0.00%	609	69.60%	875
Polk	2,698	85.35%	463	14.65%	0	0.00%	2,235	70.71%	3,161
Pulaski	592	91.50%	55	8.50%	0	0.00%	537	83.00%	647
Putnam	701	90.45%	74	9.55%	0	0.00%	627	80.90%	775
Quitman	355	95.69%	16	4.31%	0	0.00%	339	91.37%	371
Rabun	1,247	87.08%	185	12.92%	0	0.00%	1,062	74.16%	1,432
Randolph	1,159	91.62%	106	8.38%	0	0.00%	1,053	83.24%	1,265
Richmond	6,918	85.72%	1,152	14.28%	0	0.00%	5,766	71.45%	8,070
Rockdale	946	90.79%	96	9.21%	0	0.00%	850	81.57%	1,042
Schley	329	89.89%	37	10.11%	0	0.00%	292	79.78%	366
Screven	895	81.96%	197	18.04%	0	0.00%	698	63.92%	1,092
Seminole	1,076	92.84%	83	7.16%	0	0.00%	993	85.68%	1,159
Spalding	2,805	92.79%	217	7.18%	1	0.03%	2,588	85.61%	3,023
Stephens	1,158	84.53%	212	15.47%	0	0.00%	946	69.05%	1,370
Stewart	597	88.44%	78	11.56%	0	0.00%	519	76.89%	675
Sumter	1,550	88.88%	194	11.12%	0	0.00%	1,356	77.75%	1,744
Talbot	832	94.87%	45	5.13%	0	0.00%	787	89.74%	877
Taliaferro	389	98.48%	6	1.52%	0	0.00%	383	96.96%	395
Tattnall	1,215	71.09%	494	28.91%	0	0.00%	721	42.19%	1,709
Taylor	773	74.18%	269	25.82%	0	0.00%	504	48.37%	1,042
Telfair	1,187	87.22%	174	12.78%	0	0.00%	1,013	74.43%	1,361
Terrell	1,639	97.10%	49	2.90%	0	0.00%	1,590	94.19%	1,688
Thomas	1,747	75.79%	557	24.16%	1	0.04%	1,190	51.63%	2,305
Tift	1,630	80.45%	396	19.55%	0	0.00%	1,234	60.91%	2,026
Toombs	1,825	88.51%	237	11.49%	0	0.00%	1,588	77.01%	2,062
Towns	1,137	62.78%	674	37.22%	0	0.00%	463	25.57%	1,811
Treutlen	893	94.30%	54	5.70%	0	0.00%	839	88.60%	947
Troup	3,233	90.43%	342	9.57%	0	0.00%	2,891	80.87%	3,575
Turner	797	70.41%	334	29.51%	1	0.09%	463	40.90%	1,132
Twiggs	457	72.89%	170	27.11%	0	0.00%	287	45.77%	627
Union	1,288	62.89%	760	37.11%	0	0.00%	528	25.78%	2,048
Upson	2,362	90.67%	243	9.33%	0	0.00%	2,119	81.34%	2,605
Walker	2,753	78.23%	765	21.74%	1	0.03%	1,988	56.49%	3,519
Walton	2,046	92.25%	172	7.75%	0	0.00%	1,874	84.49%	2,218
Ware	2,306	83.34%	459	16.59%	2	0.07%	1,847	66.75%	2,767
Warren	449	74.46%	152	25.21%	2	0.33%	297	49.25%	603
Washington	1,094	75.71%	351	24.29%	0	0.00%	743	51.42%	1,445
Wayne	978	79.51%	252	20.49%	0	0.00%	726	59.02%	1,230
Webster	284	81.38%	65	18.62%	0	0.00%	219	62.75%	349
Wheeler	517	77.40%	151	22.60%	0	0.00%	366	54.79%	668
White	706	81.24%	161	18.53%	2	0.23%	545	62.72%	869
Whitfield	2,827	73.26%	1,032	26.74%	0	0.00%	1,795	46.51%	3,859
Wilcox	1,364	86.88%	206	13.12%	0	0.00%	1,158	73.76%	1,570
Wilkes	946	85.61%	159	14.39%	0	0.00%	787	71.22%	1,105
Wilkinson	763	73.79%	271	26.21%	0	0.00%	492	47.58%	1,034
Worth	1,096	83.41%	218	16.59%	0	0.00%	878	66.82%	1,314
Totals	268,187	81.73%	59,900	18.26%	42	0.01%	208,287	63.48%	328,129

==== Counties that flipped from Democratic to Republican ====
- Pickens
