= Lee County School District (Georgia) =

School district in Georgia (U.S. state)

Lee County School System
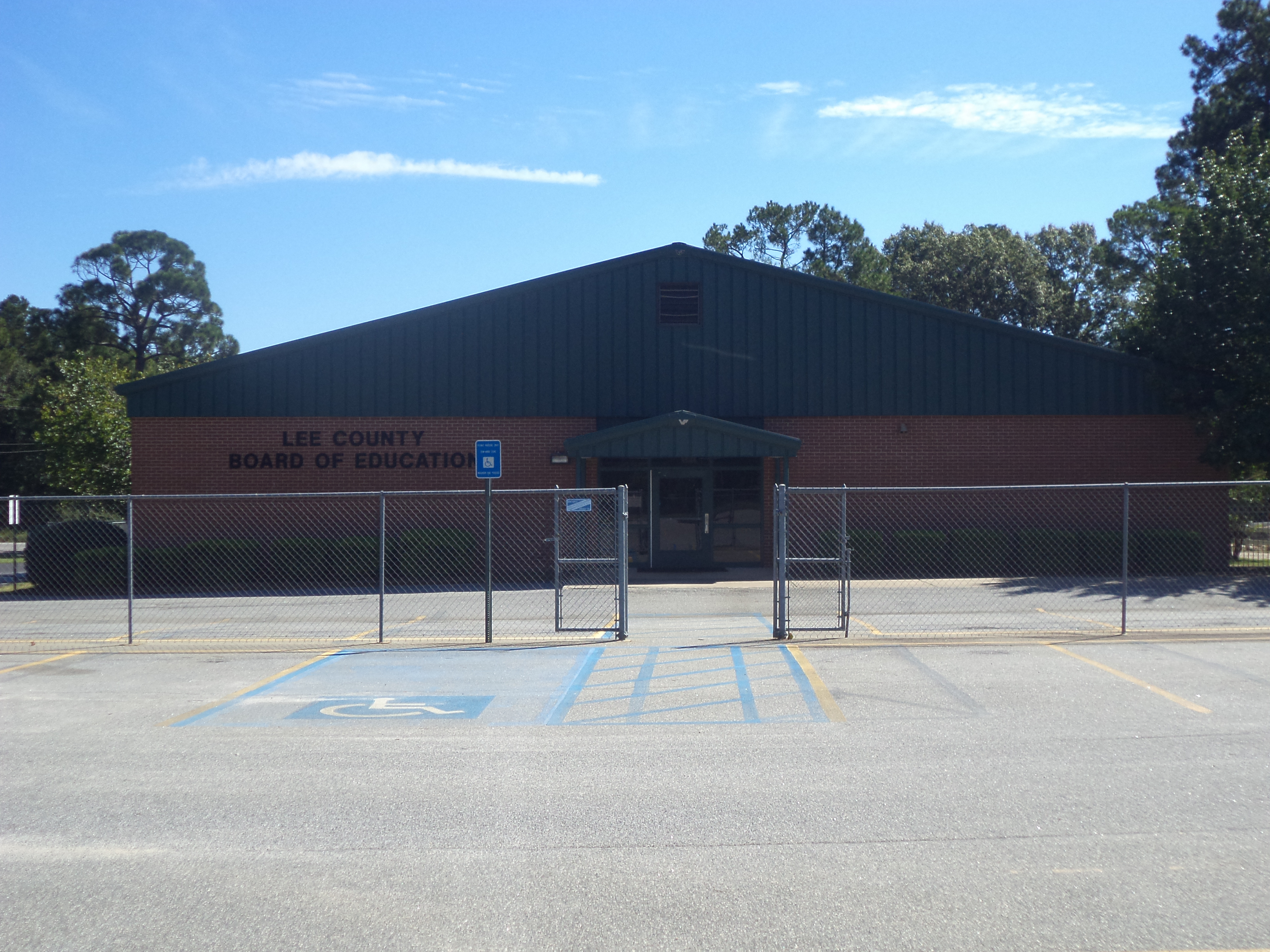

Address
- 126 Starksville Avenue North Leesburg, Georgia, 31763-4548; United States
- Coordinates: 31.732516°N 84.167903°W

District information
- Grades: Pre-school - 12
- Superintendent: Dr. Kathleen Truitt
- Accreditation(s): AdvancED; Georgia Accrediting Commission

Students and staff
- Enrollment: 6,300
- Faculty: 330

Other information
- Telephone: (229) 903-2100
- Fax: (229) 903-2130
- Website: www.lee.k12.ga.us

The Lee County School System is a public school system in Lee County, Georgia, United States, based in Leesburg. It serves the communities of Leesburg and Smithville, as well as the rest of the county.

== Schools ==
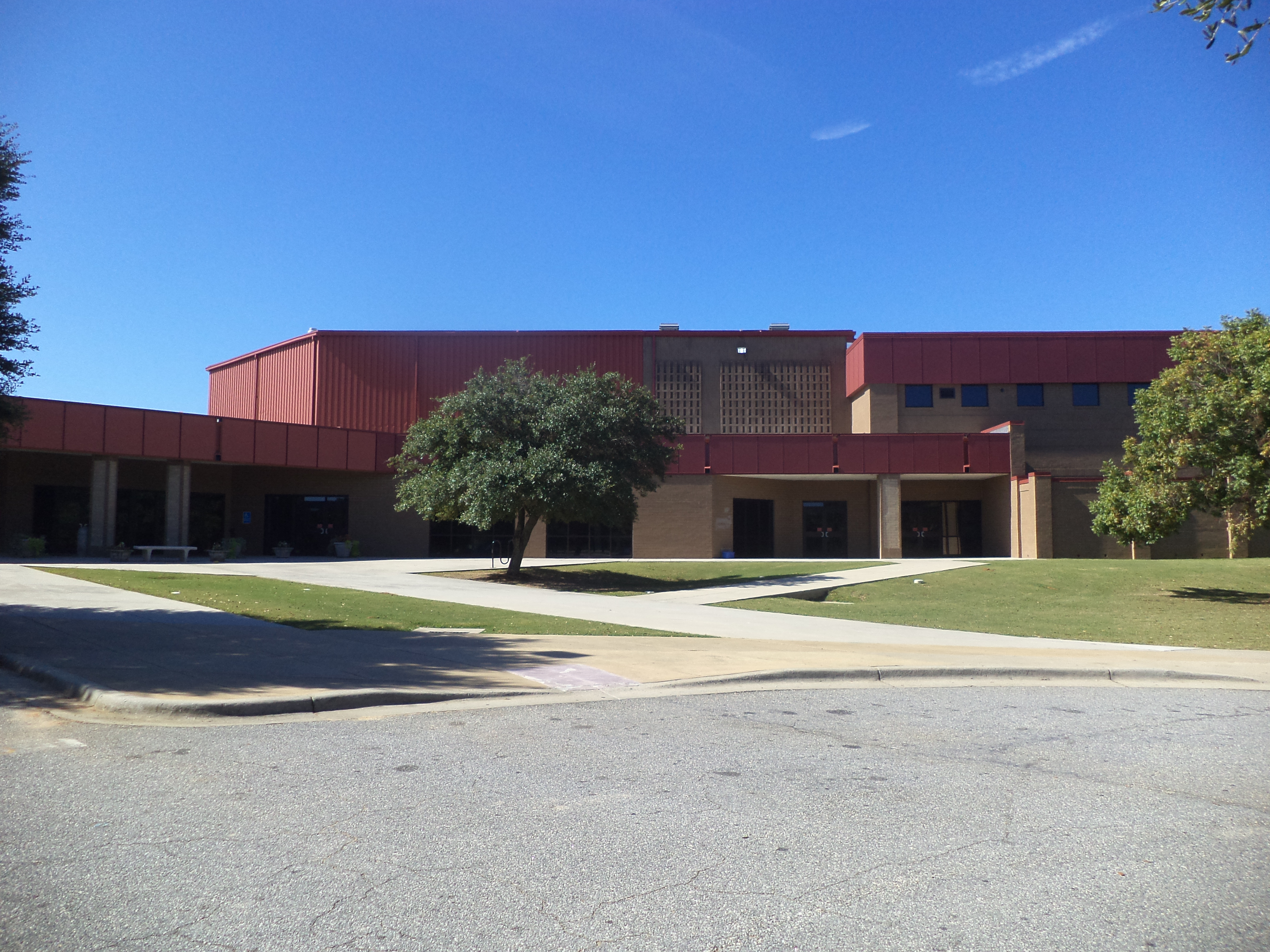
Lee County High School

The Lee County School System has two primary schools, two elementary schools, two middle schools, one 9th grade center, and one high school.

=== Elementary schools ===
- Kinchafoonee Primary School
- Lee County Elementary School
- Lee County Primary School
- Twin Oaks Elementary

=== Middle schools ===
- Lee County Middle School - East Campus
- Lee County Middle School - West Campus

=== High school ===
- Lee County High School
- Lee County High School - 9th Grade Campus
