= 1952 United States presidential election in Georgia =

- November 4, 1952

All 12 Georgia votes to the Electoral College

Nominee	Adlai Stevenson	Dwight D. Eisenhower
Party	Democratic	Republican
Home state	Illinois	New York
Running mate	John Sparkman	Richard Nixon
Electoral vote	12	0
Popular vote	456,823	198,979
Percentage	69.66%	30.34%
County results
Stevenson
50–60%
60–70%
70–80%
80–90%
90–100%
Eisenhower
50–60%
60–70%
President before election
Harry S. Truman
Democratic
Elected President
Dwight D. Eisenhower
Republican

The 1952 United States presidential election in Georgia took place on November 4, 1952, as part of the 1952 United States presidential election. Georgia voters chose 12 representatives, or electors, to the Electoral College, who voted for president and vice president.

Georgia was won by Adlai Stevenson (D–Illinois), running with Alabama Senator John Sparkman, with 69.66% of the popular vote, against Columbia University President Dwight D. Eisenhower (R–New York), running with Senator Richard Nixon, with 30.34% of the popular vote.

== Results ==
1952 United States presidential election in Georgia
Party	Candidate	Votes	%
Democratic	Adlai Stevenson	456,823	69.66%
Republican	Dwight D. Eisenhower	198,979	30.34%
Liberty Party	—	1	0.00%
Total votes		655,803	100%

=== Results by county ===
County	Adlai Stevenson Democratic		Dwight D. Eisenhower Republican		Margin		Total votes cast
County	#	%	#	%	#	%	Total votes cast
Appling	2,179	75.35%	713	24.65%	1,466	50.70%	2,892
Atkinson	1,560	88.94%	194	11.06%	1,366	77.88%	1,754
Bacon	1,512	73.58%	543	26.42%	969	47.16%	2,055
Baker	1,005	86.64%	155	13.36%	850	73.28%	1,160
Baldwin	2,318	69.38%	1,023	30.62%	1,295	38.76%	3,341
Banks	1,255	86.02%	204	13.98%	1,051	72.04%	1,459
Barrow	2,367	90.93%	236	9.07%	2,131	81.86%	2,603
Bartow	3,973	77.06%	1,183	22.94%	2,790	54.12%	5,156
Ben Hill	2,048	74.61%	697	25.39%	1,351	49.22%	2,745
Berrien	2,187	85.73%	364	14.27%	1,823	71.46%	2,551
Bibb	14,687	70.58%	6,121	29.42%	8,566	41.16%	20,808
Bleckley	1,517	89.03%	187	10.97%	1,330	78.06%	1,704
Brantley	1,082	79.68%	276	20.32%	806	59.36%	1,358
Brooks	1,866	69.99%	800	30.01%	1,066	39.98%	2,666
Bryan	971	74.58%	331	25.42%	640	49.16%	1,302
Bulloch	3,619	79.92%	909	20.08%	2,710	59.84%	4,528
Burke	1,160	55.45%	932	44.55%	228	10.90%	2,092
Butts	1,910	91.00%	189	9.00%	1,721	82.00%	2,099
Calhoun	810	84.64%	147	15.36%	663	69.28%	957
Camden	1,285	67.49%	619	32.51%	666	34.98%	1,904
Candler	1,448	77.43%	422	22.57%	1,026	54.86%	1,870
Carroll	5,207	81.35%	1,194	18.65%	4,013	62.70%	6,401
Catoosa	2,227	61.90%	1,371	38.10%	856	23.80%	3,598
Charlton	815	73.89%	288	26.11%	527	47.78%	1,103
Chatham	14,370	48.06%	15,532	51.94%	-1,162	-3.88%	29,902
Chattahoochee	116	61.38%	73	38.62%	43	22.76%	189
Chattooga	3,616	82.43%	771	17.57%	2,845	64.86%	4,387
Cherokee	2,452	60.25%	1,618	39.75%	834	20.50%	4,070
Clarke	4,904	75.54%	1,588	24.46%	3,316	51.08%	6,492
Clay	481	73.21%	176	26.79%	305	46.42%	657
Clayton	4,058	76.74%	1,230	23.26%	2,828	53.48%	5,288
Clinch	1,168	76.94%	350	23.06%	818	53.88%	1,518
Cobb	10,182	70.98%	4,163	29.02%	6,019	41.96%	14,345
Coffee	3,292	75.33%	1,078	24.67%	2,214	50.66%	4,370
Colquitt	4,517	76.20%	1,411	23.80%	3,106	52.40%	5,928
Columbia	849	61.57%	530	38.43%	319	23.14%	1,379
Cook	2,347	85.59%	395	14.41%	1,952	71.18%	2,742
Coweta	3,837	85.48%	652	14.52%	3,185	70.96%	4,489
Crawford	948	86.73%	145	13.27%	803	73.46%	1,093
Crisp	2,116	69.04%	949	30.96%	1,167	38.08%	3,065
Dade	1,296	65.39%	686	34.61%	610	30.78%	1,982
Dawson	770	62.10%	470	37.90%	300	24.20%	1,240
Decatur	2,581	72.05%	1,001	27.95%	1,580	44.10%	3,582
DeKalb	20,865	57.24%	15,588	42.76%	5,277	14.48%	36,453
Dodge	3,445	88.36%	454	11.64%	2,991	76.72%	3,899
Dooly	1,764	89.95%	197	10.05%	1,567	79.90%	1,961
Dougherty	4,435	63.63%	2,535	36.37%	1,900	27.26%	6,970
Douglas	2,102	76.52%	645	23.48%	1,457	53.04%	2,747
Early	1,803	85.45%	307	14.55%	1,496	70.90%	2,110
Echols	532	84.98%	94	15.02%	438	69.96%	626
Effingham	800	49.11%	829	50.89%	-29	-1.78%	1,629
Elbert	3,279	85.59%	552	14.41%	2,727	71.18%	3,831
Emanuel	2,642	79.99%	661	20.01%	1,981	59.98%	3,303
Evans	1,224	73.87%	433	26.13%	791	47.74%	1,657
Fannin	1,913	39.71%	2,904	60.29%	-991	-20.58%	4,817
Fayette	1,214	86.16%	195	13.84%	1,019	72.32%	1,409
Floyd	8,477	65.16%	4,532	34.84%	3,945	30.32%	13,009
Forsyth	1,391	72.18%	536	27.82%	855	44.36%	1,927
Franklin	2,902	88.61%	373	11.39%	2,529	77.22%	3,275
Fulton	52,459	59.85%	35,197	40.15%	17,262	19.70%	87,656
Gilmer	1,359	50.65%	1,324	49.35%	35	1.30%	2,683
Glascock	381	62.05%	233	37.95%	148	24.10%	614
Glynn	3,348	56.53%	2,575	43.47%	773	13.06%	5,923
Gordon	2,203	71.46%	880	28.54%	1,323	42.92%	3,083
Grady	2,782	81.23%	643	18.77%	2,139	62.46%	3,425
Greene	2,323	85.40%	397	14.60%	1,926	70.80%	2,720
Gwinnett	6,026	85.58%	1,015	14.42%	5,011	71.16%	7,041
Habersham	2,647	74.19%	921	25.81%	1,726	48.38%	3,568
Hall	6,121	76.84%	1,845	23.16%	4,276	53.68%	7,966
Hancock	1,245	82.34%	267	17.66%	978	64.68%	1,512
Haralson	2,283	64.36%	1,264	35.64%	1,019	28.72%	3,547
Harris	1,374	71.64%	544	28.36%	830	43.28%	1,918
Hart	3,244	94.08%	204	5.92%	3,040	88.16%	3,448
Heard	1,189	86.60%	184	13.40%	1,005	73.20%	1,373
Henry	2,589	82.40%	553	17.60%	2,036	64.80%	3,142
Houston	2,789	84.52%	511	15.48%	2,278	69.04%	3,300
Irwin	1,475	74.08%	516	25.92%	959	48.16%	1,991
Jackson	3,341	89.09%	409	10.91%	2,932	78.18%	3,750
Jasper	1,105	82.90%	228	17.10%	877	65.80%	1,333
Jeff Davis	1,323	78.28%	367	21.72%	956	56.56%	1,690
Jefferson	1,476	66.49%	744	33.51%	732	32.98%	2,220
Jenkins	1,166	76.01%	368	23.99%	798	52.02%	1,534
Johnson	1,808	84.01%	344	15.99%	1,464	68.02%	2,152
Jones	1,427	83.70%	278	16.30%	1,149	67.40%	1,705
Lamar	1,552	78.34%	429	21.66%	1,123	56.68%	1,981
Lanier	845	83.25%	170	16.75%	675	66.50%	1,015
Laurens	5,001	82.70%	1,046	17.30%	3,955	65.40%	6,047
Lee	390	65.55%	205	34.45%	185	31.10%	595
Liberty	1,448	73.69%	517	26.31%	931	47.38%	1,965
Lincoln	644	66.32%	327	33.68%	317	32.64%	971
Long	691	62.20%	420	37.80%	271	24.40%	1,111
Lowndes	3,245	60.95%	2,079	39.05%	1,166	21.90%	5,324
Lumpkin	997	72.93%	370	27.07%	627	45.86%	1,367
McDuffie	1,172	55.68%	933	44.32%	239	11.36%	2,105
McIntosh	724	59.01%	503	40.99%	221	18.02%	1,227
Macon	1,472	82.19%	319	17.81%	1,153	64.38%	1,791
Madison	1,899	89.41%	225	10.59%	1,674	78.82%	2,124
Marion	651	78.15%	182	21.85%	469	56.30%	833
Meriwether	3,551	86.99%	531	13.01%	3,020	73.98%	4,082
Miller	1,617	87.88%	223	12.12%	1,394	75.76%	1,840
Mitchell	3,054	83.56%	601	16.44%	2,453	67.12%	3,655
Monroe	2,406	82.77%	501	17.23%	1,905	65.54%	2,907
Montgomery	1,758	85.84%	290	14.16%	1,468	71.68%	2,048
Morgan	1,649	86.97%	247	13.03%	1,402	73.94%	1,896
Murray	1,840	70.88%	756	29.12%	1,084	41.76%	2,596
Muscogee	11,220	58.95%	7,814	41.05%	3,406	17.90%	19,034
Newton	3,529	89.12%	431	10.88%	3,098	78.24%	3,960
Oconee	1,182	77.81%	337	22.19%	845	55.62%	1,519
Oglethorpe	1,461	87.54%	208	12.46%	1,253	75.08%	1,669
Paulding	2,152	73.20%	788	26.80%	1,364	46.40%	2,940
Peach	1,523	80.24%	374	19.70%	1,149	60.54%	1,898 (Note: One write-in vote was cast in this county for an unlisted candidate.)
Pickens	1,312	49.70%	1,328	50.30%	-16	-0.60%	2,640
Pierce	1,903	76.27%	592	23.73%	1,311	52.54%	2,495
Pike	1,248	81.36%	286	18.64%	962	62.72%	1,534
Polk	4,447	77.39%	1,299	22.61%	3,148	54.78%	5,746
Pulaski	1,572	90.50%	165	9.50%	1,407	81.00%	1,737
Putnam	1,251	83.34%	250	16.66%	1,001	66.68%	1,501
Quitman	332	78.12%	93	21.88%	239	56.24%	425
Rabun	1,320	74.62%	449	25.38%	871	49.24%	1,769
Randolph	1,419	73.68%	507	26.32%	912	47.36%	1,926
Richmond	8,584	47.87%	9,347	52.13%	-763	-4.26%	17,931
Rockdale	1,665	83.84%	321	16.16%	1,344	67.68%	1,986
Schley	436	74.66%	148	25.34%	288	49.32%	584
Screven	1,584	69.60%	692	30.40%	892	39.20%	2,276
Seminole	1,126	86.48%	176	13.52%	950	72.96%	1,302
Spalding	5,296	80.92%	1,249	19.08%	4,047	61.84%	6,545
Stephens	3,539	84.26%	661	15.74%	2,878	68.52%	4,200
Stewart	816	72.40%	311	27.60%	505	44.80%	1,127
Sumter	2,455	69.68%	1,068	30.32%	1,387	39.36%	3,523
Talbot	678	79.48%	175	20.52%	503	58.96%	853
Taliaferro	873	89.45%	103	10.55%	770	78.90%	976
Tattnall	2,433	68.59%	1,114	31.41%	1,319	37.18%	3,547
Taylor	1,679	85.84%	277	14.16%	1,402	71.68%	1,956
Telfair	2,695	91.73%	243	8.27%	2,452	83.46%	2,938
Terrell	1,375	78.84%	369	21.16%	1,006	57.68%	1,744
Thomas	3,971	63.60%	2,273	36.40%	1,698	27.20%	6,244
Tift	2,954	69.15%	1,318	30.85%	1,636	38.30%	4,272
Toombs	2,641	78.51%	723	21.49%	1,918	57.02%	3,364
Towns	1,111	53.06%	983	46.94%	128	6.12%	2,094
Treutlen	1,416	93.34%	101	6.66%	1,315	86.68%	1,517
Troup	7,130	79.07%	1,887	20.93%	5,243	58.14%	9,017
Turner	1,357	77.15%	402	22.85%	955	54.30%	1,759
Twiggs	1,080	84.97%	191	15.03%	889	69.94%	1,271
Union	1,360	50.56%	1,330	49.44%	30	1.12%	2,690
Upson	3,837	85.55%	648	14.45%	3,189	71.10%	4,485
Walker	4,366	60.37%	2,866	39.63%	1,500	20.74%	7,232
Walton	3,672	91.89%	324	8.11%	3,348	83.78%	3,996
Ware	5,627	69.94%	2,418	30.06%	3,209	39.88%	8,045
Warren	693	64.95%	374	35.05%	319	29.90%	1,067
Washington	2,381	74.97%	795	25.03%	1,586	49.94%	3,176
Wayne	1,929	69.87%	832	30.13%	1,097	39.74%	2,761
Webster	335	70.82%	138	29.18%	197	41.64%	473
Wheeler	1,280	83.06%	261	16.94%	1,019	66.12%	1,541
White	1,139	80.15%	282	19.85%	857	60.30%	1,421
Whitfield	4,661	62.51%	2,795	37.49%	1,866	25.02%	7,456
Wilcox	1,878	86.19%	301	13.81%	1,577	72.38%	2,179
Wilkes	1,500	83.99%	286	16.01%	1,214	67.98%	1,786
Wilkinson	1,629	81.17%	378	18.83%	1,251	62.34%	2,007
Worth	1,986	81.73%	444	18.27%	1,542	63.46%	2,430
Totals	456,823	69.66%	198,979	30.34%	257,844	39.32%	655,803

==== Counties that flipped from Democratic to Republican ====
- Chatham

==== Counties that flipped from Republican to Democratic ====
- Dawson

==== Counties that flipped from Dixiecrat to Democratic ====
- Burke
- Chattahoochee
- Columbia
- Glascock
- Jefferson
- Lee
- Lincoln
- McDuffie
- Twiggs
- Warren

==== Counties that flipped from Dixiecrat to Republican ====
- Effingham
- Richmond

== See also ==
- United States presidential elections in Georgia
