= Leesburg, Georgia =

- City
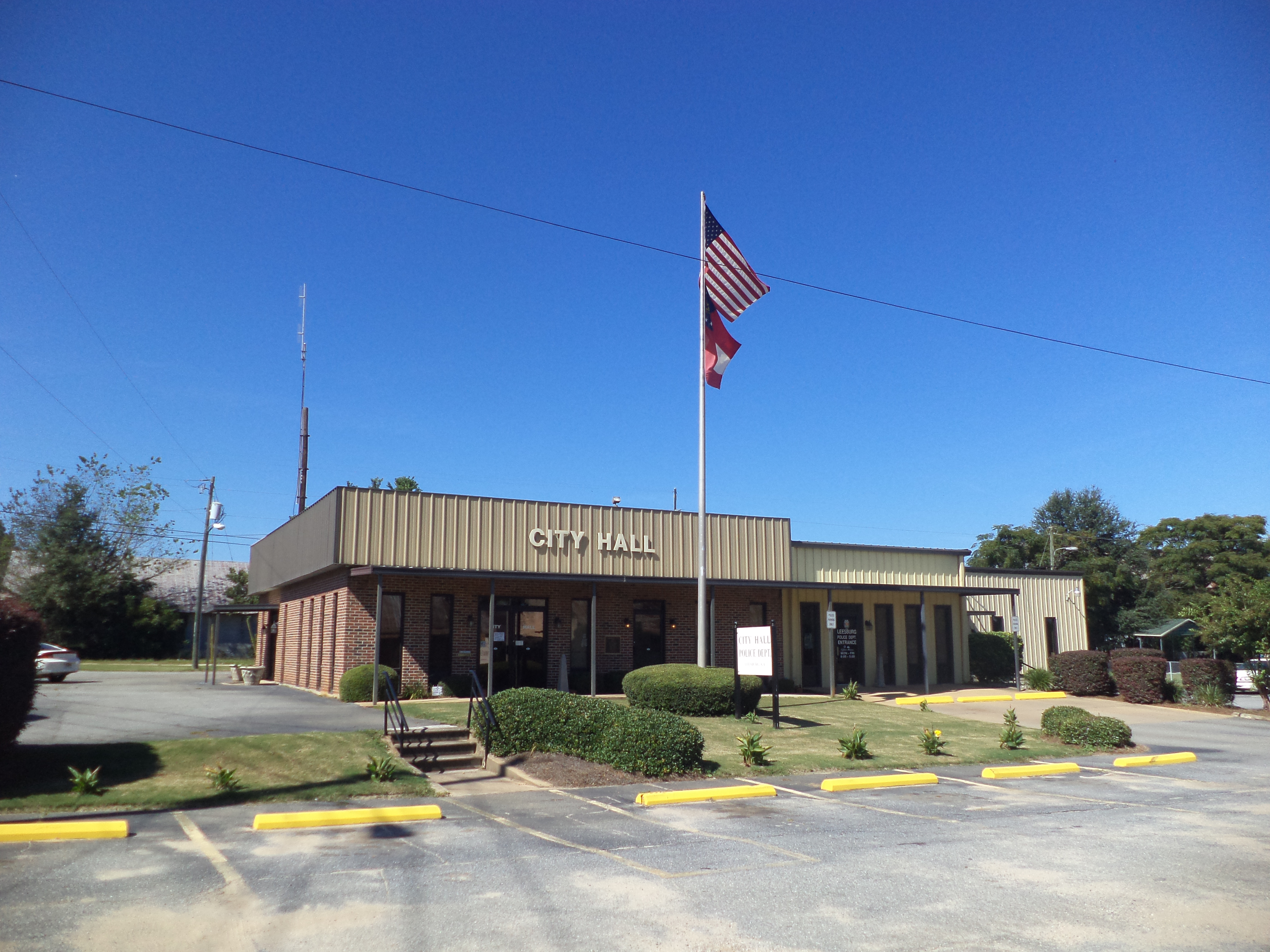
- Leesburg City Hall

- Location in Lee County and the state of Georgia
- Coordinates: 31°43′58″N 84°10′15″W
- Country: United States
- State: Georgia
- County: Lee

Area
  - Total: 4.97 sq mi (12.86 km^{2})
  - Land: 4.91 sq mi (12.72 km^{2})
  - Water: 0.054 sq mi (0.14 km^{2})
- Elevation: 259 ft (79 m)

Population (2020)
  - Total: 3,480
  - Density: 708.4/sq mi (273.52/km^{2})
- Time zone: UTC-5 (Eastern (EST))
  - Summer (DST): UTC-4 (EDT)
- ZIP code: 31763
- Area code: 229
- FIPS code: 13-45768
- GNIS feature ID: 0356352
- Website: cityofleesburgga.com

Leesburg is a city in and the county seat of Lee County, Georgia, United States. The population was 3,480 at the 2020 census, up from 2,896 at the 2010 census. It is part of the Albany, Georgia metropolitan area.

== History ==
Leesburg, originally known as "Wooten Station", was founded in 1870 as the Central of Georgia Railway arrived in the area. In 1872, the town was renamed "Wooten", and the seat was transferred from Starksville. In 1874, the town was incorporated and renamed again to its present form of Leesburg.

Leesburg is the site of the Leesburg Stockade incident, in which a group of African-American teenage and pre-teen girls were arrested for protesting racial segregation in Americus, Georgia, and were imprisoned without charges for 60 days in poor conditions in the Lee County Public Works building.

== Geography ==
Leesburg is in south-central Lee County. U.S. Route 19 passes through the city, leading north 26 miles (42 km) to Americus and south 11 miles (18 km) to Albany. State Route 32 is Leesburg's Main Street; it leads east 32 miles (51 km) to Ashburn and west 18 miles (29 km) to Dawson. State Route 195 leads northeast from Leesburg 17 miles (27 km) to Leslie.

According to the United States Census Bureau, Leesburg has a total area of 5.0 square miles (12.9 km^{2}), of which 0.05 square miles (0.14 km^{2}), or 1.06%, are water. Kinchafoonee Creek flows through a western corner of the city; it leads south to the Flint River, part of the Apalachicola River watershed.

== Demographics ==
Historical population
Census	Pop.	Note	%±
1880	358		—
1890	442		23.5%
1900	413		−6.6%
1910	705		70.7%
1920	786		11.5%
1930	691		−12.1%
1940	716		3.6%
1950	659		−8.0%
1960	774		17.5%
1970	996		28.7%
1980	1,301		30.6%
1990	1,452		11.6%
2000	2,633		81.3%
2010	2,896		10.0%
2020	3,480		20.2%
U.S. Decennial Census; 1850-1870 1870-1880; 1890-1910 1920-1930; 1940 1950 1960; 1970 1980 1990; 2000 2010

=== Racial and ethnic composition ===
Leesburg city, Georgia – Racial and ethnic composition Note: the US Census treats Hispanic/Latino as an ethnic category. This table excludes Latinos from the racial categories and assigns them to a separate category. Hispanics/Latinos may be of any race.
Race / Ethnicity (NH = Non-Hispanic)	Pop 2000	Pop 2010	Pop 2020	% 2000	% 2010	% 2020
White alone (NH)	1,607	2,010	2,121	61.03%	69.41%	60.95%
Black or African American alone (NH)	955	733	1,092	36.27%	25.31%	31.38%
Native American or Alaska Native alone (NH)	8	7	3	0.30%	0.24%	0.09%
Asian alone (NH)	24	30	30	0.91%	1.04%	0.86%
Native Hawaiian or Pacific Islander alone (NH)	0	0	1	0.00%	0.00%	0.03%
Other race alone (NH)	0	4	13	0.00%	0.14%	0.37%
Mixed race or Multiracial (NH)	17	39	135	0.65%	1.35%	3.88%
Hispanic or Latino (any race)	22	73	85	0.84%	2.52%	2.44%
Total	2,633	2,896	3,480	100.00%	100.00%	100.00%

=== 2020 census ===
As of the 2020 census, there were 3,480 people, 884 households, and 666 families residing in the city.

The median age was 33.7 years. 31.0% of residents were under the age of 18 and 12.5% of residents were 65 years of age or older. For every 100 females there were 87.0 males, and for every 100 females age 18 and over there were 78.6 males age 18 and over.

0.0% of residents lived in urban areas, while 100.0% lived in rural areas.

Of the city's households, 48.8% had children under the age of 18 living in them. 43.4% were married-couple households, 14.2% were households with a male householder and no spouse or partner present, and 37.0% were households with a female householder and no spouse or partner present. About 24.0% of all households were made up of individuals, and 11.0% had someone living alone who was 65 years of age or older.

There were 1,249 housing units, of which 884 were occupied and 365 were vacant.

Leesburg racial composition as of 2020
Race	Num.	Perc.
White (non-Hispanic)	2,121	60.95%
Black or African American (non-Hispanic)	1,092	31.38%
Native American	3	0.09%
Asian	30	0.86%
Pacific Islander	1	0.03%
Other/Mixed	148	4.25%

== Education ==
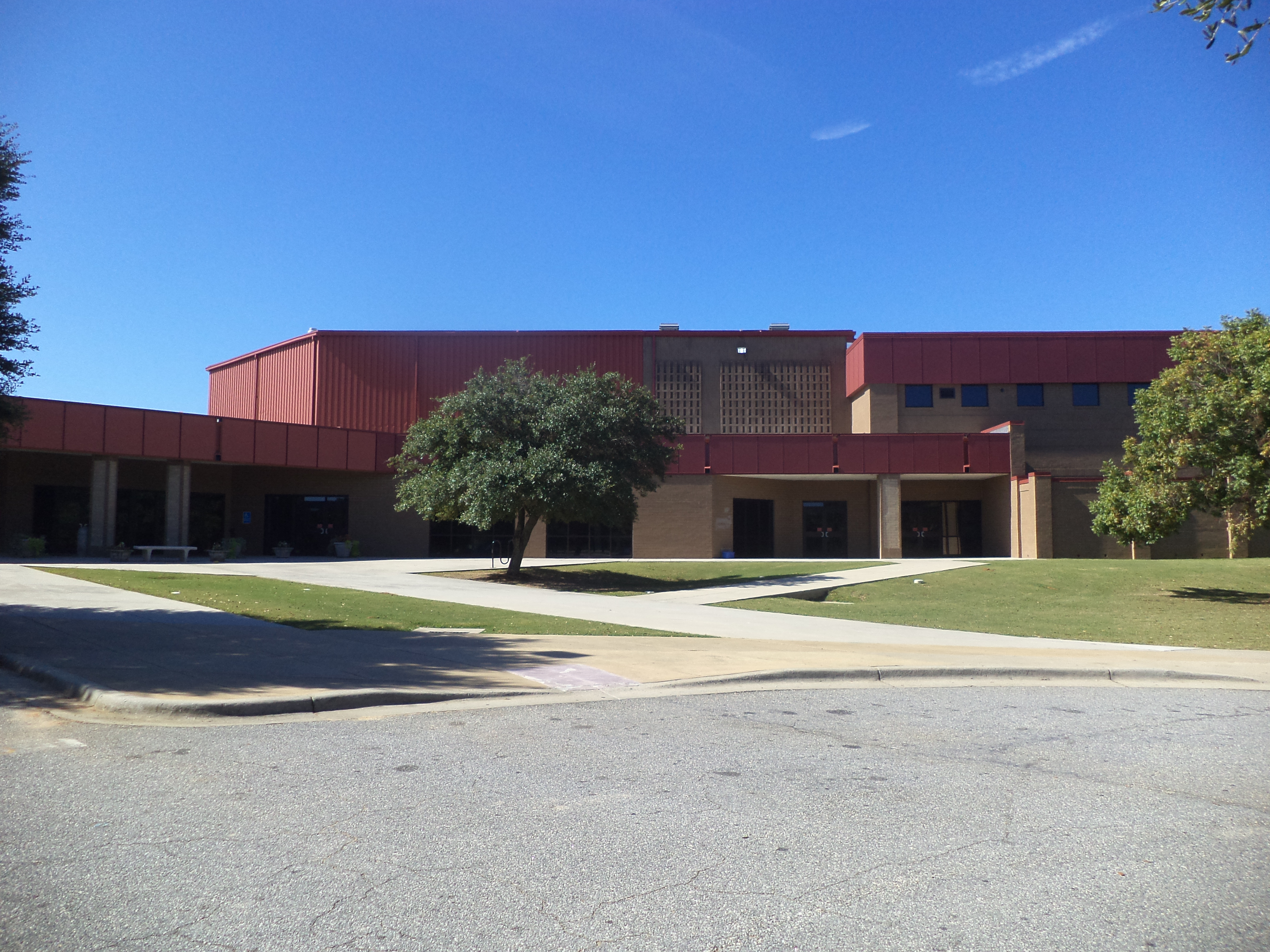
Lee County High School

The Lee County School District holds pre-school to grade twelve, and consists of two primary schools, two elementary schools, two middle schools, and a high school. The district has 330 full-time teachers and over 5,350 students.

- Kinchafoonee Primary School
- Lee County Elementary School
- Lee County Primary School
- Twin Oaks Elementary
- Lee County Middle School East Campus
- Lee County Middle School West Campus
- Lee County High School
- Lee County High School 9th Grade Campus

== Notable people ==
- Hal Breeden, former Major League Baseball player, former sheriff of Lee County
- Luke Bryan, country music artist
- Tic Forrester, congressman
- Roy Hamilton, singer of R&B, soul, show tunes and rock 'n' roll music
- Carly Mathis, Miss Georgia 2013
- Marion Motley, Pro Football Hall of Fame running back
- Phillip Phillips, American Idol season 11 winner
- Buster Posey, San Francisco Giants President of Baseball Operations
- Merritt Ranew, former Major League Baseball player
