= De Soto, Georgia =

- City
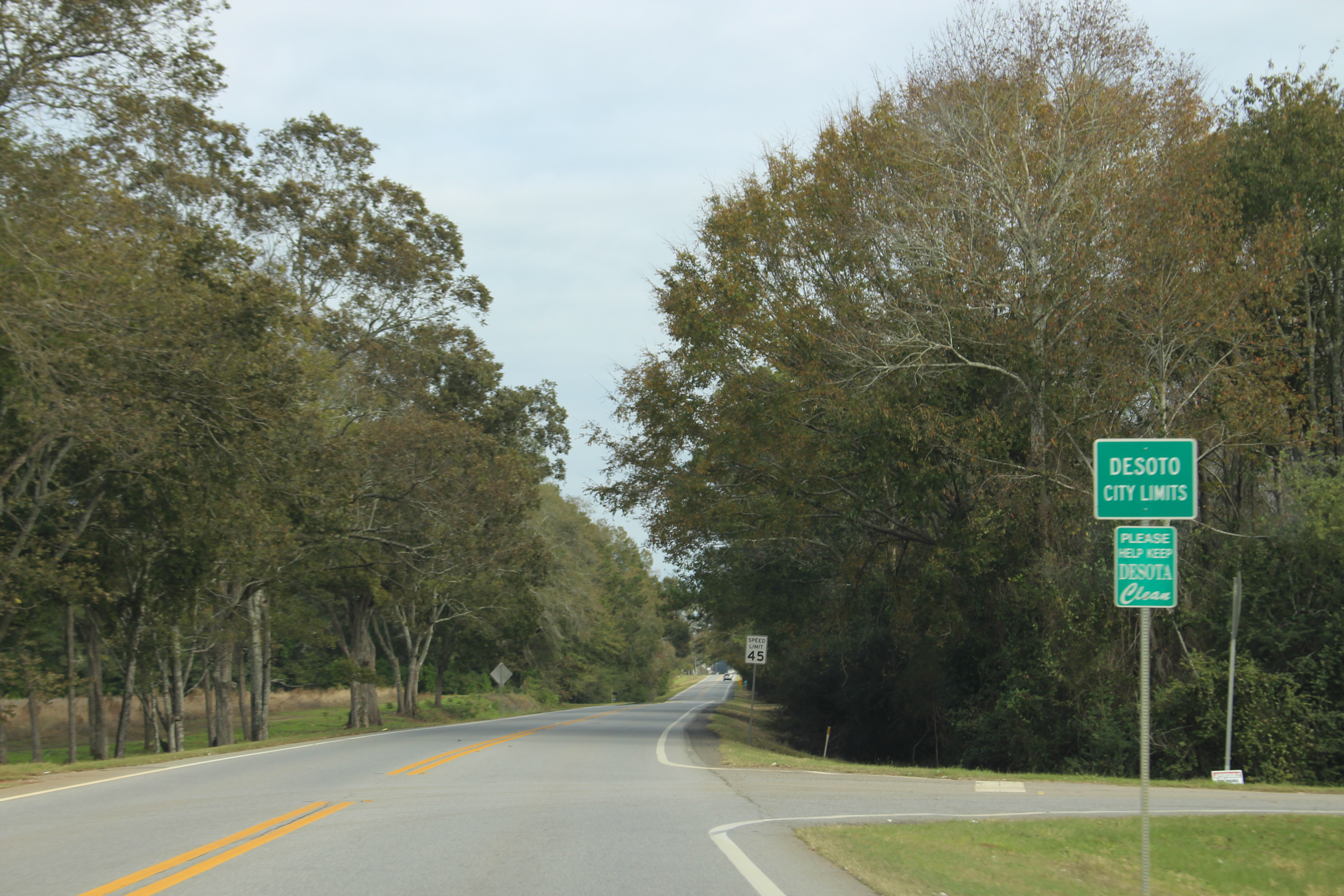
- De Soto city limit along SR 30/SR 195/US 280

- Location in Sumter County and the state of Georgia
- Coordinates: 31°57′17″N 84°4′3″W
- Country: United States
- State: Georgia
- County: Sumter

Government
  - Type: Mayor-council government
  - Mayor: James Cutts
  - De Soto City Council: Members: Duane Crawford; Doretha Dowdell; Otis Franklin; Jake Reese

Area
  - Total: 0.81 sq mi (2.11 km^{2})
  - Land: 0.81 sq mi (2.11 km^{2})
  - Water: 0 sq mi (0.00 km^{2})
- Elevation: 308 ft (94 m)

Population (2020)
  - Total: 124
  - Density: 152.1/sq mi (58.71/km^{2})
- Time zone: UTC-5 (Eastern (EST))
  - Summer (DST): UTC-4 (EDT)
- ZIP code: 31743
- Area code: 229
- FIPS code: 13-22472
- GNIS feature ID: 0355464

De Soto is a city in Sumter County, Georgia, United States. As of the 2020 census, De Soto had a population of 124. It is part of the Americus micropolitan statistical area.

== History ==
The Georgia General Assembly incorporated the place in 1889 as the "Town of De Soto". The community is named for Hernando de Soto, the explorer who discovered the Mississippi River.

== Geography ==
De Soto is located at 31°57′17″N 84°4′3″W (31.954674, -84.067633).

According to the United States Census Bureau, the city has a total area of 0.8 square miles (2.1 km^{2}), all land.

== Demographics ==
Historical population
Census	Pop.	Note	%±
1900	250		—
1910	228		−8.8%
1920	216		−5.3%
1930	373		72.7%
1940	295		−20.9%
1950	309		4.7%
1960	282		−8.7%
1970	321		13.8%
1980	248		−22.7%
1990	258		4.0%
2000	214		−17.1%
2010	195		−8.9%
2020	124		−36.4%
U.S. Decennial Census; 1850-1870 1870-1880; 1890-1910 1920-1930; 1940 1950 1960; 1970 1980 1990; 2000 2010 2020

=== Racial and ethnic composition ===
De Soto city, Georgia – Racial and ethnic composition Note: the US Census treats Hispanic/Latino as an ethnic category. This table excludes Latinos from the racial categories and assigns them to a separate category. Hispanics/Latinos may be of any race.
Race / Ethnicity (NH = Non-Hispanic)	Pop 2000	Pop 2010	Pop 2020	% 2000	% 2010	% 2020
White alone (NH)	68	54	30	31.78%	27.69%	24.19%
Black or African American alone (NH)	140	130	85	65.42%	66.67%	68.55%
Native American or Alaska Native alone (NH)	2	0	0	0.93%	0.00%	0.00%
Asian alone (NH)	0	4	0	0.00%	2.05%	0.00%
Native Hawaiian or Pacific Islander alone (NH)	0	0	0	0.00%	0.00%	0.00%
Other race alone (NH)	0	0	0	0.00%	0.00%	0.00%
Mixed race or Multiracial (NH)	0	0	0	0.00%	0.00%	0.00%
Hispanic or Latino (any race)	4	7	9	1.87%	3.59%	7.26%
Total	214	195	124	100.00%	100.00%	100.00%

=== 2000 census ===
As of the census of 2000, there were 214 people, 78 households, and 53 families residing in the city. By 2020, its population was 124.

== Politics ==
In 2010, the city was cited by the Georgia Secretary of State's office for failing to hold regular elections in 2009, as well as being unable to document any elections from 2005 through 2007. A De Soto councilmember apologized by saying that the city simply "forgot" about the need to hold an election. Facing a number of state violations, the city promised to remedy the situation permanently by outsourcing the elections process to a third party. The state provided that the 2009 election must be held by March 2010.

== Notable people ==
- Mabel Sessions Dennis, socialite and newspaper editor
