= Flintside, Georgia =

Unincorporated community in Georgia, U.S.

Coordinates: 31°57′18″N 83°57′16″W

Flintside is an unincorporated community in Sumter County, in the U.S. state of Georgia.

== History ==
A post office called Flintside was established in 1924, and remained in operation until 1935. The community was named from its location on the Flint River. A variant name was "Huguenin".
