= Muckalee Creek =

Creek in southwest Georgia, United States

Coordinates: 32°18′N 84°31′W

Muckalee Creek (pronounced MUHK-uh-lee) is a creek in southwest Georgia (U.S. state). It originates southeast of Buena Vista and flows south-southeast for 76.3 miles (122.8 km) and into Kinchafoonee Creek north of Albany, just upstream of that creek's confluence with the Flint River.

Muckalee is a name derived from the Creek language. It is also the subject of a country song by Luke Bryan titled "Muckalee Creek Water" and is mentioned in Bryan's song, "Huntin', Fishin' and Lovin' Every Day".
