= Kinchafoonee Creek =

Creek in southwest Georgia, US

Coordinates: 31.606°N 84.1356°W

Kinchafoonee Creek (/kɪntʃəˈfuːniː/ kinch-ə-FOO-nee) is a creek in southwest Georgia. It originates near Buena Vista and flows southeasterly for 91.8 miles (147.7 km) to the Flint River near Albany, Georgia.

Its name comes from the Creek word for "mortar nutshells", which refers to a type of nutcracker.

The creek flows through Chattahoochee, Marion, Dougherty, Lee, Terrell, and Webster (formerly Kinchafoonee) counties.
