= Leslie, Georgia =

- City
- Location in Sumter County and the state of Georgia
- Coordinates: 31°57′18″N 84°5′13″W
- Country: United States
- State: Georgia
- County: Sumter

Area
  - Total: 1.77 sq mi (4.59 km^{2})
  - Land: 1.77 sq mi (4.59 km^{2})
  - Water: 0.0039 sq mi (0.01 km^{2})
- Elevation: 338 ft (103 m)

Population (2020)
  - Total: 344
  - Density: 194.3/sq mi (75.03/km^{2})
- Time zone: UTC-5 (Eastern (EST))
  - Summer (DST): UTC-4 (EDT)
- ZIP code: 31764
- Area code: 229
- FIPS code: 13-46020
- GNIS feature ID: 0316768
- Website: https://www.lesliega.us/

Leslie is a city in Sumter County, Georgia, United States. As of the 2020 census, Leslie had a population of 344. It is part of the Americus micropolitan area.

== History ==
Leslie was founded in 1884. The community was named after one Leslie Bailey. The Georgia General Assembly incorporated Leslie in 1892.

== Geography ==
Leslie is located at 31°57′18″N 84°5′13″W (31.954900, -84.086904).

According to the United States Census Bureau, the city has a total area of 1.8 square miles (4.7 km^{2}), all land.

== Demographics ==
Historical population
Census	Pop.	Note	%±
1900	213		—
1910	393		84.5%
1920	470		19.6%
1930	620		31.9%
1940	479		−22.7%
1950	417		−12.9%
1960	494		18.5%
1970	562		13.8%
1980	470		−16.4%
1990	445		−5.3%
2000	455		2.2%
2010	409		−10.1%
2020	344		−15.9%
U.S. Decennial Census

As of the census of 2000, there were 455 people, 175 households, and 127 families residing in the city. The population density was 256.6 inhabitants per square mile (99.1/km^{2}). There were 192 housing units at an average density of 108.3 per square mile (41.8/km^{2}). The racial makeup of the city was 50.99% White, 45.05% African American, 3.74% from other races, and 0.22% from two or more races. Hispanic or Latino people of any race were 4.40% of the population.

There were 175 households, out of which 28.0% had children under the age of 18 living with them, 49.1% were married couples living together, 18.9% had a female householder with no husband present, and 26.9% were non-families. 25.7% of all households were made up of individuals, and 11.4% had someone living alone who was 65 years of age or older. The average household size was 2.60 and the average family size was 3.11.

In the city, the population was spread out, with 23.5% under the age of 18, 9.2% from 18 to 24, 23.1% from 25 to 44, 24.6% from 45 to 64, and 19.6% who were 65 years of age or older. The median age was 42 years. For every 100 females, there were 76.4 males. For every 100 females age 18 and over, there were 85.1 males.

The median income for a household in the city was $24,773, and the median income for a family was $29,821. Males had a median income of $30,625 versus $21,607 for females. The per capita income for the city was $15,243. About 21.1% of families and 28.2% of the population were below the poverty line, including 44.9% of those under age 18 and 16.9% of those age 65 or over.

== Attractions ==
Leslie is the site of the Georgia Rural Telephone Museum, a large collection of antique telephone equipment.
