= List of residences of American musicians =

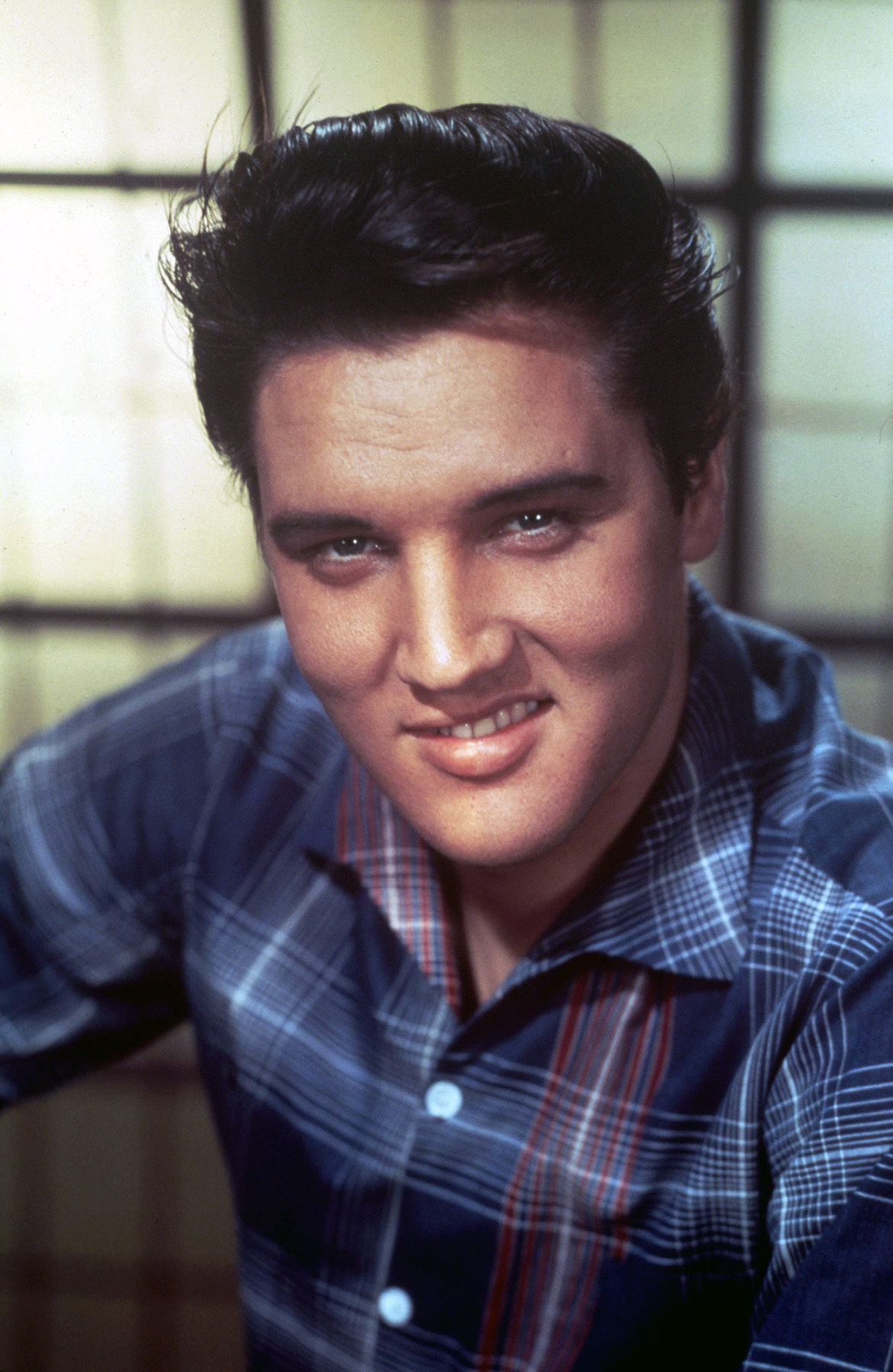
Singer Elvis Presley's mansion Graceland in Memphis, Tennessee is a National Historic Landmark.

In the United States, the homes of many musicians have been preserved or otherwise promoted as a memorial to the musician who used to live there. These sites have become local landmarks, with some being open to the public for visitation. Listed below are private residences in the United States of significant American musicians. Some include studios where they recorded music.

This list concerns sites that are listed on the National Historic Register, preserved for their historic merit, open to the public as a museum, or otherwise notable.

== Legend ==
* Listed on the National Register of Historic Places
† Designated a National Historic Landmark (Note: National Historic Landmarks are automatically registered to the National Register of Historic Places.)

== Alabama ==
Musician	Image	Residence	Years	Coordinates	Notes
Hank Williams		Hank Williams Boyhood Home & Museum	1931-1934	Georgiana; 31.639568°N 86.7429213°W	Williams' boyhood home, where he received his first guitar. The only surviving childhood residence where he lived before rising to fame in Nashville.

== Arkansas ==
Musician	Image	Residence	Years	Coordinates	Notes
Johnny Cash		Johnny Cash Boyhood Home*	1935-1950	Dyess; 35.597393°N 90.244989°W	Cash's boyhood home; his experiences growing up picking cotton and working on the farm influenced some of his future songs.

== Connecticut ==
Musician	Image	Residence	Years	Coordinates	Notes
Leroy Anderson		Leroy Anderson House*	1953-1975	Woodbury; 41.539444°N 73.235556°W	Anderson moved to this house in 1953; his wife grew up in Woodbury and the couple summered in the town. Several of Anderson's best-known compositions were written at the house.
Charles Ives		Charles Ives House*	1874-1893	Danbury; 41.3815962°N 73.4446899°W	Irving was born in this home, with his family occupying it even after Irving's death in 1954. Though he moved out in 1893, he would often visit his family.

== Georgia ==
Musician	Image	Residence	Years	Coordinates	Notes
The Allman Brothers Band		The Allman Brothers Band Museum (The Big House)	1970-1973	Macon; 32.84598922729492°N 83.65595245361328°W	Home of members of The Allman Brothers Band, as well as family and friends for a period in the 1970s. "Ramblin' Man" and "Blue Sky" were written at the house.
Little Richard		Little Richard House and Resource Center	1932-c. 1950	Macon; 32.8419204°N 83.6467323°W	Richard was born in this house, which has been moved from its original location. It is currently open for tours.

== Illinois ==
Musician	Image	Residence	Years	Coordinates	Notes
Viktor Krauss		American Football House	c. 1990-2001	Urbana; 40.76594543457031°N 95.3755874633789°W	Though once owned by musician Viktor Krauss, the house is most notable for its appearance on the cover of American Football's 1999 self-titled album, though no member of the band ever lived in the house. It is currently available as an Airbnb.

== Indiana ==
Musician	Image	Residence	Years	Coordinates	Notes
The Jackson Family		Michael Jackson Childhood Home	1949-1969	Gary; 41.57672°N 87.34383°W	Members of the Jackson Family, including The Jackson 5, Janet Jackson, and Michael Jackson, were raised in this house. Joe Jackson formed The Jackson 5 in this house, where he would have his children rehearse in the living room.

== Iowa ==
Musician	Image	Residence	Years	Coordinates	Notes
The Everly Brothers		Everly Brothers Childhood Home	1945-1953	Shenandoah; 40.76594543457031°N 95.3755874633789°W	Brothers Don and Phil Everly lived in this house while their professional careers began as child stars during the Golden Age of Radio. The house has been relocated from its original location.
Glenn Miller		Glenn Miller Birthplace Museum	1904-1906	Clarinda; 40.7327329°N 95.0388017°W	Miller was born in this house, which is now part of a larger museum complex in Clarinda dedicated to his work.
Meredith Willson		Meredith Willson Boyhood Home	1902-1919	Mason City; 40.7327329°N 95.0388017°W	Willson's birthplace home. Willson wrote The Music Man (1957), and his boyhood home stands beside "Music Man Square", a replica exhibit of Main Street in River City as it looked in the early 1900s.

== Minnesota ==
Musician	Image	Residence	Years	Coordinates	Notes
Bob Dylan (1)		Bob Dylan Childhood Home	1948-1959	Hibbing; 47.422417°N 92.9337985°W	Childhood home of Dylan, who won the 2016 Nobel Prize in Literature. Though privately owned, it is occasionally open for tours.
Prince		Paisley Park	c. 2010-2016	Chanhassen; 44.8616656°N 93.560672°W	Opened in 1987 as a recording studio owned by Prince; Prince lived at the property for several years before his death. The site is currently operates as a museum.

== Mississippi ==
Musician	Image	Residence	Years	Coordinates	Notes
Elvis Presley (1)		Elvis Presley Birthplace	1935-1938	Tupelo; 34.2599715°N 88.6799394°W	Presley was born in this house, which is now the centerpiece of the Elvis Presley Birthplace and Park.

== Missouri ==
Musician	Image	Residence	Years	Coordinates	Notes
Scott Joplin		Scott Joplin House State Historic Site^{†}	1901-1903	St. Louis; 38.6370177°N 90.2142409°W	Joplin wrote "The Entertainer" while living in the house. It currently operates as a museum.

== New York ==
Musician	Image	Residence	Years	Coordinates	Notes
Louis Armstrong		Louis Armstrong House^{†}	1943-1971	Queens; 40.7545676°N 73.8615434°W	Armstrong lived at the property for much of his professional career; now open as a museum.
John Coltrane (1), Alice Coltrane		John Coltrane Home*	1964-1973	Dix Hills; 40.799803°N 73.324286°W	John composed A Love Supreme and many compositions in his practice room while living at the property. The house's basement was the site of Coltrane Studios, where Alice recorded several of her early albums. The site is currently undergoing historic renovations.
Bob Dylan (2), The Band		Big Pink	1967	Saugerties; 42.0777982°N 74.0513024°W	Dylan and The Band recorded The Basement Tapes here in 1967. The Band's first album, Music From Big Pink (1968), was partially written at the property. The site is currently an Airbnb.
Charlie Parker		Charlie Parker Residence*	1950-1954	New York City; 40.72653°N 73.97992°W	Bird lived at this residence with his wife, Chan Richardson, shortly before his death in 1955. He and Richardson's two children were born during this time, and Parker would frequently perform at local jazz clubs and music venues during his residency.The site is closed to the public, but a plaque marks its significance.

== North Dakota ==
Musician	Image	Residence	Years	Coordinates	Notes
Peggy Lee		Midland Continental Depot Transportation Museum Featuring Peggy Lee*	1934-1937	Wimbledon; 47.168619°N 98.4591106°W	Lee, whose father was a depot agent, lived and worked at Wimbledon's Midland Continental Railroad Depot. The depot now houses an exhibit on her life and the history of the railroad.

== Pennsylvania ==
Musician	Image	Residence	Years	Coordinates	Notes
Marian Anderson		Marian Anderson House*	1924-1943	Philadelphia; 39.942272°N 75.174843°W	Anderson purchased the house in 1924; it stands across the street from the Union Baptist Church, where she sang as a child. The house currently operates as a museum.
John Coltrane (2)		John Coltrane House^{†}	1952-1967	Philadelphia; 39.980319°N 75.189139°W	Coltrane purchased this house after leaving the United States Navy, living in it full time from 1952 to 1958 and using it as an alternative residence to his more notable home in Dix Hills, New York until his death in 1967. Though a Pennsylvania State Historic Marker denotes the site, is currently closed to the public with future plans for renovation.

== Tennessee ==
Musician	Image	Residence	Years	Coordinates	Notes
Elvis Presley (2)		Elvis Presley House*	1956-1957	Memphis; 35.103344°N 89.919781°W	Before moving to Graceland, Presley and his parents lived in this house, which is not open to the public. The house was purchased in part by the royalties made from Presley's single "Heartbreak Hotel".
Elvis Presley (3)		Graceland^{†}	1957-1977	Memphis; 35.0457404°N 90.0230725°W	Graceland is the second most-visited house museum in the United States, having been visited by many celebrities and world leaders.

== Virginia ==
Musician	Image	Residence	Years	Coordinates	Notes
A.P. Carter		A.P. Carter Birthplace Cabin	1891-c. 1920s	Hiltons; 36.668288°N 82.412878°W	A.P. Carter, the patriarch of the Carter Family, was born and raised in this cabin, which is now a part of the Carter Family Fold concert venue.
