= A. S. Staley High School =

High school in Americus, Georgia, US (1936–1968)

Location
- 915 North Lee Street, Americus, Georgia, U.S.
- 32.08458°N 84.23042°W

Information
- Other name: Staley High School
- School type: Public, African-American
- Opened: October 1936
- Closed: June 1968

A. S. Staley High School, also known as Staley High School, was a secondary school for African American students active from 1936 until 1968 in Americus, Georgia. It was the last segregated high school in the city of Americus.

== History ==
The A. S. Staley High School opened on October 1936, on the site of the Americus Institute (1897–1932), a private black school. It was named in honor of Rev. Alfred Samuel Staley (1861–1927), an educator and the former principal of the McCay Hill School, an earlier African American school in Americus. The school primarily taught manual and domestic education.

In 1940, it was one of the sixteen distinguished schools for Black students selected to participate in the Rockefeller Foundation's Association of Colleges and Secondary Schools for Negroes’ Secondary School Study.

=== Closure ===
The civil rights era in Americus was a time of great turmoil. A. S. Staley High School was the last segregated high school in the city of Americus, when it closed in 1968. Continuing Black high school students were sent to Americus High School, which had been founded as a segregated white school, and was racially integrated in 1968. An urban renewal project named the "Stanley High Area Urban Renewal" launched in the neighborhood of the former school was months after the school's closure. By 1970, the building was used for a middle school campus, Staley Middle School, which was racially integrated.

Daniel T. Grant served as the school principal until 1951, and wrote his autobiography, When the Melon is Ripe (1955, Exposition Press Inc.) about his experiences. Grant had instituted the school's band program.

South Carolina's Museum of Education featured the school in an exhibition in 2011.

== See also ==
- National Register of Historic Places listings in Sumter County, Georgia
- Campbell Chapel A.M.E. Church in Americus
