= Storehouse =

Storehouse may refer to:

- Storehouse plc, British retail conglomerate
- Warehouse, a building for storing goods
- Bishop's storehouse, humanitarian centers owned by The Church of Jesus Christ of Latter-day Saints providing groceries and other supplies to community members in need
- Dismuke Storehouse, 1899 historic commercial building and grocery store in Americus, Georgia, US
