= Campbell Chapel A.M.E. Church (Americus, Georgia) =

Historic building in Georgia, US

- U.S. National Register of Historic Places
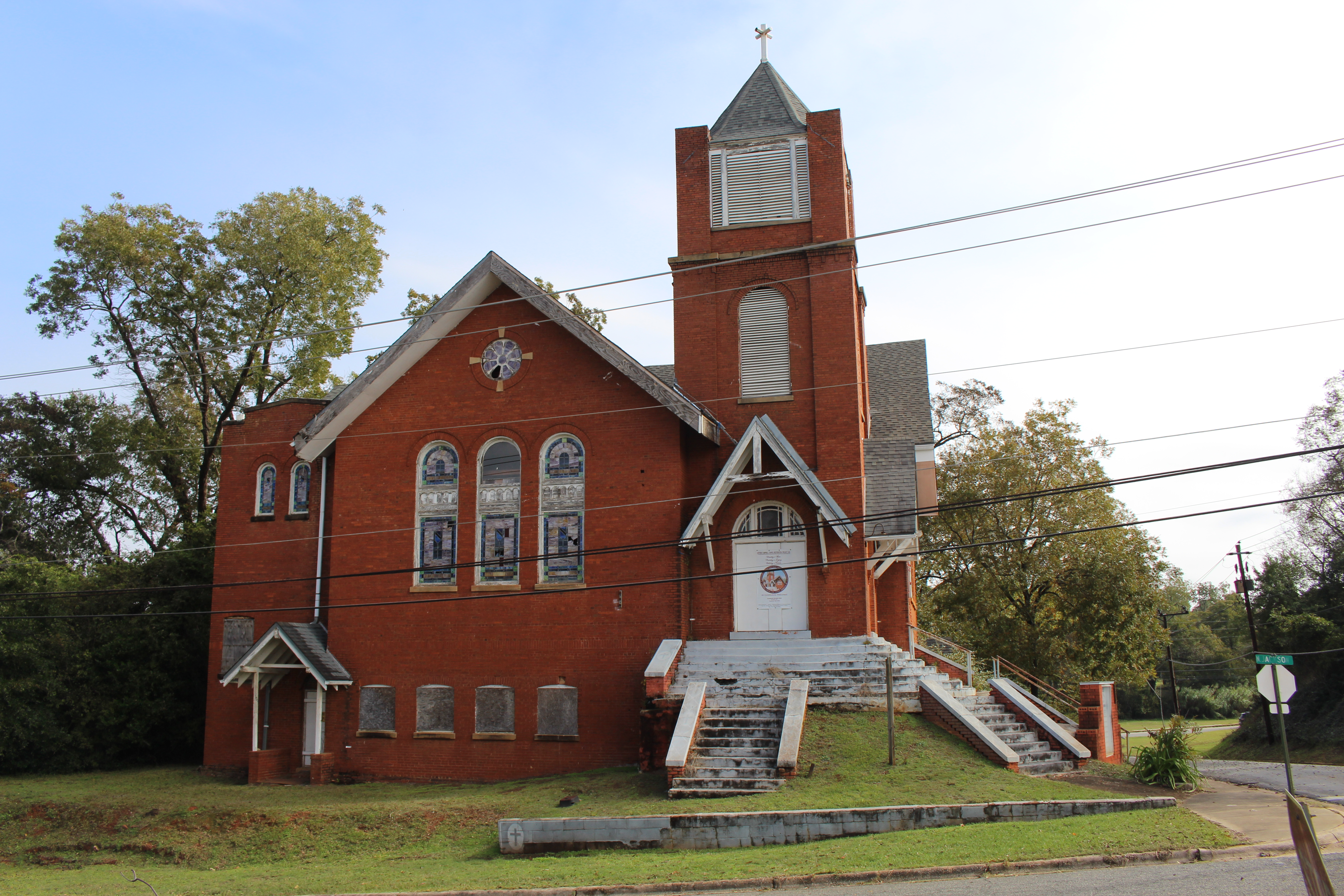

- Location within Georgia
- Location: 429 North Jackson St., Americus, Sumter Co., Georgia, United States
- Coordinates: 32°04′37″N 84°14′01″W
- Area: less than one acre
- Built: 1920
- Architect: Louis Hudson Presley
- Architectural style: Romanesque Revival
- NRHP reference No.: 97001195
- Added to NRHP: September 30, 1997

Campbell Chapel A.M.E. Church is a historic building for the African Methodist Episcopal Church in the city of Americus in Sumter County, Georgia, U.S.. It has been listed on the National Register of Historic Places since September 30, 1997, and is significant in architecture and for local African American heritage.

== Pre-history ==
The first Christian black church in Americus was the Bethesda Baptist, founded in 1866, after of the American Civil War ended. The Campbell Chapel A.M.E. Church congregation was the second black church in Americus, founded in 1869. It was named after Bishop Jabez Pitt Campbell. The Campbell Chapel A.M.E. land was purchased from Mahala Bosworth on January 29, 1877. The first church was a wood framed, steepled church built by S. S. Sloan and Company. Church member Elbert Head, donated land in 1879 for the A.M.E. parsonage on Winn Street in Americus.

After the establishment of Campbell Chapel A.M.E. Church, other A.M.E. churches were founded in Sumter County; including Allen Chapel A.M.E., St. Paul A.M.E. (1890), Mt. Creek A.M.E. (1893), and Mt. Carmel A.M.E..

== History ==
The present Campbell Chapel A.M.E. Church brick building was completed in 1920, and designed by black architect Louis Hudson Presley. That same year in 1920, Presley had become the first African American architect registered with the Georgia State Board of Registered Architects.

This building has been the headquarters for the church since it was built in 1920, and has played an important role in the black community in southern Georgia. It has hosted conferences, revivals, various entertainment events, and guest lectures. On March 29, 1926, Bishop W. Sampson Brooks (1865–1939) gave a guest lecture to the congregation at this church.

== Architecture ==
It is a two-story brick building in a Romanesque Revival style, featuring a gabled roof with overhanging eaves, dormer windows, a brick belfry, stained glass windows, and a rose window.

== See also ==
- National Register of Historic Places listings in Sumter County, Georgia
- Americus Institute (1897–1932) former private black school in Americus
- A. S. Staley High School (1936–1968) former public black high school in Americus
