= Dismukes =

Dismukes is a surname. Notable people with the surname include:

- Andrew Dismukes (born 1995), American comedian
- Dizzy Dismukes (1890–1961), American baseball player and manager
- John Taylor Dismukes, artist
- Leslie Cooley Dismukes, American lawyer and politician
- Reese Dismukes (born 1992), American football player

== See also ==
- Aaron Dismuke (born 1992), American voice actor
- Dismuke Storehouse in Americus, Georgia, US; NRHP-listed
