= Minyard =

Minyard may refer to:

- Ken Minyard (born 1939), American radio personality
- Minyard Food Stores, a supermarket chain in Texas, US
- Dismuke Storehouse, also known as Minyard's Store, Americus, Georgia, US
