= Avenue B (Manhattan) =

Avenue in Manhattan, New York

Avenue B / East End Avenue
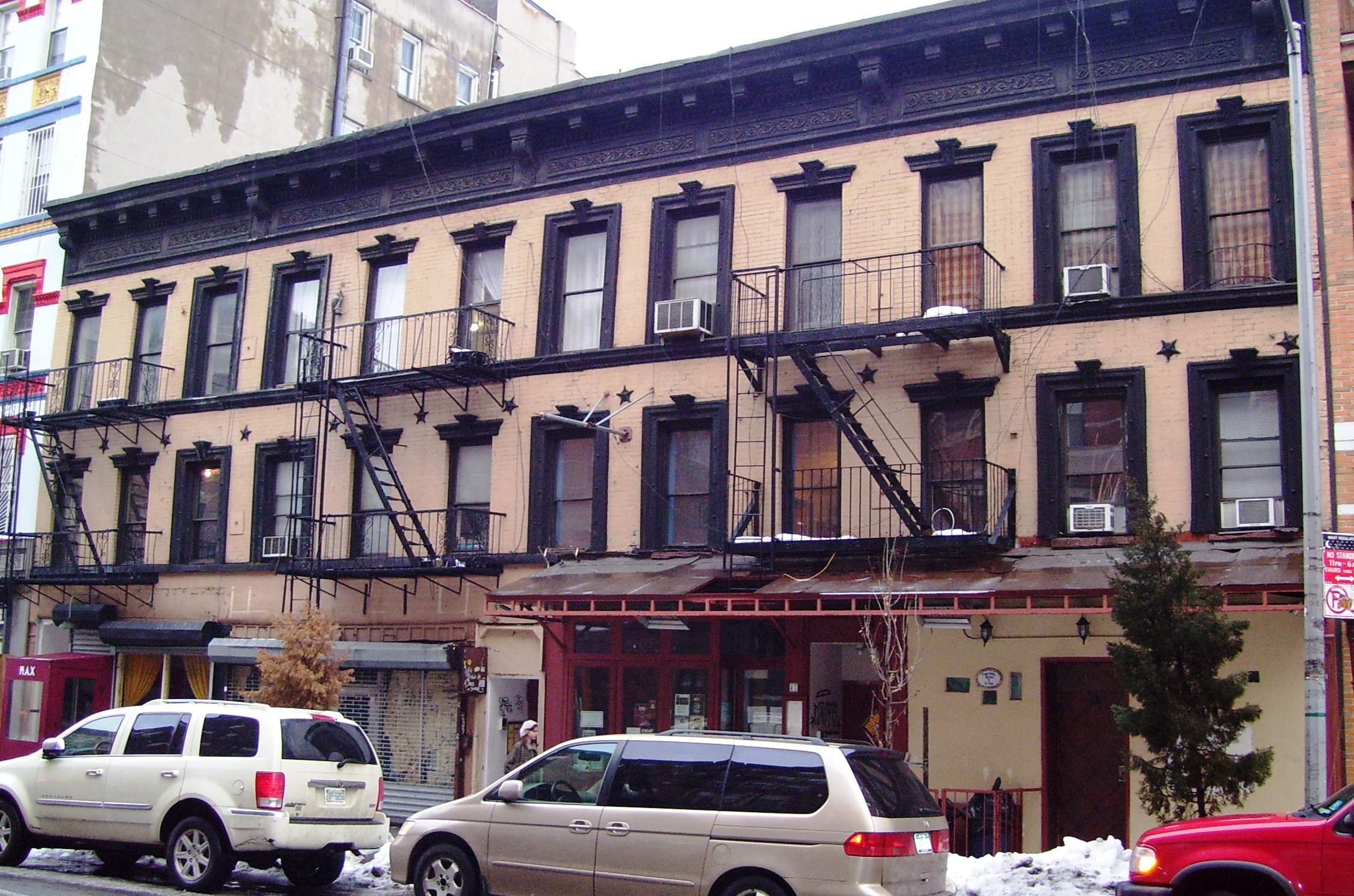
- 45–51 Avenue B between 3rd and 4th Streets
- From: East Houston Street
- To: East 14th Street
- East: Avenue C
- West: Avenue A

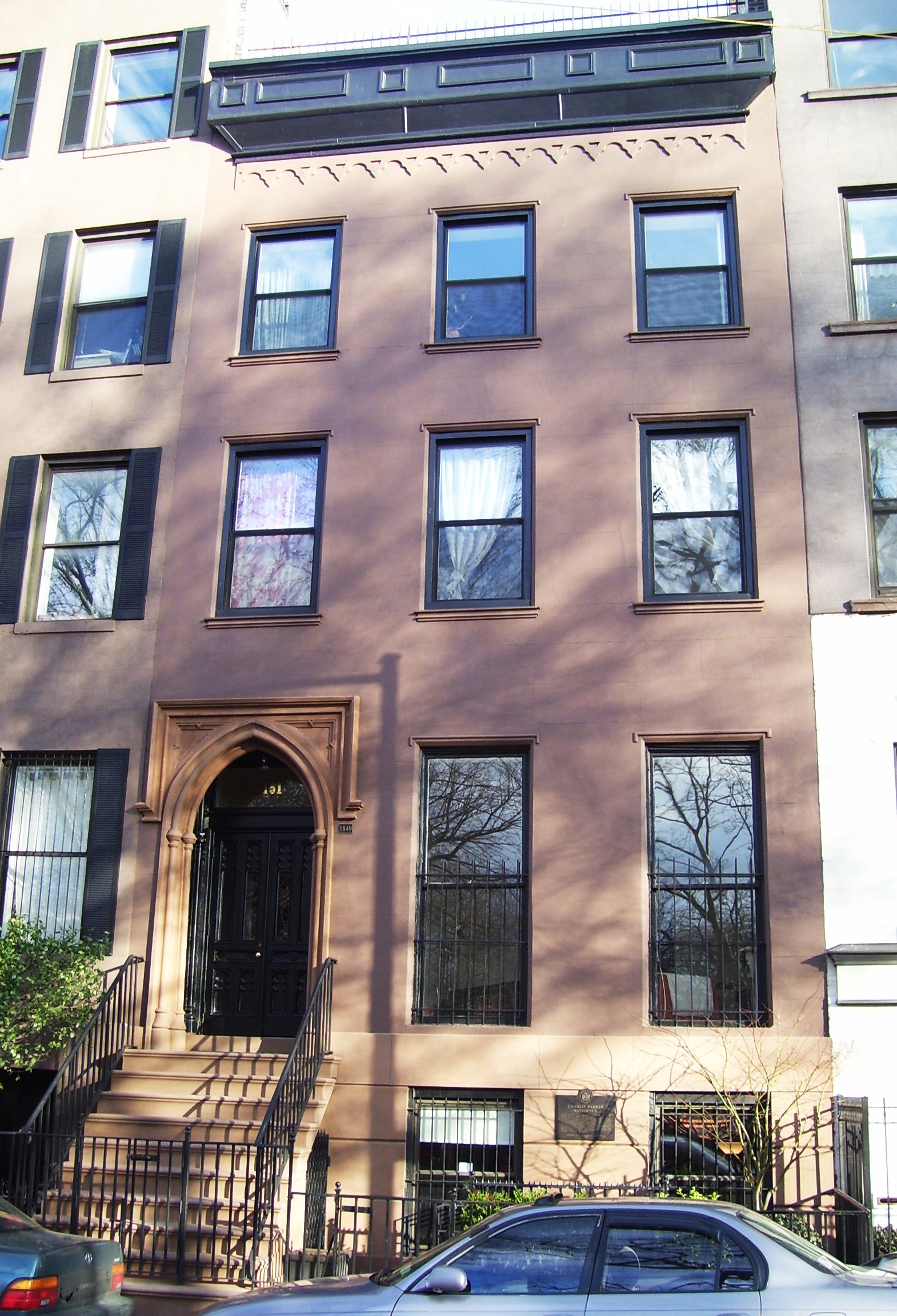
The landmarked Charlie Parker Residence

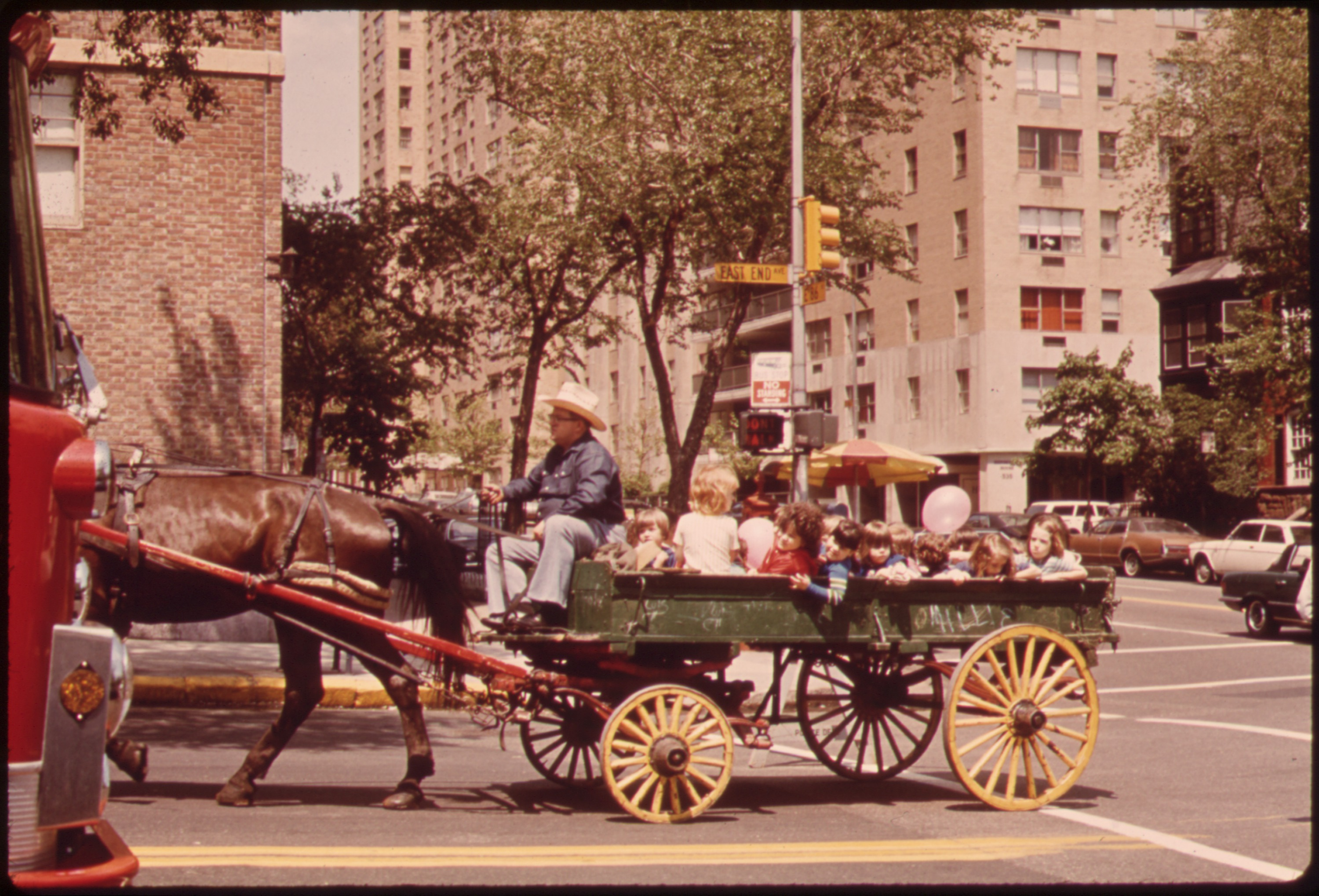
Spring Festival on East End Avenue (1973)

Avenue B is a north–south avenue located in the Alphabet City area of the East Village neighborhood of Manhattan, New York City, east of Avenue A and west of Avenue C. It runs from Houston Street to 14th Street, where it continues into a loop road in Stuyvesant Town, to be connected with Avenue A. Below Houston Street, Avenue B continues as Clinton Street to South Street. It is the eastern border of Tompkins Square Park.

== History ==
The street was created by the Commissioners' Plan of 1811 as one of 16 north-south streets specified as 100 feet (30 m) in width, including 12 numbered avenues and four designated by letter located east of First Avenue. In 1824, prior to any construction, its width was reduced to 60 feet (18 m), the standard for cross-streets, by taking 40 feet (12 m) from the east side. The city reasoned that the lettered avenues were "incapable of use as thoroughfares to and from the City" and could not "be considered as avenues in the proper Sense of the term."

== East End Avenue ==
On the Upper East Side, East End Avenue, a principally residential street, runs from East 79th Street to East 90th Street through the Yorkville neighborhood. It was called Avenue B under the original Commissioners' Plan of 1811 before being renamed. Carl Schurz Park, the location of Gracie Mansion, is adjacent to the avenue at this point. In 1928, the New York City Board of Estimate ruled that development below East 84th Street was restricted to residential use.

== Landmarks ==
- The Christodora House, a former women's Settlement House and now a condominium, is located on Avenue B at 9th Street.
- The Charlie Parker Residence at 151 Avenue B between 9th and 10th Streets, where jazz musician Charlie "Bird" Parker lived from 1950 to 1954, is a New York City landmark.
- The Henderson Place Historic District, a New York City landmark on the National Register of Historic Places, is located on East End Avenue between 86th and 87th Streets.
- Gracie Mansion, a New York City landmark and official residence of the mayor of New York City, is located on East End Avenue at 88th Street.

== Transportation ==
Currently, there is no bus that travels on Avenue B. The M9 bus formerly used this street from East Houston Street to 14th Street.

== In popular culture ==
- In 1922 Fanny Brice recorded "The Sheik of Avenue B", a parody of "The Sheik of Araby" written by Harry Ruby and Bert Kalmar
