= First African Methodist Episcopal Church (Athens, Georgia) =

Church in Athens, Georgia, USA

- U.S. National Register of Historic Places
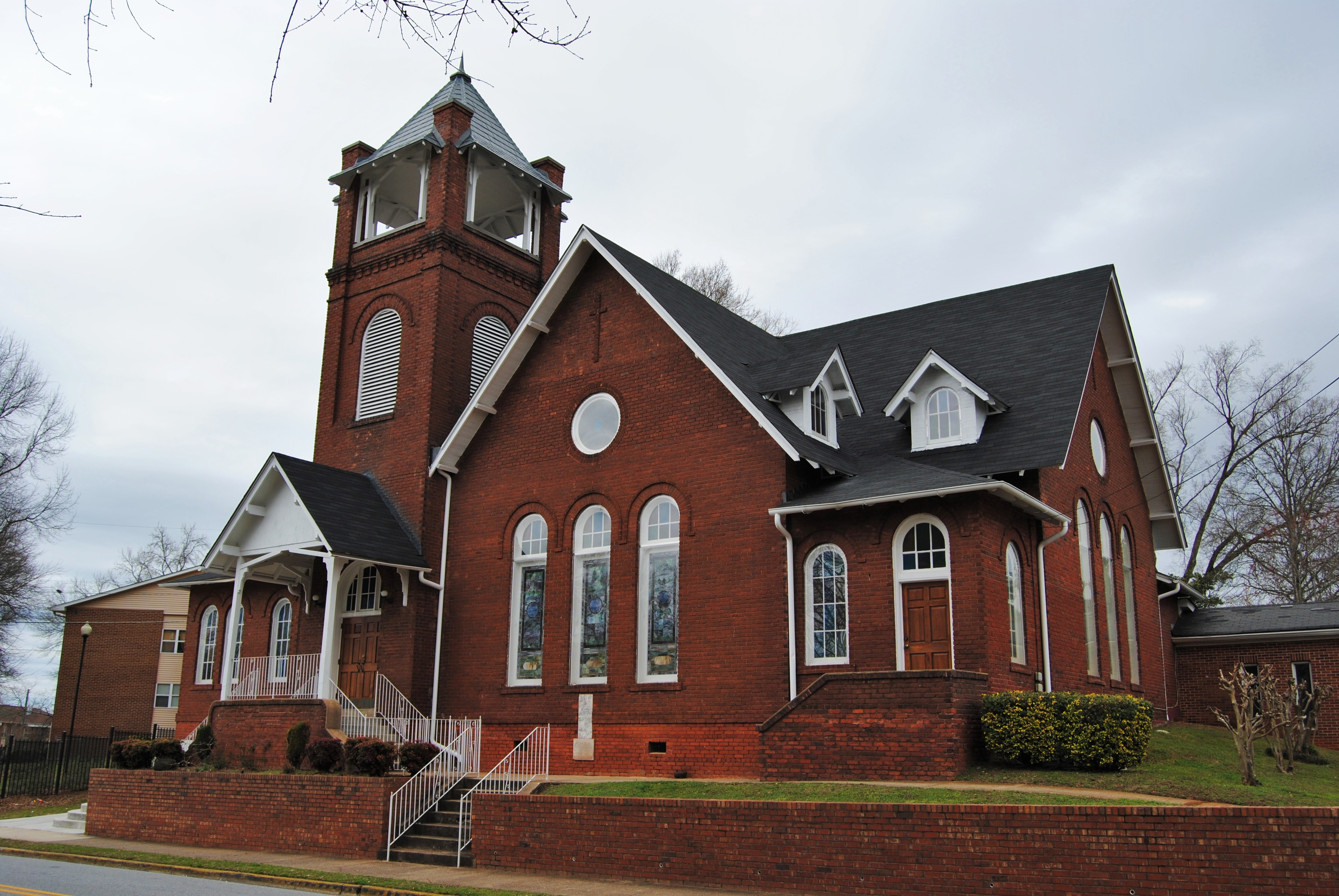
- First AME Church in 2015
- Location: 521 North Hull Street, Athens, Athens–Clarke County, Georgia, U.S.
- Coordinates: 33.960626°N 83.379217°W
- Built: 1916
- Architect: Louis H. Persley
- NRHP reference No.: 80000991
- Added to NRHP: March 10, 1980

The First African Methodist Episcopal Church (First AME Church), formerly known as Pierce’s Chapel, is an AME church established in 1866 by Rev. Henry McNeal Turner, and located at 521 North Hull Street in Athens, Georgia.

It is listed on the National Register of Historic Places since March 10, 1980.

== History ==
First African Methodist Episcopal Church was the first African American church in Athens. In 1881, the congregation purchased the lot on N. Hull Street, the present church location. Louis H. Persley, the first African American registered architect in Georgia, designed the building in 1916. While the congregation's church building was being constructed in 1916 services were held at Union Hall in what is now the Morton Theatre.

The original church's basement of the church was used as a school for children and adults. It was named Pierce's Chapel in honor of Reverend Lovick Pierce, a white minister who helped organize the congregation in a building on the Oconee River. The educational center was opened in 1964, under the leadership of Rev. Dr. Clayton Duke Wilkerson. The church had a parsonage located at 147 Strong Street, built in 1921 and demolished as part of an urban renewal project in the 1960s.

In 2017, the church received a new pastor, B.A. Hart.

== See also ==
- National Register of Historic Places listings in Clarke County, Georgia
