= Liberty Hall (Americus, Georgia) =

Historic house in Georgia, United States

- U.S. National Register of Historic Places
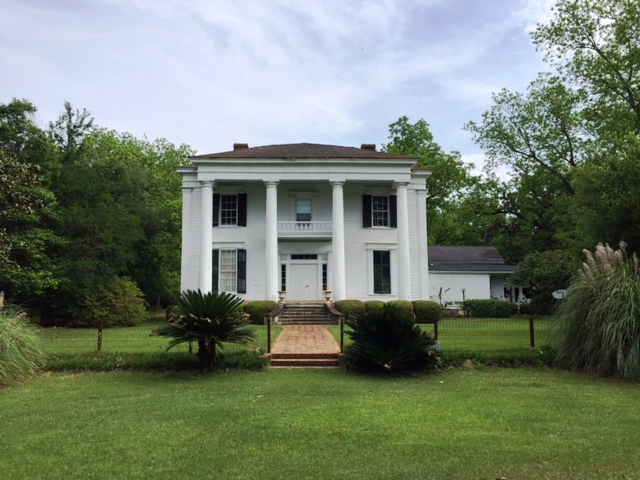

- Location within Georgia
- Location: South Lea Street Road
- Nearest city: Americus, Georgia
- Coordinates: 31.95065°N 84.2003°W
- Area: 607 acres (246 ha)
- Built: c.1861
- Architectural style: Greek Revival
- NRHP reference No.: 80001236
- Added to NRHP: November 25, 1980

Liberty Hall is a historic plantation house from c. 1861 within the Simpson Plantation, located southeast of Americus, Georgia on South Lee Street. This site was known for cotton production, worked by enslaved people prior to 1865. The plantation house was added to the National Register of Historic Places on November 25, 1980.

== History ==
It is a two-story frame building 50 feet (15 m) by 36 feet (11 m) in plan, built c. 1861 by Thomas Dixon Speer. The plantation was 3,000 acres (1,200 ha) in size, and was worked by 39 enslaved African Americans prior to the end of the American Civil War in 1865. The farming operation at its peak produced 23,200 pounds of ginned cotton, 2000 bushels of maize, as well as peas and beans, sweet potatoes, livestock, and molasses.

It is architecture is notable for its Greek Revival style, including its four-column portico. It has a hipped roof. It has a one-story kitchen addition built c.1888. In 1980, the property size shrunk and only 607 acres (246 ha) still exist.

It was owned by the Speer family for more than 100 years. It was sold in 1874 to Thomas Simpson, who later deeded the plantation to his son, George R. Simpson.

== See also ==
- National Register of Historic Places listings in Sumter County, Georgia
