= Beda-Etta College =

- Macon, Georgia; United States

Information
- Type: Business College
- Established: 1921
- Founder: Minnie Lee Smith
- Closed: 1955

The Beda-Etta College, also known as Beda-Etta Business College, was a private business-focused junior college and commercial high school in the Pleasant Hill neighborhood of Macon, Georgia active from 1921 to 1955.

== History ==
The Beda-Etta College was founded and operated by Minnie Lee Smith, a public school teacher, who named it for her two deceased sisters, and who paid for it with her own money. The school mainly taught courses to students of color related to business and commerce before offering a wider range of subjects. The school was said to be the first business school in Georgia, and its courses ("typing, shorthand, bookkeeping, and banking") were taken by "many of Macon's future black leaders".

Smith died in 1956 and is buried at Linwood Cemetery in Macon. The Tubman African American Museum has the school's 1923 cornerstone.
