= National Register of Historic Places listings in Sumter County, Georgia =

This is a list of properties and districts in Sumter County, Georgia that are listed on the National Register of Historic Places (NRHP).

This National Park Service list is complete through NPS recent listings posted May 16, 2025.

== Current listings ==
	Name on the Register	Image	Date listed	Location	City or town	Description
1	Americus Historic District	Americus Historic District	January 1, 1976 (#76000648)	Irregular pattern along Lee St. with extensions to Dudley St., railroad tracks, Rees Park, and Glessner St.; also E. Church St. and Oak Grove Cemetery; 32°04′02″N 84°14′05″W	Americus	Church St. and cemetery represent a boundary increase of September 3, 1979
2	Andersonville National Historic Site	Andersonville National Historic Site	October 16, 1970 (#70000070)	1 mi. E of Andersonville on GA 49; 32°12′23″N 84°07′24″W	Andersonville	National Historic Site
3	Ashby Street Shotgun Row Historic District	Ashby Street Shotgun Row Historic District	June 27, 1997 (#97000620)	207, 209, and 211 Ashby St. 32°04′38″N 84°13′39″W	Americus	
4	Campbell Chapel AME Church	Campbell Chapel AME Church	September 30, 1997 (#97001195)	429 N. Jackson St. 32°04′38″N 84°14′01″W	Americus	
5	Dismuke Storehouse		March 7, 1996 (#96000247)	505 N. Lee St. 32°04′38″N 84°13′56″W	Americus	
6	Guerry-Mitchell House		June 16, 1983 (#83000242)	723 McGarrah St. 32°04′47″N 84°14′16″W	Americus	
7	Jimmy Carter National Historic Site	Jimmy Carter National Historic Site	December 23, 1987 (#01000272)	300 N. Bond St. 32°01′49″N 84°25′06″W	Plains	administered by the National Park Service
8	Liberty Hall	Liberty Hall	November 25, 1980 (#80001236)	SE of Americus on S. Lee St. 31°57′02″N 84°12′01″W	Americus	
9	Lustron House at 547 Oak Avenue		March 18, 1996 (#96000209)	547 Oak Ave. 32°03′48″N 84°14′07″W	Americus	
10	Newman McBain House		February 8, 1980 (#80001237)	S of Americus on U.S. 19; 32°02′33″N 84°15′13″W	Americus	US 19 was realigned further to the west of the house.
11	Morgan Farm		February 26, 1998 (#98000145)	770 Old Dawson Rd. 31°59′41″N 84°16′56″W	Smithville	
12	New Corinth Baptist Church		August 10, 1998 (#98000928)	1178 Hooks Mill Rd. 31°58′24″N 84°10′59″W	Americus	
13	Plains Historic District	Plains Historic District	June 28, 1984 (#84001220)	Roughly bounded by Buena Vista Rd., Hospital, Clark, Main, Thomas, Paschal, and Bond Sts. 32°02′13″N 84°23′41″W	Plains	
14	Teel–Crawford–Gaston Plantation		October 27, 2004 (#04001188)	2154 GA 30 W 32°08′40″N 84°23′43″W	Americus	
15	Third District A & M School-Georgia Southwestern College Historic District	Third District A & M School-Georgia Southwestern College Historic District	September 27, 2007 (#07001002)	800 Wheatley St. 32°03′28″N 84°13′09″W	Americus	Contains eight contributing properties in the center of Georgia Southwestern State University
16	Webb Family Farm	Webb Family Farm	September 5, 1985 (#85001968)	US 19; 31°56′44″N 84°15′24″W	Sumter	Location of the main house - more to the south
