= Little Richard House and Resource Center =

Childhood home of Little Richard

Little Richard House
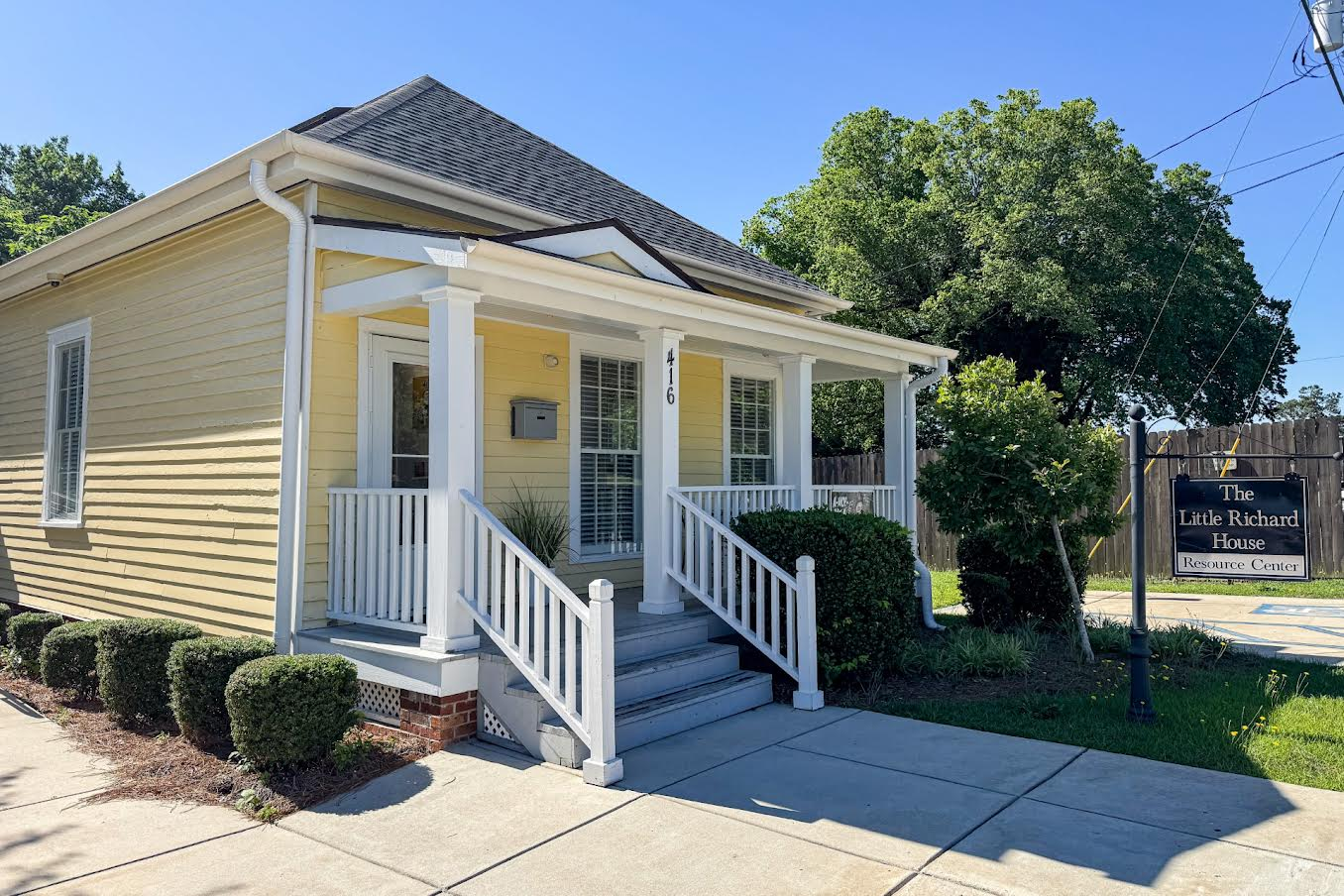
- Exterior of the house in 2016.
- Interactive map of the Little Richard House area

General information
- Type: Residential home
- Architectural style: Minimal Traditional; Shotgun house
- Location: 416 Craft St, Macon, GA, United States
- Coordinates: 32°50′33″N 83°38′47″W
- Completed: 1920

Technical details
- Floor count: 1
- Floor area: 850 square feet (79 m^{2})

The Little Richard House, officially the Little Richard House and Research Center, is a historic house museum located at 416 Craft Street in Macon, Georgia, where American musician Little Richard spent his childhood. The house was moved to its present location in 2017; while Richard lived in the home, it was located on 5th Avenue in the Pleasant Hill neighborhood in Macon. The house opened as a museum in 2019 with the stated goal of being "a vibrant cultural hub dedicated to celebrating the life and legacy of the rock 'n' roll pioneer".

== Description and history ==
=== General ===
The house was built in 1920 in the Pleasant Hill neighborhood of Macon, a historically black section of the city in a shotgun style typical of many low-income homes of the period. The house is painted yellow and has a front porch on the exterior. While the house originally had two bedrooms and a kitchen, the house no longer retains any furniture, as it has been completely renovated as a museum housing Richard memorabilia. A piano in the house is available for public use, though it is not original to the site.

=== History ===
Richard's parents, Leva Mae (née Stewart) and Charles "Bud" Penniman were living in the house when Little Richard (born Richard Wayne Penniman) was born on December 5, 1932. Richard was the third of twelve children. According to biographer Charles White, Richard left home at the age of fourteen when his father, a deacon, became suspicious of his sexuality. Macon lived in Macon for three more years after this, eventually leaving Macon in 1949 to join Hudson's Medicine Show, a traveling concert revue.

The house originally stood at 1540 Fifth Avenue in Macon. In 2017, the house was moved to its present location to prevent demolition during the expansion of Interstates 75 and 16 through Macon. It opened as the Little Richard House and Research Center in 2019 and holds community events, concerts, and historic walking tours of the Pleasant Hill neighborhood. In May 2024, the museum closed due to a lapse in funding from the Macon-Bibb County Community Enhancement Authority. It has since reopened to the public.
