= Smithville, Georgia =

- City
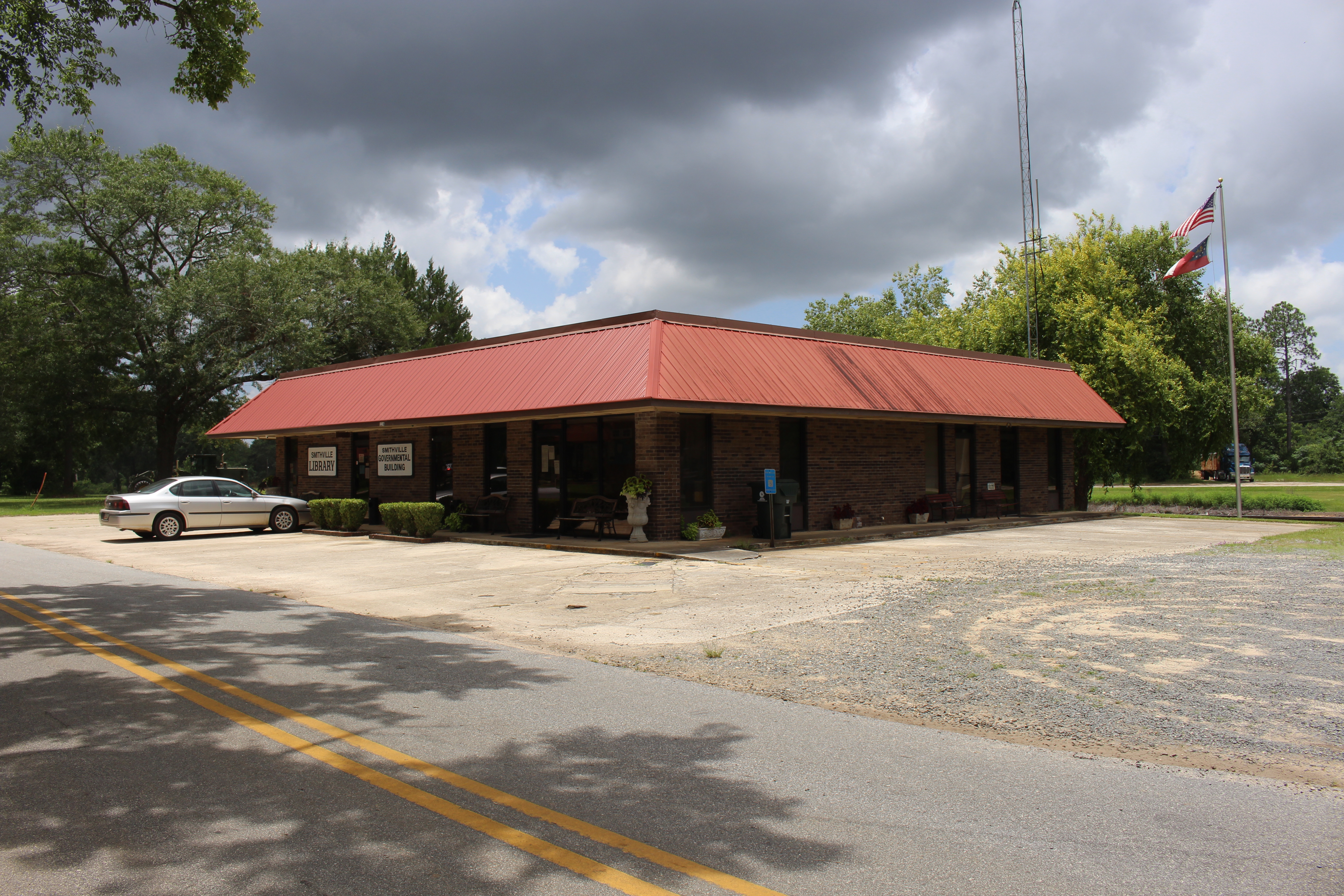
- Smithville Governmental Building and Library

- Location in Lee County and the state of Georgia
- Coordinates: 31°54′7″N 84°15′19″W
- Country: United States
- State: Georgia
- County: Lee

Area
  - Total: 2.54 sq mi (6.59 km^{2})
  - Land: 2.54 sq mi (6.59 km^{2})
  - Water: 0 sq mi (0.00 km^{2})
- Elevation: 330 ft (100 m)

Population (2020)
  - Total: 593
  - Density: 233.0/sq mi (89.98/km^{2})
- Time zone: UTC-5 (Eastern (EST))
  - Summer (DST): UTC-4 (EDT)
- ZIP code: 31787
- Area code: 229
- FIPS code: 13-71464
- GNIS feature ID: 0356540
- Website: cityofsmithvillegeorgia.org

Smithville is a city in Lee County, Georgia, United States. The population was 593 in 2020. It is part of the Albany, Georgia metropolitan statistical area.

== History ==
A post office was established at Smithville in 1871. The community was named after the local Smith family. The Georgia General Assembly incorporated Smithville as a town in 1863.

The Morgan Farm is located near Smithville, and is a late-19th century historic, rural African American farmstead recognized as a Centennial Farm (1995) by the state of Georgia, and listed as on the National Register of Historic Places (1998).

== Geography ==
Smithville is located in northwestern Lee County at 31°54′7″N 84°15′19″W (31.902073, -84.255336). It is bordered to the north by the Sumter County line.

U.S. Route 19 runs through the west side of the city, leading south 12 miles (19 km) to Leesburg, the Lee county seat, and north 13 miles (21 km) to Americus. Georgia State Route 118 passes through the center of Smithville, leading east 12 miles (19 km) to Leslie and southwest 14 miles (23 km) to Dawson.

According to the United States Census Bureau, the city has a total area of 2.5 square miles (6.5 km^{2}), all of it recorded as land. Muckaloochee Creek forms the northeast border of the city. The creek is a south-flowing tributary of Muckalee Creek and part of the Flint River watershed.

== Demographics ==
Historical population
Census	Pop.	Note	%±
1880	320		—
1900	597		—
1910	574		−3.9%
1920	761		32.6%
1930	777		2.1%
1940	619		−20.3%
1950	676		9.2%
1960	732		8.3%
1970	713		−2.6%
1980	867		21.6%
1990	804		−7.3%
2000	774		−3.7%
2010	575		−25.7%
2020	593		3.1%
U.S. Decennial Census; 1850-1870 1870-1880; 1890-1910 1920-1930; 1940 1950 1960; 1970 1980 1990; 2000 2010

=== Racial and ethnic composition ===
Smithville city, Georgia – Racial and ethnic composition Note: the US Census treats Hispanic/Latino as an ethnic category. This table excludes Latinos from the racial categories and assigns them to a separate category. Hispanics/Latinos may be of any race.
Race / Ethnicity (NH = Non-Hispanic)	Pop 2000	Pop 2010	Pop 2020	% 2000	% 2010	% 2020
White alone (NH)	221	130	163	28.55%	22.61%	27.49%
Black or African American alone (NH)	541	431	403	69.90%	74.96%	67.96%
Native American or Alaska Native alone (NH)	0	6	2	0.00%	1.04%	0.34%
Asian alone (NH)	0	1	5	0.00%	0.17%	0.84%
Native Hawaiian or Pacific Islander alone (NH)	0	0	0	0.00%	0.00%	0.00%
Other race alone (NH)	0	0	0	0.00%	0.00%	0.00%
Mixed race or Multiracial (NH)	4	2	8	0.52%	0.35%	1.35%
Hispanic or Latino (any race)	8	5	12	1.03%	0.87%	2.02%
Total	774	575	593	100.00%	100.00%	100.00%

=== 2020 census ===
As of the 2020 United States census, there were 593 people, 239 households, and 143 families residing in the city.

== Education ==
Public schools are operated by the Lee County School District. Students are zoned to Lee County High School.

== Notable people ==
- John Batts (1814–1878), planter and politician
- Bessie Jones (1902–1984), gospel and folk singer
- Bill McAfee (1907–1958), baseball player and mayor
- Tampa Red (1904–1981), also known as Hudson Woodbridge, Chicago blues and hokum musician in Blues Hall of Fame
- William J. Sears (1874–1944), congressman, from Florida
- Ja'Lia Taylor (born 1989) first woman to run for mayor of Smithville, academia, social justice activist

== Gallery ==
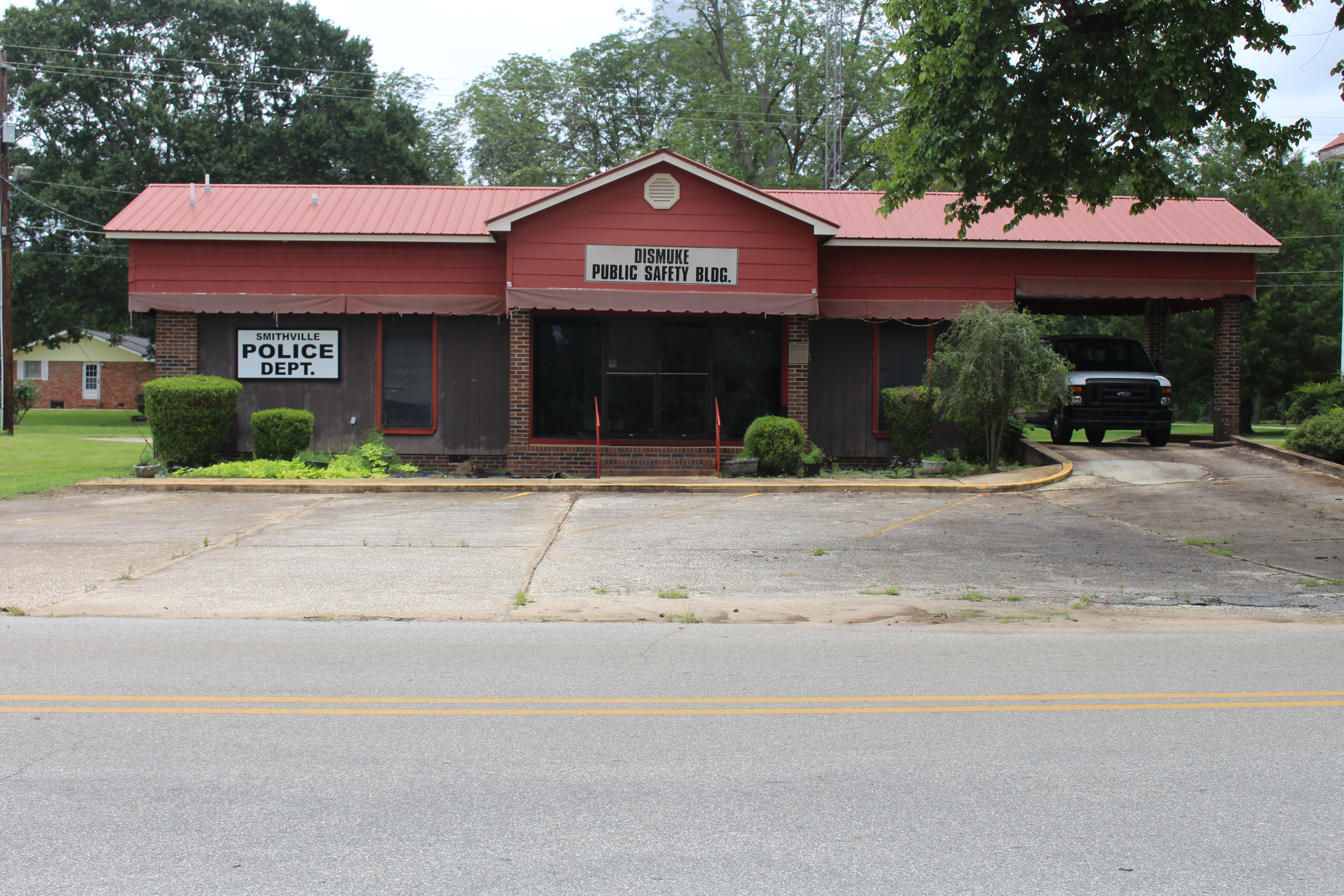
Dismuke Public Safety Building, houses the Smithville Police Department

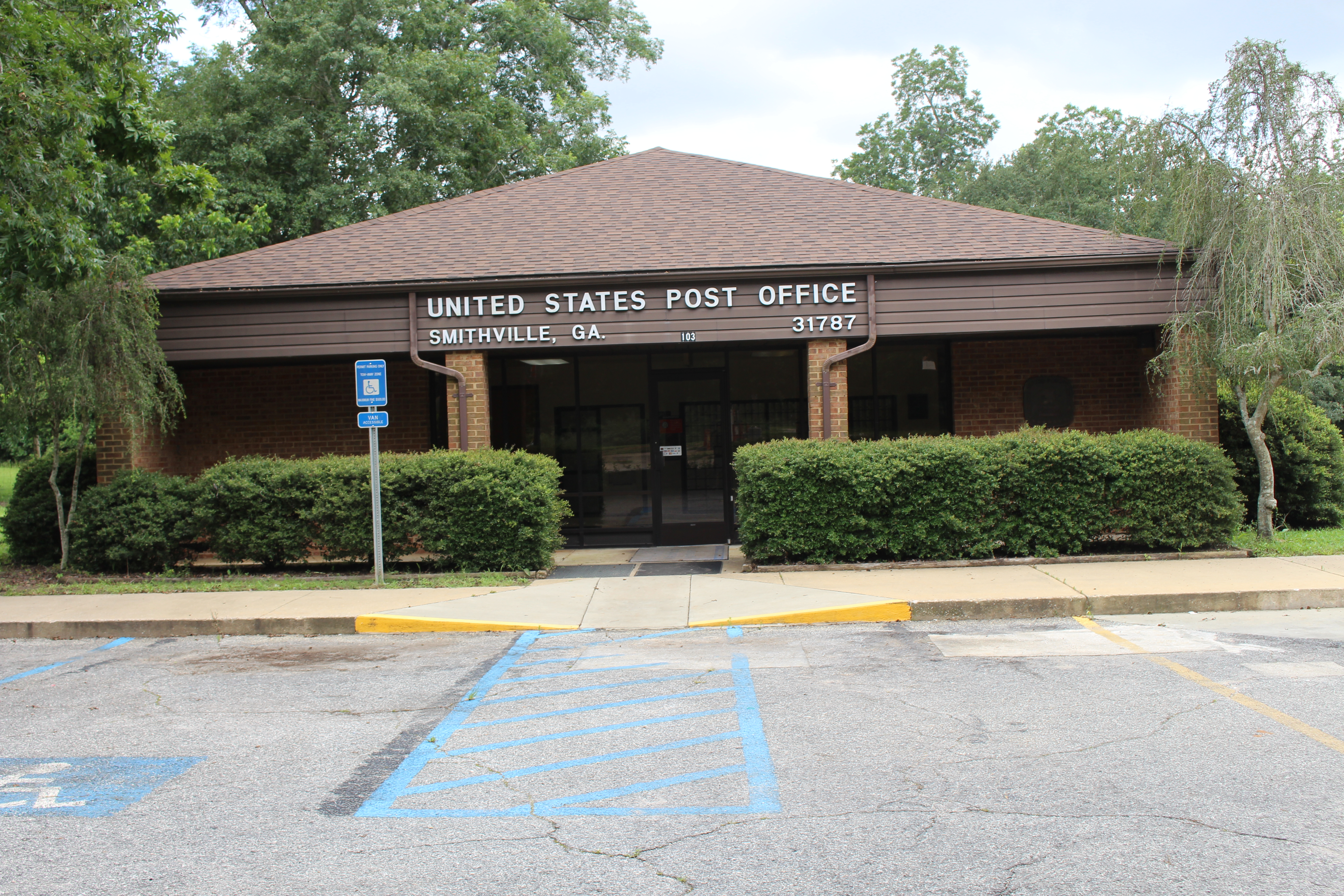
Smithville Post Office
