= Lovick Pierce =

American pastor, chaplain and author

Rev. Lovick Pierce (March 24, 1785 – November 9, 1879) was an American Pastor, Chaplain, and author. He was nicknamed the “Father of the Methodist Church in west Georgia”, and was the father of George Foster Pierce. Pierce was instrumental in Wesleyan College’s founding and served on the first Board of Trustees.

== Biography ==
Lovick Pierce was born on March 24, 1785, in Halifax County, North Carolina. He was a Methodist Chaplain for the United States Army in the War of 1812.

In 1836, Lovick joined St. Luke United Methodist Church in Columbus, Georgia. Around 1866, Pierce helped organize what became the First African Methodist Episcopal Church in Athens, Georgia, originally named Pierce's Chapel. Not to be confused with Pierce Chapel on the Wesleyan College campus, named after his son. A prolific author, Rev. Pierce was an early Southern proponent of the Holiness movement.

He died in Sparta, Georgia, on November 9, 1879.
