= John Batts =

American planter and politician (1814–1878)

Justice of the Georgia Inferior Court
- In office August 9, 1858 – January 10, 1861

Member of the Georgia State Senate
- In office 1859–1860

Member of the Georgia House of Representatives from Lee County
- In office 1857–1858

Justice of the Georgia Inferior Court
- In office 1856–1857

Personal details
- Born: September 11, 1814 Jefferson County, Georgia, U.S.
- Died: May 19, 1878 (aged 63) Smithville, Georgia, U.S.
- Resting place: Smithville Cemetery
- Party: Democratic
- Spouse: Mary Livingston
- Children: 13
- Occupation: planter politician

John A. Batts (September 11, 1814 – May 19, 1878) was an American planter, slaveowner, and politician. He sat in the Georgia General Assembly and was an inferior court judge.

== Career ==
Batts was a wealthy planter who enslaved at least 35 people on his plantation in Lee County, Georgia. He owned 2,250 acres of land, making him one of the largest landholders in the county.

In the late 1840s, Batts served on a regional committee to develop plans to construct a railroad through Lee County to the Georgia Central Line in Macon.

He served in the Georgia General Assembly, first as a representative of Lee County in the Georgia House of Representatives from 1857 to 1858 and then as a member of the Georgia State Senate from 1859 to 1860. He was a member of the senate when the state seceded from the Union but was not a member of the secession convention.

Batts was also a justice of the Georgia Inferior Court from 1856 to 1857 and again from 1858 to 1861. He also served as a delegate to a Democratic convention in Milledgeville to endorse John C. Breckinridge for president.

== Personal life ==
Batts was a Baptist.

He was married to Mary Livingston and had thirteen children. His son, William, served in the 12th Georgia Infantry Regiment of the Confederate States Army during the American Civil War and was killed at the Battle of Cedar Mountain. Following the war, Batts applied for a presidential pardon from President Andrew Johnson after emancipating his slaves and swearing allegiance to the United States.

He died by suicide, shooting himself in the head with a pistol, on May 19, 1878, after suffering from depression.
