= Morgan Farm (Sumter County, Georgia) =

Historic farmstead in Georgia, US

- U.S. National Register of Historic Places
- Location within Georgia
- Location: 770 Old Dawson Road
- Nearest city: Smithville, Georgia, U.S.
- Coordinates: 31.994722°N 84.282222°W
- Area: 117.4 acres (47.5 ha)
- Built: 1886
- Architectural style: Central hall
- NRHP reference No.: 98000145
- Added to NRHP: February 26, 1998

Morgan Farm, also known as Nathan Morgan Home Place, is a historic rural farmstead near Smithville in Sumter County, Georgia, U.S.. It was founded by Nathan Morgan, an African-American farmer, and represents the rare ascendence from slavery to property ownership. It has been named a Centennial Farm by the state of Georgia in 1995; and it was listed by the National Register of Historic Places, since February 26, 1998, for its contribution to African American heritage and agriculture.

== History ==
The Morgan Farm was founded in 1886 by African-American Nathan Morgan (1849–1917), with the main farmhouse built a few years later in c. 1890. Formerly enslaved, Morgan purchased 202 acres (82 ha) in 1886, where he farmed and raised his own family of nine children.

The property consists of historic farmhouse, with a central hall and a room on each side; six historic outbuildings; cultivated land; pastures; a well; a non-historic ranch house; a shed; and a carport. The late-19th century Southern United States vernacular architecture-style can be seen on the property in the smokehouse, cotton barn, hog pen, mule barn, corn crib, and the hen house.

In 1998, the property was still owned by the Morgan family.

== See also ==
- National Register of Historic Places listings in Sumter County, Georgia
- Koinonia Partners, nearby Christian farming community
