= Secondary School Study =

The Secondary School Study was an exploratory analysis of progressive education techniques and curricula in various schools throughout the southern region of the United States. Sponsored by the Association of Colleges and Secondary Schools for Negroes (ACSSN) and funded by the General Education Board (GEB), the study began in the year 1940 under the direction of William A. Robinson and officially ended in 1946. As the supervisor of North Carolina's black secondary schools, Robinson presented information on progressive education in regard to the black community at the 1937 ACSSN conference. This specific presentation titled, “Progressive Education and the Negro” was a catalyst for progressive techniques that laid the foundation for this study.

The purpose of the Secondary School Study was to further explore new and innovative high school curricula in a way that fit the black youth of this time, especially those not considering post-secondary education. Similar to the Eight-Year Study which was a precursor to the Secondary School Study, it questions what was necessary to increase the curriculum for black schools. Historically, progressive African American education had remained relatively stagnant. Without a clear direction of how progressive education would manifest itself within the school system, progressive African American educators began cultivating practices they found most crucial to the success of students in this time period. Some of these important aspects include cooperation and experimentation to adapt previous curricula to best fit their ideas of progressive education. For the experiment, seventeen schools titled “member schools” (which are the sites where the experiments were conducted) were chosen from America's Southeast to conduct this experiment in which they attempted to reconstruct their curriculum and teaching programs.

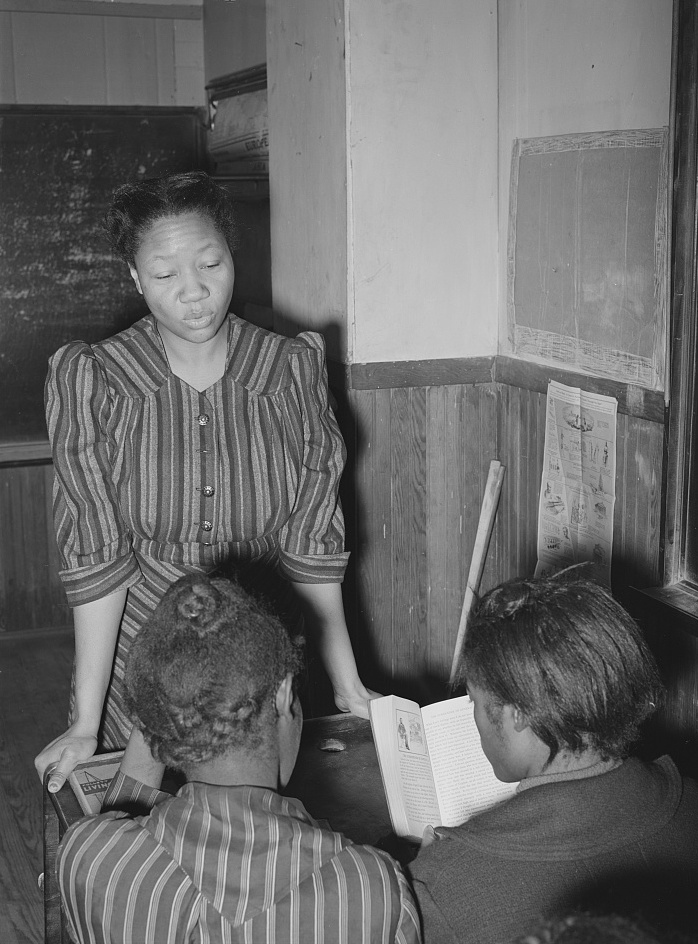
Schoolchildren reading with a teacher in 1940

== Design ==
The parameter under which the Secondary School Study was conducted involved seventeen chosen high schools within the span of a decade. Within this period, each of these member schools began implementing their ideas of what progressive education would look like. The study did not provide a set of standards by which progressive education would be controlled or taught, just that it was a shift from traditional curricula to a more integrated mode of teaching. Thus, progressive education was more of a fluid term and specific teachers took their own liberties and ideologies to interpret what that looked like in their particular classroom. This progressive educational pursuit was implemented through programs both curricular and extracurricular based, as well as various other activities. Through these lessons and activities, African American educators were able to also create an environment for students to learn about social justice as well as social activism.

== Effect ==
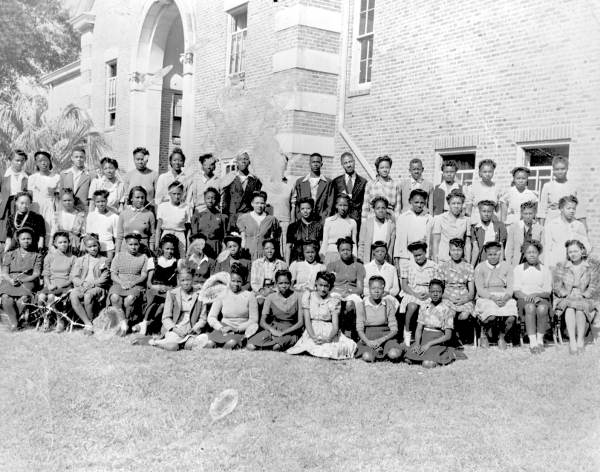
Students of Lincoln High School in Tallahassee, Florida

Contradictory to the predecessor of the Eight-Year Study, the Secondary School Study did not conduct follow-up research. The study concluded in 1946, and experimental work in interpretations of progressive education continued in various locations in the Southeast as well as throughout the country. This study concludes that the importance comes from the work of the teachers, the black progressive educators involved in the development of a new form of education received by the students during this period in the Jim Crow era. There was no set definition of what progressive education would appear to look like, so the different interpretations from black educators allowed evolving ideas to fit their student's needs.
