= Edwin Chalmers Silsby =

American missionary

Edwin Chalmers Silsby (1851-1922) was an American teacher, principal, public official, professor and dean in the United States. He spent much of his career at Talladega College in Talladega, Alabama. He served as president of the Association of Colleges for Negro Youth.

He was born in Bangkok in Siam to missionaries with the American Missionary Association. The family returned to the United States and settled in Wisconsin where his father taught. His father served as an officer during the American Civil War and settled in Alabama working for the Freedmen's Bureau establishing schools for African Americans.

Edwin Silsby served as principal of Burrell Academy in Selma, Alabama from 1875 to 1885, succeeding his father. In 1877, he married Nettie Brewster of Ohio. They had four children. They moved from Selma to Talladega where he worked at Talladega College including as its treasurer.

He received honorary degrees from Talladega College and Howard University. Silsby Science Hall at Talladega College built in 1926 is named for him.
