= George Foster Pierce =

American bishop (1811–1884)

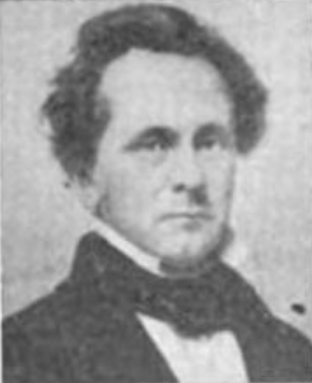
- Born: 3 February 1811; Greene County, Georgia
- Died: 3 September 1884 (aged 73); Sparta, Georgia
- Education: Franklin College
- Occupations: Clergyman, educator

George Foster Pierce (1811–1884) was an American bishop of the Methodist Episcopal Church, South who served as the first president of Wesleyan College (then known as Georgia Female College) and was also president of Emory University (then known as Emory College).

== Birth and family ==
Pierce was the son of the Rev. Lovick Pierce, a pastor and a chaplain in the War of 1812. Lovick and his wife Ann were living at the home of Ann's father, Colonel George Foster, in Greene County, Georgia, when George Foster Pierce was born on Feb. 3, 1811.

Rev. Lovick Pierce was the brother of Rev. Reddick Pierce. Both brothers were well known within the southern Methodist circuit; though, Lovick and his son George were perhaps the more famous. The elder brother Reddick had a daughter, Sarah, who in turn (after marrying an Alexander McKinnon) had a son, which she name Robert George Pierce McKinnon. Robert George Pierce McKinnon, named after his mother's cousin, in turn was a Methodist minister (and subsequently, baptist, as employment demands dictated); though, his fame was localized within the area of Eastman, Georgia.

== Education and career ==
Pierce first studied law, but was converted to the Christian faith at the age of sixteen in a revival at Franklin College in Athens, Georgia (the founding college of the University of Georgia), from which he later graduated. While at Franklin College, he was a member of the Phi Kappa Literary Society. He joined the Traveling Ministry of the Georgia Annual Regional Conference of the Methodist Episcopal Church in 1831, the only college graduate at the time. He was ordained by Bishop James Osgood Andrew. Pierce served as a pastor and a presiding elder in the Church.

After eight years he was elected President of the Georgia Female College in Macon (now Wesleyan College), the first four-year college in the world chartered to offer undergraduate education exclusively to women. Pierce was Wesleyan's first president, serving there from 1836-1840. In 1848 he became the President of Emory College (later, University), its first President to have been educated in Georgia. Both schools were founded by the Methodist Episcopal Church. Pierce served as president of Emory until his election as a Bishop in 1854.

Pierce was a delegate to the historic General Conference of 1844 which met in New York City. He tried in vain to be a moderating influence in the debate that erupted over slavery. In the end, the next year in Louisville he reluctantly helped to organize the Methodist Episcopal Church, South which resulted from the schism of 1844. He was likewise initially resistant to Georgia's secession prior to the Civil War, but later supported the Confederacy and maintained friendships with Robert Toombs and Alexander Stephens. He advocated for the repeal of Georgia's slave laws in 1863.

However, scholarly works such as "The Southern Methodist Church and the Proslavery Argument", published in The Journal of Southern History, vol 32, No. 3. (August 1966), pp. 325–41. note that Pierce's reforms were mild. In 1863 Pierce delivered a speech before the Georgia Legislature in which he argued for slavery and supported the secession of states and the Confederate cause, stating "The triumph of our arms is the triumph of right and truth and justice. The defeat of our enemies is the defeat of wrong and malice and outrage. Our Confederacy has committed herself to no iniquitous policy, no unholy alliances, no unwarrantable plans..."

Pierce was widely popular throughout the Methodist Episcopal Church, South. After resigning Emory's presidency to become Bishop, he maintained a close affiliation with the college, serving in later years as a trustee and helping to raise capital funds for the school.

== Death and legacy ==
Pierce died on Sept. 3, 1884, at Sunshine Plantation, his home near Sparta, Georgia, where he was buried.

Wesleyan College has named two chapels in his honor. The original Pierce Chapel was an integral part of daily life at Wesleyan's former downtown Macon campus before the college was destroyed in a 1963 fire. In 2015, Wesleyan dedicated a new Pierce Chapel at its present suburban campus.

Pierce Avenue, a major road in Macon and part of Georgia State Route 247, is also named for George Foster Pierce.

== Selected writings ==
- "Oration on Anniversary of the American Bible Society", 1844. This General Conference address exists today in part only in Sermons and Addresses.
- Sermon in The Southern Methodist Pulpit, C.F. Deems, Editor, 1849–1852.
- Incidents of Western Travel, 1854.
- Sermon: "Devotedness to Christ", preached in memory of Bishop Capers, 1857; also in Smithson, W.T., Methodist Pulpit, South, 1859.
- "Wesley As An Itinerant", Wesley Memorial Volume, J.O.A. Clark, Editor, 1880.
- Sermon: "The World in the Church", Sermons by Southern Methodist Preachers, T.O. Summers, Editor, 1881.
- Sermons and Addresses A.G. Haygood, Editor, 1886.
- Sketch of Lovick Pierce, in Life and Times of George F. Pierce, G.G. Smith, 1888.
- Proceedings of the Bible Convention of the Confederate States of America, Including the Minutes of the Organization of the Bible Society, Augusta, Ga., March 19–21, 1862; and Also a Sermon Preached Before the Convention by the Rev. George F. Pierce, D. D., Bishop of the M. E. Church, South.
- The word of God a nation's life : a sermon, preached before the Bible Convention of the Confederate States, Augusta, Georgia, March 19th, 1862.

== Biographies ==
- Smith, G.G., Life and Times of George F. Pierce, 1888.
- Fitzgerald, O.P., Eminent Methodists, 1897.
- Family Reminiscences, Julia Pierce, granddaughter (hand-written), 1947, in the Methodist Bishops' Collection Library of Perkins School of Theology, Southern Methodist University.

== See also ==
- List of bishops of the United Methodist Church

== Sources ==
- Leete, Frederick DeLand, Methodist Bishops. Nashville, The Methodist Publishing House, 1948.
- Purifoy, Lewis. "The Southern Methodist Church and the Proslavery Argument", published in The Journal of Southern History, Vol. 32, No. 3. (August 1966), pp. 325–341.
