= Louis H. Persley =

American architect (c.1888–1932)

Louis Hudson Persley
- Born: c. 1888; Georgia, U.S.
- Died: July 13, 1932; Macon, Georgia, U.S.
- Burial place: Linwood Cemetery
- Other names: Louis Hudison Persley, Lewis Persley, Louis Pursley, Leo Persley
- Education: Lincoln University
- Alma mater: Carnegie Institute of Technology
- Occupations: Architect, teacher
- Years active: 1916–1932

Louis Hudson Persley (c.1888–1932), was an American architect. Persley became the first African American to register with the new Georgia State Board of Registered Architects on April 5, 1920. He was part of what was possibly the nation’s first black architecture firm, Taylor and Persley, a partnership founded in July 1920 with Robert Robinson Taylor. He had several spellings of his name including Louis Hudison Persley, Lewis H. Persley, and Louis Pursley.

== Biography ==
Louis Persley was born and raised in Macon, Georgia, to Black parents Maxine and Thomas K. Persley. He attended Lincoln University, and graduated from Carnegie Institute of Technology (now Carnegie Mellon University) in 1914. He was a professor of architectural and mechanical drawing from 1915 until 1916 at Tuskegee Institute in Tuskegee, Alabama.

In July 1920, Persely and fellow architect Robert Robinson Taylor had formed a black architecture firm together, Taylor and Persley. This was possibly the first black architecture firm in the United States. They collaborated on many designs, including of several buildings on Tuskegee Institute (now Tuskegee University) campus.

He died on July 13, 1932, at the age of 42, of kidney failure, and he is buried at Linwood Cemetery in the Pleasant Hill neighborhood of Macon, Georgia. A historical marker commemorates him in front of the First AME Church in Athens, Georgia. Persley's profile was included in the biographical dictionary African American Architects: A Biographical Dictionary, 1865–1945 (2004).

== Buildings ==
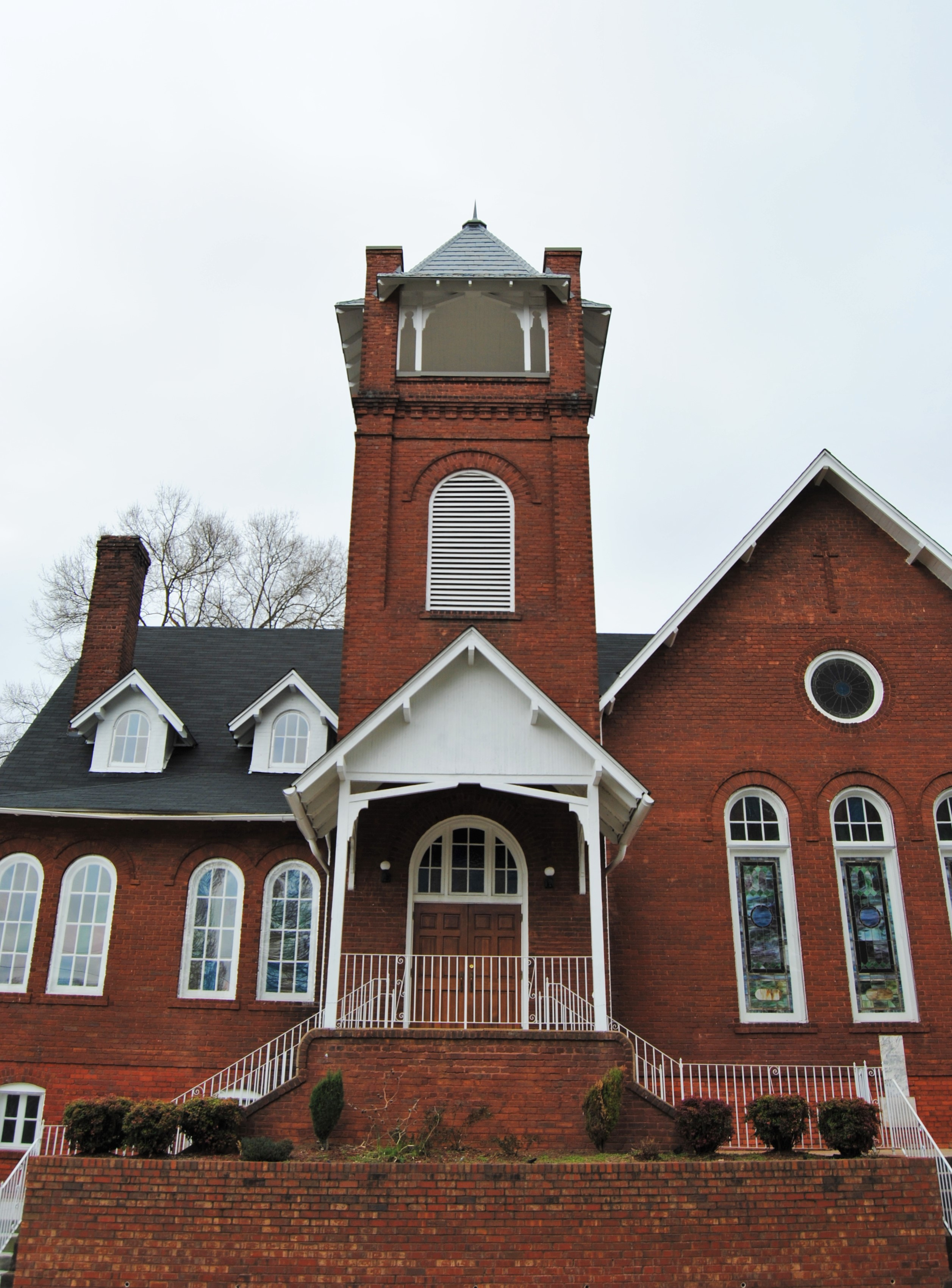
First African Methodist Episcopal Church

- First African Methodist Episcopal Church (1916) in Athens, Georgia
- Campbell Chapel A.M.E. Church (1920) in Americus, Georgia; listed on the National Register of Historic Places
- Chambliss Hotel (1922), Macon, Georgia
- Colored Masonic Temple (1922; or 'Most Worshipful Prince Hall Grand Lodge') in Birmingham, Alabama; for the Free and Accepted Masons
- Central City Funeral Home (1928), Cotton Avenue, Macon, Georgia
- Samaritan Building, Athens, Georgia (demolished)
- Dinkins Memorial Building at Selma University, Selma, Alabama; with Robert Robinson Taylor
- Masonic Temple in Birmingham, Alabama; with Robert Robinson Taylor
- Several buildings on the campus of Tuskegee Institute, Tuskegee, Alabama; with Robert Robinson Taylor
  - James Hall Dormitory (1921), Tuskegee Institute
  - Sage Hall Dormitory (1927), Tuskegee Institute
  - Logan Hall Dormitory (1931), Tuskegee Institute
  - Armstrong Science Building (1932), Tuskegee Institute
  - Hollis Burke Frissell Library (1932), Tuskegee Institute

== See also ==
- African-American architects
- McKissack and McKissack, another early Black architecture firm
