= Hank Williams Boyhood Home & Museum =

Childhood home of Hank Williams

- Exterior of the house in 2010
- Interactive map of the Hank Williams Boyhood Home & Museum area

General information
- Type: Residential home
- Location: 127 Rose St, Georgiana, Alabama, United States
- Coordinates: 31°38′22″N 86°44′31″W
- Completed: 1850

Technical details
- Floor count: 2

The Hank Williams, Sr. Boyhood Home & Museum is a historic house museum located at 127 Rose Street in Georgiana, Alabama where American musician Hank Williams, Sr. lived during his childhood from 1931 to 1934. It opened as a museum in 1993 and one of several museums dedicated to Williams in Alabama; it is famed for being the house where Williams lived when he first began to play guitar. The house is listed on the Alabama Register of Landmarks and Heritage.

== Description and history ==
=== General ===
The house was built in 1850 in the rural town of Georgiana, Alabama. The house has two stories and a raised porch which supports the house on stilts, typical of homes in the deep south from this period. The house also has a wrap-around porch and a distinctive overhanging roof that spans the length of the porch on all sides of the building. Several rocking chairs now sit on the porch, though none of them are from Williams' childhood.

=== History ===
Hiram "Hank" Williams's family moved to the town of Georgiana in 1930. Their first house was destroyed by a fire, leading to them moving to the house at 127 Rose Street in 1931 after a prominent landlord from the area offered Williams' mother the home to live in rent-free until her income became more stable. Williams, aged 7 when the family moved to the house, sold crops grown on the property by his mother for supplemental income as a child. He also shined shoes and sold peanuts in the street.

The house is notable for being where Williams lived when he received his first guitar. Though the precise circumstances of Williams acquiring the guitar are disputed, it is accepted that Williams received the guitar while living at the house. An official Alabama Historic Marker on the property reads:

When he was 8, his mother bought him a guitar for $3.50. Black street musician Rufus (Tee-Tot) Payne became his teacher. Hiram practiced guitar under the raised-cottage house and sang on the streets for tips.

The house was also a boarding house for a period. The Williams family moved from Georgiana to Montgomery, Alabama in 1934. The house was purchased by the city of Georgiana in 1992, opening as a museum the following year. Little of the original furnishings are preserved in the home's interior; the house is filled with exhibits detailing Williams' life and music career. Objects on display include several musical instruments owned by Williams, including a guitar, lap steel guitar, and piano. In 1991, the house was designated on the Alabama Register of Landmarks and Heritage.

== Thigpen's Log Cabin Popular Dance Hall ==
As a teenager living in Montgomery, Williams began promoting local concerts during appearances on WSFA. These concerts, where Williams performed with his band the Drifting Cowboys, were held at a log cabin a mile from Williams's boyhood home in Georgiana. The cabin, a popular dance hall known as Thigpen's Log Cabin Popular Dance Hall or Fred Thigpen's Log Cabin, was purchased by the city of Georgiana in 1992. A portion of the cabin, including the front entrance and part of the barn wherein the dances were held, was moved from its original location to the (then-future) site of the Hank Williams Boyhood Home & Museum in 1993, opening to the public at the same time as Williams's home.

== Hank Williams Festival ==
The city of Georgiana hosts an annual country music festival at a park on the site called the Hank Williams Festival. The event is held annually in June and has been running since 1979; it moved to its current location at the Williams property after the property was purchased by the city and opened to the public in 1993.

== See also ==
- List of residences of American musicians
