= Charlie Parker Residence =

House in Manhattan, New York

- U.S. National Register of Historic Places
- New York State Register of Historic Places
- New York City Landmark
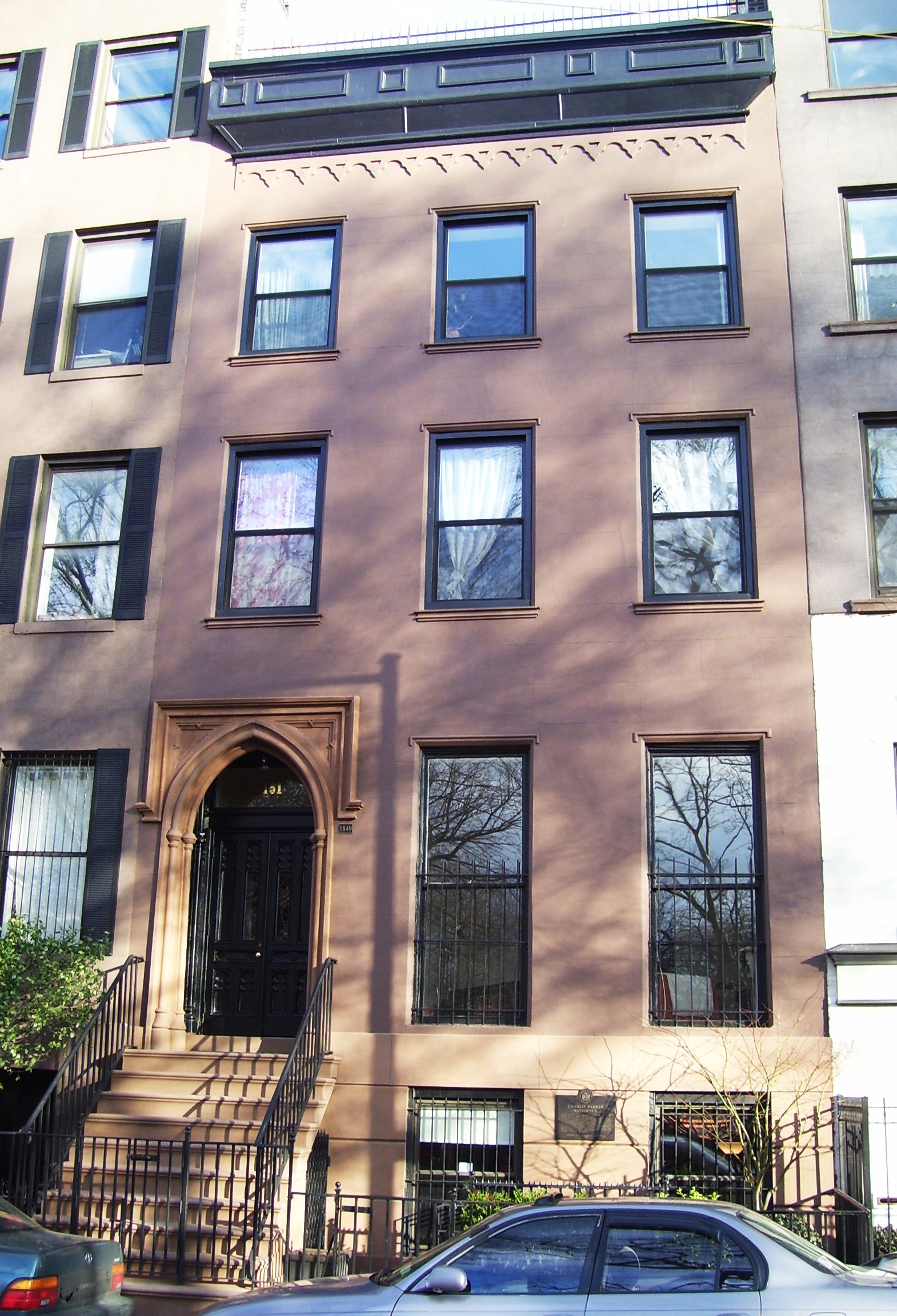
- 151 Avenue B in 2011

- Location within Manhattan Location within New York City Location within New York Location within the United States
- Location: 151 Avenue B Manhattan, New York, US
- Coordinates: 40°43′36″N 73°58′48″W
- Built: circa 1849
- Architectural style: Gothic Revival
- NRHP reference No.: 94000262
- NYSRHP No.: 06101.007022
- NYCL No.: 2032

Significant dates
- Added to NRHP: April 7, 1994
- Designated NYSRHP: January 25, 1994
- Designated NYCL: May 18, 1999

The Charlie Parker Residence is a Gothic Revival-style rowhouse at 151 Avenue B in the East Village of Manhattan in New York City, New York, US. The house is notable as the onetime residence of jazz musician Charlie Parker, who lived in the basement with his wife Chan Richardson from 1950 to 1954. Based on the house's association with Parker, the house is listed on the National Register of Historic Places and is a New York City designated landmark, and Avenue B between 9th and 10th Streets is co-named "Charlie Parker Place".

The building was built around 1849 as a single-family house before being split into two apartments in 1880. A third apartment and a penthouse level were added in the 1940s. The house consists of three stories above a raised basement and is three bays wide, with a brownstone facade. A stoop is placed asymmetrically on the facade, and another entrance leads to the basement. Inside, the house retains details such as decorative plasterwork, wall pilasters, moldings, and a fireplace.

== Description ==
The Charlie Parker Residence is located at 151 Avenue B in the East Village of Manhattan, New York City. It is on the east side of the street, directly opposite Tompkins Square Park. The house is listed on the National Register of Historic Places and is designated by the New York City Landmarks Preservation Commission (LPC) as the onetime residence of Charles "Bird" Parker Jr. (1920–1955), an American jazz musician from Kansas City, Kansas. Parker, who moved to New York City in 1938 or 1939, was a highly influential figure in the development of bebop, a subgenre of jazz.

The house is built in the Gothic Revival style. It is part of a group of three mid-19th-century brick and brownstone rowhouses at 149–153 Avenue B, along Tompkins Square Park's eastern boundary. 151 Avenue B is the most substantially intact of these houses. A 1999 LPC report was unable to ascertain the identity of the house's architect but wrote that the house's Gothic Revival decorations may have been inspired by the nearby St. Brigid Roman Catholic Church. It is one of a relatively small number of remaining Gothic Revival houses in New York City, as that style fell out of favor in the late 19th century, when the introduction of more stringent fire codes led to growing adoption of other styles such as the Federal, Greek Revival, and Italianate.

=== Exterior ===
The Charlie Parker Residence consists of three stories above a raised basement and is three bays wide. This was a commonplace massing for New York City rowhouses of the time. The facade is made of brownstone and is painted. The basement has two at-grade windows shielded by grilles, in addition to a landmark plaque. The raised first floor is accessed by a stoop, the only one remaining on the block. The stoop has handrails, and there is an entrance to the basement beneath the stoop. There is also an iron fence running along the sidewalk, which is interrupted by the stoop.

At the first floor, the stoop leads to a carved Gothic Revival pointed arch doorway with paired colonettes on either side and a hood molding above. The wood-paneled doors have either trefoil or quatrefoil motifs. The year 1849 and the address number 151 are placed on plaques next to the entrance. There is a pair of one-over-one sash windows on the first floor to the south (right) of the entrance. The second and third stories have one-over-one sash windows, similar in width to those on the first floor, albeit shorter. These are also topped by Gothic hood moldings. The facade is topped by a painted box cornice with decorative moldings, described as Gothic Revival in style. A penthouse is recessed from the roofline and is hidden from view of the street.

=== Interior ===
The interior was originally used by one family, but in the 20th century was subdivided into one apartment per floor. As built, the first floor has an entrance foyer with ornamental moldings, Next to it is a curved stairway with a carved wood balustrade, railing, wainscoting, and arched wall niches. There are parlors in the front and back, connected by a hallway on one side of the house. These rooms retain details such as decorative plasterwork, wall pilasters, moldings, and a fireplace in the dining room.

Parker's basement apartment has four rooms arranged from front to rear, along with a bathroom and a kitchen, all accessed by a hallway running on one side of the house. The layout has been slightly altered since Parker's occupancy; for example, the main room has been subdivided to create an alcove with closets. When Parker's family lived there, the rear room was used as a bedroom facing a backyard. In addition, the Parkers had decorated their apartment with wallpaper from the Steinberg Company, along with blond furniture.

== History ==
The house at 151 Avenue B was constructed c. 1849 and was initially a single-family house. The house was divided into two apartments after 1880, when David Toal acquired it. It became the Bryson Day Nursery in 1906 and then was sold to Joseph Raskob in 1945. During Raskob's ownership, the house was split into three units, and a penthouse was added over the original third floor.

=== Parker occupancy ===
Around 1950, the musician Charlie "Bird" Parker and his wife Chan Richardson moved into the ground-floor apartment at 151 Avenue B. Parker later told biographer George Reisner that he had selected the neighborhood because of its lack of "hype"; at the time, real estate in the neighborhood was inexpensive partly because of high crime rates and the presence of abandoned buildings. Parker and Richardson lived there for four years, during which two of their children were born: their daughter Pree and their son Baird. Parker's relocation into 151 Avenue B came just as he was starting to record music as an independent artist. During his occupancy of the house, Parker frequently performed internationally and in jazz clubs in Upper Manhattan.

Parker's cab driver Ralph Douglas recalled that the apartment was "decked out very nice", despite the shabbiness of the neighborhood. Parker's bandmates, including Joe Albany and Al Cohn, sometimes came by to visit. Christodora House bought the house in 1952, while Parker was living there. Parker had wanted to raise his family at 151 Avenue B, but his alcoholism and the death of three-year-old Pree in 1954 caused him to become despondent. In October 1954, he and Chan moved to New Hope, Pennsylvania. 151 Avenue B was Parker's last permanent New York City residence, as the musician died less than a year later. Parker's brief residency at 151 Avenue B subsequently prompted the New York City government to rename Avenue B between 9th and 10th Streets after him in either 1992 or 1993, as well as concerts of Parker's music in nearby Tompkins Square Park.

=== Subsequent owners ===
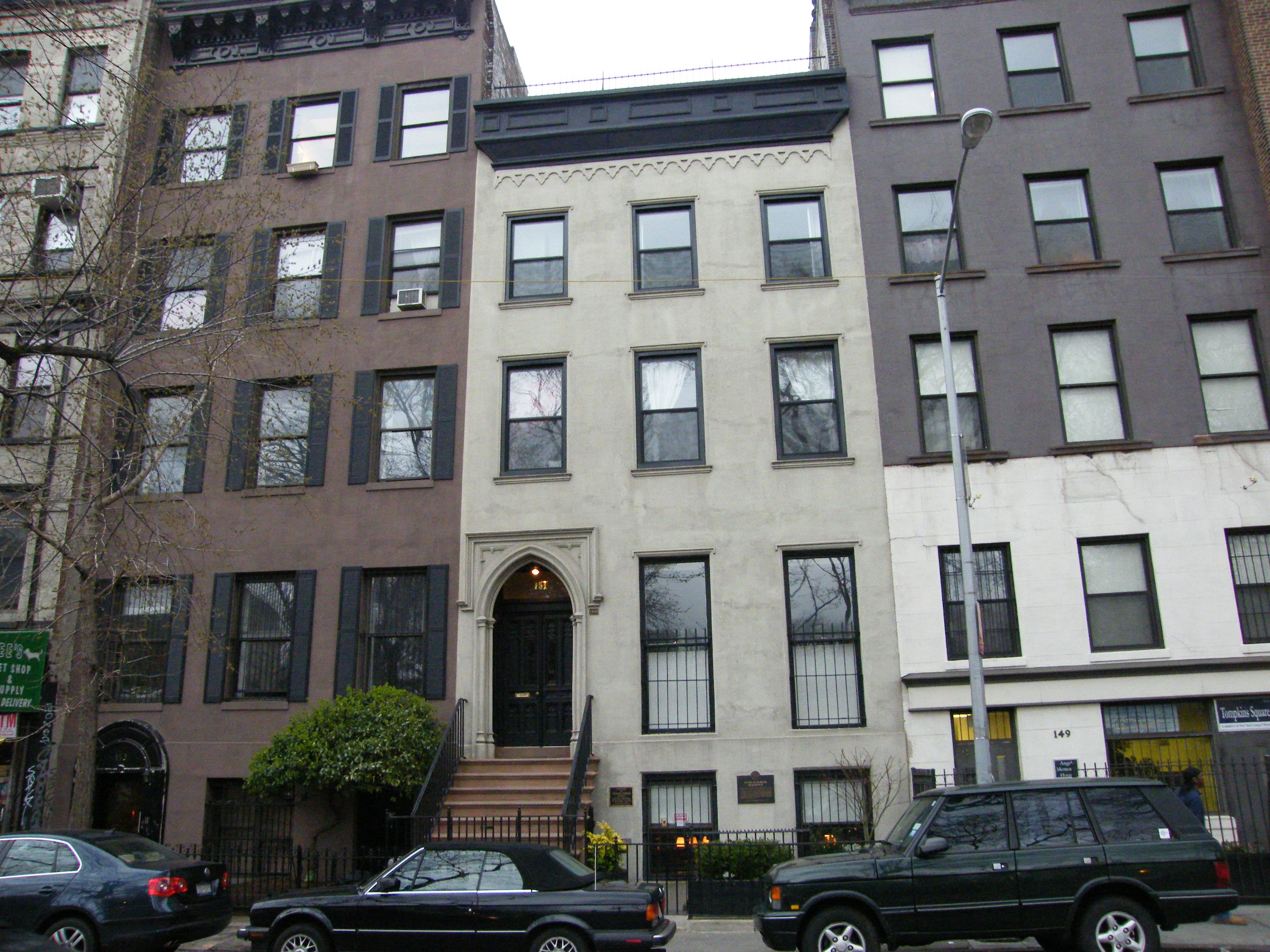
151 Avenue B and the rowhouses on either side

The painter Franz Kline occupied the third floor for three months in 1955. Kline's biographer Fielding Dawson wrote that he had perceived the apartment as too small and more suited for a writer. Christadora House sold the property in 1958. The sculptor Peter Agostini also lived in the building from 1962 to 1966, living on one of the upper floors. 151 Avenue B was acquired in 1979 by Judith Rhodes, a jazz-concert producer, who paid $90,000. Rhodes, who had chosen the property based on its associations with Parker, agreed to buy it after a real estate broker showed her Parker's "practice closet". Rhodes rented out the second story, third story, and penthouse, and she and her children lived on the basement and first floor.

The house was renovated in the 1990s. The New York City Landmarks Preservation Commission (LPC) originally considered designating the house as a city landmark in 1990, but the LPC did not grant the designation at the time, despite noting that the house had "some historical and architectural interest". 151 Avenue B was added to the National Register of Historic Places in 1994. Following efforts from Rhodes to obtain city landmark designation, the LPC designated the Charlie Parker Residence as a landmark in 1999. Preservationists and local residents supported the city designation both for its architectural merits and for the house's association with Parker. One supporter of designation attached a bird feather to a letter to the LPC, which said, "Bird lives and flies forever. Please preserve his cage." At the time, 151 Avenue B was one of a few city landmarks designated mainly for their cultural significance, along with other sites such as the Louis Armstrong House in Queens; a LPC spokesperson said the agency had never designated any landmarks solely on cultural grounds and that 151 Avenue B had some architectural merit.

In the 2000s, Rhodes continued to occupy the house, which still had Parker's original wallpaper and cast iron bathtub, along with Rhodes's African art and jazz-themed photographs. Rhodes took care of birds there, and she recalled that Parker's fans sometimes came by to visit, including one fan who got to his knees crying and kissing the floor. The building was placed for sale in 2015 for $9.25 million, but it was not sold at that time. Parker's apartment was being rented out at $5,700 a month by 2019. After Rhodes's death in early 2025, her children again placed the building for sale later that year.

== See also ==
- National Register of Historic Places listings in Manhattan below 14th Street
- List of New York City Designated Landmarks in Manhattan below 14th Street

== Sources ==
- Postal, Matthew (1999). Charlie Parker Residence (PDF) (Report). New York City Landmarks Preservation Commission.
- Reisner, Robert George (1977). Bird: the legend of Charlie Parker. Da Capo Press. ISBN 978-0-306-80069-6.
- Shaver, Peter D. (1994). National Register of Historic Places Inventory/Nomination: Charlie Parker Residence (PDF) (Report). National Park Service.
