= Chan Woods =

Jazz enthusiast (1925–1999)

- Born: Beverly Delores Berg; 29 June 1925; New York City, New York, U.S.
- Died: 9 September 1999 (aged 74); Étampes, France
- Spouse(s): Charlie Parker; Phil Woods
- Children: 5

Chan Woods (born Beverly Delores Berg, also known as Chan Richardson and Chan Parker; 29 June 1925 – 9 September 1999) was a common-law wife of jazz musician Charlie Parker. She later married musician Phil Woods.

== Biography ==
She was born in New York City to an inter-religious couple; her father, a producer of vaudeville shows, was Jewish, while her mother, a dancer in Florenz Ziegfeld's Midnight Frolic, was not. Adopting the name "Chan Richardson", Chan became a nightclub dancer. An early jazz enthusiast, she was romantically connected in the 1940s and early 1950s with jazz musicians Johnny Bothwell and later Don Lanphere.

Chan met Charlie Parker in the 1940s, but their friendship was not romantic until around 1950. Chan and Charlie lived together in a common-law relationship at 151 Avenue B, in New York's East Village for the last five years of Charlie's life, from 1950 to 1955. However, Charlie had not formally terminated a prior marriage. Chan already had one child, her daughter Kim, at the time they established their household; together, Chan and Charlie had two more children, Baird and Pree. Although they never legally wed, Chan took Charlie's surname, as did all the children. Their relationship was dealt a severe blow with the 1954 death of their daughter Pree at the age of two-and-a-half from pneumonia related to a congenital heart defect.

== Later years and death ==
Charlie Parker died just a year and a week after their daughter, in 1955, not long before he would have turned 35.

Two years after Parker's death, Chan married saxophonist Phil Woods and moved to France, where she spent much of the rest of her life. She had another daughter from this marriage, Aimée Francesca Woods (1961–1993). In 1981, Chan helped write and edit a book of photographs of Charlie Parker titled To Bird with Love and later wrote the autobiographical memoir My Life in E-Flat. The second book was published in 1999, the year of her death from cancer, aged 74, in Étampes, France.

Just before her death, Chan was interviewed by Ken Burns, and she is seen posthumously in Episode 8 of Burns' 2001 documentary Jazz.

Chan Parker was the mother of jazz vocalist Kim Parker (b. 1947). Chan and Charlie's son Baird lived until 2014.
