= Muckaloochee Creek =

Stream in Georgia, U.S.

Coordinates: 31°48′17.61″N 84°9′37.67″W

Muckaloochee Creek is a stream in the U.S. state of Georgia. It is a tributary to Muckalee Creek.

A variant name is "Muckatoochee Creek".
