= Association of Colleges and Secondary Schools for Negroes =

Defunct accreditation association

The Association of Colleges and Secondary Schools for Negroes (ACSSN) was an organization for colleges and schools in the United States serving African American students. It was established in 1934 in Atlanta, Georgia and worked to improve schools for African Americans in Southern states. The region's Southern Association of Colleges and Schools (SACS) accrediting body barred schools for African Americans. ACSSN was preceded by the Association of Colleges for Negro Youth. It sponsored the Secondary School Study that was funded by the General Education Board.

== History ==
ACNY was founded at Knoxville College in 1913. In 1916 the fourth annual meeting was held at Knoxville College. Edwin Chalmers Silsby was the group's president. Physical education, measures to control drinking smoking, and card playing, and religious education were among the subjects addressed. Compulsory attendance at special religious events was supported. Textbook recommendations were made and a committee on membership and accreditation established. The eighth annual meeting in 1921 was held at Fisk University in Nashville, Tennessee. In February 1926 it held a meeting at Bishop College and Wiley University in Marshall, Texas.

The Southern Association of Colleges and Schools established a committee to inspect "Negro" schools in 1930. It published a list of approved schools for "Negro Youth" in 1934. In 1934 ACNY was reorganized and renamed.

The group arranged the Secondary School Study for Negroes was conducted was conducted from 1940 to 1947 at sixteen high schools in 11 states.

In 1948 ACSSN established a committee pursuing membership on the Southern Association of Colleges and Schools. In 1957 schools for African Americans began to be accepted. After passage of the Civil Rights Act of 1964 and school integration and integration of the accrediting body for schools in the South it disbanded.

Bias in accreditation decisions regarding HBCUs by the integrated organization and negative funding implications have been reported.

Leland Stanford Cozart, president emeritus of Barber-Scotia College, wrote A History Of The Association Of Colleges And Secondary Schools 1934-1965. It was published in 1967. Rufus E. Clement wrote the Foreword.

== Membership ==
Delegates at the 1916 annual conference came from Atlanta University, Howard University, Knoxville College, Morehouse College, Shaw University, Talladega College, Virginia Union University, Wilberforce University, Virginia Union University, and Fisk University.

Member schools included William Grant High School.

== See also ==
- Southern Association of Colleges and Schools
