= Americus Institute =

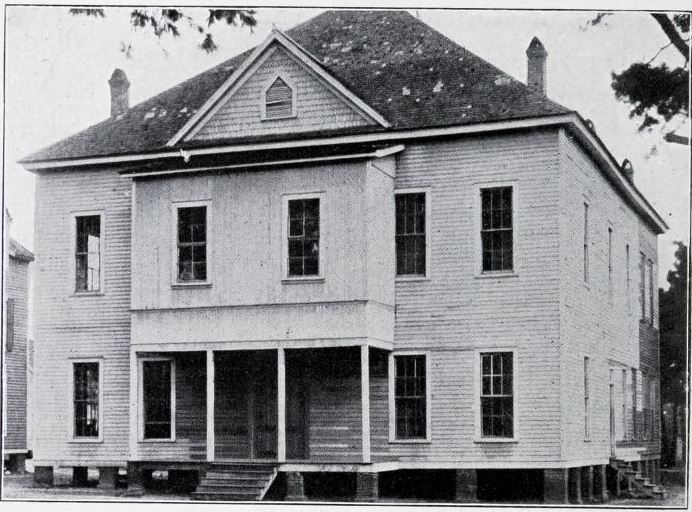
- Main building for the school, c. 1910
- Americus, Sumter County, Georgia; United States

Information
- School type: Secondary school
- Opened: October 2, 1897
- Closed: 1932
- Gender: Coeducational
- Language: English

Americus Institute was a secondary school in Americus, Georgia, United States during the late 1800s and early 1900s. The school was established in 1897 by the Southwestern Georgia Baptist Association in order to educate African American youth in the area. By the 1920s, the school was enrolling about 200 students annually and was considered one of the premier secondary schools for African Americans in the state. The school closed in 1932.

== Establishment and early years ==
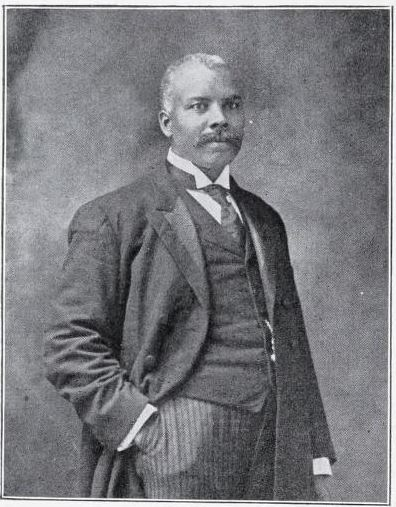
Major W. Reddick served as the first principal for the school

The idea for a secondary school in Americus, Georgia designed to educate the African American youth of the area began in 1878 amongst the members of the Southwestern Colored Baptist Association. (Note: Also referred to as the "Southwestern Georgia Baptist Association".) Americus was located in Georgia's Black Belt, with about 1 million African Americans living within 100 miles (160 km) of the city. Despite the large population, the area lacked adequate educational facilities for African Americans. Within a few years, the organization had raised roughly $1,300 in cash and had acquired about 17 acres (6.9 ha) of land to serve as the school's campus. However, by the 1890s, the money raised for the school had been mishandled and the size of the campus had shrunk significantly. (Note: Sources vary on the size of the school at this time, with one source stating a size of roughly 3 acres (1.2 ha) and another stating a size of less than 2 acres (0.81 ha).) Additionally, the initial enthusiasm for the school had subsided within the group. Despite this, the school, known as Americus Institute, was officially founded in 1897. According to an article in the Southern Workman, the school's founders had three goals for the school:

1. To provide a thorough high-school education for Negro youth.
2. To develop a spirit of self-support in Negro education.
3. To stimulate friendly relationship between the races.

Major W. Reddick, a graduate from Atlanta Baptist College's first graduating class, served as the initial principal, with a total faculty of two. (Note: This included both Reddick and an assistant of his.) The school held its first class on October 2, 1897, with nine students in a small two-room cottage. In its first year of existence, the owners of the school donated roughly $400 for the school's maintenance.

In the years following its establishment, the school grew steadily. The two-room cottage was expanded with additional rooms and a second floor, and a dining hall and dormitories for boys and girls were also built on the campus. By 1907, the faculty had grown to eight, of whom seven had had professional training in education and six had graduated from Spelman Seminary. Additionally, the number of students had increased to 175 students from Southwest Georgia and Florida. That same year, on April 11, one of the dormitories was destroyed in a fire, with Reddick requesting $10,000 in donations to help improve the school. By 1908, the school had 193 students, and in May of that year, noted African American leader Booker T. Washington spoke at the school. By 1909, the school was one of 26 that received financial support from the American Baptist Home Mission Society. The school's annual expenses at this time were about $8,500, while the value of the school's property was about $21,000. In a report from Atlanta Baptist College President George Sale, he spoke highly of the school during this time, stating, "No institution I know of bids so fair to become a great academy for Negro pupils as Americus".

== Office of Education report ==
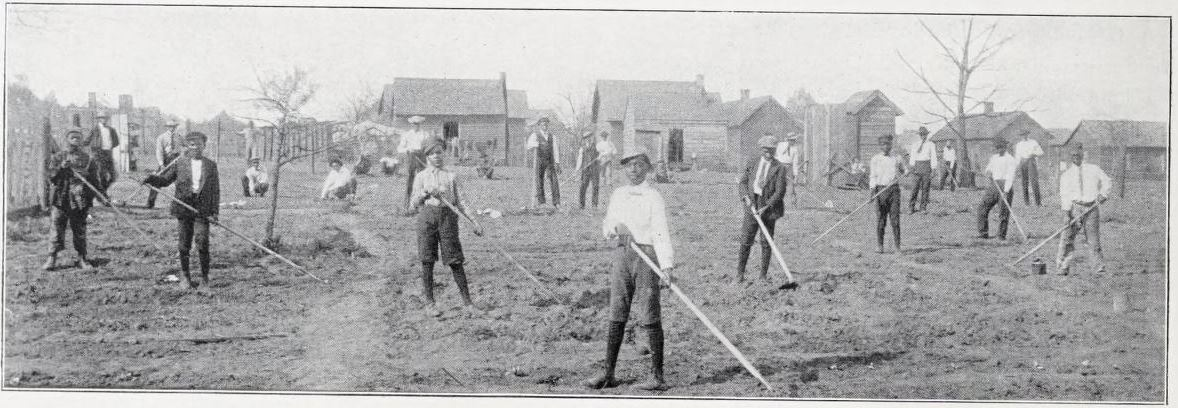
Students at the school, c. 1910

In 1917, the school was covered in a report published by the United States Office of Education, which had visited the school in both November 1913 and February 1916. In their report, the office stated that the school "serves as a central institution in which pupils may supplement the training received in the rural schools". Additionally, they noted that the school's "good management is seriously handicapped by lack of funds". The school at this time had 14 teachers and 98 students, though the enrollment for the entire year was 200. As part of the office's conclusions for the school, they recommended that more emphasis be placed on industrial education and that the school needed additional financial support.

== Later years ==
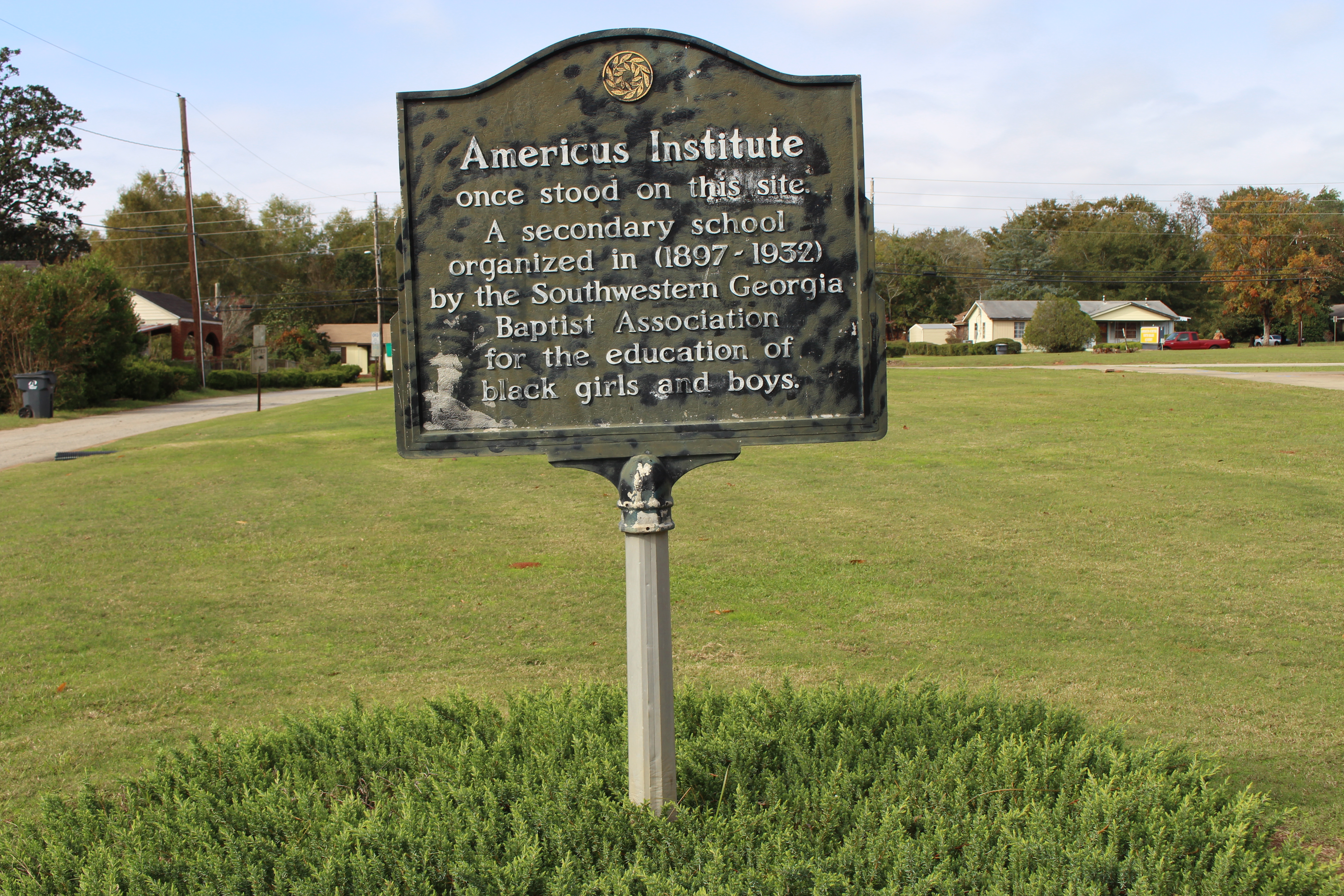
Historical marker for Americus Institute

By 1921, the school, with an enrollment of 229 students, was receiving funding from the General Education Board. Additional funding from this time came from the school's 153 acres (62 ha) farm, which generated a net profit of $1,387 in 1922. While the school continued to promote a curriculum of practice over theory, many students from Americus matriculated to some of the best historically black colleges and universities in the country. By 1929, the school became one of five secondary schools to become affiliated with Morehouse College (the new name of Atlanta Baptist College). The school filed for bankruptcy in 1930 and permanently closed in 1932. The city purchased the property in 1934 to build a new African American high school, A. S. Staley High School.

A historical marker now stands on the former grounds of the school. In February 2020, as part of Black History Month celebrations, the Americus Welcome Center held a tour of the city that highlighted locations of importance to the city's African American history, with Americus Institute being included on the tour.

== See also ==
- List of Baptist schools in the United States

== Sources ==
- Anderson, Alan (November 21, 2016) [July 18, 2003]. "Americus". New Georgia Encyclopedia. Archived from the original on February 26, 2022.
- "New Negro School". The Atlanta Constitution. December 3, 1934. p. 12 – via Newspapers.com.
- Brackney, William H. (2008). Congregation and Campus: Baptists in Higher Education. Macon, Georgia: Mercer University Press. ISBN 978-0-88146-130-5.
- "State News Summary". Butler Herald. Butler, Georgia. December 11, 1930. p. 22.
- Hartshorn, W. N.; Penniman, George W., eds. (1910). An Era of Progress and Promise, 1863–1910: The Religious, Moral, and Educational Development of the American Negro since his Emancipation. Boston: The Priscilla Publishing Company.
- Jones, Alex (February 17, 2020). "Black History Trolley Tour gives you a glimpse of African-American history in Americus". WTVM. Archived from the original on March 1, 2022.
- McCarthur, Georgia (February 16, 2020). "African-American tour explores Americus' historic past". WALB. Archived from the original on February 29, 2020.
- Negro Year Book: An Annual Encyclopedia of the Negro, 1921–1922. Tuskegee, Alabama: Negro Year Book Publishing Company. 1922.
- "Americus Institute". New Georgia Encyclopedia. Image from Michael Rivera. Archived from the original on March 1, 2022.
- Sale, George (May 1907). "Americus Institute". The Baptist Home Mission Monthly. XXIX (5). American Baptist Home Mission Society: 189–192.
- "Americus Institute". Southern Workman. Hampton, Virginia: Hampton Normal and Agricultural Institute: 508–510. October 1923.
- Negro Education: A Study of the Private and Higher Schools for Colored People in the United States. Vol. II. United States Office of Education. Washington, D.C.: United States Government Printing Office. 1917.
