= Pleasant Hill Historic District (Macon, Georgia) =

Historic district in Georgia

- U.S. National Register of Historic Places
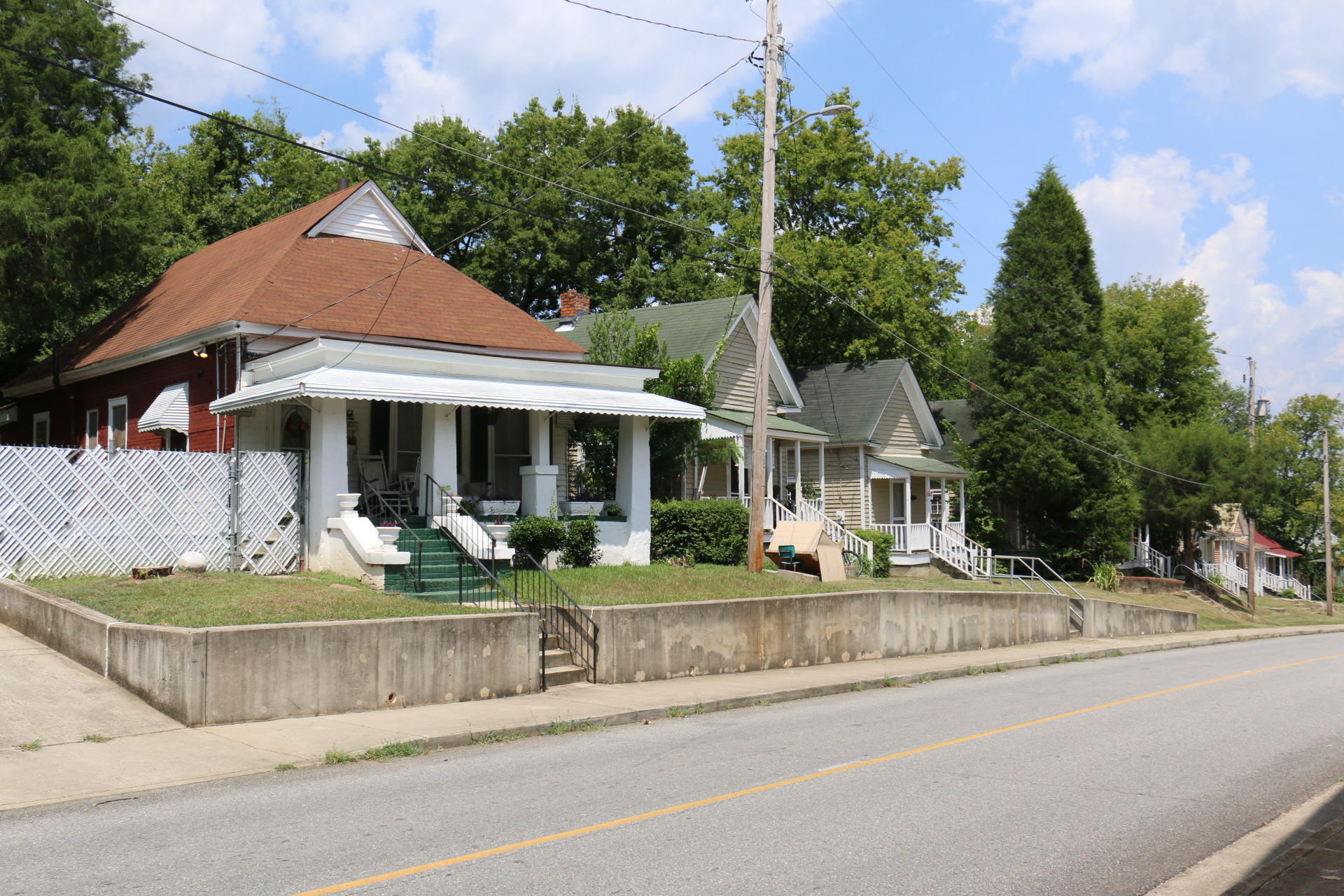
- Houses on Walnut Street
- Location: Roughly bounded by Sheridan Ave. and Schofield St., Madison, Jefferson and Ferguson, and Galliard Sts. Macon, Georgia, U.S.
- Architectural style: Mixed styles
- NRHP reference No.: 86001130
- Added to NRHP: May 22, 1996

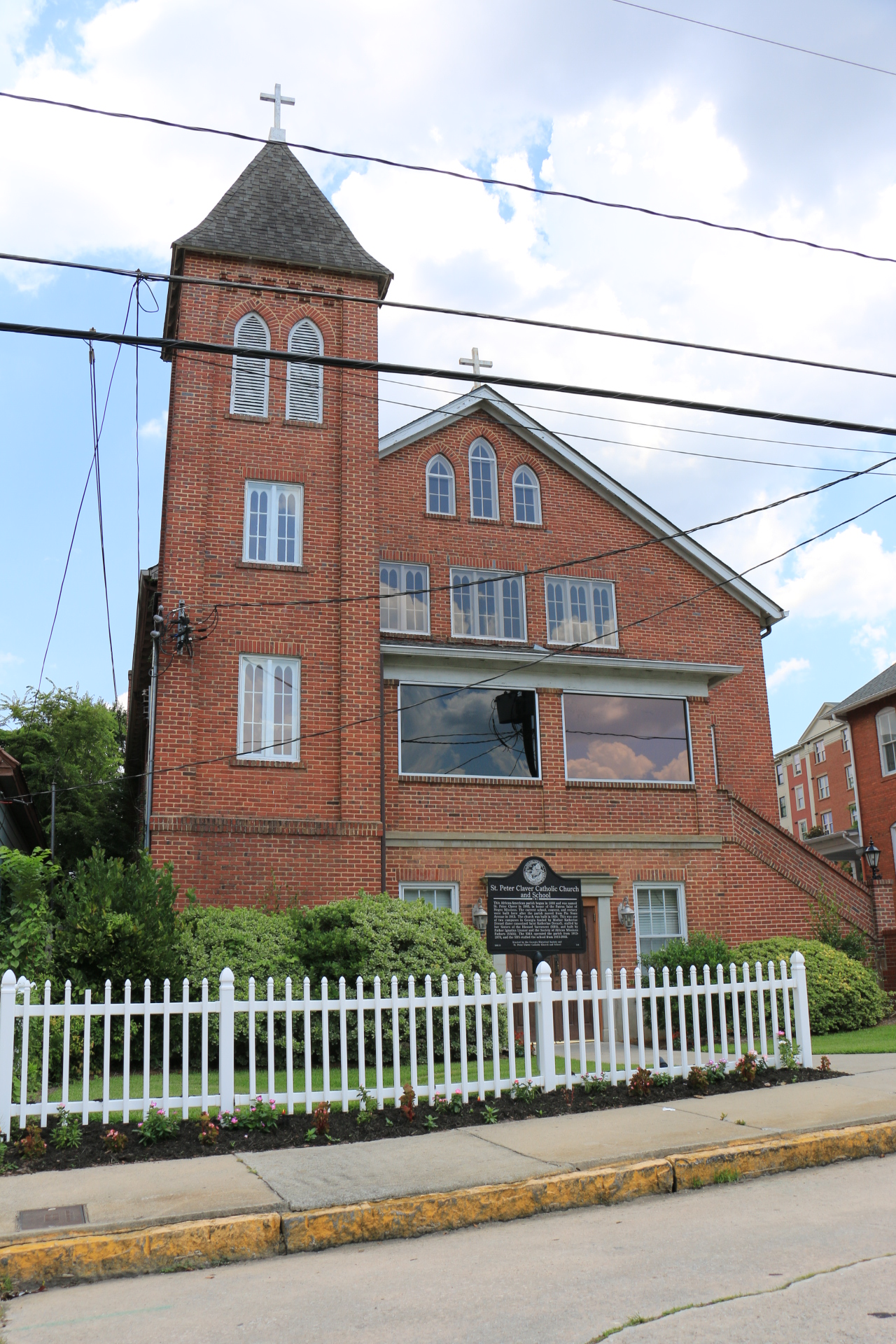
St. Peter Claver Catholic Church at 131 Ward Street

The Pleasant Hill Historic District is a historic neighborhood in Macon, Georgia, and has been known as an African American community. It is bound by Madison Street, north of Vineville Avenue, east of Rogers Avenue, and south of Neal Avenue.

The Pleasant Hill Historic District is listed on the National Register of Historic Places since May 22, 1996. It overlaps with part of the Macon Historic District, which is also listed on the National Register of Historic Places.

== History ==
The neighborhood is historically an African American community and was home to prominent members of that community. The area is bisected by I-75, an interstate. Many of the houses and buildings were created between 1870 and 1936. The area features Queen Anne style, Neoclassical style, and Craftsman style cottages, as well as “shotgun” style houses.

Notable buildings in the district include Linwood Cemetery established in 1894, the L. H. Williams Elementary School, and St. Peter Claver Catholic Church. The Booker T. Washington Center is a community center in Pleasant Hill.

Beda-Etta College was located in the neighborhood between 1921 and 1955. The Vanishing Georgia collection at the Georgia Archives have a 1924 photograph of a May Day celebration at a playground in Pleasant Hill.

== Notable residents ==
U.S. Congressman Jefferson F. Long was from Pleasant Hill, and the Jefferson Long Park was established in the area to honor him.

Little Richard grew up on the edge of the area. Other residents of the area who gained prominence included civil rights advocate and local politician, William P. Randall; visual artist, Henry W. Lucas; musical artist, Rev. Pearly Brown; entertainer, Lena Horne; and educator, Dr. Robert Williams.

Architect Louis Persley is buried at Linwood Cemetery in Pleasant Hill.
