= Louis Armstrong House =

Historic house in Queens, New York

- U.S. National Register of Historic Places
- U.S. National Historic Landmark
- New York State Register of Historic Places
- New York City Landmark
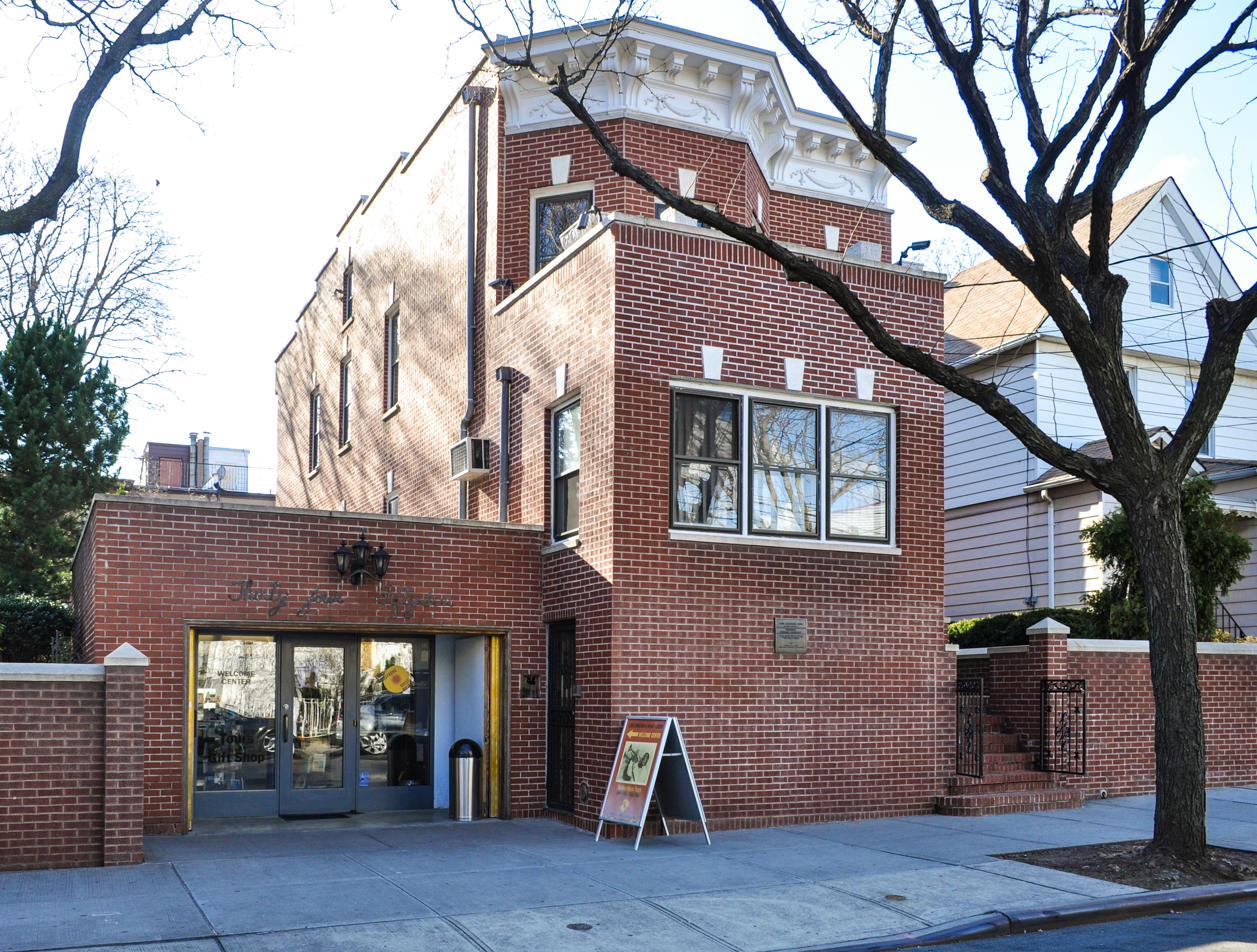
- Louis Armstrong House, 2012
- Location: 34-56 107th Street, Queens, New York
- Coordinates: 40°45′20″N 73°51′43″W
- Built: 1910
- Architect: Robert W. Johnson
- NRHP reference No.: 76001265
- NYSRHP No.: 08101.006403
- NYCL No.: 1555

Significant dates
- Added to NRHP: May 11, 1976
- Designated NHL: May 11, 1976
- Designated NYSRHP: June 23, 1980
- Designated NYCL: December 13, 1988

The Louis Armstrong House is a historic house museum at 34-56 107th Street in the Corona neighborhood of Queens in New York City. It was the home of Louis Armstrong and his wife Lucille Wilson from 1943 until his death in 1971. Lucille gave ownership of it to the city of New York in order to create a museum focused on her husband.

The house was designated a New York City Landmark in 1988 and declared a National Historic Landmark in 1976.

The home is part of the Louis Armstrong House Museum, a non-profit organization and three-building campus encompassing the historic home, the Armstrong Center and Selma's Place. The museum presents concerts, educational programs, community programs, and makes its archival collection of writings, books, recordings and memorabilia available to the public for research. The Louis Armstrong House Museum is a winner of the 2024 National Medal for Museums and Library Service from the Institute for Museum and Library Services. In September 2025, the Louis Armstrong House Museum became part of the city's Cultural Institutions Group, a partnership of cultural and educational institutions.

== Background ==
The Louis Armstrong Educational Foundation gave the house to the New York City Department of Cultural Affairs after Lucille Armstrong died in 1983. New York City designated the City University of New York, Queens College to help administer the building. The building is operated and programmed by the nonprofit organization The Louis Armstrong House Museum.

The brick house was designed by architect Robert W. Johnson and built by Thomas Daly in 1910. Some changes were made to the exterior and interior of the house when the Armstrongs moved in. The porch that was once in the front of the house was taken down and the space was added to the living room. For the exterior of the house the garden was assembled and the garage was constructed by the Armstrongs.

In addition the interior of the house was renovated to their taste. Ornate bathrooms, and the kitchen was not originally part of the house. Paintings and souvenirs were given to Louis Armstrong on tour from Asia, Europe to Africa. These gifts have found a home of their own on dressers, night stands, shelves and walls.

== Landmark designation ==
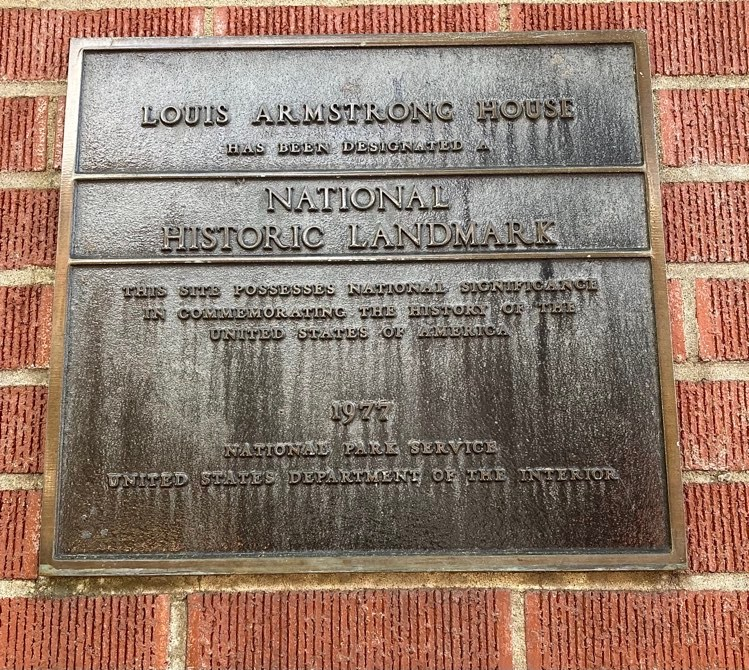
National Historic Landmark plaque on the Louis Armstrong House

The New York City Landmarks Preservation Commission held a hearing in November 1985 about whether to designated the Louis Armstrong House as a Landmark. At the hearing, a letter and a statement were read in support of the designation, and five witnesses spoke in favor. The house was designated as an individual landmark on December 13, 1988.

== Louis Armstrong Center ==
After a 2017 groundbreaking, The Louis Armstrong Center opened across the street from the Armstrongs' house in 2023. It represents the largest archives for a jazz musician with more than 60,000 items. It also features a 75-seat performance space and the multimedia exhibition Here to Stay curated by Jason Moran. The center also hosts Armstrong Now, an artist residency program. Armstrong Now, multidisciplinary artists have included Esperanza Spalding, Immanuel Wilkins, and Daniel J. Watts. Performers in the Armstrong Center's jazz room and garden have also included Jon Faddis, Nikki Giovanni, Jimmy Heath, Bria Skonberg, and Wendell Brunious.

In 2025, the city government announced plans to spend $3.5 million renovating an adjacent home formerly owned by the Heraldo family, which was to be turned into offices and community space for the museum.

== See also ==
- List of music museums
- John Coltrane Home
- Charlie Parker Residence, residence of another jazz musician that is also a New York City landmark
- List of New York City Designated Landmarks in Queens
- National Register of Historic Places listings in Queens County, New York
