= Dismuke Storehouse =

1899 commercial building in Georgia, US

- U.S. National Register of Historic Places
- Location within Georgia
- Location: 505 North Lee St., Americus, Georgia, U.S.
- Coordinates: 32°04′38″N 84°13′56″W
- Area: less than one acre
- Built: 1899
- Architect: Joseph H. Dismuke
- NRHP reference No.: 96000247
- Added to NRHP: March 7, 1996

Dismuke Storehouse, also known as Minyard's Store, is a historic commercial building built in 1899, in Americus in Sumter County, Georgia, U.S.. It has been listed on the National Register of Historic Places, since March 7, 1996, for its contributions to African American heritage, local commerce, and architecture.

== History ==
The building was constructed in 1899, by Joseph H. Dismuke, a businessman, and carpenter. It was used initially as a grocery store, where he sold vegetables purchased from local farmers.

In 1922, the building was purchased by John Minyard, and it was used to continue to operate a grocery store, and he added a cafe, that became a well-known gathering place for the local African-American community. A barbershop was added in later history.

In 1995, the site was awarded funds from the state to repair the flood damages after Tropical Storm Jerry.

== See also ==
- National Register of Historic Places listings in Sumter County, Georgia
