= Woodall–Patton House and Post Office =

- U.S. National Register of Historic Places
- Location within Georgia
- Nearest city: Ellaville, Georgia
- Coordinates: 32°19′56″N 84°20′43″W
- Area: 1 acre (0.40 ha)
- Built: 1871
- NRHP reference No.: 01001432
- Added to NRHP: January 11, 2002

Woodall–Patton House and Post Office, also known as the Schley Post Office and locally known as Patton Hill Post Office, is a historic building near Ellaville, Georgia. It is located on GA 240 3 miles west of US19, along the route between the towns of Buena Vista and Oglethorpe. The post office operated from 1888 until 1905.

The Woodall–Patton House is a frame, one-story double pen house, with a hipped roof. It has brick chimneys and is supported by brick piers, and has a full-length front porch. During 1888 to 1905, its front parlor served as the U.S. Post Office for the northwest corner of Schley, using the postal name of Schley, Georgia. Its postmaster was the owner/resident of the house: James W. Woodall (1888-1893), and then his sister, Mary Ella Woodall Patton (1893-1905).

It was added to the National Register of Historic Places in 2002. It was deemed to be "an excellent example of a double pen-type house that remains in a very unrestored state and thus contains most of its original double-pen form, floor plan, and its original floors, walls, ceilings and doors, including separate front entrance doors, as well as original porcelain knobs. It represents a good, remaining example of a rural farm dwelling from the post Civil War era."

A frame smokehouse was a contributing building on the property.

== See also ==
- National Register of Historic Places listings in Schley County, Georgia
