= List of United States federal courthouses in Texas =

Following is a list of current and former courthouses of the United States federal court system located in Texas. Each entry indicates the name of the building along with an image, if available, its location and the jurisdiction it covers, the dates during which it was used for each such jurisdiction, and, if applicable the person for whom it was named, and the date of renaming. Dates of use will not necessarily correspond with the dates of construction or demolition of a building, as pre-existing structures may be adapted or court use, and former court buildings may later be put to other uses. Also, the official name of the building may be changed at some point after its use as a federal court building has been initiated.

== Courthouses ==
| Courthouse | City | Image | Street address | Jurisdiction | Dates of use | Named for |
|---|---|---|---|---|---|---|
| U.S. Post Office and Courthouse | Abilene | | ? | N.D. Tex. | 1903–1935; Razed August 22, 1962. | n/a |
| Federal Building, U.S. Post Office and Courthouse† | Abilene | | 341 Pine Street | N.D. Tex. | 1936–present | n/a |
| U.S. Courthouse | Alpine | | 2450 N. State Highway 118 | W.D. Tex. | ?–present | n/a |
| U.S. Post Office & Courthouse | Amarillo | | 620 South Taylor Street | N.D. Tex. | 1916–1938; Now FirstCapital Bank of Texas. | n/a |
| J. Marvin Jones Federal Building and U.S. Courthouse^{†} | Amarillo | | 205 Southeast Fifth Avenue | N.D. Tex. | 1938–present | U.S. Court of Claims judge John Marvin Jones (1980) |
| Court House & Post Office† | Austin | | 601 Colorado Street | W.D. Tex. | 1881–1936; Now offices of the Texas State University System | n/a |
| U.S. Courthouse† | Austin | | 200 West 8th Street | W.D. Tex. | 1936–2012 | n/a |
| Homer Thornberry Judicial Building | Austin | | 903 San Jacinto Boulevard | W.D. Tex. | ?–present Completed in 1965. | Homer Thornberry |
| U.S. Courthouse | Austin | | 501 West 5th Street | W.D. Tex. | 2012–present | n/a |
| U.S. Post Office & Court House | Beaumont | | ? | E.D. Tex. | 1902–1933; Razed in 1933. | n/a |
| Jack Brooks Federal Building | Beaumont | | 300 Willow Street | E.D. Tex. | 1933–present | U.S. Rep. Jack Brooks (1978) |
| U.S. Court House, Custom House, & Post Office | Brownsville | | ? | W.D. Tex. S.D. Tex. | 1892–1931; Building razed. | n/a |
| U.S. Court House, Custom House, & Post Office | Brownsville | | 1001 East Elizabeth Street | S.D. Tex. | 1931–1999; Now Brownsville City Hall as well as a post office | n/a |
| Reynaldo G. Garza-Filemon B. Vela U.S. Courthouse | Brownsville | | 600 East Harrison Street | S.D. Tex. | 1999–present | Judges Reynaldo Garza and Filemon Vela, Sr. |
| 1915 Corpus Christi Federal Courthouse | Corpus Christi | | 521 Starr Street | ? | ?–2001; Originally Customs House; Now a law firm | n/a |
| Corpus Christi Federal Courthouse | Corpus Christi | | 1133 North Shoreline Boulevard | S.D. Tex. | 2001–present Built for newly created Corpus Christi Division. | n/a |
| U.S. Courthouse and Post Office | Dallas | | ? | N.D. Tex. | 1888–1930; Razed in 1939. | n/a |
| U.S. Post Office and Courthouse | Dallas | | 400 North Ervay Street | N.D. Tex. | 1930–1971; Still in use as a post office. | n/a |
| Santa Fe Office Building† | Dallas | | 1114 Commerce Street | N.D. Tex. | 1945–1971; Built in 1926; Now serves as annex to Earle Cabell Federal Building. | n/a |
| Earle Cabell Federal Bldg & Courthouse | Dallas | | 1100 Commerce Street | N.D. Tex. | 1971–present | Dallas Mayor Earle Cabell |
| U.S. Post Office and Courthouse | Del Rio | | 100 East Broadway | W.D. Tex. | 1914–? Now owned by the county. | n/a |
| Federal Building | Del Rio | | 111 East Broadway | W.D. Tex. | ?–present | n/a |
| U.S. Customs House, Post Office, & Court House | El Paso | | ? | W.D. Tex. | 1892–1936; Razed in 1936. | n/a |
| U.S. Courthouse† | El Paso | | 511 East San Antonio Avenue | W.D. Tex. | 1936–present | n/a |
| Albert Armendariz, Sr. U.S. Courthouse | El Paso | | 525 Magoffin Avenue | W.D. Tex. | 2009–present | n/a |
| Post Office and Federal Building | Fort Worth | | 914 Jennings Avenue | N.D. Tex. 5th Cir. | 1896–1934; Demolished in 1963. | n/a |
| Eldon B. Mahon United States Courthouse† | Fort Worth | | 501 West Tenth Street | N.D. Tex. 5th Cir. | 1934–present | District Court judge Eldon Brooks Mahon (2003) |
| U.S. Customs House and Courthouse† | Galveston | | 1918 Postoffice Street | E.D. Tex. S.D. Tex. | 1861–1891; 1917–1937; Now leased by GSA to the Galveston Historical Foundation. | n/a |
| U.S. Post Office, Court House & Customs Building | Galveston | | 601 25th Street | E.D. Tex. S.D. Tex. | 1891–1917; Razed in 1935 to make way for current Federal Court building. | n/a |
| U.S. Post Office, Custom House and Courthouse | Galveston | | 601 25th Street | S.D. Tex. | 1937–present | n/a |
| U.S. Post Office | Houston | | ? | S.D. Tex. | 1891–1911; Building razed. | n/a |
| U.S. Post Office and Courthouse† | Houston | | 701 San Jacinto Street | S.D. Tex. | 1911–1962; Still in use by various federal agencies. | n/a |
| Bob Casey U.S. Courthouse | Houston | | 515 Rusk Street | S.D. Tex. | 1961–present | U.S. Rep. Robert R. Casey |
| U.S. Court House & Post Office^{†} | Jefferson | | 223 West Austin | E.D. Tex. | 1890–1961; Now the Jefferson Historical Society Museum. | n/a |
| U.S. Post Office, Courthouse and Custom House† | Laredo | | 1300 Matamoros Street | S.D. Tex. | 1907–2004; Still in use as a post office. | n/a |
| George P. Kazen Federal Building and United States Courthouse | Laredo | | 1300 Victoria Street | S.D. Tex. | 2004–present | George P. Kazen |
| Lubbock Post Office and Federal Building^{†} | Lubbock | | 800 Broadway Avenue | N.D. Tex. | 1932–1968; Now privately owned | n/a |
| George H. Mahon Federal Building and U.S. Courthouse | Lubbock | | 1205 Texas Avenue | N.D. Tex. | 1971–present | U.S. Rep. George H. Mahon |
| Ward R. Burke U.S. Courthouse† | Lufkin | | 104 North Third Street | E.D. Tex. | 1980–present Completed in 1936. | Lufkin attorney Ward R. Burke (1987) |
| Sam B. Hall Jr. Federal Building and U.S. Courthouse† | Marshall | | 100 East Houston Street | E.D. Tex. | 1915–present | U.S. Rep. & District Court judge Sam B. Hall |
| George H.W. Bush and George W. Bush United States Courthouse and George Mahon Federal Building | Midland | | 200 East Wall Street | W.D. Tex. | ?–present | President George H. W. Bush (2013); President George W. Bush (2013); U.S. Rep. George H. Mahon |
| U.S. Court House & Post Office | Paris | | Northeast corner of Church St. & Lamar Ave. | E.D. Tex. | 1902–1916; Destroyed by fire in 1916. | n/a |
| U.S. Post Office & Court House | Paris | | 231 Lamar Avenue | E.D. Tex. | 1925–2002; Building now owned by Lamar County. | n/a |
| U.S. Post Office and Courthouse | Pecos | | 106 West 4th Street | W.D. Tex. | 1936–1995; Still in use as a post office. | n/a |
| Lucius D. Bunton III U.S. Courthouse | Pecos | | 410 South Cedar Street | W.D. Tex. | 1995–present | Lucius Desha Bunton III (2016) |
| United States Courthouse | Plano | | 7940 Preston Road | E.D. Tex. | 2008–present | n/a |
| O.C. Fisher Federal Building and U.S. Courthouse | San Angelo | | 33 East Twohig Avenue | N.D. Tex. | 1911–present | U.S. Rep. O. C. Fisher (1980) |
| U.S. Court House & Post Office | San Antonio | | ? | W.D. Tex. | 1890–1935; Razed in 1935. | n/a |
| Hipolito F. Garcia Federal Building and U.S. Courthouse^{†} | San Antonio | | 615 East Houston Street | W.D. Tex. | 1936–present | District Court judge Hipolito Frank Garcia (2004) |
| John H. Wood Jr. U.S. Courthouse | San Antonio | | 655 East César Chávez Boulevard | W.D. Tex. | ?–present Completed in 1968 | John H. Wood Jr. |
| Paul Brown Federal Building and U.S. Courthouse^{†} | Sherman | | 101 East Pecan Street | E.D. Tex. | 1907–present | Paul Neeley Brown (2014) |
| U.S. Courthouse and Post Office | Texarkana | | ? | E.D. Tex. | 1892–1911; Razed in 1930. | n/a |
| U.S. Court House | Texarkana | | 321 West 4th Street | E.D. Tex. | 1911–1933; Now the Texarkana Regional Arts Center. | n/a |
| U.S. Post Office and Courthouse† | Texarkana | | 500 North State Line Avenue | E.D. Tex. | 1933–present | n/a |
| U.S. Court House & Post Office | Tyler | | Bois D'Arc & West Ferguson | E.D. Tex. | 1889–1933; Razed in 1933. | n/a |
| William M. Steger Federal Building and U.S. Courthouse^{†} | Tyler | | 211 West Ferguson Street | E.D. Tex. | 1934–present | District Court judge William Steger (2006) |
| U.S. Post Office and Courthouse† | Victoria | | 210 East Constitution | S.D. Tex. | 1913–1960; Now privately owned. | n/a |
| Martin Luther King Jr. Federal Building | Victoria | | 312 South Main | S.D. Tex. | 1960–present | Martin Luther King Jr. (since c. 1993) |
| U.S. Court House & Post Office | Waco | | Southwest corner of Franklin & 4th | N.D. Tex. W.D. Tex. | 1889–1937; Sold in 1939. | n/a |
| Universal City Municipal Court | Bexar | | 2150 Universal City Blvd, Universal City, TX 78148 | W.D. Tex. | 1932–present | n/a |
| Graham B. Purcell Jr., Post Office and Federal Building | Wichita Falls | | 1000 Lamar Street | N.D. Tex. | 1933–present | Graham B. Purcell Jr. (1993) |

== Key ==
| ^{†} | Listed on the National Register of Historic Places (NRHP) |
| ^{††} | NRHP-listed and also designated as a National Historic Landmark |

== See also ==
- List of United States federal courthouses
