= Lynching of Will Jones =

- Part of Jim Crow Era
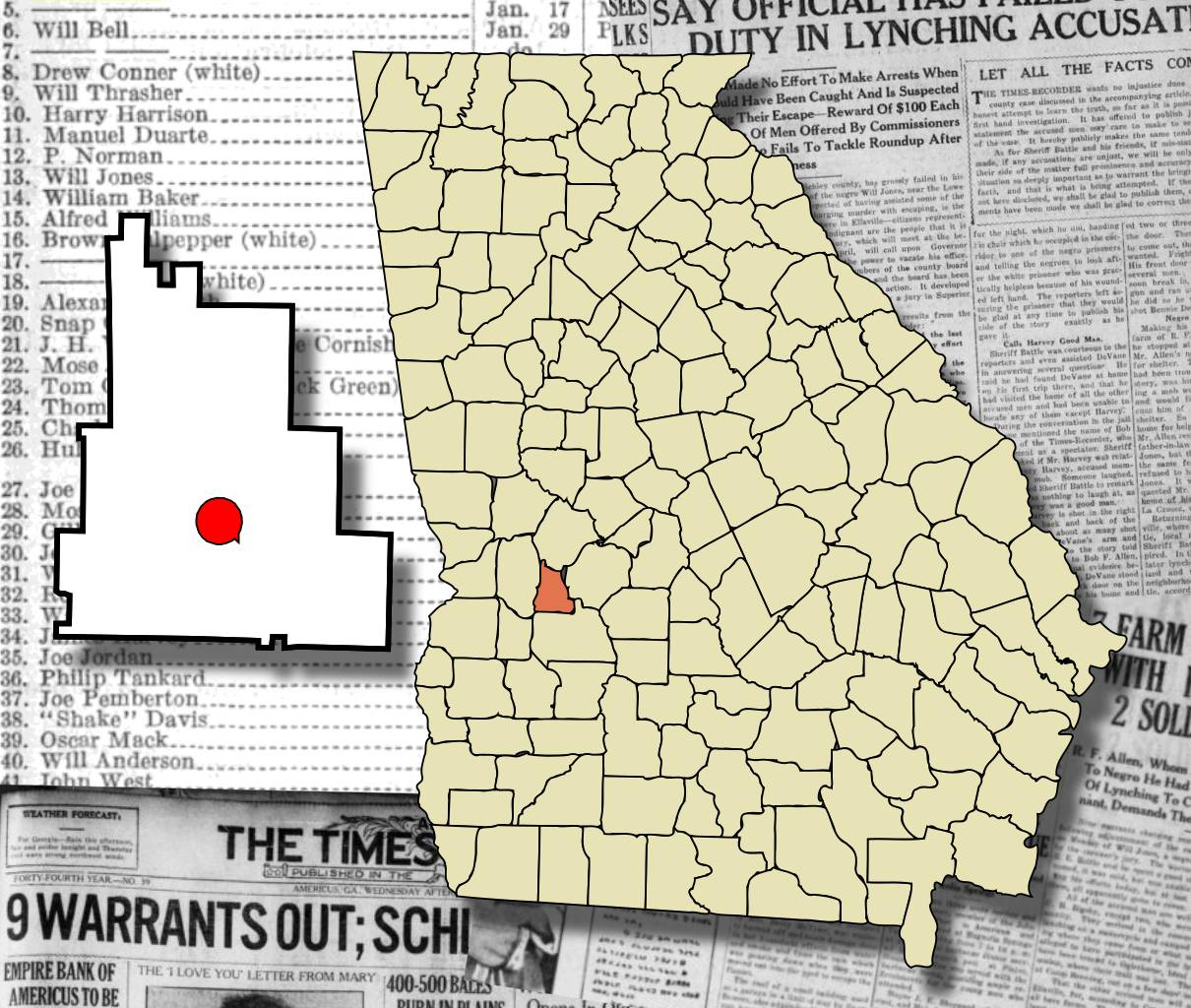
- News coverage of the Lynching of Will Jones
- Date: February 13, 1922
- Location: Ellaville, Schley County, Georgia
- Participants: Group of local farmers and at least 2 soldiers who happened to camping nearby
- Deaths: Will Jones

Will Jones was an African-American man who was lynched in Ellaville, Schley County, Georgia by a white mob on February 13, 1922. According to the United States Senate Committee on the Judiciary it was the 13th of 61 lynchings during 1922 in the United States.

== Background ==
28-year-old Will Jones lived on a farm occupied by the landowner widow Mrs. Dora Fulford, mother-in-law of Bennie DeVane one of the accused and was regarded as an upstanding citizen by the community. News coverage at the time gave no official reason for the lynching but implied it might have been either Jones was going to report on the bootlegging that was going on in the area or that Will Jones came to the defence of 26-year-old African-American man Floyd Flournoy who had insulted Jessie Mae Devane, by asking for a ride in her buggy.

== Lynching ==
Will Jones was shot at his home, near the Lowe settlement, between 10 and 11:00 PM Sunday, February 12, 1922. Before dying the next day, he was able to make a dying statement to County Commissioner Williamson and Mayor Rogers Williams that identified some of those who shot him. He said that on Sunday he was awakened by someone at his door asking for an auto-tire patch. When Jones refused to open the door, several men started to break in. He grabbed his shotgun and fled out of the back. It was here that he was shot at and where he was able to get off a few shots, wounding Bennie and Harvey. He then fled into the night and sought the help of others. Others had heard the gunshots and were too afraid to help Jones. He then fled to Ellaville. Here, a white mob has assembled and tracked him down to a small shack on the Hart farm, which is located near the line of Sumter and Schley counties around 9:00 AM. A gun battle ensued and the mob left, believing Jones dead.

== Aftermath ==
Nine men were accused of taking part in the lynching and warrants for arrest were issued by the coroner. Clarence Robinson, Thomas Brown, George Trussie Phillips, Henry Lewis Fulford, Henry Harvery (Jessie Mae Devane's father), Arthur DeVane, Bennie DeVane, and John DeVane. Schley County Sheriff R.E. Battle was accused of helping some of the accused escape the law. Seven of the nine were local farmers and two were soldiers, on leave from Camp Benning, who were camping in the area who, according to the Atlanta Constitution, "joined the mob through a spirit of excitement and adventure [rather] than because of any interest they held in the lynching of the negro."

== National memorial ==
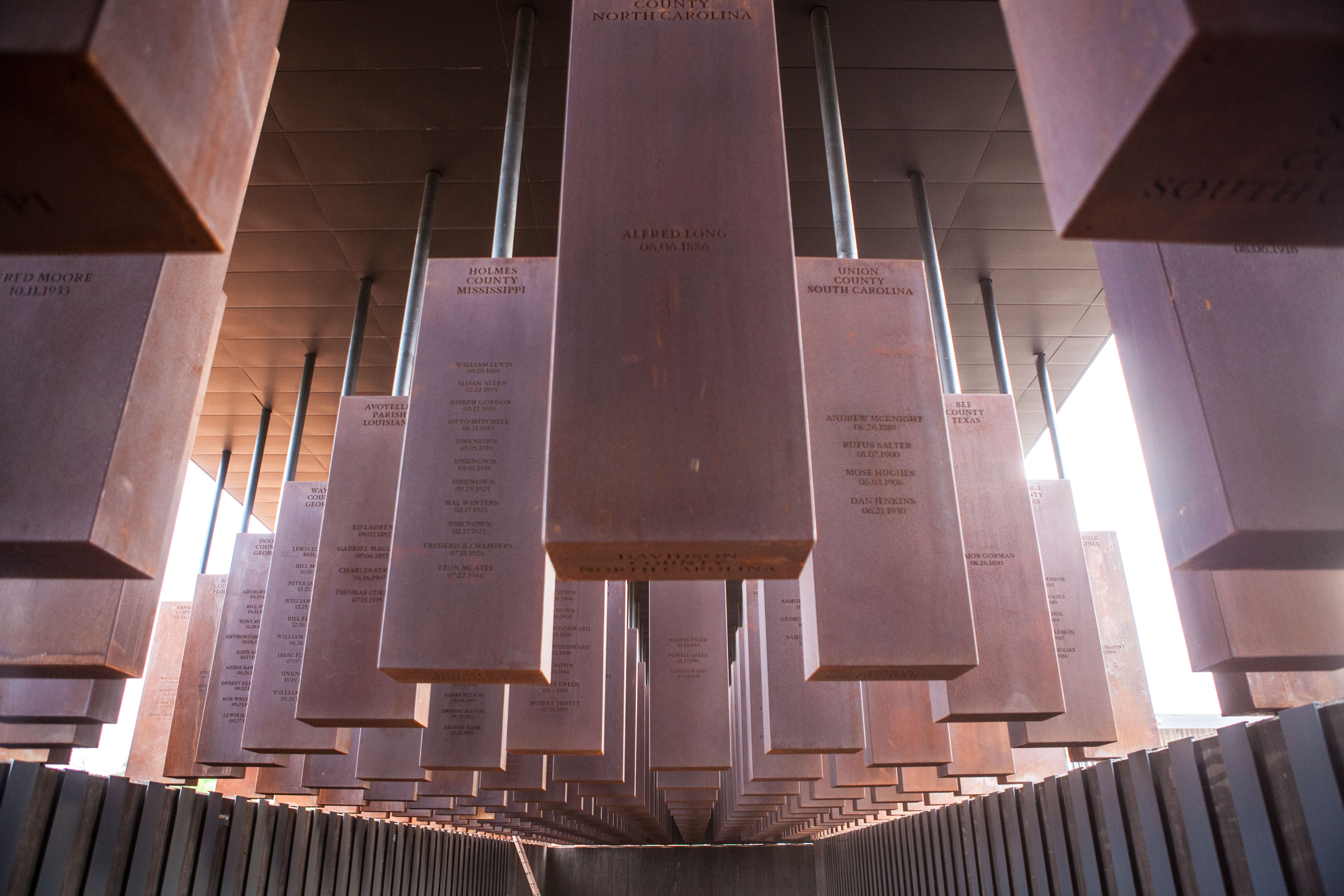
Memorial Corridor, National Memorial for Peace and Justice

The National Memorial for Peace and Justice opened in Montgomery, Alabama, on April 26, 2018, in a setting of 6 acres (2.4 ha). Featured among other things is the Memorial Corridor which displays 805 hanging steel rectangles, each representing the counties in the United States where a documented lynching took place and, for each county, the names of those lynched. The memorial hopes that communities, like Schley County, Georgia where Jones was lynched, will take these slabs and install them in their own communities.

== See also ==
- Hanging of Charles Blackman

== Bibliography ==
Notes

References

- "9 warrants out; Schley Lynchers hiding". Americus Times-Recorder. Americus, Sumter, Georgia: Times Pub. Co. February 15, 1922. pp. 1–8. ISSN 2768-6922. OCLC 21134729.
- "Say Official Has Failed To Do Duty In Lynching Accusations". Americus Times-Recorder. Americus, Sumter, Georgia: Times Pub. Co. February 17, 1922. pp. 1–8. ISSN 2768-6922. OCLC 21134729.
- Robertson, Campbell (April 25, 2018). "A Lynching Memorial Is Opening. The Country Has Never Seen Anything Like It". The New York Times.
- United States Senate Committee on the Judiciary (1926). "To Prevent and Punish the Crime of Lynching: Hearings Before the United States Senate Committee on the Judiciary, Subcommittee on S. 121, Sixty-Ninth Congress, First Session, on Feb. 16, 1926". United States Government Publishing Office.

Number	Name	Date	Place	Method of lynching	Number of victims
1	Bill McAllister	January 8, 1922	Williamsburg, S.C.	Shot	1
2	Lincoln Hickson	January 8, 1922	Williamsburg, S.C.	Shot	1
3	Willie Jenkins	January 10, 1922	Eufaula, Alabama	Shot	1
4	Jake Brooks	January 14, 1922	Oklahoma City, Oklahoma	Hanged	1
5	Charles Strong	January 17, 1922	Mayo, Florida	Hanged	1
6	Will Bell	January 29, 1922	Pontotoc, Mississippi	Shot	1
7	Unidentified	January 29, 1922	Pontotoc, Mississippi	Shot	
8	Drew Conner (White)	January 28, 1922	Bolinger, Alabama	Burned	1
9	Will Thrasher	February 1, 1922	Crystal Springs, Mississippi	Hanged	1
10	Harry Harrison	February 2, 1922	Malvern, Arkansas	Shot	1
11	Manuel Duarte	February 2, 1922	Cameron County, Texas	Shot	1
12	P. Norman	February 11, 1922	Texarkana, Arkansas	Shot	1
13	Will Jones	February 13, 1922	Ellaville, Georgia	Shot	1
14	William Baker	March 8, 1922	Aberdeen, Mississippi	Hanged	1
15	Alfred Williams	March 12, 1922	Harlem, Georgia	Hanged	1
16	Brown Culpepper (White)	March 13, 1922	Holly Grove, Louisiana	Shot	1
17	Jerry Ingram	March 17, 1922	Crawford, Mississippi	Shot	1
18	Unidentified (white)	March 19, 1922	Okay, Oklahoma	Drowned	1
19	Alexander Smith	March 22, 1922	Gulfport, Mississippi	Hanged	1
20	Snap Curry	May 6, 1922	Kirvin, Texas	Burned	1
21	H. Varney (or Johnnie Cornish)	May 6, 1922	Kirvin, Texas	Burned	1
22	Mose Jones	May 6, 1922	Kirvin, Texas	Burned	1
23	Tom Cornish	May 8, 1922	Kirvin, Texas	Hanged	1
24	Thomas Early	May 17, 1922	Conroe, Texas	Burned	1
25	Charles Atkins	May 18, 1922	Davisboro, Georgia	Burned	1
26	Hullen Owens	May 19, 1922	Texarkana, Texas	Hanged (body burned)	1
27	Joe Winters	May 20, 1922	Conroe, Texas	Burned	1
28	Mose Bozier	May 20, 1922	Alleyton, Texas	Hanged	1
29	Gilbert Wilson	May 23, 1922	Bryan, Texas	Beaten to death	1
30	Jesse Thomas	May 26, 1922	Waco, Texas	Shot (body burned)	1
31	William Byrd	May 28, 1922	Brentwood, Georgia	Shot (body burned)	1
32	Robert Collins	June 20, 1922	Summit, Mississippi	Hanged	1
33	Warren Lewis	June 23, 1922	New Dacus, Texas	Hanged	1
34	James Harvey	July 1, 1922	Lanes Bridge, Georgia	Hanged	1
35	Joe Jordan	July 1, 1922	Lanes Bridge, Georgia	Hanged	1
36	Philip Tankard	July 5, 1922	Belhaven, North Carolina	Shot	1
37	Joe Pemberton	July 7, 1922	Benton, Louisiana	Hanged	1
38	Jake "Shake" Davis	July 14, 1922	Miller County, Georgia	Hanged	1
39	Oscar Mack	July 18, 1922	Orange County, Florida	Hanged (False report, Oscar Mack survived)	1
40	Will Anderson	July 24, 1922	Allentown, Georgia	Shot	1
41	John West	July 28, 1922	Guernsey, Arkansas	Shot	1
42	Gilbert Harris	August 1, 1922	Hot Springs, Arkansas	Hanged	1
43	John Glover	August 1, 1922	Holton,	Shot	1
44	Bayner Blackwell	August 6, 1922	Swansboro, North Carolina	Shot	1
45	John Steelman	August 23, 1922	Lambert, Mississippi	Burned	1
46	Thomas Rivers	August 30, 1922	Bossier Parish, Louisiana	Hanged	1
47	F. Watt Daniels (White)	August 1922	Mer Rouge, Louisiana	Ku-Klux Klan	1
48	Thomas F. Richards (White)	August 1922	Mer Rouge, Louisiana	Ku-Klux Klan	1
49	Jim Reed Long	September 2, 1922	Winder, Georgia	Ku-Klux Klan	1
50	O.J. Johnson	September 7, 1922	Newton, Texas	Hanged	1
51	Jim Johnston	September 28, 1922	Sandersville, Georgia	Hanged	1
52	Grover C. Everett	September 28, 1922	Abilene, Texas	Shot	1
53	John Brown	October 3, 1922	Montgomery, Alabama	Shot	1
54	Ed Hartley (white)	October 20, 1922	Camden, Tennessee	Shot	1
55	George Hartley (white)	October 20, 1922	Camden, Tennessee	Shot	1
56	Elias V. Zarate	November 11, 1922	Weslaco, Texas	Shot	1
57	Cupid Dickson / Cubrit Dixon	December 5, 1922	Madison, Florida	Shot	1
58	Charles Wright	December 8 ,1922	Perry, Florida	Burned	1
59	Less Smith	December 9, 1922	Morrilton, Arkansas	Burned	1
60	George Gay	December 11, 1922	Streetman, Texas	Hanged	1
61	Arthur Young	December 11, 1922	Perry, Florida	Hanged	1
