= Schley County Courthouse =

- U.S. National Register of Historic Places
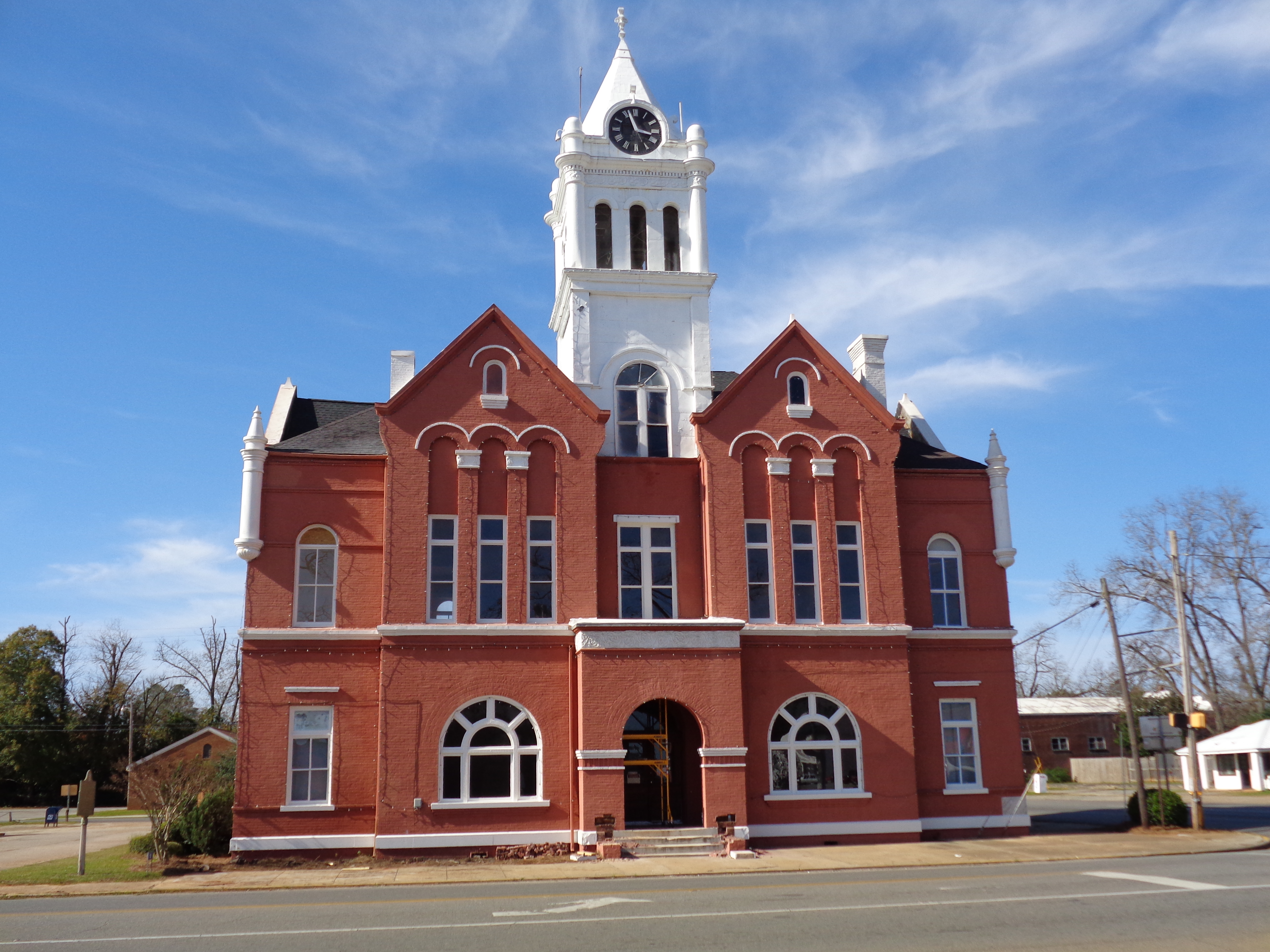

- Location within Georgia
- Location: GA 26, Ellaville, Georgia
- Coordinates: 32.23788°N 84.30898°W
- Area: less than one acre
- Built: 1899
- Architect: Golucke & Stewart, contractor Algernon Blair
- Architectural style: Romanesque Revival
- MPS: Georgia County Courthouses TR
- NRHP reference No.: 80001230
- Added to NRHP: September 18, 1980

Schley County Courthouse is a historic courthouse in Ellaville, Georgia. It is the county's second county courthouse building. Designed by Golucke & Stewart in a Romanesque Revival style, it was built in 1899. It is made of brick with stone and metal trim. The interior has a cross pan. The courtroom had a pressed metal ceiling, which has been covered over except for the balcony. It has capped clock towers.

It was added to the National Register of Historic Places on September 18, 1980. It is located on GA 26.

== See also ==
- National Register of Historic Places listings in Schley County, Georgia
