= Schley Middle High School =

Georgia school

Schley Middle/High School

Location
- 2003 U.S. Highway 19; Ellaville, (Schley County), Georgia 31806; United States
- Coordinates: 32.2169°N 84.2898°W

Information
- Type: Public high school
- School district: Schley County School District
- Principal: Harley Calhoun
- Staff: 46.30 (FTE)
- Enrollment: 672 (2023-2024)
- Student to teacher ratio: 14.51
- Colors: Black, white and silver
- Nickname: Wildcats

Schley Middle High School is located in the town of Ellaville, Georgia, United States. It is part of the Schley County School District, which covers residents of Ellaville and Murrays Crossroads. The middle school serves grades 6 through 8, while the high school serves grades 9 through 12. The school colors are black, white, and silver. The school mascot is the Wildcat.

The school is located at 2131 Highway 19 South in Ellaville. Construction on the current location began in 1999 and was completed in July 2000, with the first classes beginning in August 2000. As of the 2014/2015 school year, 708 students attended Schley County Middle High School.

In 2015, Schley Middle High School received a bronze-level award from U.S. News & World Report.

== Athletics ==
=== Football ===
Schley Middle High School has a varsity football, junior varsity, and a middle school team.

=== Basketball ===
Schley Middle High School has the following basketball teams: varsity boys, varsity girls, junior varsity boys, junior varsity girls, middle school boys, and middle school girls.

=== Baseball ===
Schley Middle High School has a varsity baseball team, a junior varsity baseball team, and a middle school team. In May 2015, Schley's varsity baseball team won the GHSA A State Championship for the first time in the school's history.

=== Golf ===
Schley Middle High School has a golf team that is open to boys and girls.

=== Softball ===
Schley Middle High School has varsity, junior varsity, and middle school softball teams.

=== Track and field ===
Schley Middle High School has a high school varsity track and field team and a middle school team.

=== Cross country ===
Schley Middle High School has a high school varsity cross country team and a middle school cross country team.

== Notable alumni ==
- Quentin Fulks, campaign manager
