= Georgia State Route 228 =

State highway in Georgia, United States

State Route 228
- Andersonville Road
- SR 228 highlighted in red

Route information
- Maintained by GDOT
- Length: 10.2 mi (16.4 km)
- Existed: 1943–present

Major junctions
- West end: US 19 / SR 3 southeast of Ellaville
- SR 271 in Andersonville
- East end: SR 49 in Andersonville

Location
- Country: United States
- State: Georgia
- Counties: Schley, Sumter

Highway system
- Georgia State Highway System; Interstate; US; State; Special
← SR 227	→ SR 229

State Route 228 (SR 228) is a 10.2-mile (16.4 km) state highway that travels west-to-east in the western part of the U.S. state of Georgia. Its travels through portions of Schley and Sumter counties.

== Route description ==
SR 228 begins at an intersection with US 19/SR 3 southeast of Ellaville. It heads east, crossing over Toteover Creek and Triple Creek, before entering Andersonville. In Andersonville, the highway intersects SR 271 (Winder Street), passes by the Andersonville Welcome Center, and crosses over a Norfolk Southern Railway line, before entering the Andersonville National Historic Site. There, it meets its eastern terminus, an intersection with SR 49, this section of which runs along the Sumter-Macon county line.

SR 228 is not part of the National Highway System, a system of routes determined to be the most important for the nation's economy, mobility and defense.

== History ==
SR 228 was established in 1943 along an alignment from an indistinguishable point in Ellaville to an intersection with SR 195 in Andersonville. This is due to the fact that SR 195 used to exist north of Andersonville. In 1953, the western half of the road was paved. By 1957, the rest of the road was paved. In 1982, when SR 195 was decommissioned north of Andersonville, the former portion of SR 195 from just northwest of Andersonville southeast into the city was redesignated as part of SR 228.

As of September 2009, SR 228 used to continue further west into Ellaville along Andersonville Road. The western terminus of SR 228 was in downtown Ellaville at US 19/SR 3 but was moved east to its current location by 2012 when a new four-lane alignment of US 19/SR 3 east of the town opened.

== Major intersections ==
County	Location	mi	km	Destinations	Notes
Schley		0.0	0.0	US 19 / SR 3	Western terminus
Sumter		8.0	12.9	G. W. McLendon Road	Former SR 195
Sumter	Andersonville	9.5	15.3	SR 271 west (Winder Street) – LaCrosse	Eastern terminus of SR 271
Sumter	Andersonville	10.2	16.4	SR 49 – Americus, Oglethorpe	Eastern terminus
1.000 mi = 1.609 km; 1.000 km = 0.621 mi
