= Algernon Blair =

American construction contractor (1873–1952)

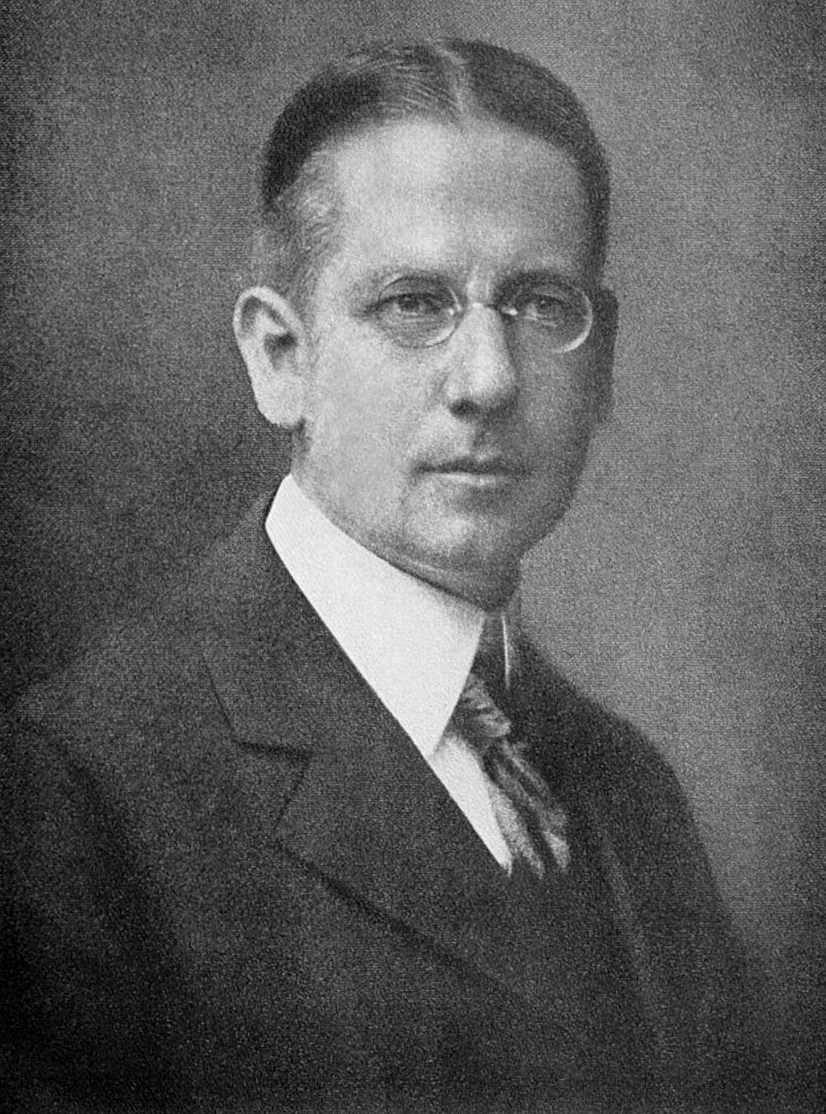
- Born: August 6, 1873; Brooklyn, New York, US
- Died: March 14, 1952 (aged 78); Boston, Massachusetts, US
- Occupation: Construction contractor

Algernon Blair (August 6, 1873 – March 14, 1952) was a construction contractor in Montgomery, Alabama. He worked on many government building projects including county courthouses and U.S. post offices. He was a member of The Thirteen, a literary and philosophical society. Several of his firm's buildings are listed on the U.S. National Register of Historic Places.

He was born in Brooklyn, New York. He corresponded with Alabama governor Benjamin Miller about a Civil Works Administration project to restore the state capitol.

United States v. Algernon Blair, Inc. was a 1973 lawsuit regarding its breach of contract with a subcontractor. The United States Court of Appeals, Fourth Circuit ruled against Algernon Blair.

Blair died in Boston on March 14, 1952.

== Works ==
- Sidney M. Aronovitz United States Courthouse (1932), Key West, Florida: Algernon Blair of Montgomery, Alabama was general contractor; Charles M. Pritchett was construction engineer.
- J .Marvin Jones Federal Building and United States Courthouse (1938), Amarillo, Texas: Algernon Blair of Montgomery, Alabama was the contractor.
- Sidney Lanier High School (1929), Montgomery Alabama: Frederick Ausfeld was the architect, and Algernon Blair the contractor.
- Austin United States Courthouse, Austin, Texas (1936), NRHP-listed
- Beeville Post Office (built 1919), 111 N. St. Mary's St. Beeville, TX (Blair, Algernon), NRHP-listed
- Bibb City Historic District, Roughly bounded by Chattahoochee River, Woodland Cir., 2nd Ave. and 35th St. Bibb City, GA (Blair, Algernon), NRHP-listed
- Building 800-Austin Hall (1931), Second St., Maxwell AFB Montgomery, AL (Blair, Algernon), NRHP-listed
- Lowndes County Courthouse, Central and Ashley Sta. Valdosta, GA (Blair, Algernon), NRHP-listed
- Luverne Historic District, Bounded by 1st, 6th Sts., Legrande, Glenwood, Folmar and Hawkins Aves. Luverne, AL (Blair, Algernon), NRHP-listed
- Old Gulfport High School (Mississippi) (1923), 2010 15th Street, Gulfport, Mississippi
- Perry Post Office, Old (1935), 201 E. Green St. Perry, FL (Blair, Algernon, Construction Co.), NRHP-listed
- Rockwood Post Office, 311 Mill St. Rockwood, TN (Blair, Algernon), NRHP-listed
- Schley County Courthouse (1899), GA 26 Ellaville, GA (Blair, Algernon), NRHP-listed
- U.S. Post Office, 104 Heber Ladner Dr. Lumberton, MS (Algernon Blair-Montgomery), NRHP-listed
- U.S. Post Office, 50 W. Chestnut St. Lancaster, PA (Blair, Algernon), NRHP-listed
- US Post Office, 1st and Everett Sts. Morgan City, LA (Blair, Algernon), NRHP-listed
- US Post Office (1936), 382 S. Main St. Milan, TN (Blair, Algernon), NRHP-listed
- US Post Office, Old--Ripley, 301 N. Main St. Ripley, MS (Blair, Algernon), NRHP-listed
- US Post Office-Forest, 119 Second St. Forest, MS (Blair, Algernon), NRHP-listed
- US Post Office-Hazlehurst, 130 Caldwell Dr. Hazlehurst, MS (Blair, Algernon), NRHP-listed
