= Schley County School District =

School district in Georgia (U.S. state)

Address
- 204 Perry Drive Ellaville, Georgia, 31806-3146; United States
- Coordinates: 32.23933°N 84.315077°W

District information
- Grades: Pre-school - 12
- Superintendent: Brian Hall
- Accreditation(s): Southern Association of Colleges and Schools; Georgia Accrediting Commission

Students and staff
- Enrollment: 1,311
- Faculty: 66

Other information
- Telephone: 229-937-2405
- Website: www.schleyk12.org

The Schley County School District is a public school district in Schley County, Georgia, United States, based in Ellaville. It serves the communities of Ellaville and Murrays Crossroads.

== Schools ==
The Schley County School District has one elementary school and one middle-high school.

=== Elementary school ===
- Schley County Elementary School

=== Middle-high school ===
- Schley Middle High School
