= United States Courthouse (Austin, Texas, 1936) =

Historic structure in Austin, Texas

- Austin U.S. Courthouse
- U.S. National Register of Historic Places
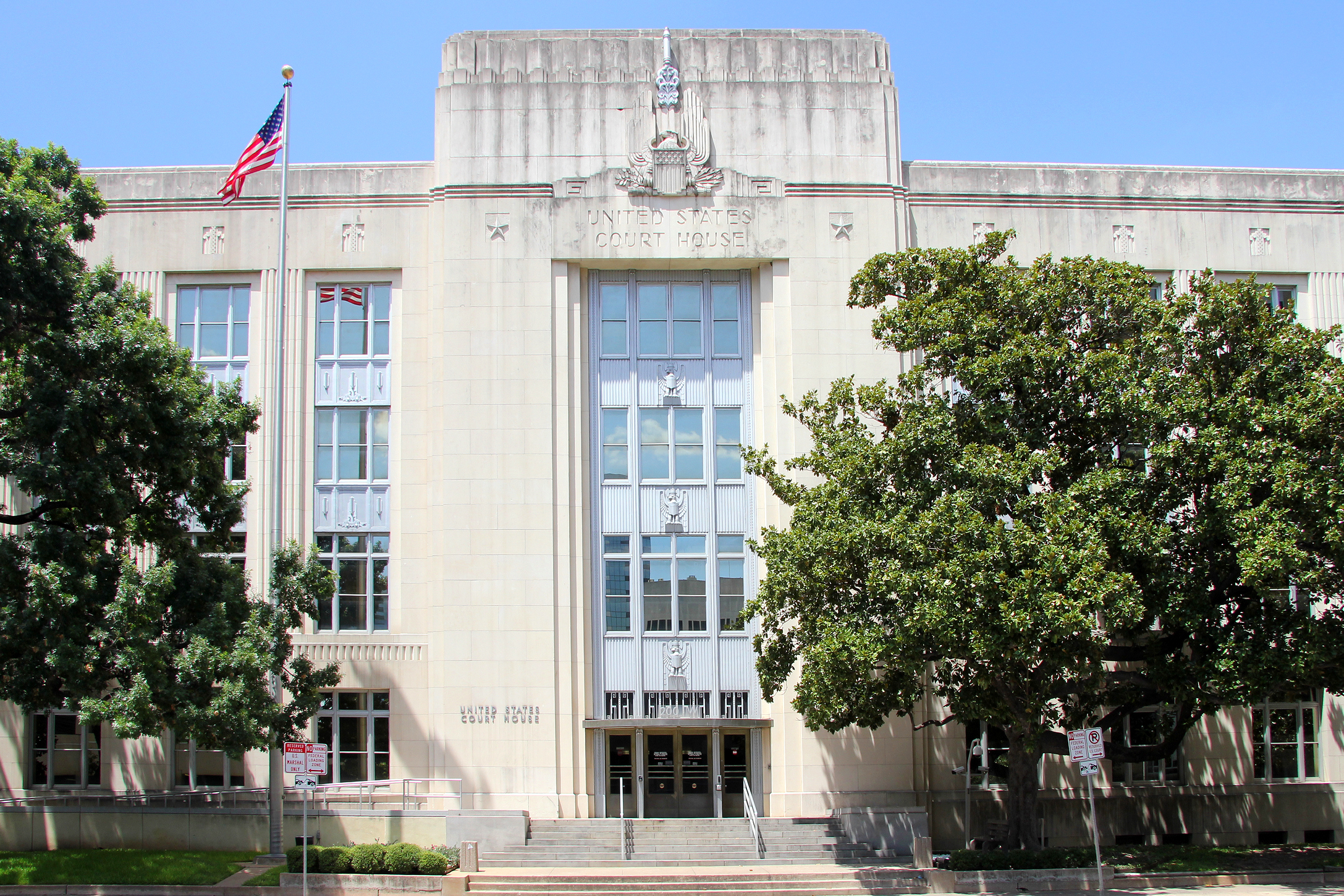
- The courthouse's south facade in 2011

- Location within Texas Location within the United States
- Interactive map showing the location of Austin U.S. Courthouse
- Location: 200 West Eighth St. Austin, Texas
- Coordinates: 30°16′13″N 97°44′36″W
- Area: 1.4 acres (0.57 ha)
- Built: 1936
- Built by: Algernon Blair
- Architect: Louis A. Simon, Charles Henry Page, Kenneth Franzheim
- Architectural style: Modern Movement, Moderne
- NRHP reference No.: 01000432
- Added to NRHP: April 25, 2001

The Austin United States Courthouse is a historic former federal courthouse in downtown Austin, Texas. Built between 1935 and 1936, the building exemplifies Depression-era Moderne architecture, while Art Moderne and Art Deco finishes characterize the interior. It housed the Austin division of the United States District Court for the Western District of Texas and other judicial offices until 2012, when a new federal courthouse building was completed. Since 2016 the building has been owned by Travis County, and it has housed the county probate courts since 2020. The structure was added to the National Register of Historic Places in 2001.

== History ==
Austin's previous U.S. courthouse was built between 1877 and 1881, but by the 1920s the federal district court had come to need additional space. After considering expanding the existing structure, authorities instead selected a new site for a larger building. In June 1934, Congress passed a measure appropriating $415,000 for the construction of the new U.S. courthouse in Austin, with some funding coming from the Public Works Administration. The groundbreaking ceremony was held on September 16, 1935, and the building was dedicated and opened to the public by mayor Tom Miller on September 22, 1936.

In addition to its main tenant (the Austin division of the District Court for the Western District of Texas), the Austin U.S. courthouse of 1936 has held the offices of the Collector of Internal Revenue, the Referee in Bankruptcy (later the U.S. Bankruptcy Court), the U.S. Weather Bureau, the U.S. Probation and Pretrial Services Office, and other judicial functions related to the U.S. Department of Justice such as the U.S. Marshal's Office. It has also housed U.S. representatives and senators, including Lyndon B. Johnson.

By the 2000s the tenants of the courthouse were once again running out of space, and funds from the federal American Recovery and Reinvestment Act of 2009 were used to construct another even larger federal courthouse building for Austin. The new courthouse was completed and opened to the public in December 2012, at which point all federal courts and offices in the old building were closed. At the time it was not clear what the fate of the building would be.

=== Post-closure ===
In 2013 the Austin Bar Foundation asked the GSA to lease the old courthouse to hold several local legal programs, but the GSA declined, saying that it intended to "use the courthouse for judiciary-related services that were not able to fit into the new courthouse," most likely the U.S. Bankruptcy Court and the local members of the New Orleans–based 5th U.S. Circuit Court of Appeals, which had been operating in a separate office building. However, no new federal courts ever occupied the facility.

Instead, in November 2015 the GSA announced that it had begun to consider the old courthouse for disposal proceedings as an excess asset. The facility and the land it occupies were designated as surplus property in May 2016, after which Travis County began talks with the GSA about using the building for additional county court space, in part because of the recent failure of a bond measure to raise funds to replace the aging Travis County Courthouse. The City of Austin had considered pursuing the site as well, but it ultimately decided to support the county's bid for the courthouse; other nongovernmental organizations also applied to the GSA for the use of the building, including some hoping to use the facility for services to assist the homeless.

At a press conference on December 29, 2016, officials from Travis County and the federal judiciary and local U.S. Representative Lloyd Doggett announced that ownership of the courthouse had been transferred to Travis County. The county budgeted $28 million to bring the structure up to current building codes and adapt it for use as the new site of the county probate courts. After a seventeen-month renovation, staff from the probate courts and county clerk's offices moved into the building in October 2020, and the facility was rededicated on November 18, 2020.

== Architecture ==
The Austin U.S. Courthouse is a four-story steel-and-concrete building clad with cream-colored limestone. Its design exemplifies the PWA Moderne architectural style of many Great Depression-era public buildings, with its symmetrical rectangular form, recessed vertical window bays, and smooth stonework exterior decorated with neoclassical flourishes, stylized eagles and geometric detailing. The building was designed by local architect Charles Henry Page (well known for his work on other Texas courthouses of the period), together with New York architect Kenneth Franzheim. The design work was overseen by Louis A. Simon, the Supervising Architect for the U.S. Treasury Department. The construction contractor was Algernon Blair of Montgomery, Alabama. The W. E. Simpson Company of San Antonio served as the structural engineer, and R. F. Taylor of Houston was the mechanical engineer.

=== Exterior ===
The main entry is in the south facade, where gray granite steps lead to four bronze doors beneath a central massing that projects from the front and top of the building. A large carved eagle with a shield near the peak recreates the Great Seal of the United States, below which is inscribed "UNITED STATES COURT HOUSE" flanked by raised five-pointed stars. A fluted horizontal band separates the windows of the first and second floors, while the higher windows are joined in recessed vertical window bays with decorative cast-iron spandrels between. Pilasters run vertically between window bays from the second floor to the fourth. An incised horizontal band wraps the building near the roofline, and the structure's square corners gradually chamfer as they approach the roof.

=== Interior ===
The building's interior exhibits Art Moderne and Art Deco finishes and detailing. The lobbies and corridors have marble and plaster walls, geometrically patterned terrazzo floors, and plaster ceilings with white bronze molding. The ceremonial courtroom is a double-height chamber with wall paneling of light bookmatched wood set in darker wood squares and a coffered plaster ceiling. Light fixtures range from white-bronze-and-glass chandeliers to wall sconces with Art Deco detailing.

=== Gallery ===
Exterior details in 2013

Elevator lobby

Hall detail

Light fixture

Lobby

Courtroom door

Courtroom

Courtroom eagle

Stairs

Stairs from above

== See also ==
- List of United States federal courthouses in Texas
- National Register of Historic Places listings in Travis County, Texas
