= Georgia State Route 271 =

State highway in Georgia, United States

State Route 271
- SR 271 highlighted in red

Route information
- Maintained by GDOT
- Length: 7.6 mi (12.2 km)
- Existed: 1950–present

Major junctions
- West end: US 19 / SR 3 southeast of Ellaville
- East end: SR 228 in Andersonville

Location
- Country: United States
- State: Georgia
- Counties: Schley, Sumter

Highway system
- Georgia State Highway System; Interstate; US; State; Special
← SR 270	→ SR 272

State Route 271 (SR 271) is a 7.6-mile-long (12.2 km) east–west state highway located in the west-central part of the U.S. state of Georgia. Its route is within Schley and Sumter counties.

== Route description ==
SR 271 begins at an intersection with US 19/SR 3 southeast of Ellaville. The route heads east, and then northeast, to the unincorporated community of LaCrosse, where it intersects Lacrosse Road and a Norfolk Southern Railway line.

The highway continues northeast, and curves to the east until it intersects Schley County Road 19. After that, SR 271 continues heading east, and then curves to the northeast until it meets its eastern terminus at SR 228 (Ellaville Street) in Andersonville.

== History ==
SR 272 was established in 1950 along the same alignment as it runs today. By 1957, the whole length of the highway was paved.

== Major intersections ==
County	Location	mi	km	Destinations	Notes
Schley		0.0	0.0	US 19 / SR 3 (North Broad Street)	Western terminus
Sumter	Andersonville	7.6	12.2	SR 228 (Ellaville Street) – Ellaville, Andersonville	Eastern terminus
1.000 mi = 1.609 km; 1.000 km = 0.621 mi
