= National Register of Historic Places listings in Schley County, Georgia =

This is a list of properties and districts in Schley County, Georgia that are listed on the National Register of Historic Places (NRHP).

This National Park Service list is complete through NPS recent listings posted March 14, 2025.

== Current listings ==
	Name on the Register	Image	Date listed	Location	City or town	Description
1	Schley County Courthouse	Schley County Courthouse	September 18, 1980 (#80001230)	GA 26; 32°14′16″N 84°18′32″W	Ellaville	
2	Woodall-Patton House and Post Office		January 11, 2002 (#01001432)	GA 240, 3 mi. W of US19; 32°19′55″N 84°20′42″W	Ellaville vicinity	
