= Hanging of Charles Blackman =

Public execution in Texas in 1889

The hanging of Charles Blackman occurred in Ellaville, Georgia, on January 25, 1889. Stonewall Tondee, a white man, had been murdered on September 5, 1885. Charles Blackman, an African-American man, was tried and convicted for the murder in three trials by all-white, "gentleman" juries. The Georgia Supreme Court twice granted Blackman a new trial, but he was convicted and sentenced to hang a third time in September 1888. Blackman was twice granted respite by Georgia Governor John Brown Gordon after the third trial, which delayed Blackman's execution by three months. Blackman maintained his innocence until his public execution and insisted that he was never given an impartial trial. 5,000 people from across South Georgia travelled to Ellaville, a town of a few hundreds, to witness the hanging. Telegraph wires were cut to ensure that messages from Governor Gordon and other state officials would not be transmitted and interfere with the hanging.

== Murder of Stonewall Tondee ==
Stonewall Tondee was the 22-year-old son of the Treasurer of Schley County, Georgia, and worked as a store clerk in Ellaville. Late in the evening on Saturday, September 5, 1885, Tondee was waiting on customers in the store when someone outside in a cotton patch shot him through the window with a shotgun. Patrons in the store called out for help, and a doctor reached him five minutes after the shooting. Tondee died three minutes after the doctor arrived. A crowd soon assembled to consider who killed Tondee, a "universal favorite" of the town. Suspicion fell on Charles Blackman, who supposedly was "jealous of Mr. Tondee about a negro woman" and "had made threats against him." Witnesses reported to have seen Blackman in Ellaville on Saturday night and travelling to Americus Sunday morning, but Blackman's brother claimed Blackman spent Saturday night in his home near Americus. Though residents of Ellaville discussed letting "Judge Lynch" decide Blackman's fate, prominent figures in the town advocated letting the law take its course.

== Trials and convictions ==
Shortly after the murder of Stonewall Tondee, Charles Blackman was arraigned by a coroner's jury and was sent out of Ellaville to the Sumter County Jail out of concern that a mob would abduct and lynch Blackman. Blackman had no counsel so the judge appointed lawyers to defend him. On the day of the first trial, October 3, 1885, a reporter wrote that the Ellaville courthouse was "packed from foundation to ceiling with the wealth, the chivalry, the intelligence, the rags, the depravity, and the filth of the county." Witnesses gave testimonies regarding sightings of Blackman on the day of the murder, threats Blackman made against Tondee, and the path taken by the murderer of Tondee after fleeing the scene of the crime. The arguments then began and lasted well into the evening, with Blackman's counsel arguing that the evidence was circumstantial and inconclusive. The next morning, the jury delivered its verdict that Blackman was guilty, and the judge sentenced Blackman to hang on November 6, 1885.

Blackman's case was appealed to the Supreme Court of Georgia in November 1885, delaying the hanging by at least one year. The Georgia Supreme Court granted Blackman a new trial on the grounds that Blackman was not able to sufficiently confer with his counsel. The jury in Blackman's second trial once again found him guilty, and he was sentenced to hang by a judge. The Georgia Supreme Court granted Blackman a third trial on the basis of procedural errors, and Blackman was sentenced to hang for a third time in September 1888. Georgia Governor Gordon twice granted respite, which delayed Blackman's execution by three months while the case was being appealed to the Georgia Supreme Court for the third time. The Georgia Supreme Court affirmed the verdict of the lower court, and Blackman's execution was set to occur on January 25, 1889.

Shortly before Blackman's execution in January 1889, a reporter from The Atlanta Constitution asked Blackman if he had received an impartial trial. Blackman responded, "Impartial trial. No sir! I have had no trial at all. If I had been allowed to talk I could have told a great deal, but when I commenced talking I saw blood in the eyes of the people of Schley County and was afraid to say anything."

== Hanging ==
Residents of South Georgia were eager to witness the hanging of Charles Blackman. A special excursion train ran from Americus, a nearby larger town, to Ellaville so that spectators would be able to witness the event. Though Ellaville's population was relatively small, thousands of spectators travelled to Ellaville to witness the hanging of Charles Blackman. It was estimated that 5000 people were present. The sheriff roped off the area with the gallows due to the large crowd. Citizens of Ellaville were fearful that Governor Gordon or other officials would once again intervene and prevent or delay the hanging so they cut Ellaville's telegraph wires. This way, no messages could be received, and the hanging would commence as planned.

In an interview with The Atlanta Constitution, Blackman maintained his innocence and said that his "'heart is like wax before the flame.'" A reverend was brought in for Blackman and requested that Blackman confess if he is guilty, to which Blackman responded that he is not. Other reverends and Blackman's brother visited him before the hanging as well.

Blackman's last words are as follows:

"Well fellow-men, this is my last opportunity that you will ever hear my voice again in this lowland of sin and sorrow. I tell you all I die today an innocent man. I soon make my departure to a land where no sorrow can reach me. My lawyers have done all they could, and, if it is according to the will of God, I am willing to go. Farewell to you all."

Blackman "made several convulsive jerks" after "the trigger was sprung." Blackman shortly became still and was pronounced dead after hanging for ten minutes.

== Aftermath ==
The hanging of Charles Blackman is notable for the cutting of telegraph wires to prevent outside intervention. The technique of cutting communication lines was later used across Georgia, including in the abduction and lynching of Paul Reed and Will Cato in 1904 and Leo Frank in 1915. Telecommunication technologies such as telegraphs and telephones became increasingly important elements of lynchings across the country. A mob in West Virginia in 1912 cut telephone lines to a jail so that it could abduct and lynch Walter Johnson, doing so by hanging him from a telephone pole and shooting him. Residents of Waco, Texas, in 1916 used telephones to spread the news of the lynching of Jesse Washington; a crowd of over 10,000 spectators showed up to view Washington being stabbed, beaten, castrated, hanged, and burned.

Ellaville was the later the site of multiple lynchings, including the triple lynching of Dawson Jordan, Charles Pickett, and Murray Burton by a mob that also burned down a school, two churches, and three Black lodges in 1911.

Charles Blackman was buried in Ellaville after his public execution on January 25, 1889. There were rumors circulating that his body would be stolen so his brother, Richard Blackman, went to protect the grave. On the night of January 26, "mischievous boys" went to the cemetery to disturb Blackman. On the night of January 27, as a white man approached the grave, Richard Blackman shot and wounded the man out of suspicion that he wanted to steal the body of his brother.

== Classification as a lynching ==
The hanging of Charles Blackman has elements of a lynching, the distinguishing factor of which is extrajudicial action. The cutting of the telegraph wires by the residents of Ellaville to prevent the interference of authorities was an illegal action taken to guarantee Blackman's hanging. Blackman was never granted a fair trial with an impartial jury of his peers. However, Blackman's hanging is distinguished from typical lynchings of the era that featured abductions, extrajudicial mock "trials," and mob violence.

Contemporaneous newspaper reports encouraged extrajudicial action and the lynching of Charles Blackman.

An initial report from The New York Times regarding the murder of Stonewall Tondee was entitled "A Candidate for Lynching."

After Blackman's case was appealed to the Georgia Supreme Court, The Atlanta Constitution wrote a story entitled "The Gallows Cheated" that characterized the murder of Stonewall Tondee as "one of the most deliberate planned murders ever perpetrated" and reported that everyone thinks Blackman will confess "when he is certain he will be hung." The escalating rhetoric of reporting from 1885 to 1889 coincided with increased public "excitement" for the execution and increased willingness to circumnavigate the legal process, as "mob law may be harsh but cuts off lots of expense."

== See also ==
- Lynching of Will Jones
