= United States Courthouse (Austin, Texas, 2012) =

Judicial building in Austin, Texas

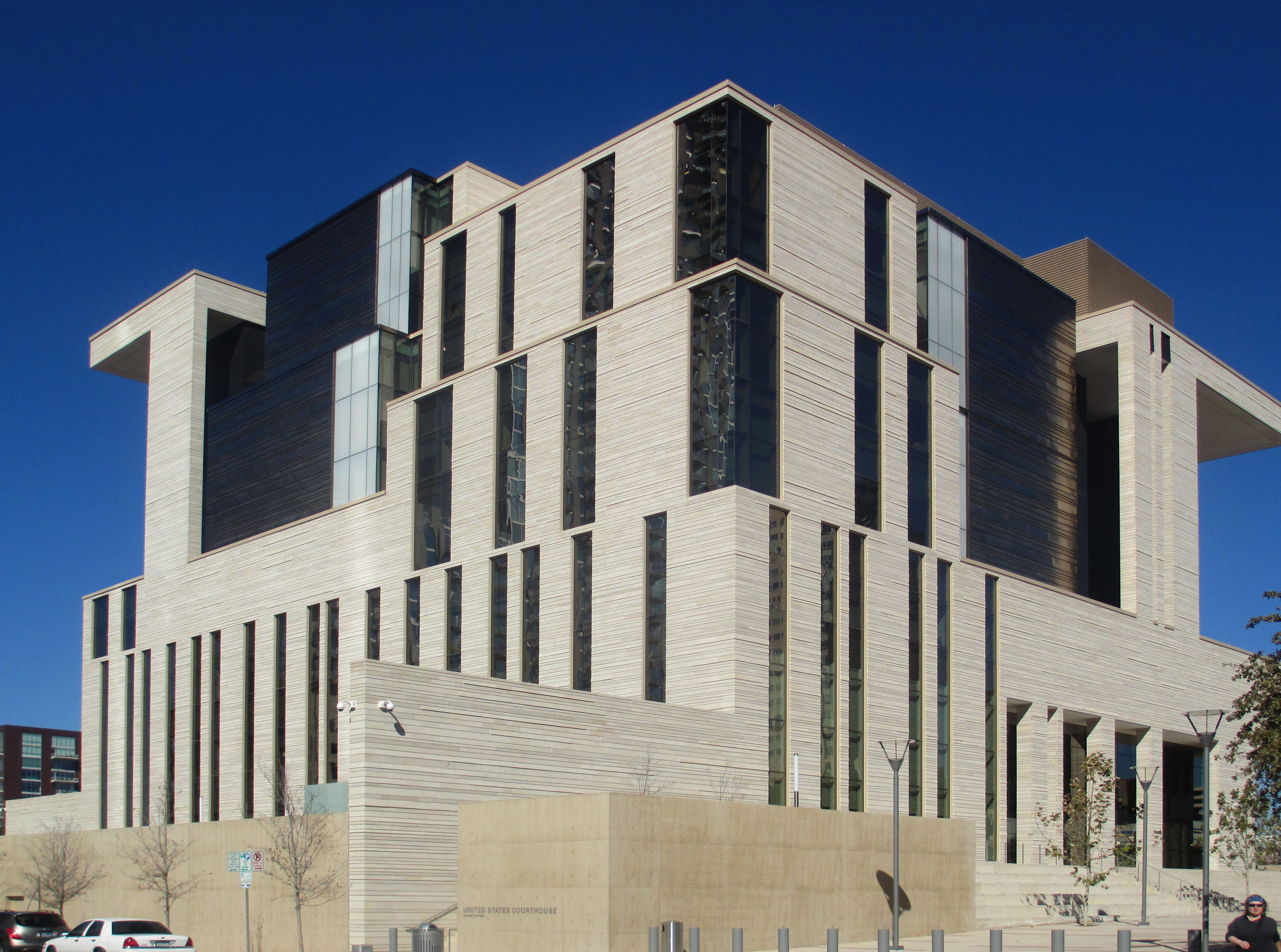
- Viewed from the southeast

- Location within Texas Location within the United States

General information
- Architectural style: Modernist
- Location: 510 W 5th St. Austin, Texas 78701
- Coordinates: 30.2681°N 97.7484°W
- Groundbreaking: September 2009
- Completed: November 30, 2012
- Opened: December 3, 2012
- Cost: $123 million
- Owner: General Services Administration

Height
- Height: 135 feet (41 m)

Technical details
- Floor count: 8
- Floor area: 252,420 square feet (23,451 m^{2})

Design and construction
- Architecture firm: Mack Scogin Merrill Elam Architects
- Civil engineer: Page Southerland Page
- Main contractor: White Construction Company
- Awards: 2014 GSA Design Award

The Austin United States Courthouse is a federal courthouse in downtown Austin, Texas. Built between 2009 and 2012, the building houses the Austin division of the United States District Court for the Western District of Texas and other federal judicial offices. It replaced the 1936 Austin U.S. Courthouse, which has since been transferred to Travis County to hold county judicial space.

== History ==
Austin's previous federal courthouse was built in 1936 under the Public Works Administration. By the 2000s, Austin's population growth in the intervening decades had increased the court's caseload beyond what the courthouse could support. In 2002 the General Services Administration retained architects to design a new, larger courthouse complex for Austin, and in 2004 the GSA purchased a parcel of land in downtown Austin to eventually hold the facility. At the time, the plot held a derelict and incomplete structure that had once been intended as a computer processor design center for Intel, known locally after its abandonment as the "Intel Shell." The GSA demolished this structure in 2007 and indicated that it planned to begin building a new courthouse in 2009, to be completed in 2012.

When the federal government enacted the American Recovery and Reinvestment Act of 2009 in response to the then-ongoing Great Recession, some of the economic stimulus funds were allocated for the construction of the new Austin courthouse. Construction contractors broke ground in September 2009, with plans to complete the building in three years on a budget of $96 million (equivalent to $144 million in 2025); in fact, with modest delays and cost overages, the construction lasted for three years and three months and ultimately cost $123 million (equivalent to $172 million in 2025). The new courthouse was opened to the public on December 3, 2012, at which point all federal courts and offices in the old building were transferred to the new facility.

== Design ==
The Austin U.S. Courthouse is an eight-story steel-and-concrete building clad with cream-colored limestone. The courthouse has a modernist design, with a stark cubic form and geometric external details. The facility was designed by Atlanta-based architectural firm Mack Scogin Merrill Elam Architects and built by the White Construction Company, with additional civil engineering by Page Southerland Page.

=== Exterior ===
The courthouse complex occupies the full city block between Fourth, Fifth, San Antonio and Nueces Streets, immediately west of Republic Square. The exterior is covered in a mixture of banded limestone cladding, dark stainless steel, and narrow multi-story glazing. The rectangular form sits atop a concrete plinth set back 50 feet (15 m) from the streets, creating broad sidewalks on all sides. The segment of San Antonio street between the courthouse and Republic Square is closed to vehicles, forming a wide plaza of concrete pavers, wooden benches and shade trees in front of the courthouse's principal, eastern facade. The main entrance is in the northeast corner at ground level.

=== Interior ===
The building contains eight courtrooms and ten judge's chambers, with the major interior spaces characterized by wood paneling of warm-colored pecan and pervasive daylighting. The courtrooms, jury chambers and public spaces hug the exterior walls, making use of the multi-story windows for light and external views. As much glass is used within the structure as in its external envelope, encouraging the diffusion of natural light into interior spaces and extending sight lines. The abundant use of glass and windows was meant to symbolically express the importance of transparency to the operation of the justice system and the public's confidence in it.

==== The Austin Wall ====
The two-story ground-level lobby connects to an atrium which runs the length of the building from west to east, providing external views of the Austin skyline to the east and the Texas Hill Country to the west. The lobby is separated from the jury assembly chamber by a 784-square-foot (72.8 m^{2}) stained-glass mural by artist Clifford Ross, titled The Austin Wall. The upper portion of the mural is a composite of brightly colored hanging panels, and the lower, black-and-white portion doubles as a set of doors. The work is a representation of high-resolution photographs of the Texas Hill Country; it was developed using a combination of traditional stained-glass techniques (in cooperation with Franz Mayer & Co. of Munich) and digital printing.

== Reception ==
In 2016, the building's architecture received an award from the Justice Facilities Review from the American Institute of Architects. It has been called an example of the "innovative public building projects that embrace contemporary design strategies and material approaches" that were enabled by the 1962 "Guiding Principles for Federal Architecture" directive. In 2020, the Trump administration announced an executive order to rewrite national guidelines for federal architecture. A draft of the executive order, titled "Make Federal Buildings Great Again", cited the Austin United States Courthouse as an example of a federal building “influenced by Brutalism and Deconstructivism" and having “little aesthetic appeal.”

== See also ==
- List of United States federal courthouses in Texas
