= La Crosse, Georgia =

- Unincorporated community
- Location within Georgia
- Coordinates: 32°11′13″N 84°14′25″W
- Country: United States
- State: Georgia
- County: Schley
- Elevation: 522 ft (159 m)
- Time zone: UTC-5 (Eastern (EST))
  - Summer (DST): UTC-4 (EDT)
- Area code: 229
- GNIS feature ID: 326357

La Crosse (also La Cross, Lacross) is an unincorporated community in Schley County, Georgia, United States.
