= Intel Shell =

Building in Austin, Texas

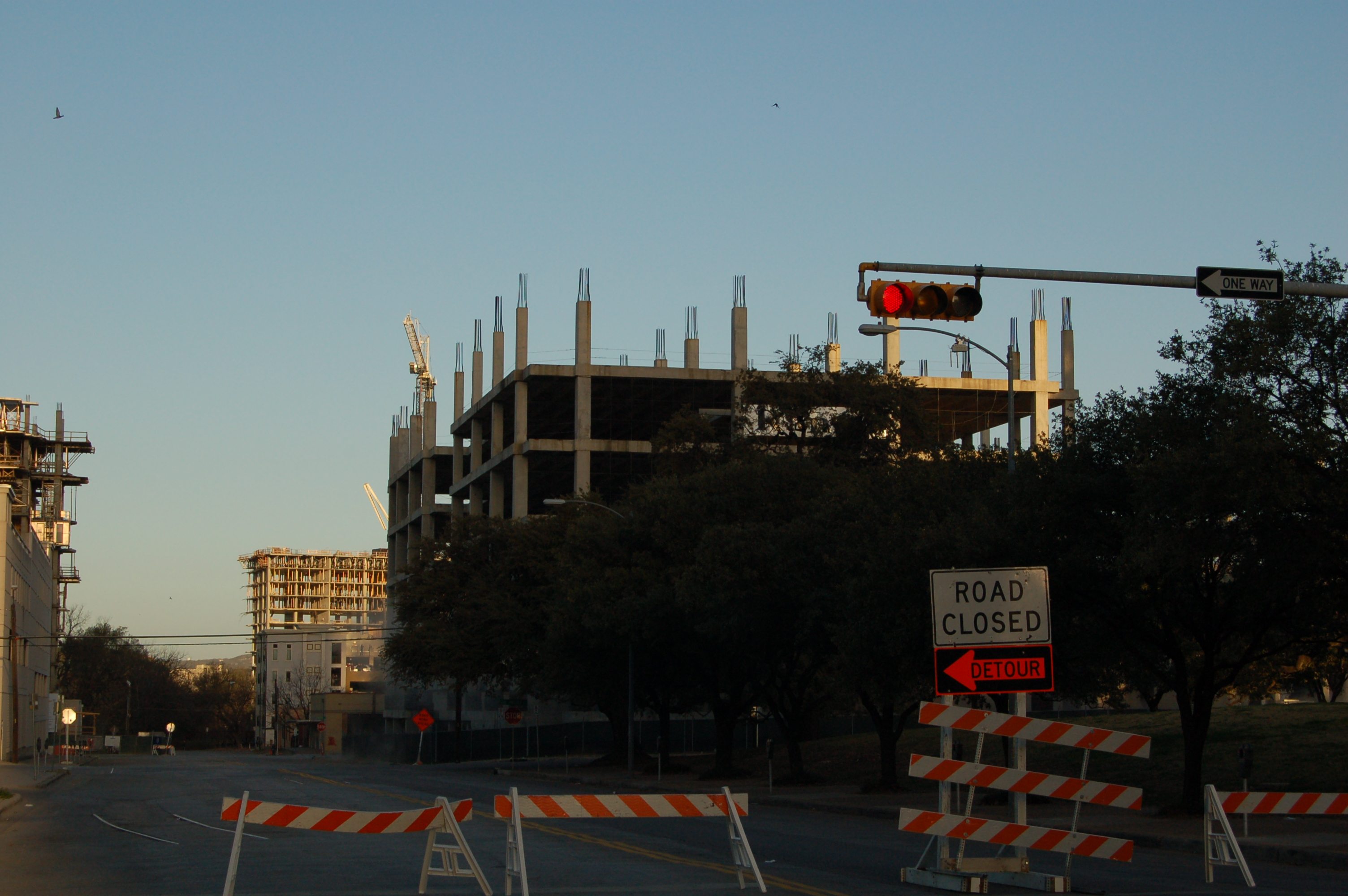
- Intel Shell building before destruction
- Interactive map of the Intel Shell area

General information
- Status: Demolished
- Location: 510 W 5th St. Austin, Texas, 400 West San Antonio Street, Austin, TX 78701, Austin, TX, United States
- Coordinates: 30.2681°N 97.7484°W
- Groundbreaking: September 2000
- Construction stopped: March 2001
- Demolished: February 25, 2007
- Cost: $124 million
- Owner: Intel

The Intel Shell was an unfinished Intel building located in Austin, Texas. It was imploded on February 25, 2007, and the Austin United States Courthouse now stands in its place.

== History ==
The city of Austin had given Intel a $15 million incentive package for the construction of the building, intended to be a ten story chip-design center, built for $124 million. According to The Austin Chronicle, "Winning the new Intel project symbolized all that was robust about Austin's economy and the revitalization of Downtown, in those high tech glory days."

Because of a slowing economy, construction stopped in March 2001, and the building was abandoned from March 2001 to 2004, becoming something of a symbol of the early 2000s recession. The abandoned building was a four story structure of steel and concrete decks. In 2004, the General Services Administration bought the site for the construction of a new courthouse.

The building was imploded on a Sunday morning in 2007. Hundreds of spectators cheered the demolition. Mayor Will Wynn had made attempts to preserve the building to be a mixed use condominium.

== Aftermath ==
After the demolition, an Austin man sold glass bottles with what he said was debris from the building, labeled "Intel Shell Inside". The construction of the Austin U.S. courthouse was completed in 2012.

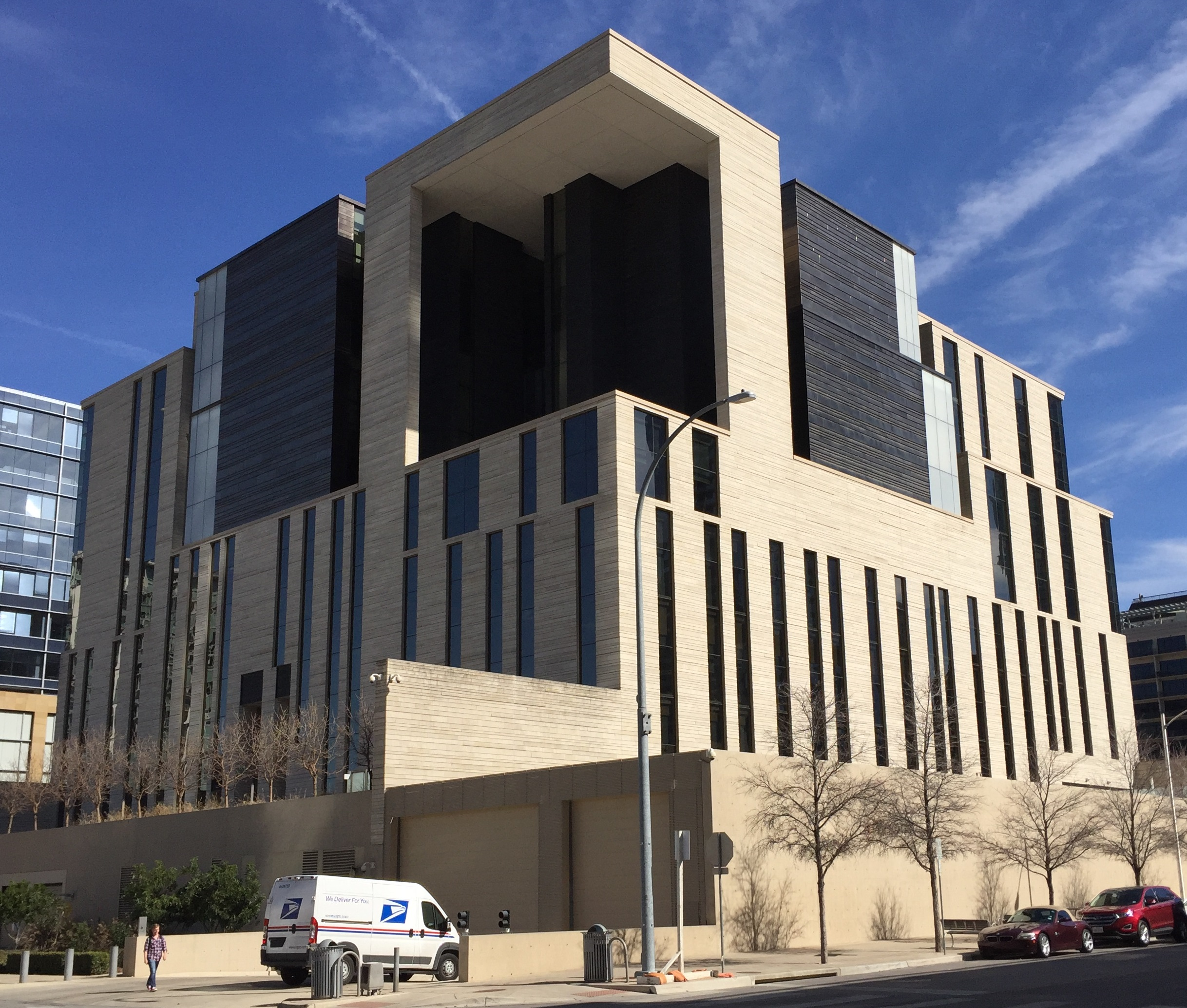
The Austin United States Courthouse in 2018
