= Americus micropolitan area =

Americus, GA Area
- Micropolitan Statistical Area
- Americus, GA Micropolitan Statistical Area
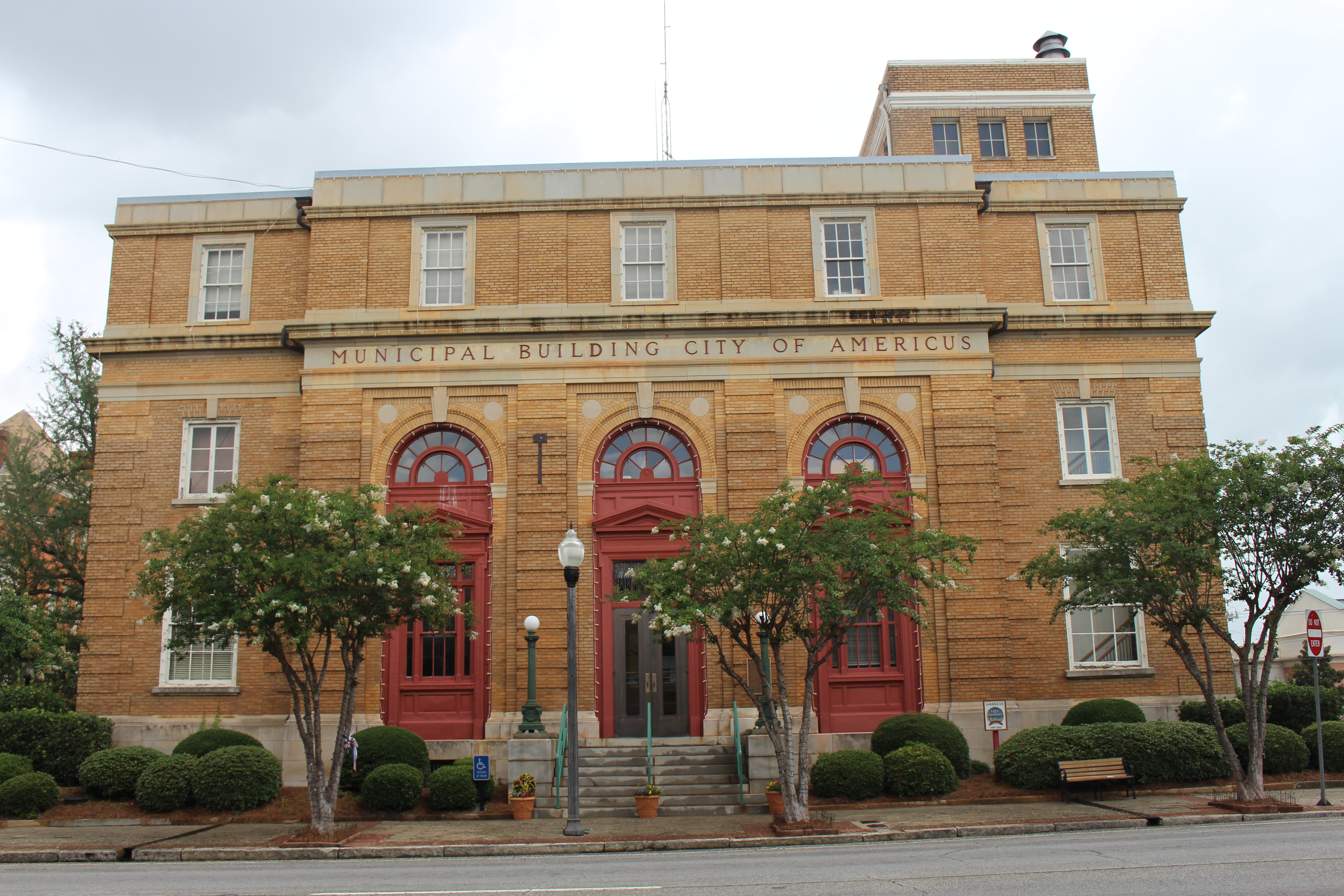
- Municipal Building in Americus
Interactive Map of Americus, GA μSA
City of Americus
Americus, GA μSA
- Country: United States
- State: Georgia
- Largest city: Americus
- Time zone: UTC−6 (EST)
  - Summer (DST): UTC−5 (EDT)

The Americus micropolitan statistical area, as defined by the United States Census Bureau, is an area consisting of two counties in Georgia, anchored by the city of Americus.

At the 2000 census, the μSA had a population of 36,966; on July 1, 2009 it was estimated at 36,409.

== Counties ==
- Schley
- Sumter

== Communities ==
- Incorporated places
  - Americus (principal city)
  - Andersonville
  - De Soto
  - Ellaville
  - Leslie
  - Plains
- Unincorporated places
  - Cobb
  - Murrays Crossroads
  - Archery

== Demographics ==
At the 2000 census, 36,966 people, 13,460 households and 9,542 families wereresiding within the μSA. The racial makeup of the area was 50.01% White, 47.22% African American, 0.29% Native American, 0.54% Asian, 1.3o% from other races, and 0.64% from two or more races. Hispanics or Latinos of any race were 2.65% of the population.

The median household income was $31,470 and the median family income was $35,797. Males had a median income of $28,534 versus $20,196 for females. The per capita income was $15,032.

== See also ==
- Georgia census statistical areas
