= Building 800–Austin Hall =

- U.S. National Register of Historic Places
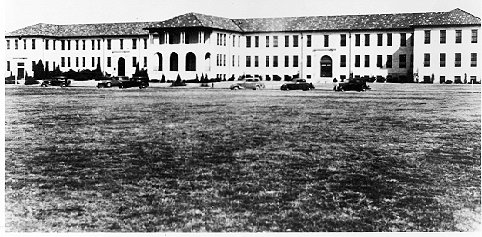

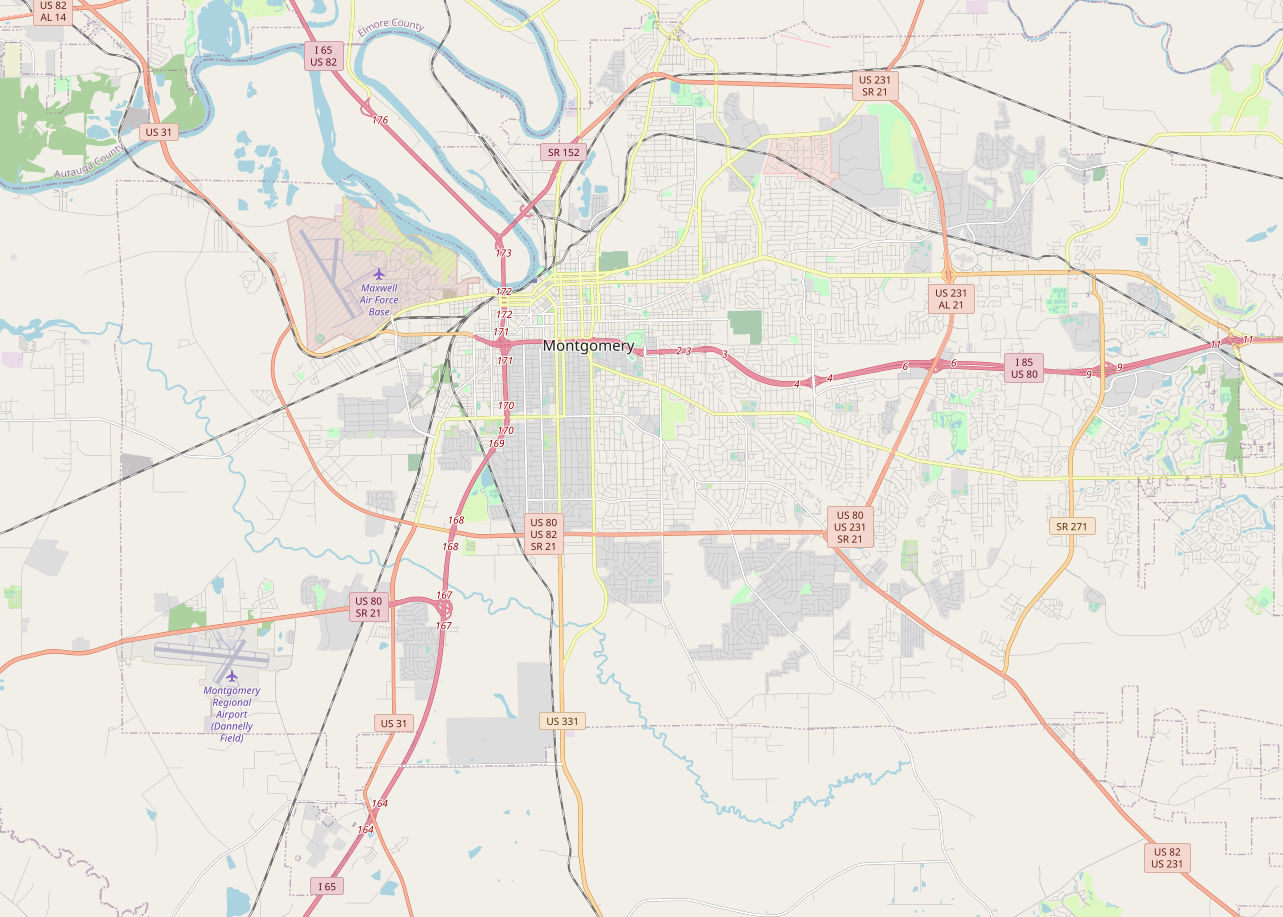
- Location within Montgomery, Alabama Location within Alabama Location within the United States
- Location: Montgomery, Alabama
- Coordinates: 32°22′42″N 86°21′3″W
- Built: 1930-31
- Architect: Algernon Blair (builder)
- Architectural style: Renaissance Revival
- NRHP reference No.: 87002178
- Added to NRHP: March 2, 1988

Building 800–Austin Hall is located in Montgomery, Alabama on the grounds of Maxwell Air Force Base.

== History ==
On January 25, 1930, President Herbert Hoover asked Congress to re-appropriate an additional $100,000 for the main school building for the Air Corps Tactical School at Maxwell Field. President Hoover's policy was to speed public works to offset unemployment. In February 1930 Congressman J. Lister Hill's resolution was passed in the House of Representatives, to add 80 acres (320,000 m^{2}) to Maxwell Field for expansion purposes. The bill carried an item for $100,000 for construction of a tactical school building with a total sum available of $136,000. The actual cost of the building ended up being $132,034.14.

=== The construction of Austin Hall ===
George B. Ford and Frederick Law Olmsted Jr. designed the overall layout of Maxwell for the Army Quartermaster Corps. Ford, an architect-trained city planner who had served as an adviser to the Army in the 1920s on all of its base construction projects, and had final approval of all post development plans between 1926 and 1930, used an approach that clustered similar functions together. This technique provided plenty of open space and gave each cluster a distinct appearance. Construction plans were approved by Chief of the Air Corps Maj. Gen. James Fechet and Congressman Hill for a school house of approximately 29,500 square feet (2,741 m^{2}) constructed of hollow tile and stucco, tile roof and walls with a white stucco finish. The expected operational date of the building was July 1931.

On September 15, 1930, Congressman Hill broke ground for the project. Rain forced abandonment of the outdoor ceremonies that were intended to mark the start of the project. Congressman Hill along with other national and local area dignitaries and post commander Major Weaver hurriedly transferred the ceremonies to the Maxwell Field officer's club. Congressman Hill, the principal speaker, announced at the ceremony that the project was to be completed in 300 days at an approximate cost of $119,273. Hill also announced that for the tactical school program there was $1,903,400 available of which $1,703,400 was to be spent on buildings. The remaining $200,000 was to be used for the appropriation of additional land. Hill added that he expected an additional $375,000 more for buildings with another $1,300,200 to be added soon afterward.

Algernon Blair is credited for being the architect and A.C. Samford was the contractor for the construction project. There were complaints about using imported labor; on April 4, 1931, Captain M. A. McFadden who was in charge of construction said at a local Rotary Club meeting that ninety percent of the labor employed in the construction was local labor. Montgomery area residents were understandably protective of all employment opportunities during this time period; the payroll of workers at Maxwell Field exceeded $2,000 daily.

=== Austin Hall opens ===
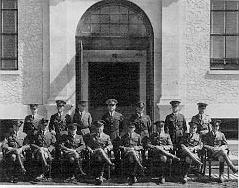
The first Air Corps Tactical School class at Maxwell Field in 1931

By August 28, 1931, sixty-four officers with spouses and other family members started to arrive at Maxwell Field in preparation of the grand opening of the school house. The school house was built in the Renaissance Revival style of architecture. Elements of this style were borrowed from fifteenth century Italian Renaissance merchant palaces and public buildings. The school house's hipped roof, corner quoins, and classical entrance gave the feeling of both formality and elegance.

On September 4, 1931, the school house (Building 800) was formally dedicated in honor of First Lieutenant Charles B. Austin. Austin was an instructor at the Air Corps Tactical School when the school was at Langley Field. Lieutenant Austin was born in Vermillion Grove, Illinois, on January 7, 1891. Austin had graduated from DePauw University in 1913. He was scholastically outstanding to the point where he was selected for a membership in Phi Beta Kappa. On October 11, 1917 he enlisted as a flying cadet and attended ground school as a cadet at the University of Illinois. He received his flight training at Rich and Ellington Fields in Houston, Texas. On March 30, 1918, Austin received his commission in the aviation section of the Signal Officers Reserve Corps and was promoted to first lieutenant in the regular army July 1, 1920. Austin served in England, Mitchel Field, New York, France Field, the Panama Canal Zone and Langley Field. First Lieutenant Austin served with distinction at Langley Field as an instructor at the Air Corps Tactical School and received a letter of commendation for his efforts. On July 27, 1928, Lieutenant Austin died following illness and a subsequent operation. Major John F. Curry, commandant of the Air Corps Tactical School, thought all personnel associated with the school would profit by the example Austin set.

=== Maxwell's continuous growth ===
On July 16, 1933, Congressman Lister Hill secured approval from the War Department for $1,650,075 for immediate spending at Maxwell Field. Hill's request was justified by increased enrollment at the Air Corps Tactical School and the desperate need for employment for the local Montgomery population. At the start of October 1933 bids opened for four construction projects that were to start immediately (1933-1934 construction at Maxwell Field employed an average of 500 plus workers). The contract for the addition to Austin Hall was the last to be resolved. Bidding opened for the contract to construct Austin Hall on January 16, 1934. On January 18, it was announced that the Algernon Blair Company of Montgomery had received the contract. Construction started on the project after the Air Corps Tactical School 1933-34 session closed in June. Blair made all of his company assets available to ensure the project was finished by the fall.

On September 5, Austin Hall was officially turned over to the Army Air Corps by the Algernon Blair Company; even though some areas of the building had been in use since August 31. The addition more than doubled the size of the original building to 60,640 square feet (5,634 m^{2}). The final cost for the construction for the additions to the south and front ends of the original structure was $107,627. Because of the additions to Austin Hall it would not only include classrooms but also be the new staff headquarters for the ACTS. The additions included executive offices, classrooms and assembly halls; a library was located in the extreme southern tip of the building.

== Modern-day Austin Hall ==
As of July 8, 1940, Austin Hall was home to the headquarters of the Southeast Air Corps Training Center. The Southeast Air Corps Training Center was responsible for all pilot, navigator and bombardier training in the southeast. At one time during World War II the headquarters in Austin Hall controlled 30 plus major installations and 23 war service training organizations. Command jurisdiction for the Southeast Air Corps Training Center extended from Maine to Florida and from the Atlantic coast to the Mississippi River valley. By the end of World War II more than 100,000 aviation cadets had received training from the Southeast Air Corps Training Center.

=== Historical status ===
On April 2, 1988, Austin Hall was placed on the National Register of Historic Places. The period of significance for the placement of Austin Hall on the register was 1925–1949. The historical significance of Austin Hall's placement on the register was the movement of the ACTS as well as Austin Hall's rich history through 1949. Moreover, the Algernon Blair Company and Samford Brother's Inc. involvement for Architecture/Engineering are noted for their significant effort.
