= Quentin Fulks =

American political strategist

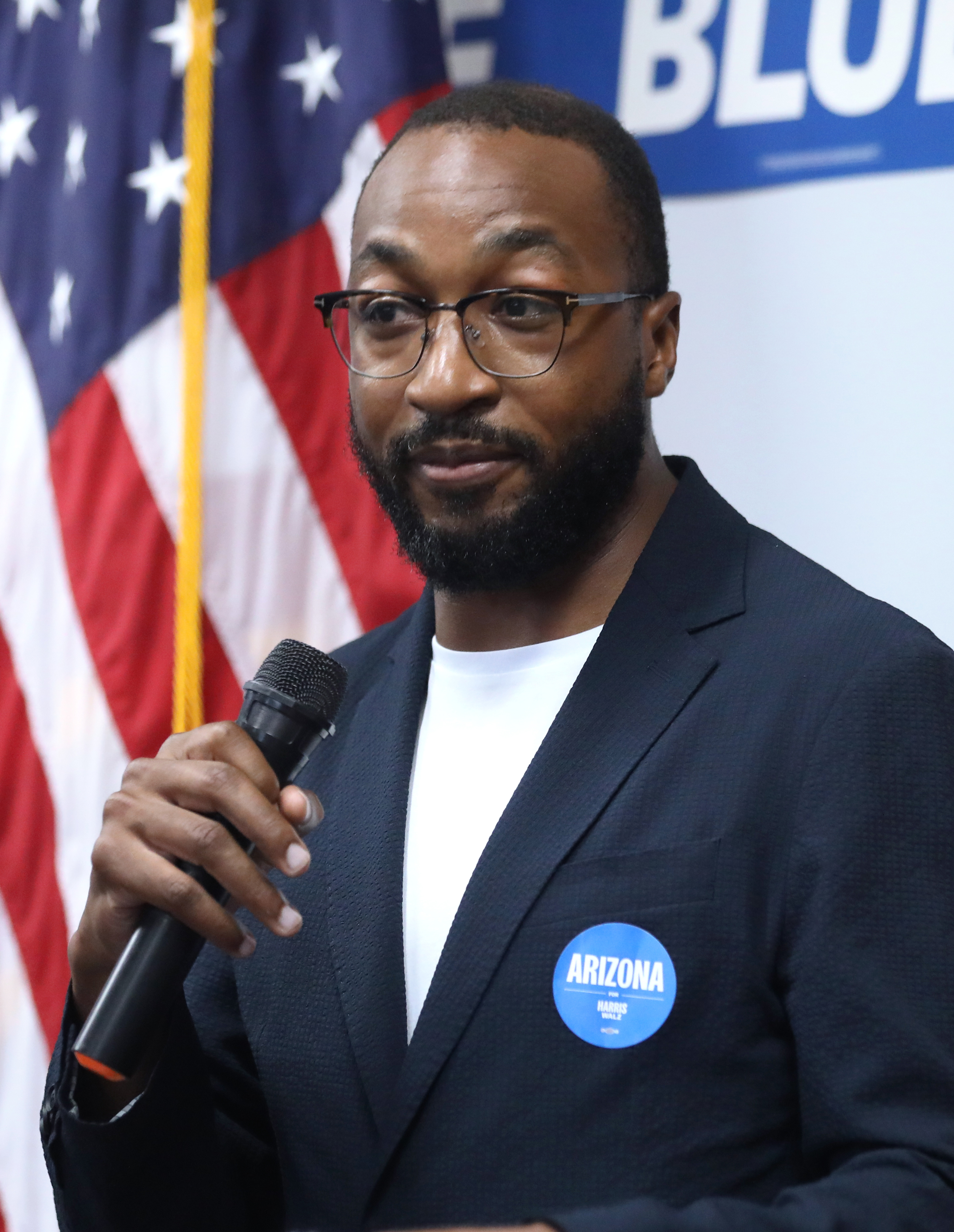
- Fulks in 2024
- Education: Georgia Southwestern State University (BA); American University (MPA)
- Occupation: Campaign manager
- Political party: Democratic

Quentin Fulks is an American former campaign manager and former political strategist who is a fellow at the Harvard Institute of Politics. He was the principal deputy campaign manager of the Kamala Harris 2024 presidential campaign and reportedly led the campaign's advertising program. Fulks was previously the principal deputy campaign manager of the Joe Biden 2024 presidential campaign.

== Early life ==
Fulks is from Ellaville, Georgia. He graduated from Schley Middle High School in 2008. Fulks was a split end and defensive back on the varsity football team. In 2012, he completed a bachelor's degree in political science with a minor in sociology at Georgia Southwestern State University. He served as the co-founder and president of its pre-law society. Fulks earned a M.A. from the American University School of Public Affairs in 2015.

== Career ==
In June 2014, Fulks joined Priorities USA Action as a political content manager. He interned for U.S. representative Steny Hoyer.

Fulks served as the deputy to campaign manager Anne Caprara during governor J. B. Pritzker's election campaign in the 2018 Illinois gubernatorial election. Fulks was the manager of Senator Raphael Warnock's reelection campaign during the 2022 United States Senate election in Georgia. Warnock was the first Democrat to win re-election to the Senate in Georgia since Sam Nunn in 1990 and the first Deep South Democrat to win re-election since former Louisiana Senator Mary Landrieu in 2008.

Fulks is a fellow at the Harvard Institute of Politics. On April 25, 2023, Julie Chávez Rodriguez and Fulks were named as campaign manager and principal deputy campaign manager respectively of the Joe Biden 2024 presidential campaign. This was the first time a Latina and an African American man were selected to run the campaign of an incumbent president. He was Harris's principal deputy campaign manager during her 2024 presidential campaign. Fulks took over leadership of the campaign's advertising program, replacing Mike Donilon.
