= Cobb, Georgia =

- Unincorporated community
- Location within the state of Georgia
- Coordinates: 31°57′32.9″N 83°58′54.8″W
- Country: United States
- State: Georgia
- County: Sumter County
- Time zone: UTC-5 (EST)
  - Summer (DST): UTC-4 (EDT)
- ZIP code: 31735

Cobb is an unincorporated community in Sumter County, Georgia, United States. Cobb is connected with the residents of Lake Blackshear and is the location of the Lake Blackshear Volunteer Fire Department.

The community is part of the Americus Micropolitan Statistical Area.
