= United States Post Office (Milan, Tennessee) =

- U.S. Post Office
- U.S. National Register of Historic Places
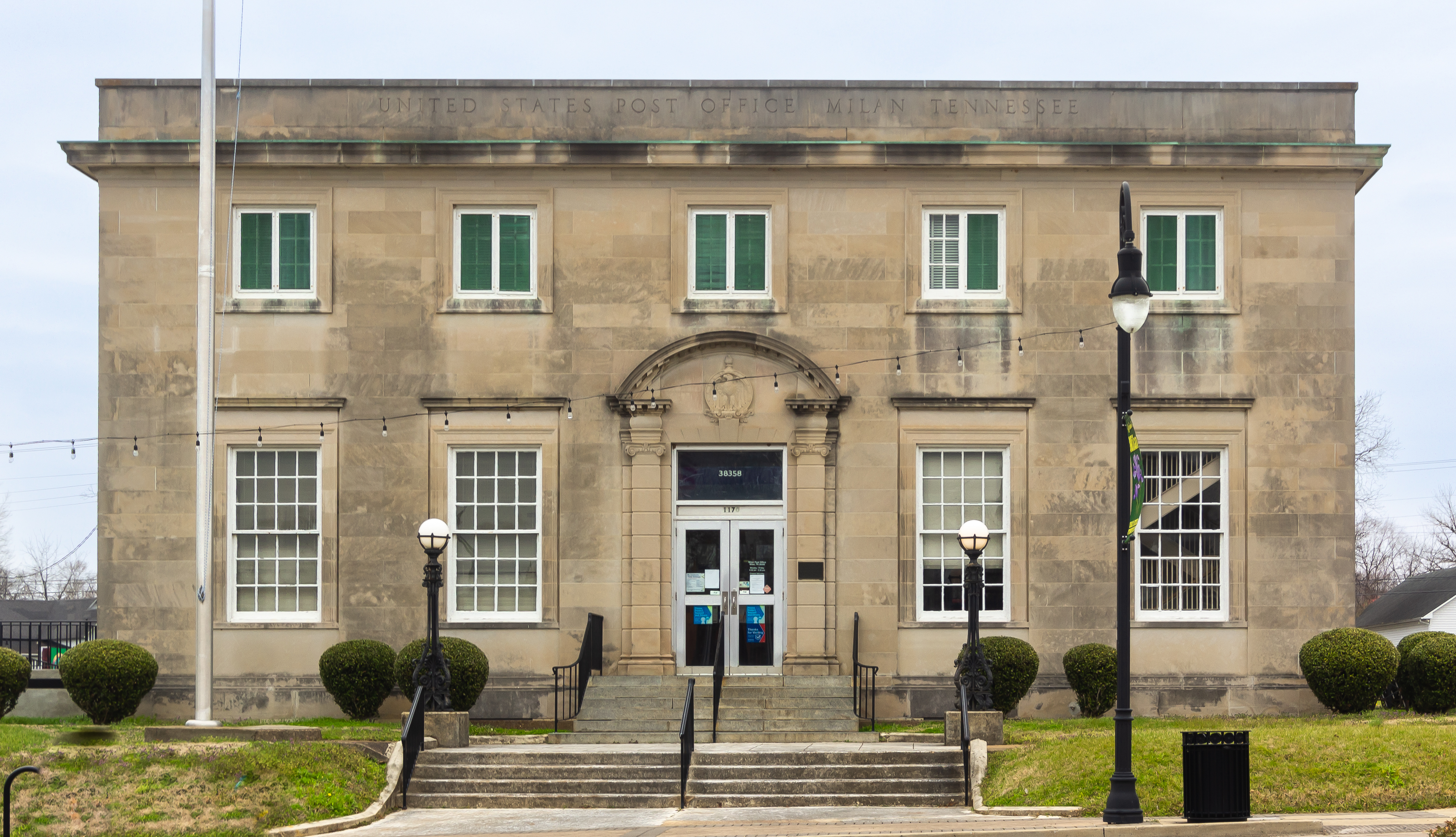
- Location: 382 S. Main St., Milan, Tennessee
- Coordinates: 35°55′02″N 88°45′51″W
- Area: 0.5 acres (0.20 ha)
- Built: 1936
- Built by: Algernon Blair
- Architect: Louis A. Simon
- Architectural style: Classical Revival
- NRHP reference No.: 87001169
- Added to NRHP: July 9, 1987

The U.S. Post Office in Milan, Tennessee, located at 382 S. Main St., was built in 1936. It was listed on the National Register of Historic Places in 1987.

Design credit is given to Louis A. Simon. The building was deemed notable as "a fine example of the simplified Classical Revival design popular for government buildings during the 1930s."
