= O. Henry Hall =

- U.S. Post Office and Federal Building
- U.S. National Register of Historic Places
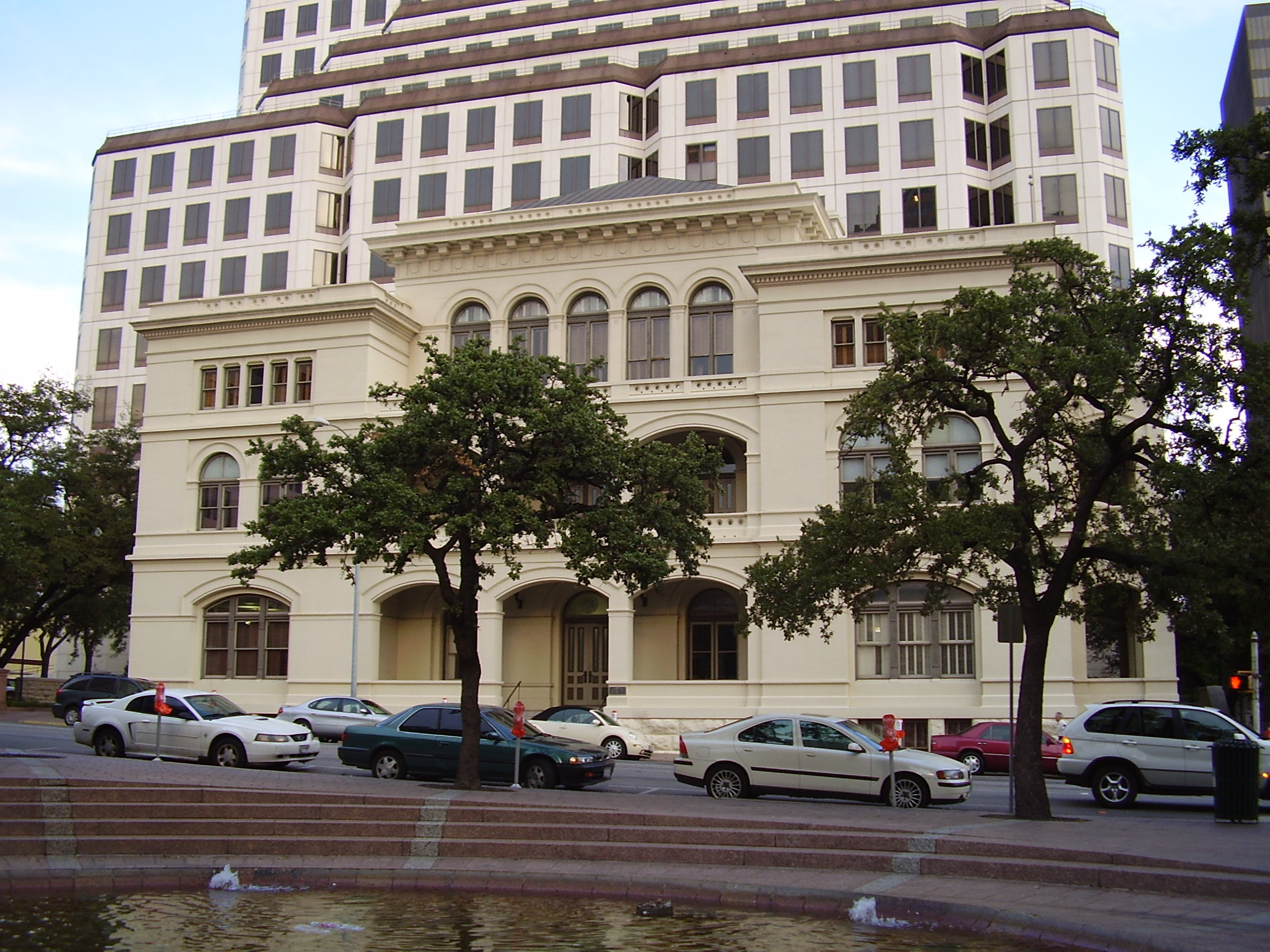
- O. Henry Hall as it appeared in 2005

- Location within Texas Location within the United States
- Location: 601 Colorado Street, Austin, Texas
- Coordinates: 30°16′7″N 97°44′36″W
- Area: 0.1 acres (0.040 ha)
- Built: 1879
- Architect: James G. Hill
- Architectural style: Renaissance
- NRHP reference No.: 70000771
- Added to NRHP: August 25, 1970

O. Henry Hall, formerly known as the U.S. Post Office and Federal Building, is a historic courthouse and post office in Austin, Texas, United States. It is located within the Sixth Street Historic District in Downtown Austin. O. Henry Hall serves as the administrative headquarters of the Texas State University System (TSUS), and until 2017 served as the University of Texas System headquarters.

== History ==
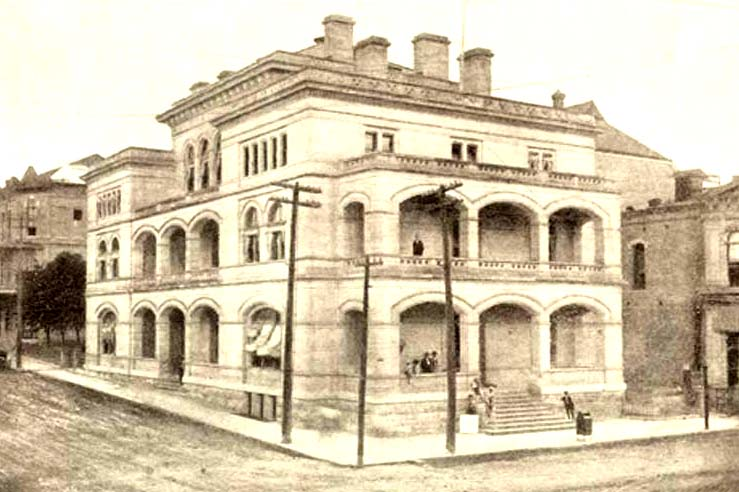
The United States Court House and Post Office in Austin Texas in 1901

Architect James G. Hill designed the building, and it was constructed partially under the supervision of architect Abner Cook. The courthouse was completed in 1879 at a cost of $200,000.

The United States District Court for the Western District of Texas met there from then until 1936. One of its most noted trials occurred in February 1898, when William Sidney Porter – the man who later became known under the pen name of O. Henry – was tried and convicted of embezzlement.

It was acquired by the University of Texas System in 1968 and renamed for the author, who had previously resided nearby in what is now officially called the William Sidney Porter House, but is better known as the O. Henry House. The building was listed on the National Register of Historic Places on August 25, 1970. It previously served as the administrative headquarters of that system.

TSUS purchased O. Henry Hall in 2015 for $8.2 million. The UT System leased it and continued using it as its administrative headquarters prior to the 2017 completion of the UT System's current headquarters. TSUS did the move so it could have a single administrative office in Downtown; it formerly occupied three different downtown buildings operated by the state government.

== See also ==
- List of United States federal courthouses in Texas
