= Murrays Crossroads, Georgia =

Murrays Crossroads
- Unincorporated community
- Location within the state of Georgia Murrays Crossroads (the United States)
- Coordinates: 32°19′16″N 84°17′40″W
- Country: United States
- State: Georgia
- County: Schley
- Elevation: 440 ft (130 m)
- Time zone: UTC-5 (Eastern (EST))
  - Summer (DST): UTC-4 (EDT)
- GNIS feature ID: 326414

Murrays Crossroads (also Murray, Murrays Cross Roads, and Poindexter) was an unincorporated community in Schley County, Georgia, United States. It was located at the intersection of U.S. Route 19 with State Route 240, to the north of the city of Ellaville, the county seat of Schley County. The elevation of the location is 440 feet (134 m). In the late 19th century it was a "prosperous country settlement", which had its own post office by 1884. Thomas E. Watson gave a speech at Murray's Crossroads in 1893. In 1959, it was referred to as a "town". By 2021, however, it was referred to as a "past example" of a rural community.

The community is part of the Americus Micropolitan Statistical Area.
