= United States Customhouse (Houston) =

Historic building in Houston, Texas, U.S.

- U.S. Customhouse
- U.S. National Register of Historic Places
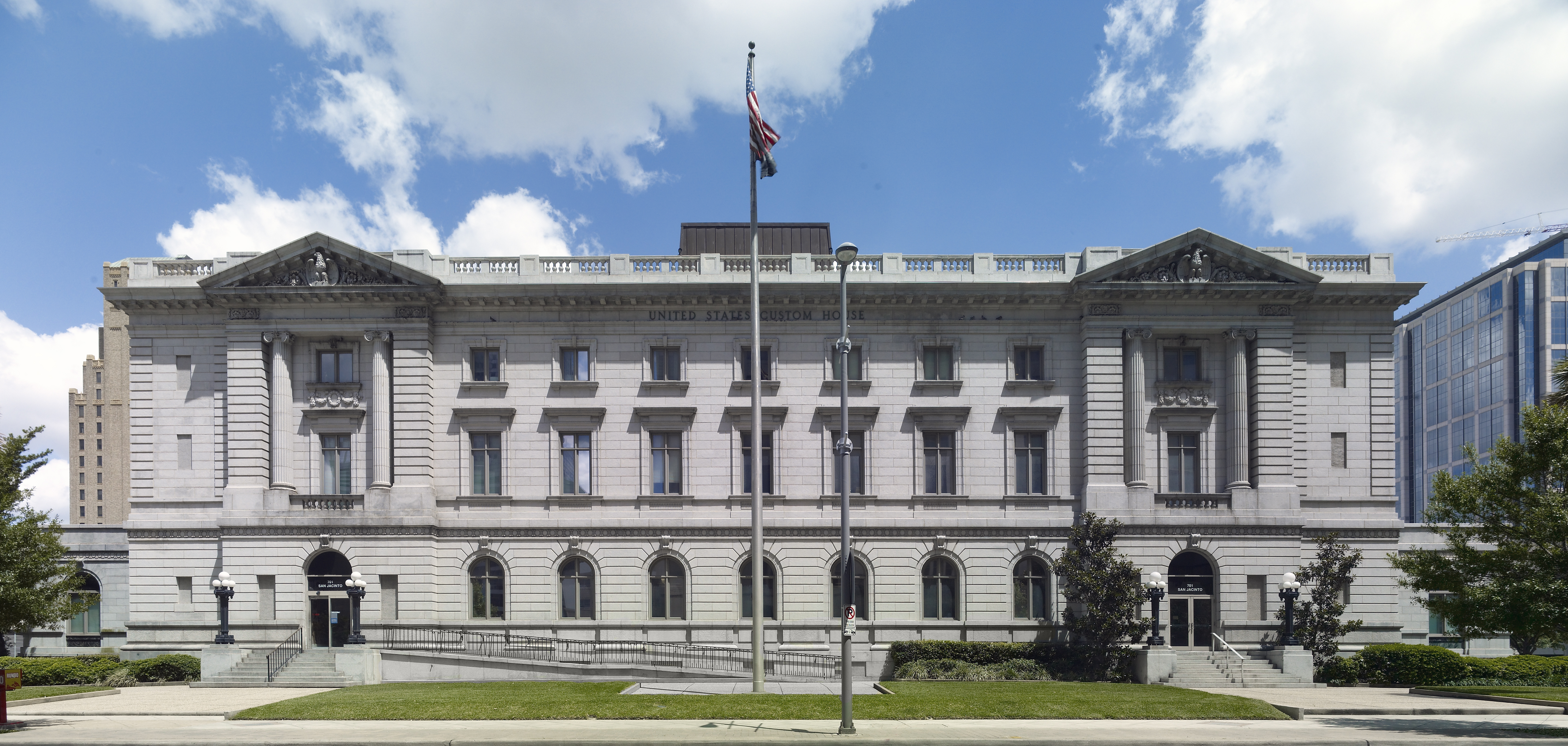

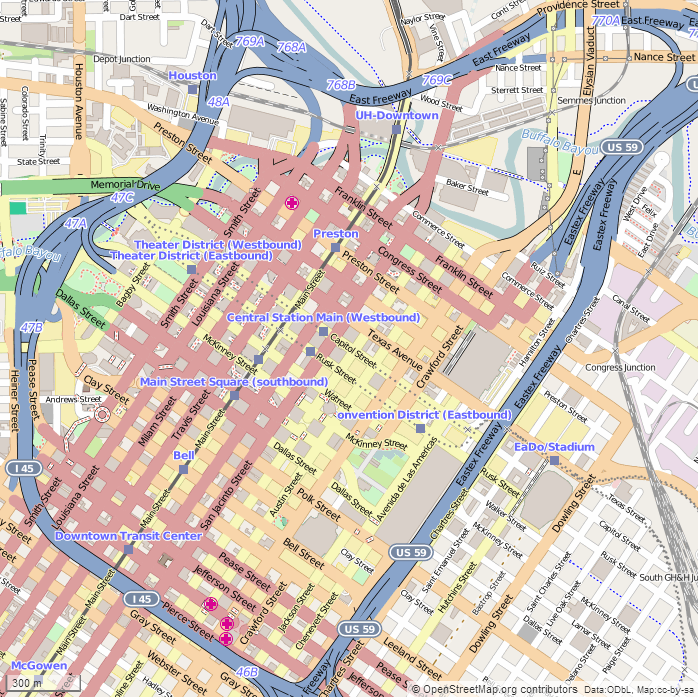
- Location within Houston Downtown Location within Texas Location within the United States
- Location: 701 San Jacinto St., Houston, Texas
- Coordinates: 29°45′26″N 95°21′40″W
- Area: 2 acres (0.81 ha)
- Built: 1907
- Architect: James Knox Taylor
- Architectural style: Second Renaissance Revival
- NRHP reference No.: 74002075
- Added to NRHP: August 28, 1974

The United States Customhouse is a historic custom house located at Houston in Harris County, Texas.

== Building history ==
The U.S. Custom House occupies an entire block in the central business district of Houston, Texas. It was built as a post office and courthouse between 1907 and 1911 and later converted to use as the custom house. During this period, urban post offices often shared a building with courts and other federal offices. Houston competed unsuccessfully with Galveston during the latter portion of the 19th century, until the 1900 hurricane, the deadliest natural disaster in United States history, devastated Galveston. The risk to businesses, particularly shipping, caused many companies to move their facilities to the safer, sheltered port of Houston. By 1910, seventeen railroads moved passengers and freight to and from Houston. As Houston grew, the demand for postal facilities and other federal services increased and a new building to house them was needed.

The Supervising Architect of the Treasury James Knox Taylor designed the building in the Second Renaissance Revival style. Federal buildings constructed during this era used classical revival styles almost exclusively. Taylor's philosophy was that public buildings should be pleasant to look at, convey dignity appropriate to the federal government, and that they should be designed to permit a utilitarian interior arrangement. Construction began in 1907, and on December 1, 1911, thousands of Houstonians came to tour the building during its grand opening celebration.

The building was originally constructed to house the federal district court, a post office, and other federal offices. The increasing number of federal offices in Houston necessitated the 1931 addition. The courthouse operated in the building until 1962, the same year that the post office vacated a portion of the space originally allocated to it. Renovation of those spaces prepared them for other uses. The building has been listed in the National Register of Historic Places since 1974.

When this building was constructed, it was the only monumental Second Renaissance Revival building in Houston and one of the larger downtown buildings. It replaced a three-story polychromatic Moorish post office built in 1889, which had been unlike any other building in Houston at the time. Today, especially to the south, this building is surrounded by modern skyscrapers.

== Architecture ==
The U.S. Custom House in Houston occupies the city block bounded by San Jacinto, Carolina, Capital, and Rusk streets, with the facade facing northwest onto San Jacinto Street. It is a well-executed example of the Second Renaissance Revival architectural style, as evident in the arched first-story windows, rusticated stonework with deep joints, emphasis on the horizontal plane, and the stately appearance of the building. The classical origins of the style are manifested in the symmetry of the building and the shapes and motifs used to embellish both the exterior and interior. The main portion of the building has three stories with a full basement and the wings have four stories. The building has a copper Mansard roof, and interior light wells flank the area that began as the two-story courtroom.

Exterior cladding on the building is primarily granite, though a portion of the east elevation is clad in brick. The horizontal rustication of the first floor, entry bays, and quoins is characteristic of the architectural style. There are eleven bays in the main, or west, elevation. The T-shaped building has single-story wings on either side of the base of the T. These wings, and the wings that create the T shape, are all part of the 1931 addition. The addition omitted the first floor rustication, but is otherwise consistent with the architectural style of the original building. Each of the first floor windows and the doors are arched. There are belt courses between the first and second stories, and above the third-story windows. An elaborate entablature, including a dentil molding, cornice, medallions, and a simple frieze, encircles the building, topped by a decorative parapet that includes both a pedestal and balustrade.

The main entry doors are in the west elevation, in the second and tenth bays. Stone steps provide access to the entrances, each of which is flanked by freestanding ornamental metal lampposts. Each entrance projects outward from the vertical surface of the building. Above each door is a pair of ionic order columns joined by a decorative balustrade. Between each of the two pairs of columns are two windows separated by an oval cartouche. A triangular pediment with an eagle signifies that this is a federal building. Floral designs within the triangle top each of these entries.

Constructed as a post office and courthouse, the building originally included postal facilities on the first floor, offices around the perimeter of the upper floors, and a central two-story courtroom. The south and west corridors on the first floor both retain their original terrazzo and gray marble floors. The lobby features terrazzo floors, marble baseboards, tongue and groove wood paneling, and plasterwork above the windows and on the beams with raised gold-painted laurel wreaths and geometric patterns. The current post office occupies only a portion of the space originally designed for it. The wood floor and vaults are original, as are some doors and windows leading to internal corridors. The second and third floor hallways retain their terrazzo and marble flooring. When use of the building as a courthouse ceased, the courtroom was converted into offices. Offices and other internal spaces were modified as their uses changed.

== History ==
- 1907-1911: Building constructed
- 1931: Addition constructed
- 1962-1963: Renovation of building when U.S. Courts and post office relocate
- 1974: Building listed in National Register of Historic Places

== Building facts ==
- Location: 701 San Jacinto Street
- Architects: James Knox Taylor; James A. Wetmore
- Construction Dates: 1907–1911; 1931
- Architectural Style: Second Renaissance Revival
- Landmark Status: Listed in the National Register of Historic Places
- Primary Materials: Limestone, brick, and granite
- Prominent Features: Elaborate frieze; Classical pediments featuring granite eagles; Grey terrazzo marble floor, coffered ceiling
