= Schley County, Georgia =

County in Georgia, United States

- County
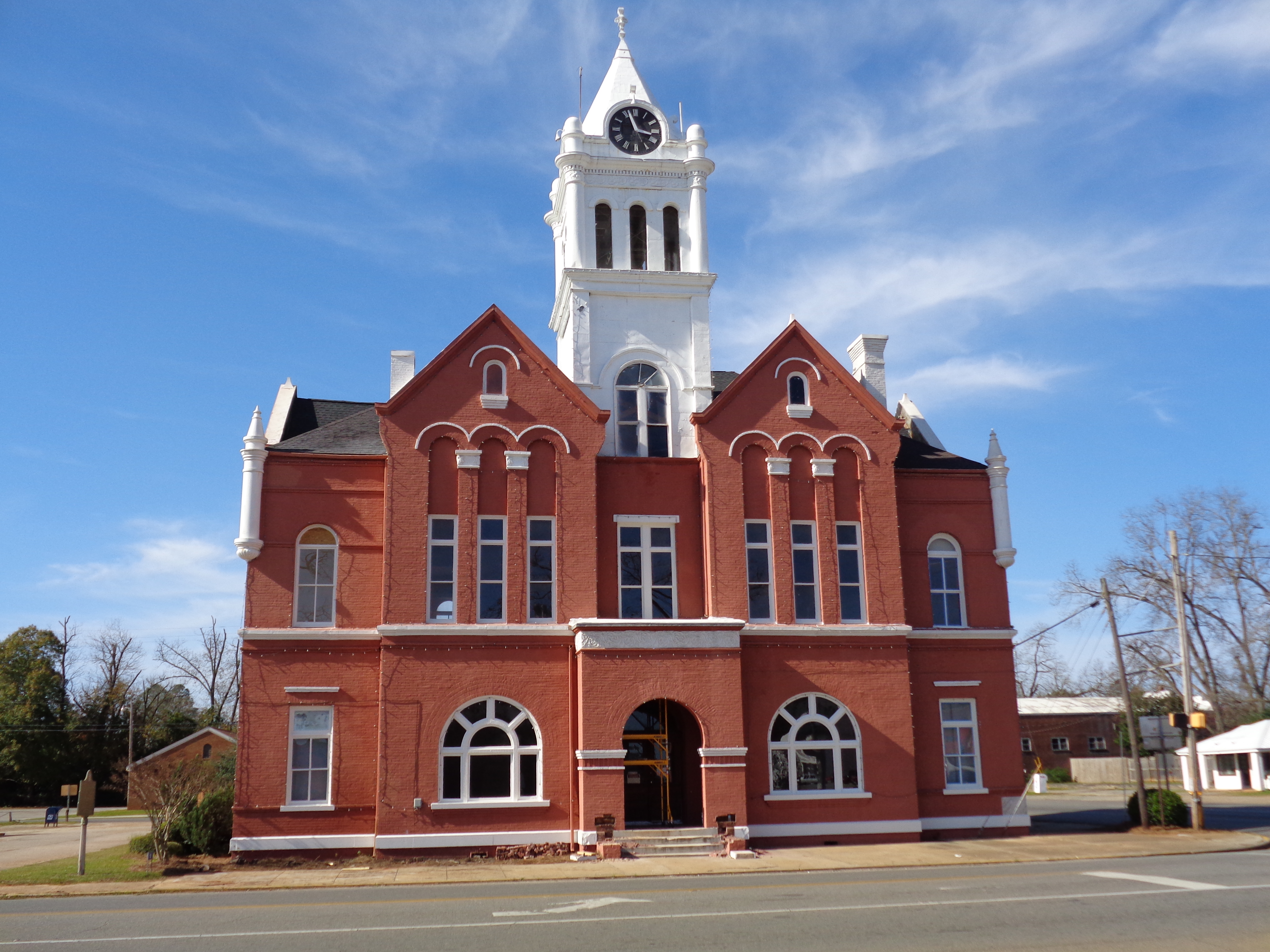
- Schley County Courthouse in Ellaville

- Location within the U.S. state of Georgia
- Coordinates: 32°16′00″N 84°17′59″W
- Country: United States
- State: Georgia
- Founded: December 22, 1857; 168 years ago
- Named for: William Schley
- Seat: Ellaville
- Largest city: Ellaville

Area
  - Total: 168 sq mi (440 km^{2})
  - Land: 167 sq mi (430 km^{2})
  - Water: 0.9 sq mi (2.3 km^{2}) 0.5%

Population (2020)
  - Total: 4,547
  - Estimate (2025): 4,593 ▲
  - Density: 27/sq mi (10/km^{2})
- Time zone: UTC−5 (Eastern)
  - Summer (DST): UTC−4 (EDT)
- Congressional district: 2nd
- Website: schleycountyga.us

Schley County (/slaɪ/ SLY) is a county located in the west-central portion of the U.S. state of Georgia. As of the 2020 U.S. census, its population was 4,547. The county seat is Ellaville.

Schley County is part of the Americus, GA micropolitan statistical area. It is named in honor of Governor William Schley.

== History ==
The county was created by an act of the Georgia General Assembly on December 22, 1857, and is named for William Schley, United States Representative and thirty-sixth governor of Georgia.

The first county courthouse was built in 1858. The present Schley County Courthouse dates from 1899.

== Geography ==
According to the U.S. Census Bureau, the county has a total area of 168 square miles (440 km^{2}), of which 167 square miles (430 km^{2}) is land and 0.9 square miles (2.3 km^{2}) (0.5%) is water.

The central portion of Schley County, roughly north of Ellaville, is located in the Middle Flint River sub-basin of the ACF River Basin (Apalachicola-Chattahoochee-Flint River Basin). The very northern border area of the county is located in the Upper Flint River sub-basin of the same ACF River Basin. The southwestern portion of Schley County, southwest of Ellaville, is located in the Kinchafoonee-Muckalee sub-basin of the same larger ACF River Basin.

=== Major highways ===
- U.S. Route 19 / State Route 3
- State Route 26
- State Route 153
- State Route 228
- State Route 240
- State Route 271

=== Adjacent counties ===
- Taylor County (north)
- Macon County (east)
- Sumter County (south)
- Marion County (west)

== Communities ==
=== City ===
- Ellaville (county seat)

=== Unincorporated communities ===
- La Crosse
- Murrays Crossroads

== Demographics ==
Historical population
Census	Pop.	Note	%±
1860	4,633		—
1870	5,129		10.7%
1880	5,302		3.4%
1890	5,443		2.7%
1900	5,499		1.0%
1910	5,213		−5.2%
1920	5,243		0.6%
1930	5,347		2.0%
1940	5,033		−5.9%
1950	4,036		−19.8%
1960	3,256		−19.3%
1970	3,097		−4.9%
1980	3,433		10.8%
1990	3,588		4.5%
2000	3,766		5.0%
2010	5,010		33.0%
2020	4,547		−9.2%
2025 (est.)	4,593	▲	1.0%
U.S. Decennial Census; 1790-1880 1890-1910; 1920-1930 1930-1940; 1940-1950 1960-1980; 1980-2000 2010

=== Racial and ethnic composition ===
Schley County, Georgia – Racial and ethnic composition Note: the US Census treats Hispanic/Latino as an ethnic category. This table excludes Latinos from the racial categories and assigns them to a separate category. Hispanics/Latinos may be of any race.
Race / Ethnicity (NH = Non-Hispanic)	Pop 1980	Pop 1990	Pop 2000	Pop 2010	Pop 2020	% 1980	% 1990	% 2000	% 2010	% 2020
White alone (NH)	2,135	2,308	2,462	3,612	3,357	62.19%	64.33%	65.37%	72.10%	73.83%
Black or African American alone (NH)	1,208	1,221	1,169	1,167	863	35.19%	34.03%	31.04%	23.29%	18.98%
Native American or Alaska Native alone (NH)	0	2	8	2	4	0.00%	0.06%	0.21%	0.04%	0.09%
Asian alone (NH)	0	0	3	36	20	0.00%	0.00%	0.08%	0.72%	0.44%
Native Hawaiian or Pacific Islander alone (NH)	x	x	0	0	2	x	x	0.00%	0.00%	0.04%
Other race alone (NH)	0	2	0	0	7	0.00%	0.06%	0.00%	0.00%	0.15%
Mixed race or Multiracial (NH)	x	x	35	32	119	x	x	0.93%	0.64%	2.62%
Hispanic or Latino (any race)	90	55	89	161	175	2.62%	1.53%	2.36%	3.21%	3.85%
Total	3,433	3,588	3,766	5,010	4,547	100.00%	100.00%	100.00%	100.00%	100.00%

=== 2020 census ===
As of the 2020 census, there were 4,547 people, 1,753 households, and 1,452 families residing in the county. The median age was 39.1 years. 26.8% of residents were under the age of 18 and 16.1% of residents were 65 years of age or older. For every 100 females there were 93.7 males, and for every 100 females age 18 and over there were 90.3 males age 18 and over. 0.0% of residents lived in urban areas, while 100.0% lived in rural areas.

The racial makeup of the county was 75.3% White, 19.3% Black or African American, 0.1% American Indian and Alaska Native, 0.4% Asian, 0.0% Native Hawaiian and Pacific Islander, 1.1% from some other race, and 3.7% from two or more races. Hispanic or Latino residents of any race comprised 3.8% of the population.

Of the 1,753 households in the county, 37.8% had children under the age of 18 living with them and 27.3% had a female householder with no spouse or partner present. About 25.8% of all households were made up of individuals and 11.5% had someone living alone who was 65 years of age or older.

There were 1,961 housing units, of which 10.6% were vacant. Among occupied housing units, 73.0% were owner-occupied and 27.0% were renter-occupied. The homeowner vacancy rate was 0.5% and the rental vacancy rate was 7.4%.

== Politics ==
As of the 2020s, Schley County is a Republican stronghold, voting 81% for Donald Trump in 2024. For elections to the United States House of Representatives, Schley County is part of Georgia's 2nd congressional district, currently represented by Sanford Bishop. For elections to the Georgia State Senate, Schley County is part of District 15. For elections to the Georgia House of Representatives, Schley County is part of District 151.

United States presidential election results for Schley County, Georgia
Year	Republican		Democratic		Third party(ies)	
Year	No.	%	No.	%	No.	%
1912	19	8.09%	213	90.64%	3	1.28%
1916	35	13.51%	222	85.71%	2	0.77%
1920	53	18.40%	235	81.60%	0	0.00%
1924	12	4.27%	266	94.66%	3	1.07%
1928	77	19.01%	328	80.99%	0	0.00%
1932	8	1.96%	398	97.55%	2	0.49%
1936	43	9.31%	419	90.69%	0	0.00%
1940	69	12.73%	471	86.90%	2	0.37%
1944	37	10.11%	329	89.89%	0	0.00%
1948	43	11.47%	257	68.53%	75	20.00%
1952	148	25.34%	436	74.66%	0	0.00%
1956	117	20.97%	441	79.03%	0	0.00%
1960	138	22.81%	467	77.19%	0	0.00%
1964	577	60.48%	377	39.52%	0	0.00%
1968	164	15.02%	309	28.30%	619	56.68%
1972	694	81.07%	162	18.93%	0	0.00%
1976	268	25.50%	783	74.50%	0	0.00%
1980	453	41.75%	613	56.50%	19	1.75%
1984	614	60.37%	403	39.63%	0	0.00%
1988	635	58.91%	439	40.72%	4	0.37%
1992	511	39.43%	601	46.37%	184	14.20%
1996	470	40.17%	576	49.23%	124	10.60%
2000	706	60.03%	460	39.12%	10	0.85%
2004	1,063	69.39%	464	30.29%	5	0.33%
2008	1,252	72.00%	479	27.54%	8	0.46%
2012	1,286	73.40%	448	25.57%	18	1.03%
2016	1,472	76.55%	401	20.85%	50	2.60%
2020	1,800	79.12%	462	20.31%	13	0.57%
2024	1,970	81.14%	453	18.66%	5	0.21%

United States Senate election results for Schley County, Georgia2
Year	Republican		Democratic		Third party(ies)	
Year	No.	%	No.	%	No.	%
2020	1,783	79.03%	439	19.46%	34	1.51%
2020	1,623	78.86%	435	21.14%	0	0.00%

United States Senate election results for Schley County, Georgia3
Year	Republican		Democratic		Third party(ies)	
Year	No.	%	No.	%	No.	%
2020	863	38.80%	315	14.16%	1,046	47.03%
2020	1,800	79.58%	462	20.42%	0	0.00%
2022	1,467	78.45%	384	20.53%	19	1.02%
2022	1,380	79.95%	346	20.05%	0	0.00%

Georgia Gubernatorial election results for Schley County
Year	Republican		Democratic		Third party(ies)	
Year	No.	%	No.	%	No.	%
2022	1,526	81.34%	339	18.07%	11	0.59%

== Education ==
Public education is provided by the Schley County School District. Schools include the Schley County Elementary School and Schley Middle High School.

== See also ==
- National Register of Historic Places listings in Schley County, Georgia
- Hanging of Charles Blackman
- List of counties in Georgia
