= Ellaville, Georgia =

- City
- Oglethorpe Street in Ellaville

- Location in Schley County and the state of Georgia
- Coordinates: 32°14′20″N 84°18′34″W
- Country: United States
- State: Georgia
- County: Schley

Area
  - Total: 3.17 sq mi (8.22 km^{2})
  - Land: 3.16 sq mi (8.19 km^{2})
  - Water: 0.015 sq mi (0.04 km^{2})
- Elevation: 571 ft (174 m)

Population (2020)
  - Total: 1,595
  - Density: 504.7/sq mi (194.86/km^{2})
- Time zone: UTC-5 (Eastern (EST))
  - Summer (DST): UTC-4 (EDT)
- ZIP code: 31806
- Area code: 229
- FIPS code: 13-26980
- GNIS feature ID: 0355674
- Website: www.ellavillega.org

Ellaville is a city in Schley County, Georgia, United States. As of the 2020 census, Ellaville had a population of 1,595. The city is the county seat of Schley County.

Ellaville is part of the Americus micropolitan statistical area.

== History ==
A town named Pond Town was established in 1812 along the stage coach in the area that is now the location of the Ellaville City Cemetery. The area was then part of the lands belonging to the Muscogee (Creek) Nation. In 1821, after the Treaty of Indian Springs the area became part of the state of Georgia. In 1826, it served as temporary county seat for Lee County upon the creation of the then vast county. Pond Town soon became a lively town noted for horse racing and whiskey. In 1831, the area became part of Sumter County.

Ellaville was founded in 1857 as county seat of the newly formed Schley County. It was incorporated as a town in 1859. The community was named after the daughter of a first settler.

=== Lynchings ===
- The hanging of Charles Blackman occurred in Ellaville, Georgia, on January 25, 1889
- In January 1911 a white man died in a Black owned store. He was taken for his own safety to Columbus for three months but when he returned three months later a mob 200 strong lynched Dawson Jordan, Charles Pickett, and Murray Burton as well as burning down three black lodges, a church and a school.
- October 1912, a prisoner seized from the Sumter County sheriff near Oglethorpe was hung from a bridge and shot dead
- June 1913, twenty-four-year-old Will Redding was dragged from the Ellaville's city jail strung up on a street corner and riddled with bullets.
- Will Jones was lynched in Ellaville, Georgia by a white mob on February 13, 1922.

== Geography ==
According to the United States Census Bureau, the city has a total area of 3.2 square miles (8.3 km^{2}), all land.

== Demographics ==
Historical population
Census	Pop.	Note	%±
1880	182		—
1900	474		—
1910	672		41.8%
1920	693		3.1%
1930	764		10.2%
1940	928		21.5%
1950	886		−4.5%
1960	905		2.1%
1970	1,391		53.7%
1980	1,684		21.1%
1990	1,724		2.4%
2000	1,609		−6.7%
2010	1,812		12.6%
2020	1,595		−12.0%
U.S. Decennial Census

=== 2020 census ===
As of the 2020 census, Ellaville had a population of 1,595. The median age was 35.3 years. 29.0% of residents were under the age of 18 and 15.2% of residents were 65 years of age or older. For every 100 females there were 82.3 males, and for every 100 females age 18 and over there were 78.1 males age 18 and over.

0.0% of residents lived in urban areas, while 100.0% lived in rural areas.

There were 609 households, including 438 families, in Ellaville. Of all households, 38.1% had children under the age of 18, 38.8% were married-couple households, 15.6% were households with a male householder and no spouse or partner present, and 39.6% were households with a female householder and no spouse or partner present. About 31.0% of all households were made up of individuals and 13.3% had someone living alone who was 65 years of age or older.

There were 730 housing units, of which 16.6% were vacant. The homeowner vacancy rate was 0.5% and the rental vacancy rate was 10.5%.

Ellaville racial composition as of 2020
Race	Num.	Perc.
White (non-Hispanic)	951	59.62%
Black or African American (non-Hispanic)	507	31.79%
Native American	1	0.06%
Asian	7	0.44%
Pacific Islander	2	0.13%
Other/Mixed	51	3.2%
Hispanic or Latino	76	4.76%

== Education ==
=== Schley County School District ===
The Schley County School District holds pre-school to grade twelve, and consists of one elementary school and one middle-high school. The district has 66 full-time teachers and over 1,126 students.

- Schley County Elementary School
- Schley Middle High School

== Infrastructure ==
Ellaville is served by U.S. Route 19, Georgia State Route 26 and Georgia State Route 153.

== Notable people ==
- Dakota "Stilts" Albritton, American baseball player for the Savannah Bananas
- Brent Cobb, singer
- Charles Frederick Crisp, Speaker of the United States House of Representatives
- Blaire Erskine, comedian
- Manny Fernandez, former professional football player for Miami Dolphins
- Quentin Fulks, campaign manager
- Caylee Hammack, singer
- Rosa Lee Ingram, subject of 1940's Civil Rights struggle against unfair trials and sentencing in the Jim Crow Era.
- William J. Sears, Congressman from Florida
