= Shirley Green-Reese =

American civil rights activist and professor

- Born: Americus, Georgia, U.S.
- Education: Savannah State University (BS); Georgia State University (MS)
- Occupations: Professor, Researcher
- Movement: Civil Rights Movement

Shirley Green-Reese is a civil rights activist, professor, and a researcher who rose to prominence as one of the 1963 Leesburg Stockade Girls. She was one of the fourteen African American girls who were imprisoned during the Civil Rights Movement in Dawson, Georgia and Leesburg, Georgia.

Green-Reese was a councilwoman in Americus, Georgia. She was the first female from Georgia to serve as the Director of Intercollegiate Athletics at Albany State University. She is also a member of Prince Hall Order of the Eastern Star.

She was also the first female from Georgia to serve on committees such as National Collegiate Athletic Association Management Council, NCAA National Youth Sports Program, and Cost Containment Committees among others. She was nominated to represent the State of Georgia in 2018 as one of the National Black Caucus of State Legislators State Nation Builders.

== Education ==
Green-Reese studied at Savannah State University, where she earned her Bachelor of Science degree in Health and Physical Education. She further studied at Georgia State University, obtaining a Master's degree in administration of health, Physical Education, and Recreation. She completed her Doctor of Philosophy degree in Administration, Supervision, and Professional Preparation at The Florida State University.

== Involvement in the civil rights movement ==
Green-Reese was born in Americus, Georgia, during the era of racial segregation. In the summer of 1963, at the age of 13, she participated in a civil rights protest organized by the Student Nonviolent Coordinating Committee (SNCC) and the National Association for the Advancement of Colored People (NAACP). The protest aimed to challenge the segregation laws at Americus' Martin Theater, where black patrons were required to use a separate entrance at the back of the theater.

As a result of her participation in the protest, Green-Reese and at least 200 or more were arrested by the Americus law enforcement. She and other protesters were held in several nearby jails and holding facilities, before she and 13 other girls were secretly transported to the Leesburg Stockade. Despite being only 20 miles away from their homes, their parents had no knowledge of their whereabouts.

== Rescue and aftermath ==
Green-Reese and her fellow detainees were discovered and rescued by Danny Lyon, a SNCC photographer. Lyon took several pictures of Green-Reese and the girls in the stockade, exposing the horrifying conditions they endured. The photographs were published in various newspapers, bringing national attention to the plight.

After their release, the Leesburg Stockade Girls returned to their homes without any formal acknowledgment or apology for their wrongful imprisonment. Green-Reese kept her experience largely private for decades until 2015.

== Recognition ==
The Smithsonian Institution's National Museum of African American History and Culture highlighted their story in 2016, and a historical marker advocated by Green-Reese was erected at the stockade's site by the Georgia Historical Society on September 21, 2019.
