= Allen S. Cutts =

American military leader (1826–1896)

Allen Sherrod Cutts
- Born: December 4, 1826; Pulaski County, Georgia, U.S.
- Died: March 17, 1896 (aged 69)
- Burial place: Oak Grove Cemetery, Americus, Georgia, U. S.
- Spouse: Fannie O. Brown (m. 1854)
- Military career
- Allegiance: United States of America; Confederate States of America
- Branch: United States Army; Georgia Militia; Confederate States Army
- Service years: 1846-1848 (USA); 1861 (Militia); 1861-1865 (CSA)
- Rank: Sergeant (USA); Brigadier General (Georgia Militia); Colonel (CSA)
- Commands: 2nd Brigade, Georgia Militia; 11th Georgia Artillery Battalion
- Conflicts: Mexican American War: Siege of Veracruz; Battle of Cerro Gordo; American Civil War: First Battle of Bull Run; Battle of Dranesville; Seven Days Battle; Battle of Antietam; Battle of Fredericksburg; Battle of Chancellorsville; Bristoe campaign; Battle of Mine Run; Overland Campaign; Battle of the Wilderness; Siege of Petersburg

Allen Sherrod Cutts (December 4, 1826 – March 17, 1896) was an American military leader, militia leader, farmer, and politician. He was a Mexican-American War veteran, who served as a colonel of artillery in the American Civil War, fighting for the Confederate States Army.

== Early life and pre-war ==
Cutts was born on December 4, 1826, in Pulaski County, Georgia. He was the twelfth and last child of Major Cutts, a farmer born in North Carolina, and Elizabeth Linsey Cutts, born in Indiana. Raised on his father's farms, he received a basic education.

He served in the Mexican–American War as a sergeant in an artillery unit, from 1846 to 1848. Serving under Winfield Scott, he fought in both the Battle of Vera Cruz and the Battle of Cerro Gordo. After returning from the war he became a merchant in Oglethorpe, Georgia, moving to Americus in 1854. On December 17, 1854, Cutts married Fannie O. Brown of Monroe County, Georgia. They had six children: Claude, Clarence, Earnest, Allen, Inez and Eldridge. Outside of his business as a merchant, Cutts was a member of both the Freemasons and the Oddfellows. In 1861, he was a brigadier general for the Georgia Militia 2nd Brigade.

== Civil war ==
At the outbreak of the Civil war, Cutts raised a battery of Artillery in Georgia, known as the Sumter Artillery. The battery arrived in Virginia after the First Battle of Bull Run, and saw action at the Battle of Dranesville. In 1862 Cutts expanded the battery to a battalion, the 11th Georgia Artillery Battalion, becoming its commander. This work was rewarded with promotions to the ranks of major (May 22, 1862), lieutenant colonel (May 26, 1862) and colonel (April 22, 1864). The Battalion served in the Artillery Reserve of the Army of Northern Virginia under William N. Pendleton in the Seven Days Battles. It remained near Richmond, Virginia, for a time, missing the Second Battle of Bull Run. Cutts' battalion fought in the battles of Antietam, Fredericksburg and Chancellorsville, again in the Artillery Reserve; They also fought at Gettysburg, without Cutts, commanded by John Lane.

Cutts resumed command in time for the Bristoe Campaign, in which his battalion served in the Third Corps Artillery under R. Lindsay Walker. It also served in that formation in the Battle of Mine Run. During the Overland Campaign of 1864, Cutts apparently assisted Walker in command of the guns of Hill's Corps during the Battle of the Wilderness. He retained battalion command during most of the Siege of Petersburg. Early in the siege, Cutts was assigned command of a large concentration of guns north of the James River that harassed advancing federal forces trying to take the city. Despite intense counter battery fire from federal artillery, Cutts' gunners dug in and continued their fire. Cutts' battalion later served south of the Appomattox River.

Lane, later a lieutenant colonel, commanded whenever Cutts was on leave. It is likely that Cutts was absent due to illness at the conclusion of the war. Lane was in command just before the Appomattox Campaign, but there is no clear record of the surrender of the Sumter Artillery at the end of the war.

== Post war ==
After the war, Cutts farmed and traded in cotton. He then entered politics as a Democrat, serving as mayor of Americus in 1874–1875, 1877–1878, and 1893–1896. As a member of the Georgia General Assembly in 1890 and 1891, Cutts tried unsuccessfully to secure state funding for the Confederate Soldiers' Home.

He died in office in 1896, and was buried at Oak Grove Cemetery in Americus.
