= Americus movement =

Civil rights protest that began in Americus

- Part of the Civil Rights Movement
- Date: 1963 – 1965
- Location: Americus, Georgia
- Result: Awareness

The Americus movement was a civil rights protest that began in Americus (located in Sumter County), Georgia, United States, in 1963 and lasted until 1965. It was organized by the Student Nonviolent Coordinating Committee along with the NAACP. Its main goals were voter registration and a citizenship education plan.

== First protests ==
The first march began in 1963, in an effort to desegregate the Martin Theater. Less than a dozen activists participated in the first march. Soon, some 250 people were involved. Law enforcement, led by police chief Ross Chambliss, and County Sheriff Fred Chappell began arresting many. Martin Luther King Jr. once called Chappell "the meanest man in the world."

== Leesburg Stockade ==
In July 1963, another march was held, in which a group of young women joined the line to attempt to purchase tickets at the movie theater, and were arrested for doing so. After being held briefly in Dawson, Georgia, the protesters were moved to the Leesburg Stockade Public Works Building in Leesburg, where they were held for 45 days in poor conditions. Estimates of the number of young women who were held there range from 15 to about 30 or as many as 33. Some of the prisoners were as young as 12.

Conditions in the stockade were poor: the prisoners had only concrete floors to sleep on, water only in drips from a shower, a single non-functional toilet, and poor food. The prison authorities did not inform the parents of the prisoners of their arrest or location, and they only found out through the help of a janitor.

The young women were threatened with murder, and at one point a rattlesnake was thrown into their cell.

After the SNCC and Senator Harrison A. Williams used a set of photos by Danny Lyon to publicize the situation, the young women were released. They did not face any criminal charges, but were nevertheless charged a fee for their use of the facilities. They later became known as the "Stolen Girls".

Two of the Leesburg Stockade women, Carol Barner Seay and Sandra Russel Mansfield, were added to the Hall of Fame of the National Voting Rights Museum in 2007. The National Museum of African American History and Culture of the Smithsonian Institution publicized the story of the stolen girls in 2016, and they were recognized by a resolution of the Georgia state legislature.

=== Girls of the stockade ===
- Carol Barner Seay
- Lorena Barnum
- Gloria Breedlove
- Pearl Brown
- Bobbie Jean Butts
- Agnes Carter
- Pattie Jean Colier
- Mattie Crittenden
- Barbara Jean Daniels
- Gloria Dean
- Carolyn Deloatch
- Diane Dorsey
- Juanita Freeman
- Robertiena Freeman
- Henrietta Fuller
- Shirley Ann Green
- Verna Hollis
- Evette Hose
- Mary Frances Jackson
- Vyrtis Jackson
- Dorothy Jones
- Emma Jean Jones
- Melinda Jones-Williams
- Emmarene Kaigler
- Barbara Ann Peterson
- Annie Lue Ragans
- Judith Reid
- Laura Ruff
- Sandra Russell
- Willie Mae Smith
- Eliza Thomas
- Billie Jo Thornton
- Lulu M. Westbrook
- Ozeliar Whitehead
- Carrie Mae Williams

== Results ==
The Americus movement resulted in a higher level of political participation by African Americans in Sumter County and the desegregation of many public places. It also contributed to the passing of the Voting Rights Act of 1965.

In 2007, veterans of the movement returned to Americus as part of a newly established organization, the Americus–Sumter County Movement Remembered, which is dedicated to commemorating and preserving the history and legacy of the Americus movement.
