= Meri Wilson =

American singer (1949–2002)

- Also known as: Meri Wilson Edgmon
- Born: June 15, 1949; Nagoya, Japan
- Died: December 28, 2002 (aged 53) Americus, Georgia, U.S.
- Genre: Novelty songs
- Occupation: Singer
- Instruments: piano, cello, flute
- Years active: 1977–2002
- Labels: GRT, Pye
- Formerly of: Meri Wilson And the Wilsations

Meri Wilson Edgmon (June 15, 1949 – December 28, 2002), known professionally as Meri Wilson, was an American singer born in Japan. She is best known for singing double entendre novelty songs, and jingles.

== Early life ==
Meri Wilson Edgmon was born on June 15, 1949, in Nagoya, Japan. Her father was Keith Streeter Wilson, who was a member of the United States Air Force stationed in Japan. She was raised in Marietta, Georgia. Her parents both played instruments, and encouraged her music interest at a young age.

She graduated with a BS degree in music from Jacobs School of Music at Indiana University Bloomington; and a MA degree in music education from Georgia State University.

== "Telephone Man" and success ==
While singing some jingles in a Dallas–Fort Worth, Texas studio in early 1977, she caught the attention of former Bloodrock vocalist Jim Rutledge from Fort Worth, who introduced her to music producer Boomer Castleman. Wilson began recording for his BNA Records label and taped her self-composed song "Telephone Man" based on her brief affair with a Dallas telephone technician installing the phone in her new apartment there.

Filled with suggestive lyrics and her breathy squealing voice, the song became a surprise hit single, climbing the UK Singles Chart to No. 6, spending ten weeks in the listings, as well as making it to No. 9 in Ireland and New Zealand and No. 18 on the US Billboard Hot 100 chart. It reached No. 42 in Australia, and was also a minor hit in Canada (No. 76).

It became a gold record, selling over one million copies in the U.S. alone. The song became a favorite on the "Dr. Demento Radio Show". "Telephone Man" and "Telephone Line", ELO's song, were back-to-back on the Hot 100's top 40 for two non-consecutive weeks in the summer of 1977.

On the strength of the song's hit, she rapidly put together a full album of songs after quickly being signed with the GRT Records label and released her first and only album, First Take. Unfortunately, although the album contained two more released singles, a second novelty "Rub-A-Dub-Dub" and "Midnight In Memphis", it yielded no further hits, and after her novelty's appeal waned, she went back to singing jingles, modelling and song writing. She also continued to write more novelty songs, including "Peter The Meter Reader," "Dick The DJ", "Santa's Coming," and "My Valentine's Funny," but none of the songs matched the success of her first release. She became known as a "one-hit wonder".

== Later years and death ==
After singing locally in Atlanta, Georgia for more than two decades and occasionally touring on novelty song circuits, in 1999 Meri Wilson released an updated version of "Telephone Man", called "Internet Man". It became a drive-time radio airplay song, which resulted in her getting a deal with Time-Warner Records.

Wilson was killed in a car accident on December 28, 2002, at the age of 53, on Georgia State Route 377 in Americus, Georgia during an ice storm. She is buried at Oak Grove Cemetery in Americus.

Also in 2002 Ansley Records released a self-titled album, which included previously unreleased recordings.

== Discography ==
=== Singles ===
- "Telephone Man" (BNA 1977, GRT 1977)
- "Rub-A-Dub-Dub" (GRT 1977)
- "Midnight In Memphis" (GRT 1977)
- "Peter The Meter Reader" (WMOT 1981)
- "Dick The DJ" (198?)
- "Santa's Coming" (198?)
- "My Valentine's Funny" (198?)
- "Internet Man" (GAMC 1999)

=== Albums ===
- First Take (GRT 8023, 1977, LP, 8-Track, Cassette)
- Meri Wilson: The World's Funniest Telephone Man's Lady (2001, Legend, CD)
- Meri Wilson (2002 Ansley, CD)
- Telephone Man (2012 Fuel 2000, CD) [compilation]
