= Oak Grove Cemetery (Americus, Georgia) =

Historic cemetery in Georgia, US

- U.S. National Register of Historic Places
- U.S. Historic district – Contributing property
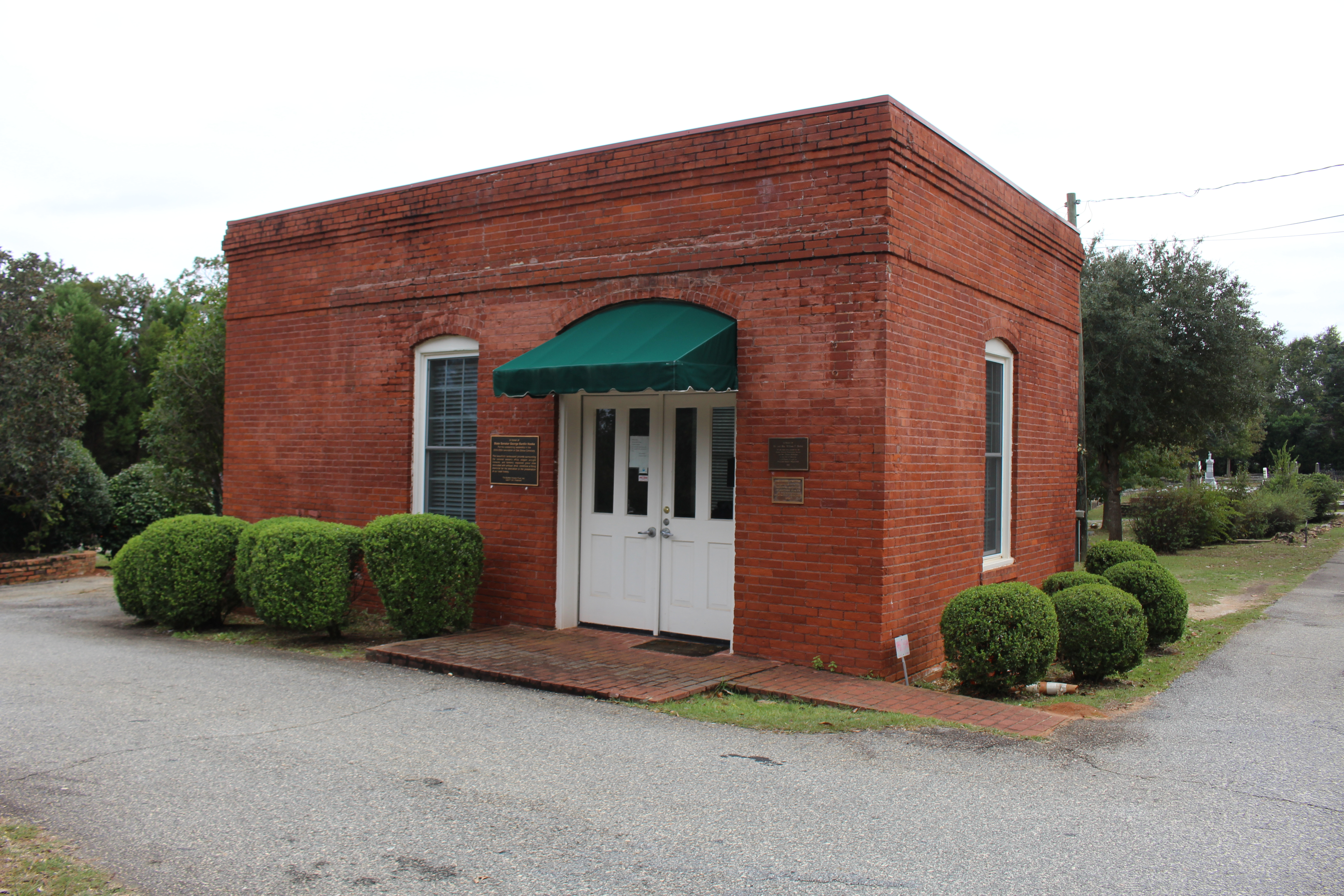
- Oak Grove Cemetery office
- Location: 309 Rees Street, Americus, Sumter County, Georgia, U.S.
- Coordinates: 32.06920°N 84.22110°W
- Built: 1856
- Part of: Americus Historic District
- NRHP reference No.: 79003319 (Increase)
- Added to NRHP: September 3, 1979

Oak Grove Cemetery is a historic place of burial located in Americus, Sumter County, Georgia, U.S.. It is one of the contributing properties for the Americus Historic District, since the boundary increased in 1979.

== History ==
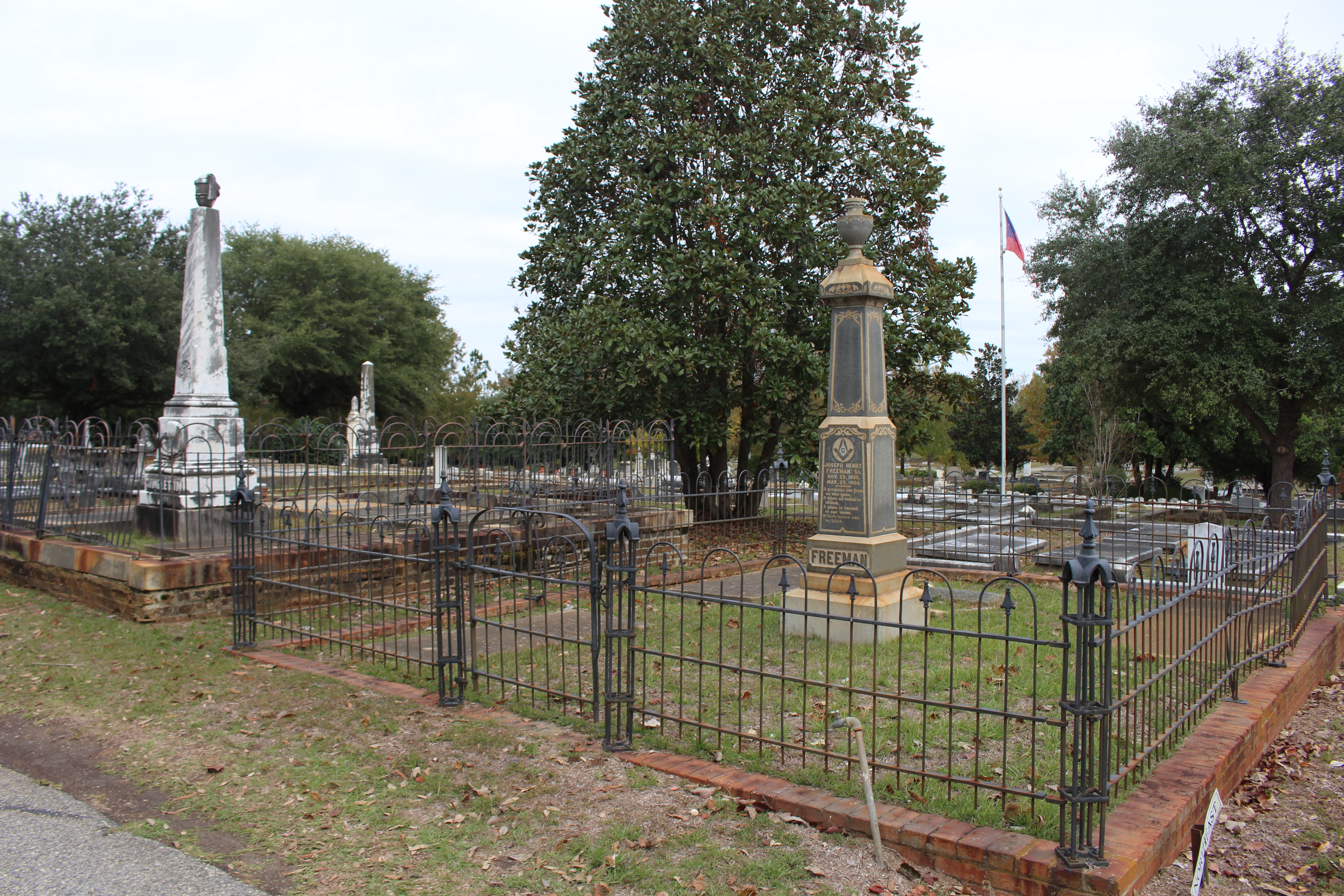
Oak Grove Cemetery

The Oak Grove Cemetery was founded in 1856, and is operated by the city of Americus. The property's first 9 acres (3.6 ha) was purchased from local physician Dr. Albert Rees.

In 1880, the 129 bodies of Confederate soldiers were moved from Andersonville to Americus and placed in Oak Grove Cemetery. It contains the burial for 129 veterans of the Confederate States Army, of which 45 of the burials are "unknown". Ladies' Memorial Association of Americus added a Confederate memorial statue in 1899. It also contains a small section for Spanish–American War veterans.

In 2024, some gravestones from the 19th-century at Oak Grove Cemetery were vandalized.

== Notable internments ==
- Griffin Bell (1918–2009) judge, 72nd Attorney General of the United States, served under President Carter
- Dr. George F. Cooper (1825–1882), physician, Baptist minister, and founder of the public school system in Americus
- Joel Crawford (1783–1858), U.S. Congressman
- Charles Frederick Crisp (1845–1896), English-born American politician, U.S. Congressman
- Charles Robert Crisp (1870–1937), U.S. Congressman
- Allen Sherrod Cutts (1826–1896), military leader, colonel of artillery of the Confederate States Army, farmer, and politician
- Joanna Moore (1934–1997), film and television actress
- Meri Wilson (1949–2002), American singer, born in Japan

== See also ==
- National Register of Historic Places listings in Sumter County, Georgia
- List of cemeteries in Georgia (U.S. state)
