= Calvary Episcopal Church (Americus, Georgia) =

- U.S. Historic district – Contributing property
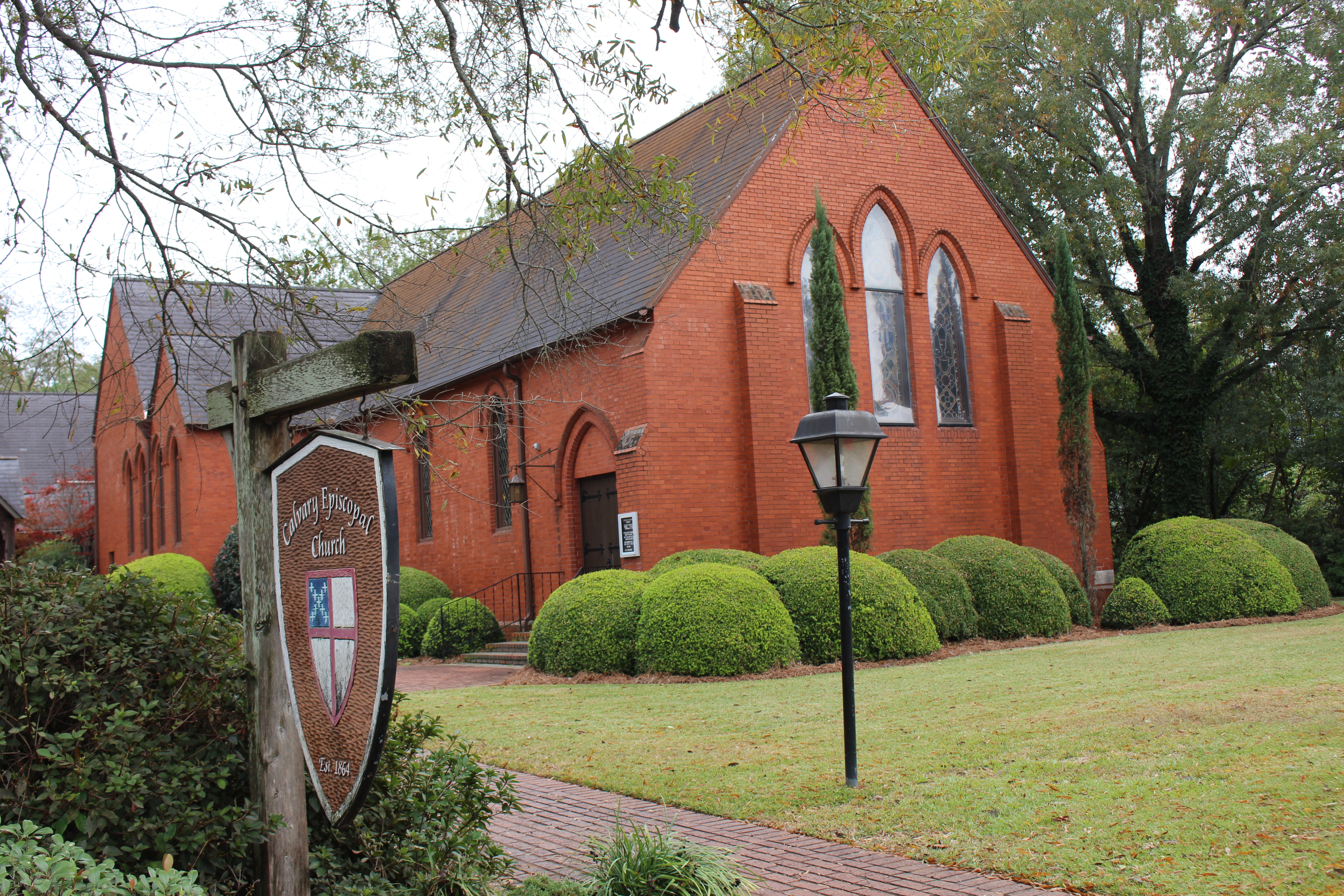
- Calvary Episcopal Church (2019)

- Location within Georgia
- Location: 408 South Lee Street, Americus, Georgia, U.S.
- Coordinates: 32°4′1.524″N 84°13′47.316″W
- Built: 1921
- Architect: Ralph Adams Cram (current building)
- Part of: Americus Historic District (ID76000648)
- NRHP reference No.: (original); 79003319 (increase)

Significant dates
- Added to NRHP: January 1, 1976
- Boundary increase: September 3, 1979

Calvary Episcopal Church
- Calvary Church
- Calvary Episcopal Church
- Denomination: Episcopal Church
- Website: calvaryepiscopalamericus.org

History
- Founded: 1864

Administration
- Province: Province IV
- Diocese: Episcopal Diocese of Georgia

Calvary Episcopal Church is an Episcopal church in Americus, Georgia. First organized in 1864, the current building was constructed in 1921. It is one of the contributing properties to the Americus Historic District since 1976.

In 2017, the church reported 250 members; in 2023, it reported 187 members. No membership statistics were reported in 2024 national parochial reports. Plate and pledge financial support reported by the church in 2024 was $329,685. Average Sunday Attendance (ASA) reported in 2024 was 55 persons. This was a relative decrease on ASA of 71 in 2020.

== A Ralph Adams Cram Church in Americus, Georgia ==
It was an example of a major architectural movement, summed up in a tiny historical event. In 1917, the congregation of Calvary Episcopal Church in Americus, Georgia, moved their decaying "Carpenter Gothic" church off its site to make room for a new church by Ralph Adams Cram, who was arguably the leading ecclesiastical architect in America.

No event could better summarize Cram's influence on American church architecture, for it was Cram himself, in his condemnation of "Carpenter Gothic" (and nineteenth-century American Gothic in general), who had succeeded in "revolutionizing the entire visual expression of American Christianity in this century." Of "Carpenter Gothic," for example, Cram had written, "the sheer savagery of these box-like wooden structures, with their toothpick pinnacles and their adventitious buttresses of seven-eights-inch board and their jigsaw ornament, find no rival in all history."

Cram forcefully argued that nineteenth-century American Gothic has resulted in nothing but sham and pretentiousness, and he considered the fifty-year period after 1930 to have been "worse than at any time or in any place recorded in history." Such a strident polemic was based on moral as well as aesthetic grounds. According to Cram, the nineteenth-century Gothicists had been guilty of practicing "archaeology" rather than art, through the servile imitation of historical models. Furthermore, by their use of sham materials and construction methods, they had added pretentiousness to their sins.

Cram, thus, argued for a return to the first principles of Gothic architecture whereby the artificial, derivative qualities of the previous decades could be avoided and a new organic structural integrity as well as functional responsiveness could be gained. In short, he advised architects "to study the motives and principles of Medieval Christian architecture rather than the mouldings."

In addition, Cram, by way of Ruskin, had fully embraced the doctrine of honest structural expression which, in church buildings, became for Cram an inviolable law: "If a church is not honest - honest in its design, its construction, its decoration-it is nothing; and any added richness, if it is the richness of falsity, is only added sham."

== History ==
The parish was established in Americus, Georgia in 1864 as the second attempt by the Episcopal Church at a presence in the city. In 1869, Bishop John W. Beckwith presided over the placement of the cornerstone for the first church house. In 1905, the Reverend James Bolan Lawrence became rector of the parish, a position he would hold until 1947. In 1910, the church hosted the annual convention for the Episcopal Diocese of Georgia. In March 1919, construction began on the current building, built on the same location as the original building. The architect in charge of the building's design was noted ecclesiastical architect Ralph Adams Cram. The building was completed in 1921.

In 2000, major renovations were completed on the building. In 2014, the Georgia Historical Society erected a Georgia historical marker commemorating the history of the church. In 2017, the church and the nearby Lee Street Bridge were placed on the Georgia Trust for Historic Preservation's list of Places in Peril due to concerns regarding the replacement of the Lee Street Bridge with a larger bridge that could negatively affect the historicity of the area. These concerns were later satiated, as the replacement bridge was the same height as the previous bridge.

== Bibliography ==
- Alston, Beth (January 30, 2016). "Calvary Episcopal Church has new rector". Americus Times-Recorder. CNHI.
- Brown, Brian (May 11, 2015). "Calvary Episcopal Church, 1921, Americus". Vanishing South Georgia.
- "Marker Dedication: Calvary Episcopal Church". Georgia Historical Society. September 19, 2014.
- "Calvary Episcopal Church". Georgia Historical Society. March 13, 2015.
- "Calvary Episcopal Church and Lee Street Bridge". Georgia Trust for Historic Preservation. October 10, 2017.
- "Georgia Trust for Historic Preservation Announces Its 2019 List of State's 10 'Places in Peril'". Georgia Trust for Historic Preservation. November 7, 2018.
- Lawrence, James Bolan (1912). A History of Calvary Church, Americus, Georgia, 1858-1912. Foote & Davies Company – via Google Books.
- The Living Church Annual and Whittaker's Churchman's Almanac. Young Churchman Company. 1910 – via Google Books.
