= Americus Historic District =

Historic district in Georgia, US

- U.S. National Register of Historic Places
- U.S. Historic district
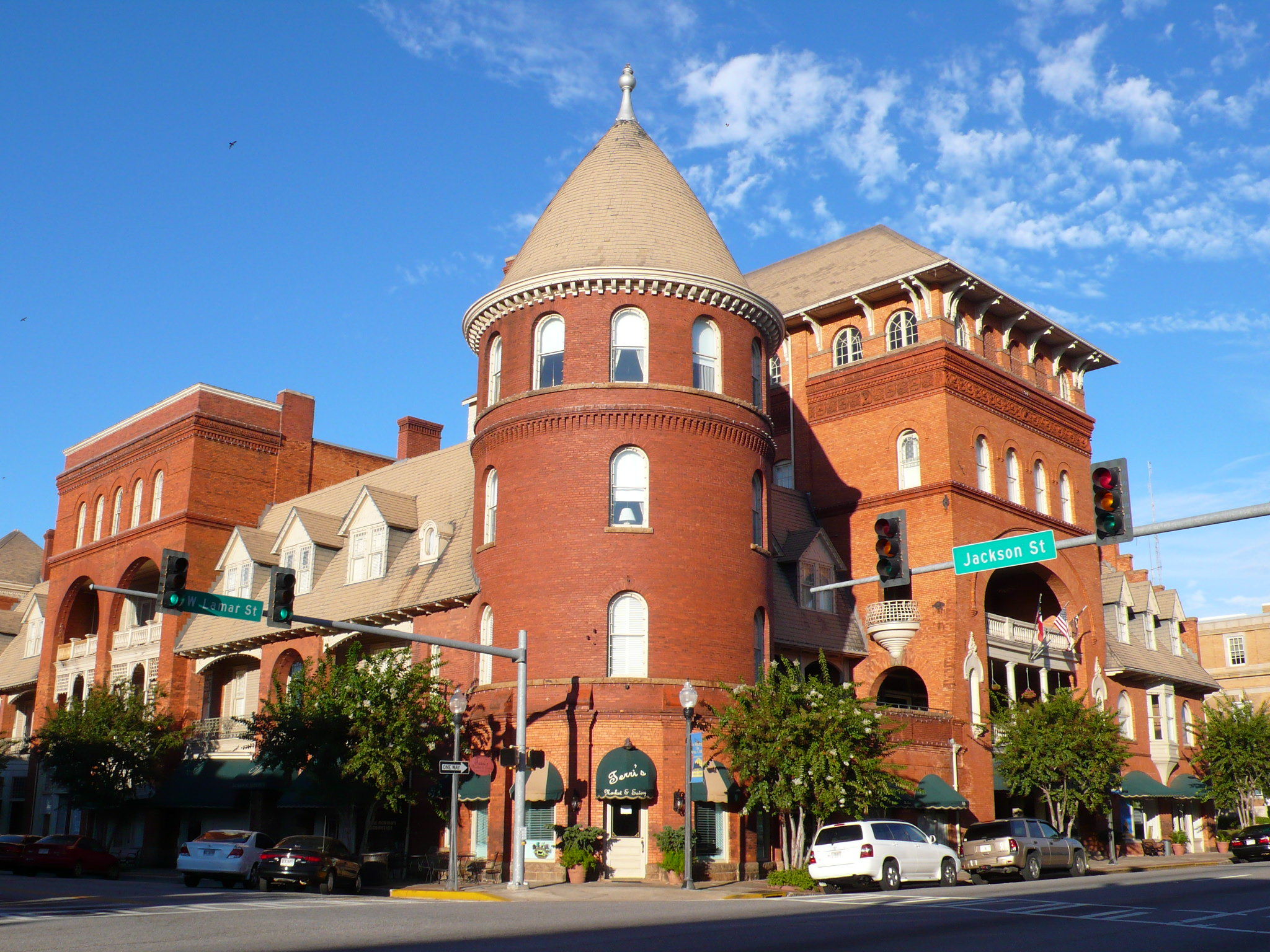
- Windsor Hotel (1892) in Americus

- Location within Georgia
- Location: Irregular pattern along Lee St. with extensions to Dudley St., railroad tracks, Rees Park, and Glessner St., Americus, Sumter County, Georgia, U.S.
- Coordinates: 32°4′2″N 84°14′5″W
- Area: 250 acres (100 ha)
- Architectural style: Classical Revival, Late Gothic Revival, Romanesque
- NRHP reference No.: 76000648 (original); 79003319 (increase)

Significant dates
- Added to NRHP: January 1, 1976
- Boundary increase: September 3, 1979

The Americus Historic District is a historic district in Americus, Sumter County, Georgia, U.S.. The defined area is an irregular pattern along Lee Street, with extensions on Dudley Street, at the railroad tracks, Rees Park, and Glessner Street. It has been listed on the National Register of Historic Places since January 1, 1976. Church Street and the Oak Grove Cemetery represent a boundary increase on September 3, 1979.

== History ==
The Americus Historic District contains some 400 buildings, and within it are a railroad yard and business district. Of the numerous buildings in the district some 17 buildings are considered "most noticeable" ranked by the city, and it contains 35 intrusion properties. The original town square of Americus was block bounded by Lamar, Lee, Forsyth, and Jackson streets.

== Notable listed-buildings ==
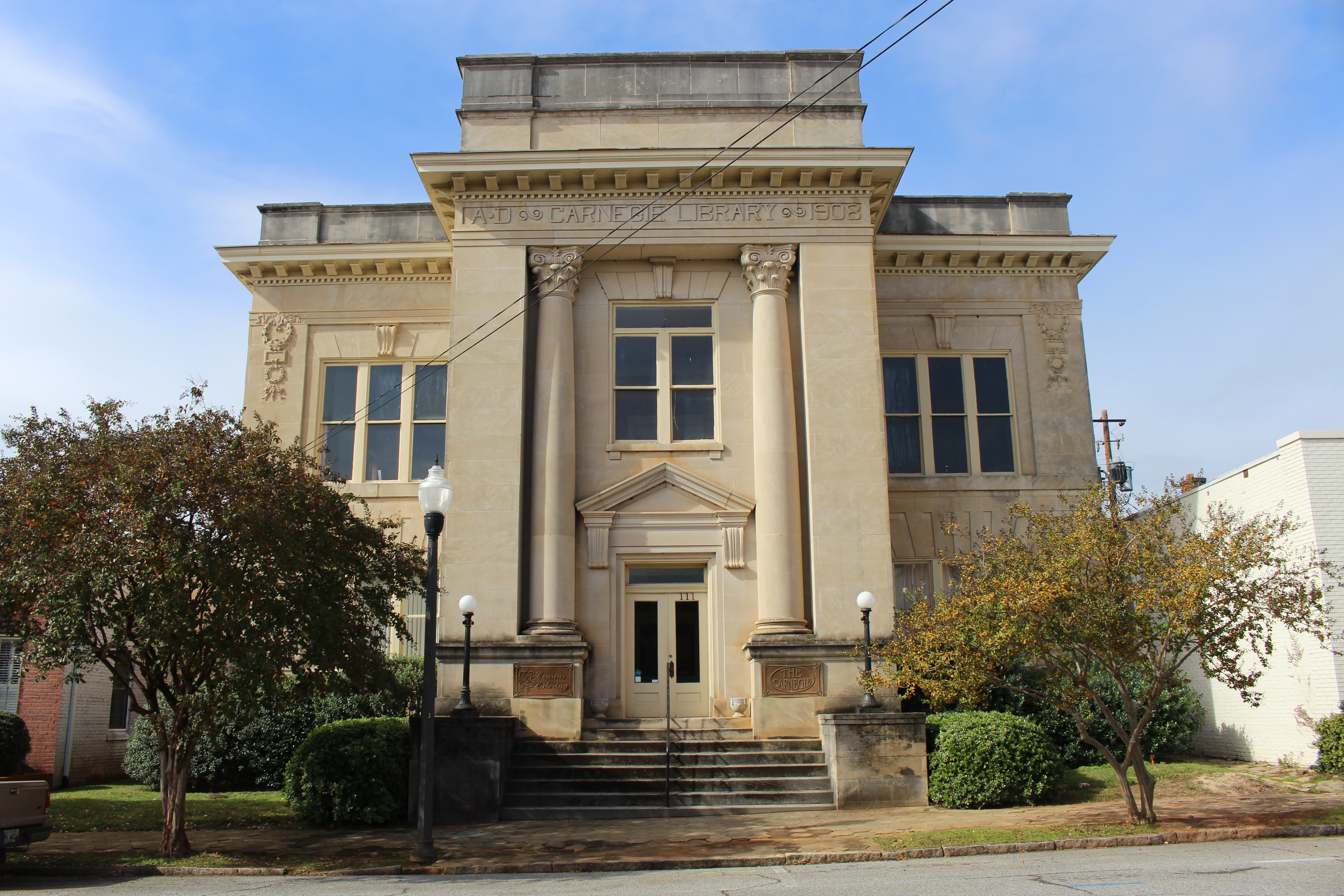
Carnegie Library (1908), Americus

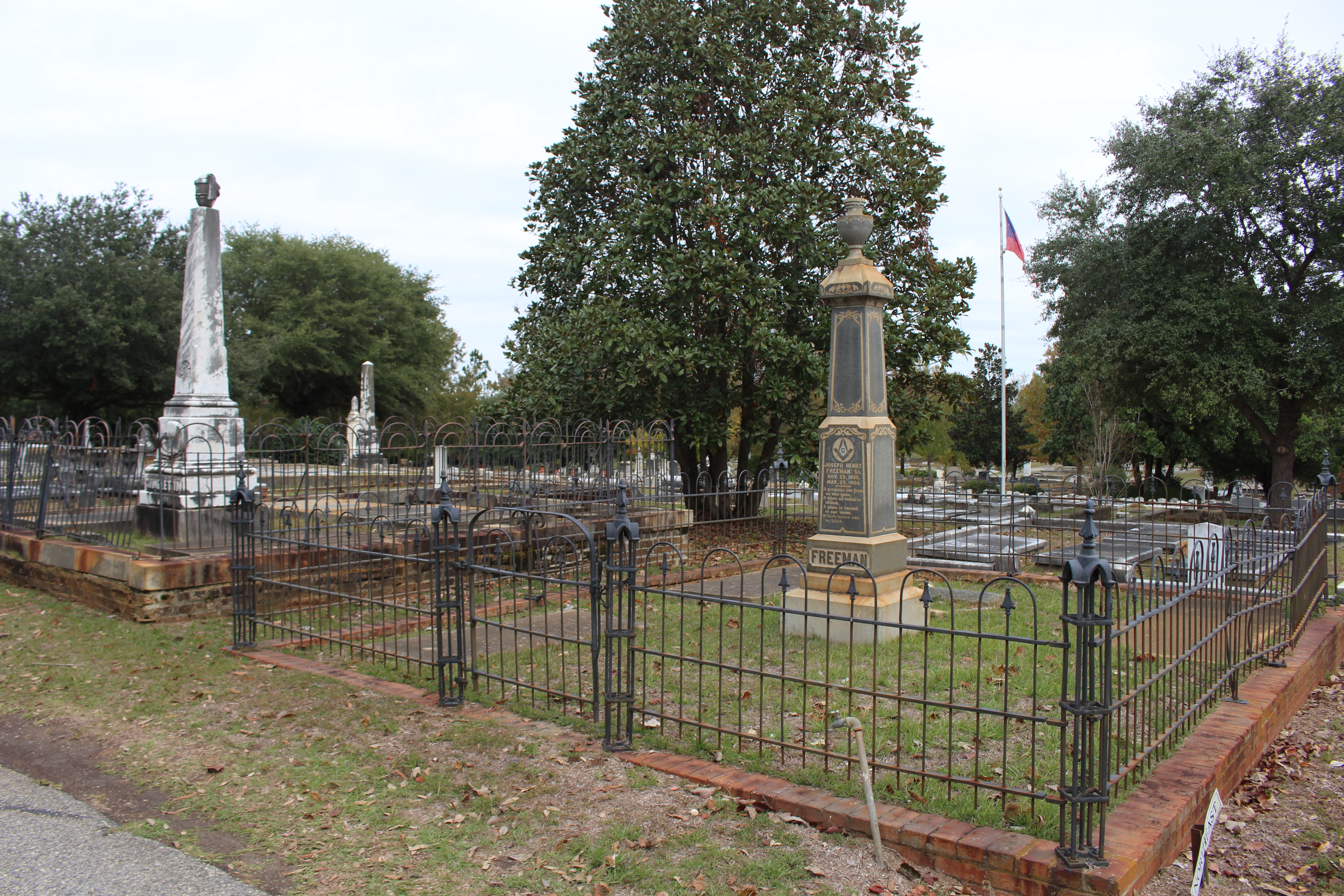
Oak Grove Cemetery (1856)

- Victorian freight depot
- Harrold Warehouse (or the Johnson and Harrold Warehouse, 1889); designed for cotton storage
- Glover's Opera House (1882), 111 West Forsyth Street; later known as Dudley's Opera House
- Thornton–Wheatley Building (1892), corner of Forsyth and Jackson Streets; also known as Pythian Castle, the third floor was used by the Knights of Pythias
- Windsor Hotel (1892), 125 West Lamar Street
- Carnegie Library (1908), 111 South Jackson Street
- Americus Presbyterian Church (1884), 125 South Jackson Street
- 404 Church Street (c. 1860)
- 130 Jackson Street
- Eldridge–Ferguson residence (c. 1867), 301 Lee Street
- Calvary Episcopal Church (1919), 408 South Lee Street
- Uriah B. Harrold residence (1893), corner of Lee and College Streets; also known as the Hancock Funeral Home
- Bell–Dean–LeSueur residence (1905), 501 Lee Street
- Cobb House (c. 1850), Lee Street; house was moved from nearby Oglethorpe, it was the former home of Capt. John Addison Cobb (1788–1855)
- 605 Lee Street (c. 1840)
- Eldridge residence (1862), corner of College Street and Hancock Drive
- Charles Robert Crisp residence, 139 Taylor Street
- Rees Park, 409 Elm Street; former property of Dr. Albert Rees, a local physician who donated the land to the city in memory of his son Lucius who died in the Confederate States Army during the Civil War
- Rees Park Grammar School (1914)
- John Windsor residence
- Hodges–Buchanan–Smith House (1905), 606 Rees Park
- Sumter County Hospital (1913)
- Furlow Grammar School (1914), 63 Valley Drive; former site of Furlow Female College, now Furlow Charter School
- Oak Grove Cemetery (1856), 309 Rees Street

== See also ==
- National Register of Historic Places listings in Sumter County, Georgia
