= Windsor Hotel (Americus, Georgia) =

1892 hotel building in Georgia, US

- Windsor Hotel, Ascend Hotel Collection
- U.S. Historic district – Contributing property
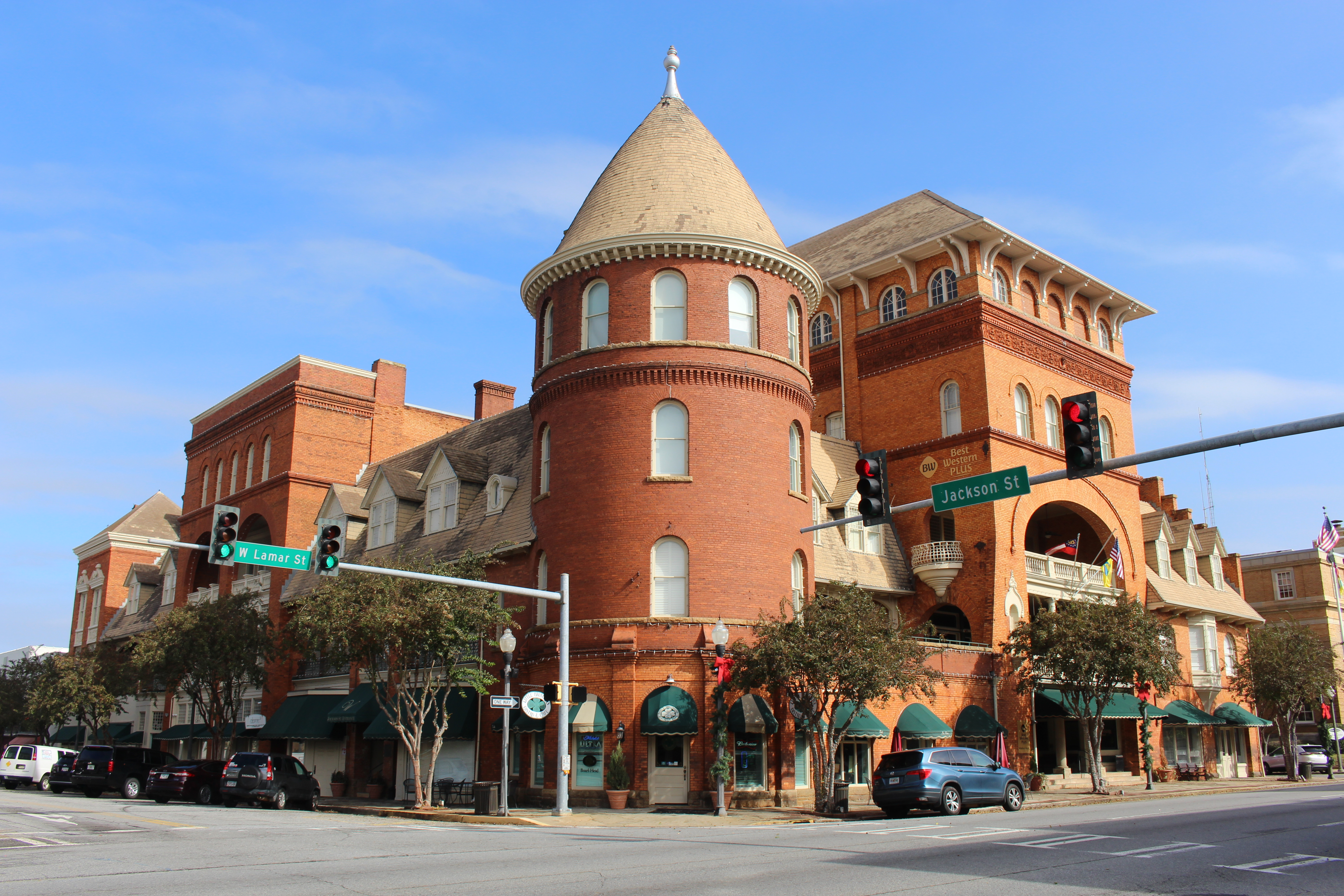
- Windsor Hotel façade
- Location: 125 West Lamar Street, Americus, Georgia
- Coordinates: 32°4′20″N 84°14′1″W
- Built: 1892
- Part of: Americus Historic District (ID76000648)
- NRHP reference No.: (original); 79003319 (increase)

Significant dates
- Added to NRHP: January 1, 1976
- Boundary increase: September 3, 1979

The Windsor Hotel, Ascend Hotel Collection at 125 West Lamar Street in Americus, Georgia was built in 1892 to attract winter visitors from the northeastern United States. The five-story Queen Anne hotel was designed by a Swedish-born architect, Gottfried Leonard Norrman, working in Atlanta. It featured a hundred rooms and a three-story atrium. It closed in the early 1970s, but later reopened with 53 guest rooms.

The Windsor is a contributing property within the National Register Americus Historic District since 1976. Vice-President Thomas R. Marshall gave a speech from the balcony in 1917, and the soon-to-be New York Governor Franklin D. Roosevelt spoke in the dining room in 1928. Former President Jimmy Carter (born in nearby Plains, Georgia) had been a supporter of the hotel since its reopening.
