= Moses Speer =

American civil war veteran

Personal details
- Born: Giles County, Tennessee, U.S.
- Died: Americus, Georgia, U.S

Military service
- Allegiance: Confederate States
- Branch/service: Confederate States Army
- Rank: Major
- Battles/wars: American Civil War; Peninsula campaign; Battle of Malvern Hill

Moses Speer (February 17, 1832 – December 10, 1898) was an American Civil War veteran from Giles County, Tennessee. He served during the mid-19th century and later settled in Americus, Sumter County, Georgia, where he lived until his death.

Following the Civil War, Moses Speer returned to Americus and subsequently became the President and Director of the Bank of Southwestern Georgia. Speer is credited as building the first brick building in the city of Americus, Georgia.
