= Leesburg Stockade =

Event in the civil rights movement

The Leesburg Stockade was an event in the civil rights movement in which a group of African-American teenage and pre-teen girls were arrested for protesting racial segregation in Americus, Georgia, and were imprisoned without charges for 60 days in poor conditions in the Lee County Public Works building, in Leesburg, Georgia. The building was then called the Leesburg Stockade, and gave its name to the event. The young prisoners became known as the Stolen Girls.

== Background ==
In July, 1963, the Student Nonviolent Coordinating Committee (the SNCC), in cooperation with the National Association for the Advancement of Colored People, organized a protest march in Americus from the Friendship Baptist Church to a segregated movie theater. As part of the protest, a group of young women joined the line to attempt to purchase tickets at the movie theater, and were arrested for doing so. After being held briefly in Dawson, Georgia, the protesters were moved to the Leesburg Stockade. Estimates of the number of young women who were held there range from 15 to about 30 or as many as 33.

== Imprisonment ==
Some of the prisoners were as young as 12. Conditions in the stockade were poor: the prisoners had only concrete floors to sleep on, water only in drips from a shower, a single non-functional toilet, and poor food. The prison authorities did not inform the parents of the prisoners of their arrest or location, and they only found out through the help of a janitor. The young women were threatened with murder, and at one point a rattlesnake was thrown into their cell. After the SNCC and Senator Harrison A. Williams used a set of photos taken by photographer Danny Lyon to publicize the situation, the young women were released, and did not face any criminal charges, but were nevertheless charged a fee for their use of the facilities.

== Recognition ==
Two of the Leesburg Stockade women, Carol Barner Seay and Sandra Russel Mansfield, were added to the Hall of Fame of the National Voting Rights Museum in 2007. The National Museum of African American History and Culture of the Smithsonian Institution publicized the story of the stolen girls in 2016, and they were recognized by a resolution of the Georgia state legislature. On Friday, September 27, 2019, the Georgia Historical Society erected a Historical Marker at the stockade as part of their Civil Rights Trail. Shirley Green-Reese and Colby Pines managed the Historical Marker application and installation process, and the marker was sponsored by the Lee County High School AP English Program, the Lee County High School Beta Club, and First Monumental Faith Ministries.

== Girls of the stockade ==
The arrested girls included:

- Carol Barner Seay
- Gloria Breedlove
- Pearl Brown
- Mattie Crittenden
- Diane Dorsey
- Shirley Green-Reese
- Verna Hollis
- Melinda Jones-Williams
- Emmarene Kaigler-Streeter
- Annie Lue Ragans
- Laura Ruff
- Sandra Russell
- Willie Smith Davis
- Billie Jo Thornton
- Lulu M. Westbrook
- Barbara Ann Peterson

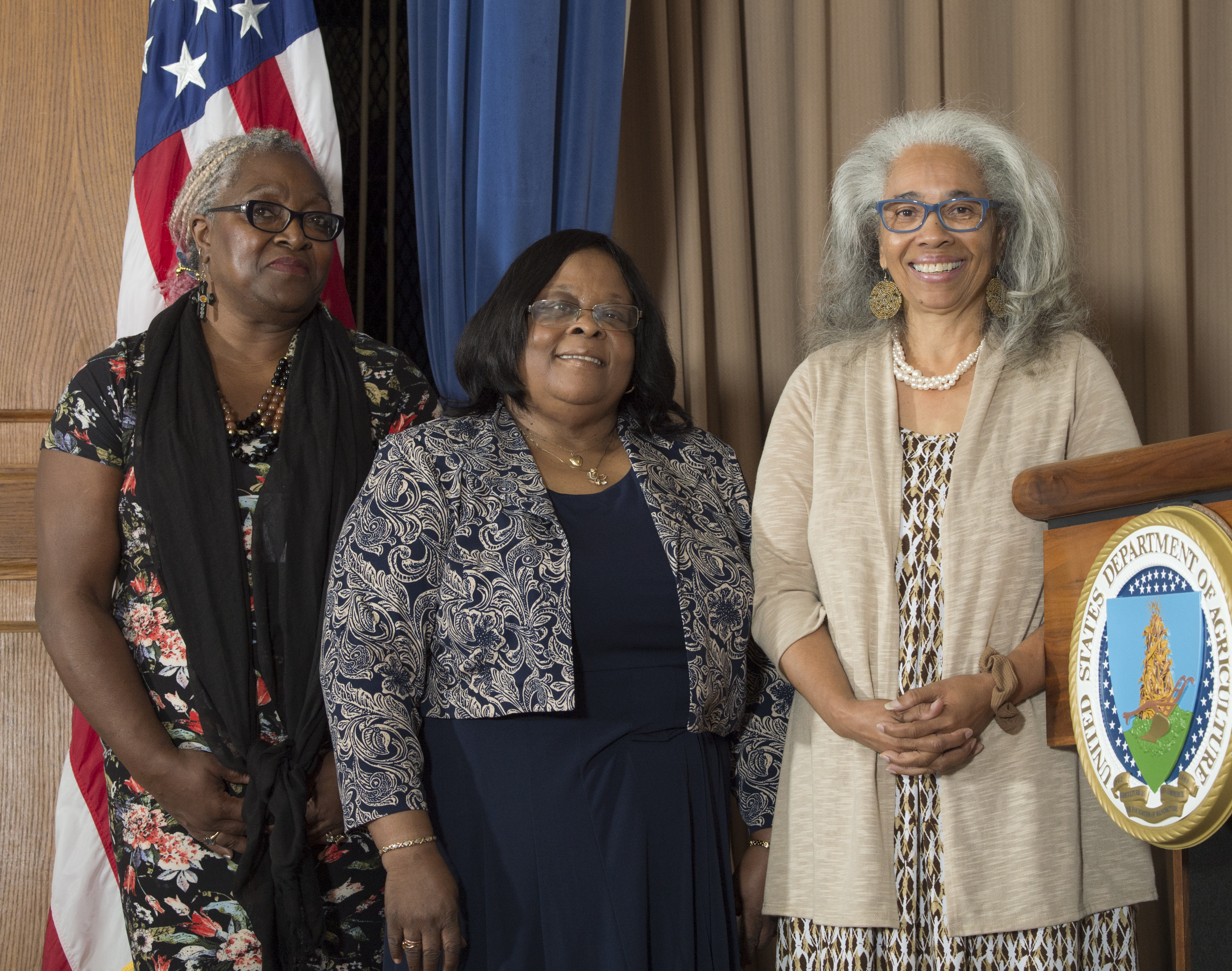
L to R) Lulu Westbrooks Griffin, Emmarene Streeter and Dr. Carol Barner Seay in 2015
