= G. L. Norrman =

American architect

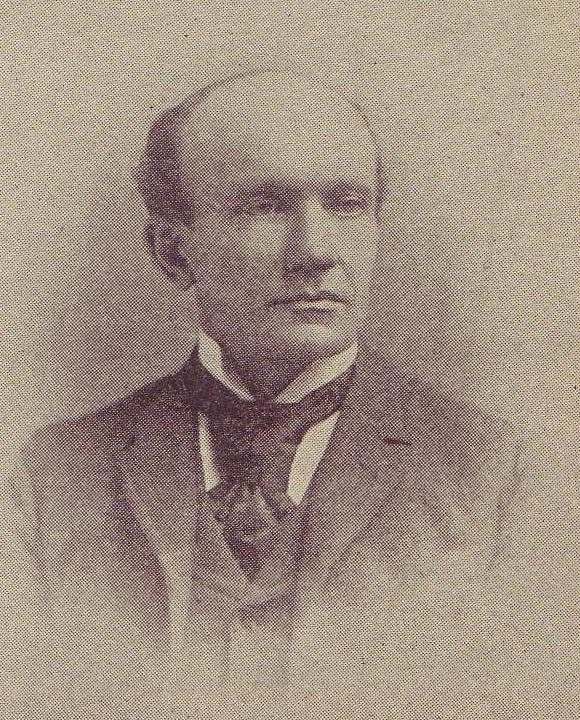
G.L. Norrman in 1892

Godfrey Leonard Norrman, FAIA (1846 – November 16, 1909) was an important architect in the southeastern United States. A number of his commissions are now listed on the National Register of Historic Places, and in 1897 he was made a Fellow of the American Institute of Architects.

== Biography ==
A native of Sweden, Norrman arrived in Atlanta, Georgia, around 1880 and designed buildings for the International Cotton Exposition (1881). His significant works include the Armstrong Hotel in Rome, the Windsor Hotel in Americus, the Gate City Bank and Hebrew Orphan Asylum, Edward Peters Atlanta mansion (1883), Anderson Hall at Savannah College of Art and Design (1896) and the Piedmont Exposition Building of Atlanta, and also homes in Inman Park Atlanta. He formed a partnership, Norrman & Humphreys, with George Phares Humphreys, the architect of Joel Chandler Harris's home, the Wren's Nest. Norrman maintained offices in Joel Hurt's Equitable Building and resided in the Kimball House, remaining in Atlanta until his death.

A number of his works are listed on the U.S. National Register of Historic Places (NRHP). He was a member of the American Institute of Architects (1885-1888 and 1897 to his death) and was elected a Fellow of the organization in 1897. Norrman suffered from ill health near the end of his life, and died by suicide on November 16, 1909. He is buried in Oakland Cemetery in Atlanta.

== Works ==
Works include (with attribution):

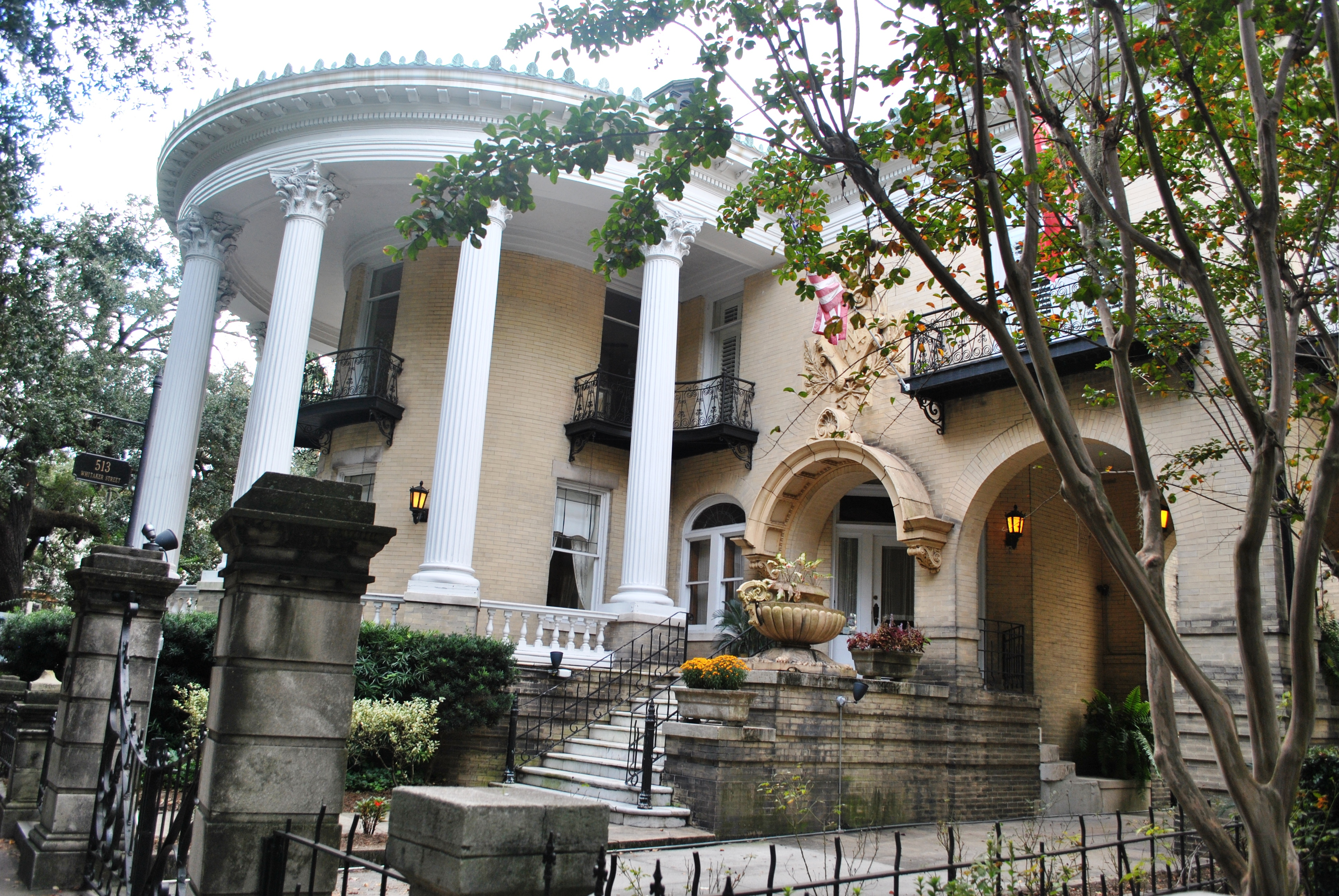
513 Whitaker Street, Savannah, Georgia, was built for Lawrence McNeill by G.L. Norman, 1903

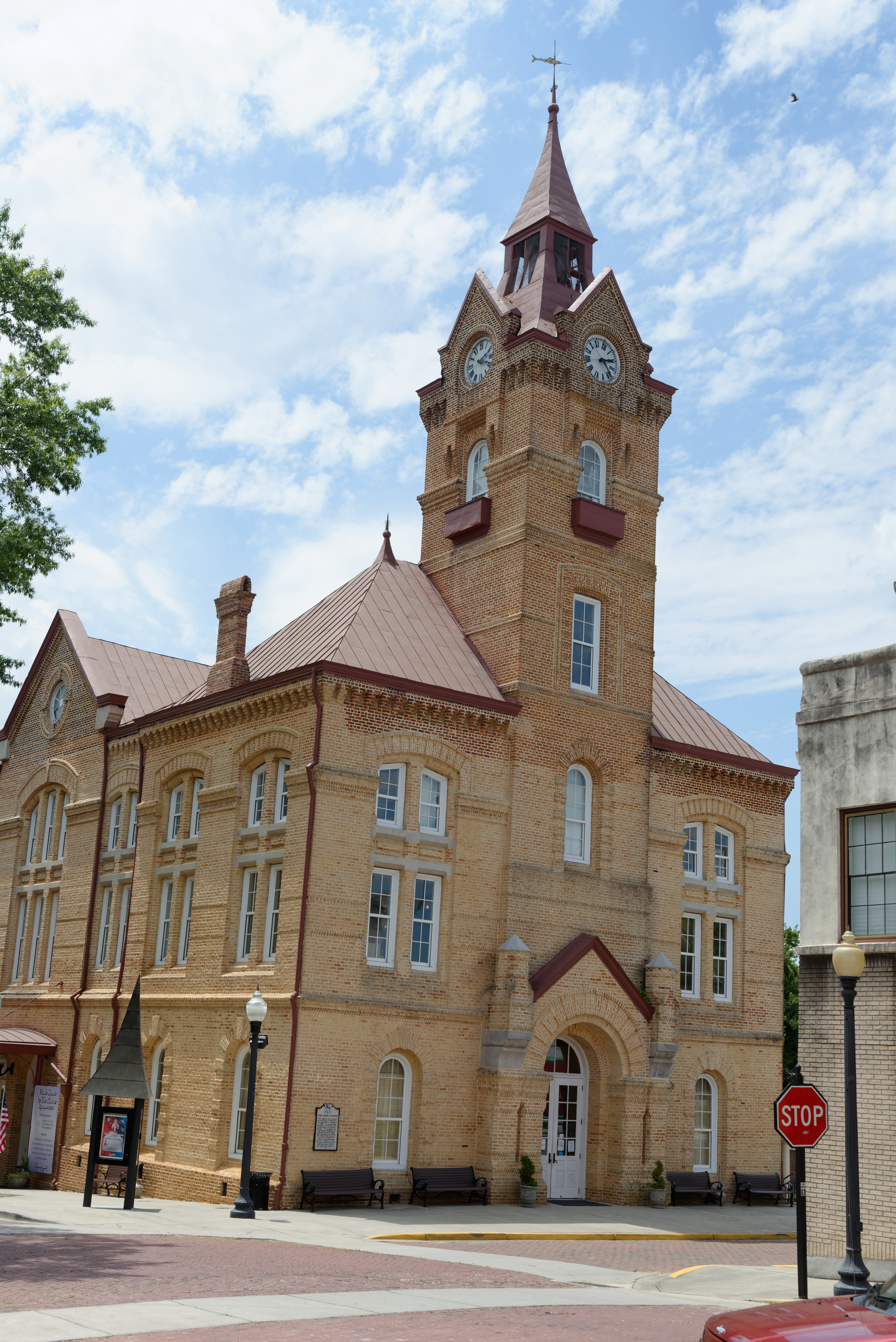
Newberry Opera House

- Edward C. Peters House (1883), 179 Ponce de Leon Ave. Atlanta, Georgia (Norrman, Godfrey L.), NRHP-listed
- Anderson Hall at Savannah College of Art and Design (1896)
- Dargan-Crosby House (1896), 767 Piedmont Ave NE, Atlanta, Georgia (Norrman, Godfrey L.), NRHP-listed
- Reynolds House (1896), 763 Piedmont Ave NE, Atlanta, Georgia (Norrman, Godfrey L.), NRHP-listed
- Armstrong Hotel, Rome, Georgia
- Windsor Hotel of Americus, Georgia.
- the Gate City Bank and Hebrew Orphan Asylum,
- the Piedmont Exposition Building of Atlanta
- Bishop William Wallace Duncan House at Spartanburg, South Carolina.
- Sixteenth Street School, 1532 3rd Ave. Columbus, Georgia (Norrman, G.L.), NRHP-listed
- Springwood Cemetery, Main St. and Elford St. Greenville, South Carolina (Norrman, Godfrey L.), NRHP-listed
- Maxwell House, at 134 McDonald Street, Marietta, Georgia, in the NRHP-listed Whitlock Avenue Historic District (Norrman, Godfrey L.), NRHP-listed
- One or more works in Atlanta University Center District, roughly bounded by transit right-of-way, Northside Dr., Walnut, Fair, Roach, W. End Dr., Euralee and Chestnut Sts. Atlanta, Georgia (Norrman, Godfrey L.), NRHP-listed
- House for Lawrence McNeil, Savannah (1903) Paul Romare Residence, 17 East North Avenue, Atlanta, Georgia, built around 1892 or 1893. The Bank of America Building now stands on this property. Thacker Howard Bell Residence, 665 Peachtree Street, Atlanta, Georgia, built around 1892 or 1893. Location: northeast corner of Peachtree and Fifth Street
- Newberry Opera House, Newberry, South Carolina, 1882, on the NRHP.
