= Ruby Muhammad =

American matriarch figure in the Nation of Islam (c. 1907–2011)

- Born: Ruby Macie Grier c. 1907; Sandersville, Georgia, U.S.
- Died: March 2, 2011 (aged 103–104); Sacramento, California, U.S.
- Other name: Ruby Pittman
- Known for: Mother of the Nation of Islam (1986–2011)

Ruby Macie Muhammad (née Grier; c. 1907 – March 2, 2011) was an American religious figure known as the Mother of the Nation of Islam.

Muhammad was born on a farm in Sandersville, Georgia and grew up in Americus. No birth certificate exists to confirm her age, and it has been reported with significant disparity, although she claimed in newspaper interviews that she was born Ruby Macie Grayer on March 20, 1897. Later research, however, suggests she was born in 1907, a decade later, based on the listing of Ruby Macie Grier, recorded as aged 3, in the 1910 census.

Her mother, born in 1889, died when she was very young, and she was raised by a woman she called her aunt, although she would later say that this woman was probably not her biological aunt. She did not know her father until she was a teenager. Community records in Sandersville, where she was born, indicate her father died at age 107 and her great-grandfather died at age 110.

== Mother of Islam ==
Muhammad spent her early years working in the fields and joined the Nation of Islam in 1946 and was named "Mother of the Nation of Islam" in 1986 by Minister Louis Farrakhan. This is an honorary title; Muhammad, who was married twice, was not the widow of Elijah Muhammad, who founded the Nation of Islam.

In 2006, Muhammad moved into a senior center in Rancho Cordova, Sacramento, California. In 2008, Muhammad, then known as Ruby Pittman (the name of her first husband), received a motorized wheelchair as a donation from a scooter store.

== Personal life and death ==
Ruby Muhammad was married to John Pittman and had four children. After her first husband died she married James Hyder in 1967. She died in Sacramento on March 2, 2011.
