= Bishop William Wallace Duncan House =

Historic house in South Carolina, United States

- U.S. National Register of Historic Places
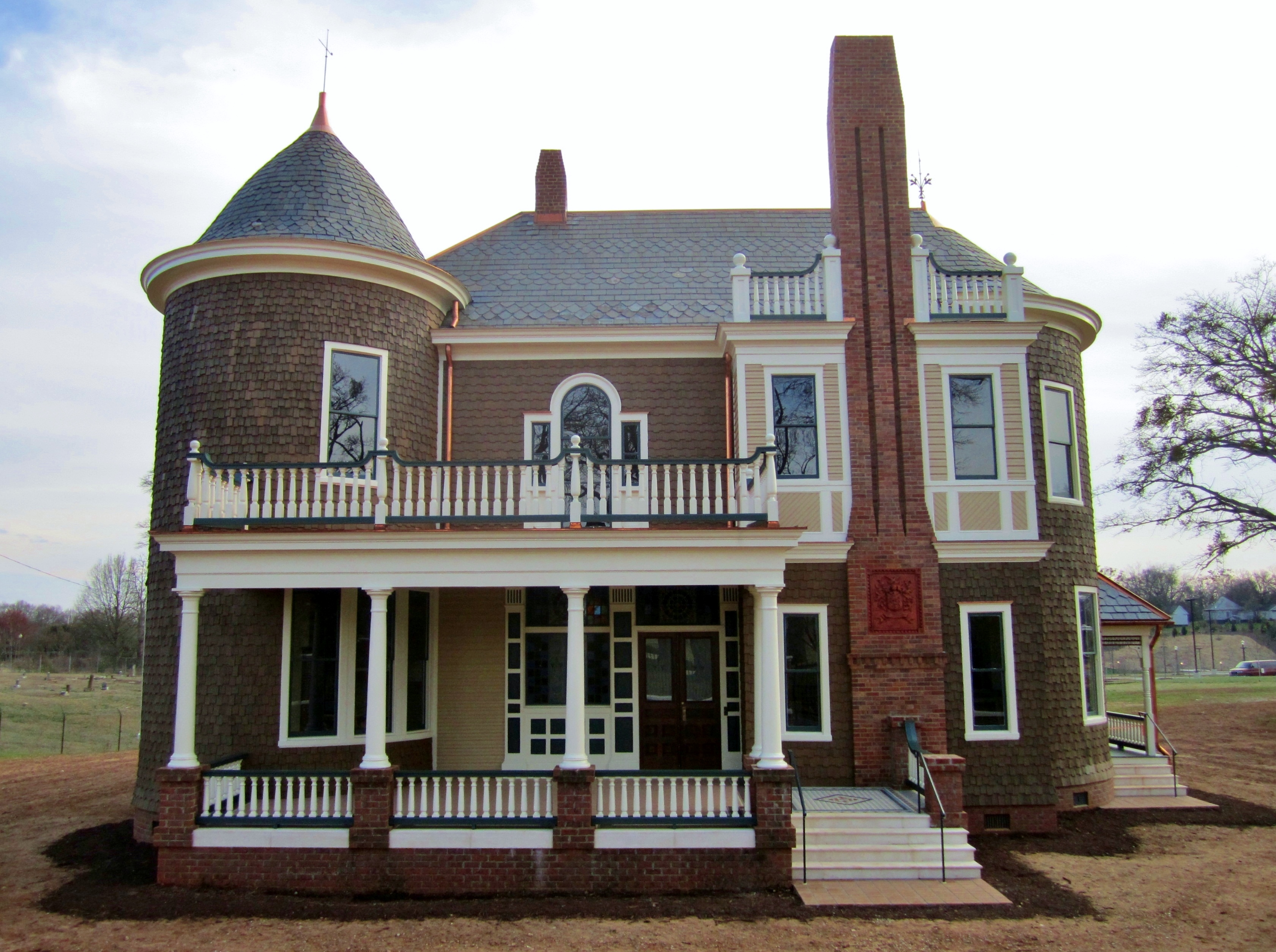
- Bishop William Wallace Duncan House, March 2013

- Location within South Carolina Location within the United States
- Location: 300 Howard St., Spartanburg, South Carolina
- Coordinates: 34°57′18″N 81°56′17″W
- Area: 1.9 acres (0.77 ha)
- Built: 1886
- Architectural style: Queen Anne
- NRHP reference No.: 76001712
- Added to NRHP: October 2, 2009

Bishop William Wallace Duncan House, also known as the DuPre House, is a historic home located at Spartanburg, Spartanburg County, South Carolina. It was designed by G. L. Norrman and built about 1886. It is a two-story, asymmetrical, clapboard and cedar shingled dwelling in the Queen Anne style. It has a high-pitched roof pierced by six chimneys, a decorative mosaic tile front porch landing, a massive wood shingle-clad cylindrical tower, and stained glass windows. It was moved from its original location at 249 N. Church St. to its present location in November 1999.

It was listed on the National Register of Historic Places in 1976, delisted in 2005, and relisted in 2009.
