= Lawrence McNeill =

American businessman

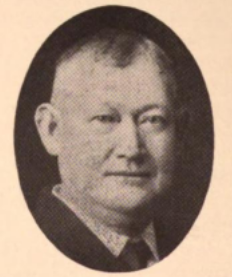
- McNeill, pictured around 1910
- Born: August 22, 1849; Robeson County, North Carolina
- Died: November 16, 1915 (aged 66)
- Resting place: Bonaventure Cemetery, Savannah, Georgia, U.S.
- Occupation: businessman
- Spouse: Florence Krenson McConnell (–1915; his death)

Lawrence McNeill (August 22, 1849 – November 16, 1915) was an American businessman, prominent in Savannah, Georgia. He was president of Savannah Lighting Company and Savannah Lumber Company, and was a director of the Citizens and Southern Bank, of Savannah, and the Atlantic National Bank, of Jacksonville, Florida.

== Life and career ==
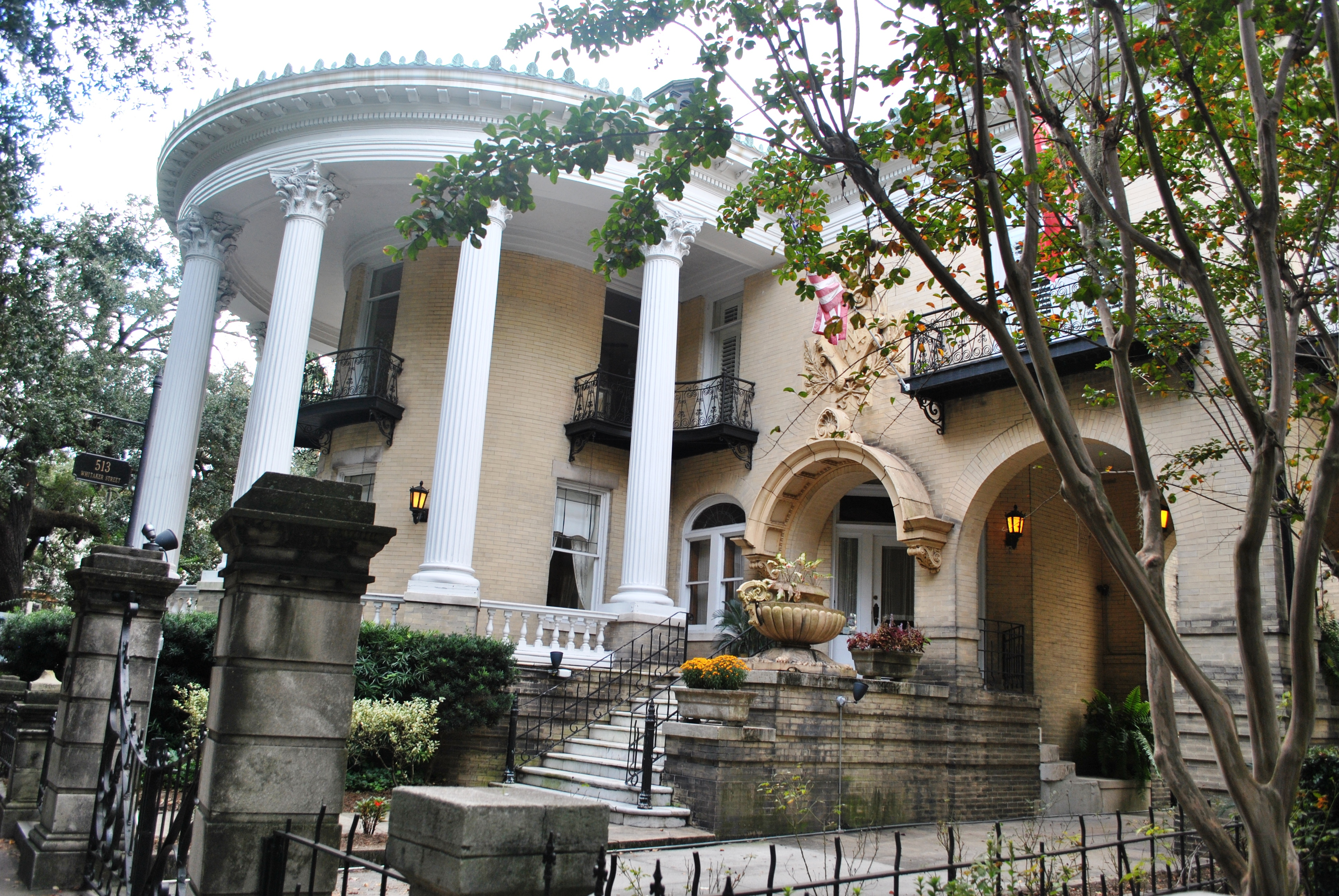
513 Whitaker Street in Savannah, Georgia, which McNeill had built in 1903

McNeill was born in 1849, on a plantation in Robeson County, North Carolina, to Laughlin McNeill and Mary Priscilla McEachern, both natives of North Carolina. His father was a farmer and planter for the majority of his career.

At the age of 27, he was working in the turpentine business in Beaufort County, South Carolina. Two years later, around 1879, he was in partnership in said industry with his twin brother Walter. Walter died in 1887, aged 37, at which point the firm dissolved.

In 1888, he entered the naval-store factorage business in Savannah, Georgia, as a partner in Peacock, Hunt & Co. He remained with them until 1903. In October 1903, he formed the Savannah Lumber Company with John J. Cummings and J. F. McEachern. He was its president until January 1, 1906, at which point he became its vice-president. He held the same role in the Chattahoochee Lumber Company, of Lela in Decatur County, Georgia, and in the Rodman Lumber Company, of Rodman, Florida. He was also a director of the Citizens and Southern Bank, of Savannah, and the Atlantic National Bank, of Jacksonville, Florida.

He established Savannah Lighting Company with Cummings in 1905, again with McNeill as president. Its power house was located at 54th and Montgomery Streets. Its rival company was Savannah Electric Company, whose president was George Johnson Baldwin.

In 1903, he had built what is now known as the Metts–McNeill House, at 513 Whitaker Street in Savannah, on the western side of Forsyth Park. Its architect was G. L. Norrman.

On January 17, 1905, he married Florence Krenson McConnell, daughter of Dr. William T. McConnell, of Marlow, Georgia, with whom he had one child: son Walter (1896–1977). They were both members of Savannah's Independent Presbyterian Church.

=== Death ===
McNeill died in 1915, aged 66. He is interred in Savannah's Bonaventure Cemetery, alongside his wife, who survived him by 31 years.
