= George Franklin Cooper =

American naval officer (1864–1953)

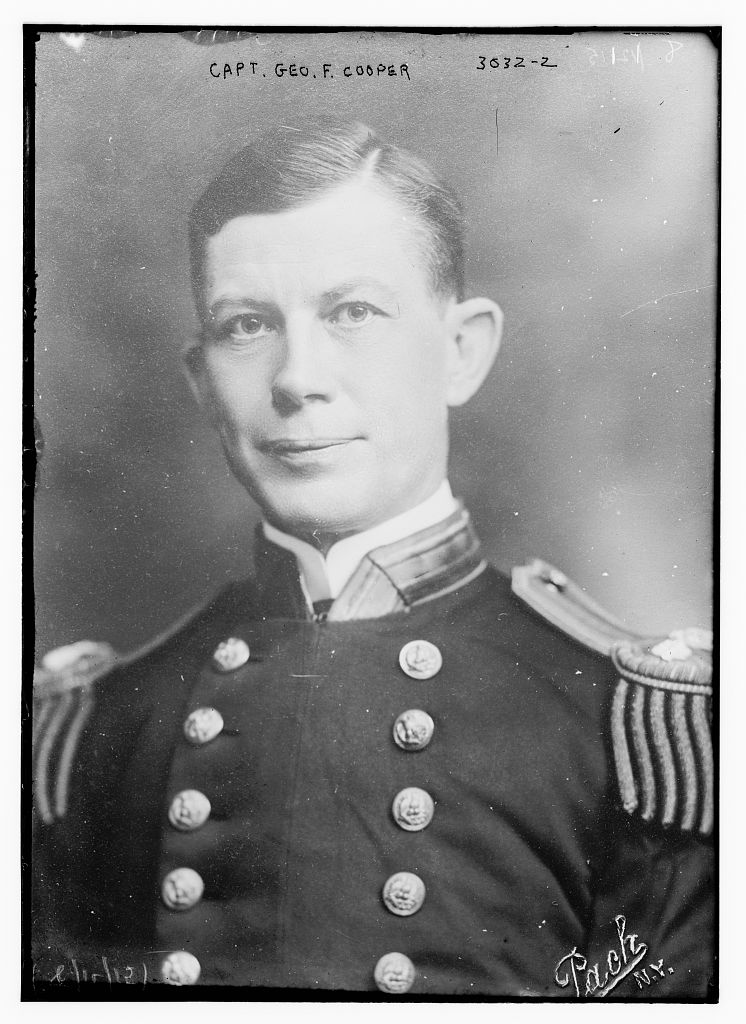
Cooper circa 1915

Capt. George Franklin Cooper Jr. (September 26, 1864 – May 6, 1953) was an American naval officer. He was a captain in the United States Navy; and was the commanding officer of the battleship USS Louisiana (BB-19) from May 1914 to June 1916 and during World War I.

== Biography ==
George Franklin Cooper was born on September 26, 1864, in Americus, Georgia. His father Dr. George Franklin Cooper Sr. (1825–1882) was a physician, Baptist minister, and founder of the public school system in his hometown of Americus. In 1886, Cooper graduated from the United States Naval Academy in Annapolis, Maryland.

He was appointed to the United States Navy in 1872. He served in World War I in the Fourth Naval District (headquartered at the Philadelphia Naval Shipyard), and was awarded the Navy Cross.

He died on May 6, 1953, in Philadelphia; and is buried at Arlington National Cemetery.
