= Americus, Georgia =

Americus
- City
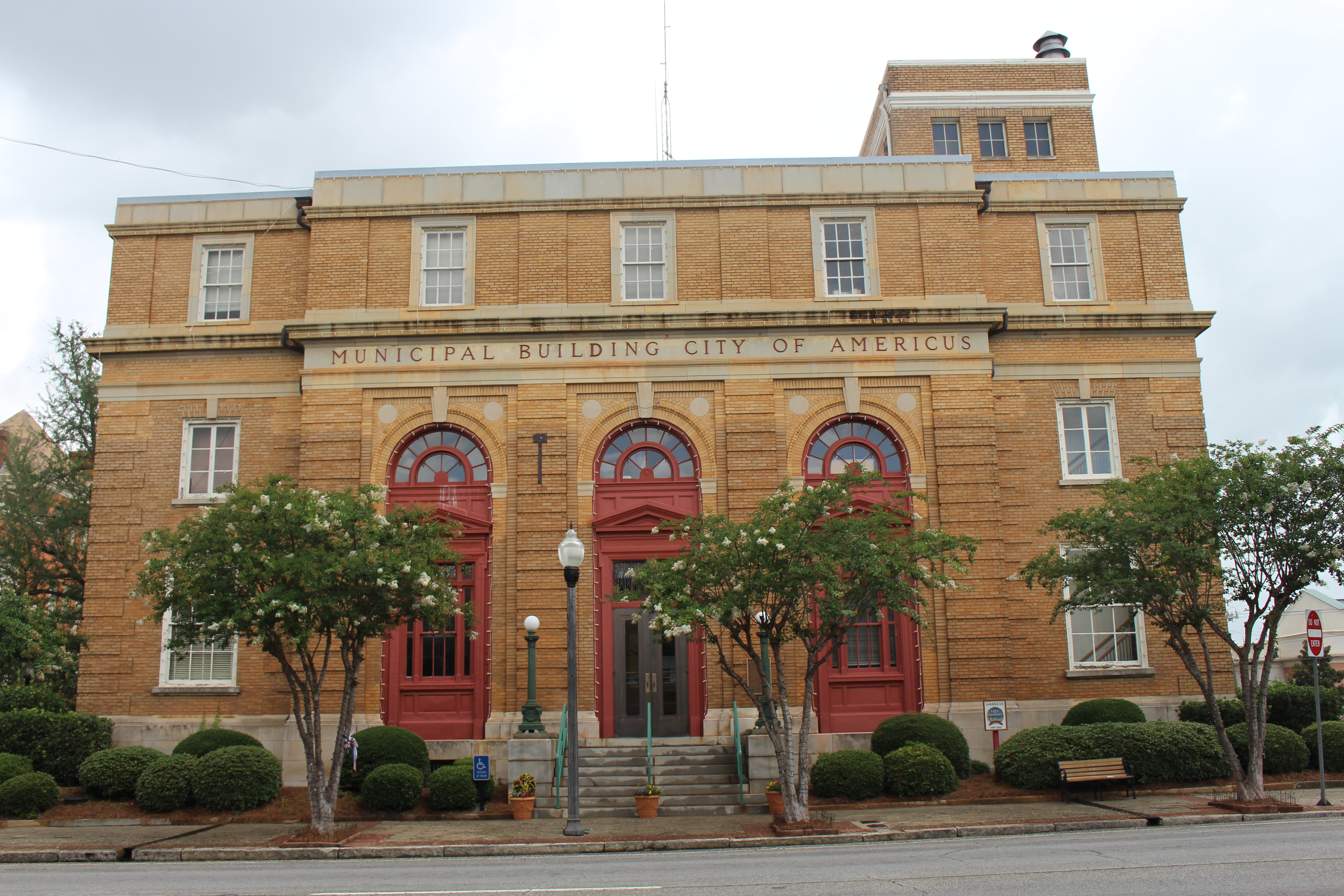
- Municipal Building in Americus

- Flag Seal

- Location in Sumter County and the state of Georgia

- Location of Americus Americus (the United States) Americus (North America)
- Coordinates: 32°4′31″N 84°13′36″W
- Country: United States
- State: Georgia
- County: Sumter

Area
  - Total: 11.57 sq mi (29.96 km^{2})
  - Land: 11.35 sq mi (29.40 km^{2})
  - Water: 0.22 sq mi (0.57 km^{2})
- Elevation: 479 ft (146 m)

Population (2020)
  - Total: 16,230
  - Density: 1,430.0/sq mi (552.13/km^{2})
- Time zone: UTC-5 (Eastern (EST))
  - Summer (DST): UTC-4 (EDT)
- ZIP codes: 31709, 31710, 31719
- Area code: 229
- FIPS code: 13-02116
- GNIS feature ID: 0331037
- Website: https://www.americusga.gov/

Americus is the county seat of Sumter County, Georgia, United States. As of the 2020 census, the city had a population of 16,230. It is the principal city of the Americus Micropolitan Statistical Area, a micropolitan area that covers Schley and Sumter counties and had a combined population of 36,966 at the 2000 census.

Habitat for Humanity was founded in Americus and its international headquarters is there, as well as The Fuller Center for Housing's international headquarters, Georgia Southwestern State University, the Windsor Hotel, The Rosalynn Carter Institute for Caregivers, and many other organizations. The city is notable for its rich history, including a large business and residential historic district, being one of the 29 places where Martin Luther King was jailed, the infamous Leesburg Stockade incident, and its close proximity to Jimmy Carter National Historical Park, Andersonville National Historic Site, and Koinonia Farm.

== History ==
=== Early years ===
For its first two decades, Americus was a small courthouse town. The Starksville Road, now Lee Street, was an important highway before the city was founded, and is now the location of many of the older buildings and homes listed in the Americus Historic District. The arrival of the railroad in 1854 and, three decades later, local attorney Samuel H. Hawkins' construction of the only privately financed railroad in state history made Americus the eighth largest city in Georgia into the 20th century. It was known as the "Metropolis of Southwest Georgia", a reflection of its status as a cotton distribution center.

In 1890, Georgia's first chartered electric street car system went into operation in Americus. One of its restored cars is on permanent display at the Lake Blackshear Regional Library, a gift from the Robert T. Crabb family who acquired the street car in the 1940s.

The town was already graced with an abundance of antebellum and Victorian architecture when local capitalists opened the Windsor Hotel in 1892. A five-story Queen Anne edifice, it was designed by a Swedish architect, Gottfried L. Norrman, in Atlanta. U.S. Vice President Thomas R. Marshall gave a speech from the balcony in 1917, and soon-to-be New York Governor and future U.S. President Franklin D. Roosevelt spoke in the dining room in 1928.

On January 1, 1976, the city center was listed on the National Register of Historic Places as the Americus Historic District; and the district boundaries were extended in 1979.

=== Into the 20th century ===
For the local minority community, Rev. Dr. Major W. Reddick established the Americus Institute (1897–1932). Booker T. Washington was a guest speaker there in May 1908. Rev. Alfred S. Staley was responsible for locating the state Masonic Orphanage in Americus, which served its function from 1898 to 1940. Both men engineered the unification of the General Missionary Baptist Convention of Georgia in 1915, the former as president and the latter as recording secretary. The public school named in honor of A.S. Staley was designated a National School of Excellence in 1990.

Two other colleges were also established in Americus, the Third District Agricultural and Mechanical School in 1906 (now Georgia Southwestern State University), and the South Georgia Trade and Vocational School in 1948 (now South Georgia Technical College). South Georgia Technical College is located on the original site of Souther Field.

In World War I, an Army Air Service training facility, Souther Field (now Jimmy Carter Regional Airport), was commissioned northeast of the city limits. Charles A. Lindbergh, the "Lone Eagle", bought his first airplane and made his first solo flight there during a two-week stay in May 1923. Recommissioned for World War II, Souther Field was used for RAF pilot training (1941–1942) as well as US pilot training before ending the war as a German prisoner-of-war camp. The town was incorporated in 1832, and the name Americus was picked out of a hat.

Shoeless Joe Jackson served as the field manager for the local baseball team after his banishment from professional baseball. A plaque at Thomas Bell Stadium commemorates his contribution to the local baseball program.

=== Race relations and the civil rights movement ===
In 1913, a young black man named Will Redding was lynched by a white mob. Redding refused the Chief of Police's order to stop loitering, was arrested, a struggle ensued, and ultimately Redding grabbed the Chief's gun and shot him. He was then chased down, shot, and put in jail. An angry mob went into the jail and tore down the door to Redding's cell, dragged him out onto Forsyth street, and beat him to death with crow bars and hammers.

Koinonia Farm, an interracial Christian community, was organized near Americus in 1942 by Clarence Jordan. Its interracial nature occasioned much opposition from local residents. A terrorist campaign of violence, intimidation, vandalism, and harassment by the Ku Klux Klan and others went on for the next 25 years, as well a boycott of Koinonia's products, such that by the late 1960s the once-thriving community was practically depopulated and essentially defunct. In the late 1960s Millard and Linda Fuller, with Clarence Jordan, revived Koinonia Farm and it thrived again. Miller and Fuller founded Habitat for Humanity International at Koinonia in 1976 before moving it into Americus the following year. In 2005, they founded The Fuller Center for Housing, also in Americus. Koinonia Farm remains in operation and is currently located southwest of Americus on Highway 49.

The civil rights era in Americus was a time of great turmoil. An uptown store which had refused to honor the Koinonia boycott was bombed in 1957. The Student Nonviolent Coordinating Committee (SNCCC) organized the peaceful protests and a voter registration drive, the Americus Movement. Rev. Dr. Martin Luther King Jr. spent a weekend in the courthouse jail in 1961, after an arrest in Albany.

In 1963 occurred the Leesburg Stockade incident. A group of African-American girls aged 12 to 15 were arrested in Americus after trying to buy movie tickets at a theatre's whites-only window, as a form of civil protest. At least fourteen girls were taken to a filthy "hellhole", an isolated prison in Leesburg, Georgia where they were held incommunicado for at least 45 days, in appalling conditions, without right of correspondence or legal representation, and with their families not knowing where they had been or disappeared to. Some weeks later, the girls were surreptitiously photographed by Danny Lyon who had learned the girls' location. The publishing of Lyon's photograph in the black press eventually brought the situation to national attention, and the girls were released some weeks later without ever having been charged with any crime.

In the same year of 1963, the local Sumter Movement to end racial segregation was organized and led by Rev. Joseph R. Campbell. Four of its activists were arrested under Georgia's 1871 Anti-Treason Act. A federal court ruled the law unconstitutional, establishing that peaceful protests could not be punishable by execution. Color barriers were first removed in 1965 when J.W. Jones and Henry L. Williams joined the Americus police force. Lewis M. Lowe was elected as the first black city councilman ten years later. With their election in 1995, Eloise R. Paschal and Eddie Rhea Walker broke the gender barrier on the city's governing body. In 1968, the last segregated black school in Americus was closed, A. S. Staley High School.

In 1971, the city was featured in a Marshall Frady article, "One Another Town", in Life magazine. The portrayal of the city's school integration was relatively benign, especially considering the community's history of troubled race relations.

=== 2007 tornado ===
Americus was hit by an EF3 tornado around 9:15 pm on March 1, 2007. The tornado was up to 1 mi-wide (1.6 km), and carved a 38 mi (61 km) path of destruction through the city and surrounding residential areas. It destroyed parts of Sumter Regional Hospital, forcing the evacuations of all of the patients there. There were two fatalities at a Hudson Street residence near the hospital; all SRH patients were evacuated safely. The hospital, however, faced major reconstruction issues and was eventually torn down. A new hospital, Phoebe Sumter, opened at a new location on the corner of US 19 and Highway 280 in December 2011.

Georgia Governor Sonny Perdue said, "It was worse that [sic] I had feared. The hospital was hit, but the devastation within the area of Sumter County and Americus was more than I imagined. The businesses around the hospital are totally destroyed. Power is still not restored in many places. It's just a blessing frankly that we didn't have more fatalities than we did." Over 500 homes were affected, with around 100 completely destroyed. Several businesses throughout the town were seriously damaged or destroyed as well.

President George W. Bush visited the area on March 3, calling what he saw "tough devastation."

== Geography ==
Americus is located at 32°4′31″N 84°13′36″W (32.075221, -84.226602).

According to the United States Census Bureau, the city has a total area of 10.7 square miles (28 km^{2}), of which 10.5 square miles (27 km^{2}) is land and 0.2 square miles (0.52 km^{2}) (1.87%) is water.

=== Climate ===
Climate data for Americus, Georgia, 1991–2020 normals, extremes 1891–2005
Month	Jan	Feb	Mar	Apr	May	Jun	Jul	Aug	Sep	Oct	Nov	Dec	Year
Record high °F (°C)	85 (29)	84 (29)	93 (34)	95 (35)	102 (39)	108 (42)	108 (42)	110 (43)	111 (44)	98 (37)	90 (32)	86 (30)	111 (44)
Mean daily maximum °F (°C)	59.0 (15.0)	62.6 (17.0)	69.8 (21.0)	76.5 (24.7)	84.2 (29.0)	89.0 (31.7)	90.8 (32.7)	90.4 (32.4)	86.5 (30.3)	77.9 (25.5)	68.1 (20.1)	61.0 (16.1)	76.3 (24.6)
Daily mean °F (°C)	46.9 (8.3)	50.2 (10.1)	56.4 (13.6)	63.0 (17.2)	71.4 (21.9)	77.7 (25.4)	80.4 (26.9)	79.8 (26.6)	75.3 (24.1)	65.5 (18.6)	55.1 (12.8)	49.1 (9.5)	64.2 (17.9)
Mean daily minimum °F (°C)	34.7 (1.5)	37.8 (3.2)	43.0 (6.1)	49.6 (9.8)	58.7 (14.8)	66.4 (19.1)	70.0 (21.1)	69.2 (20.7)	64.1 (17.8)	53.1 (11.7)	42.0 (5.6)	37.1 (2.8)	52.1 (11.2)
Record low °F (°C)	3 (−16)	4 (−16)	14 (−10)	28 (−2)	40 (4)	45 (7)	55 (13)	57 (14)	39 (4)	28 (−2)	12 (−11)	2 (−17)	2 (−17)
Average precipitation inches (mm)	4.69 (119)	4.72 (120)	4.68 (119)	4.78 (121)	3.12 (79)	4.79 (122)	5.95 (151)	4.62 (117)	4.40 (112)	2.71 (69)	3.50 (89)	5.39 (137)	53.35 (1,355)
Average snowfall inches (cm)	0.0 (0.0)	0.0 (0.0)	0.1 (0.25)	0.0 (0.0)	0.0 (0.0)	0.0 (0.0)	0.0 (0.0)	0.0 (0.0)	0.0 (0.0)	0.0 (0.0)	0.0 (0.0)	0.1 (0.25)	0.2 (0.5)
Average precipitation days (≥ 0.01 in)	9.5	8.8	8.6	7.4	6.8	11.3	12.1	10.7	7.4	5.6	7.6	9.3	105.1
Average snowy days (≥ 0.1 in)	0.1	0.0	0.0	0.0	0.0	0.0	0.0	0.0	0.0	0.0	0.0	0.0	0.1
Source 1: NOAA
Source 2: National Weather Service

== Demographics ==
Historical population
Census	Pop.	Note	%±
1870	3,259		—
1880	3,635		11.5%
1890	6,398		76.0%
1900	7,674		19.9%
1910	8,063		5.1%
1920	9,010		11.7%
1930	8,760		−2.8%
1940	9,281		5.9%
1950	11,389		22.7%
1960	13,472		18.3%
1970	16,091		19.4%
1980	16,120		0.2%
1990	16,512		2.4%
2000	17,013		3.0%
2010	17,041		0.2%
2020	16,230		−4.8%
U.S. Decennial Census; 1850-1870 1870-1880; 1890-1910 1920-1930; 1940 1950 1960; 1970 1980 1990; 2000 2010

=== 2020 census ===
As of the 2020 census, Americus had a population of 16,230. The median age was 33.4 years. 24.4% of residents were under the age of 18 and 15.4% of residents were 65 years of age or older. For every 100 females there were 85.0 males, and for every 100 females age 18 and over there were 80.2 males age 18 and over.

98.4% of residents lived in urban areas, while 1.6% lived in rural areas.

There were 6,429 households in Americus, including 3,557 families, of which 31.8% had children under the age of 18 living in them. Of all households, 25.2% were married-couple households, 20.3% were households with a male householder and no spouse or partner present, and 48.1% were households with a female householder and no spouse or partner present. About 34.9% of all households were made up of individuals and 13.7% had someone living alone who was 65 years of age or older.

There were 7,120 housing units, of which 9.7% were vacant. The homeowner vacancy rate was 2.7% and the rental vacancy rate was 6.3%.

Americus racial composition as of 2020
Race	Num.	Perc.
White (non-Hispanic)	4,382	27.0%
Black or African American (non-Hispanic)	10,079	62.1%
Native American	17	0.1%
Asian	394	2.43%
Pacific Islander	4	0.02%
Other/mixed	345	2.13%
Hispanic or Latino	1,009	6.22%

== Economy ==
=== Largest employers ===
According to the city's 2009 Comprehensive Annual Financial Report, the largest employers in the area were:

#	Employer	# of employees
1	Sumter County Schools	950
2	Eaton Cooper Lighting	600
3	Habitat for Humanity	400
4	Wal-Mart	399
5	Phoebe Sumter Medical Center	396
6	Magnolia Manor	375
7	Georgia Southwestern State University	280
8	Southern Star Community Services	253
9	Sumter County	235
10	City of Americus	195

== Education ==
=== Primary and secondary schools ===
The Sumter County School District holds grades pre-school to twelfth, which consist of one primary school and one elementary school, two middle schools, and two high schools. The district has 353 full-time teachers and over 5,774 students.

Elementary schools:

- Sumter County Primary School
- Sumter County Elementary School
- Sumter County Intermediate School

Secondary schools:

- Sumter County Middle School
- Sumter County High School

K-12 charter school:

- Furlow Charter School

K-12 private school:

- Southland Academy

=== Higher education ===
- Georgia Southwestern State University
- South Georgia Technical College

All schools and colleges are accredited by the Southern Association of Colleges and Schools (SACS).

=== Public libraries ===
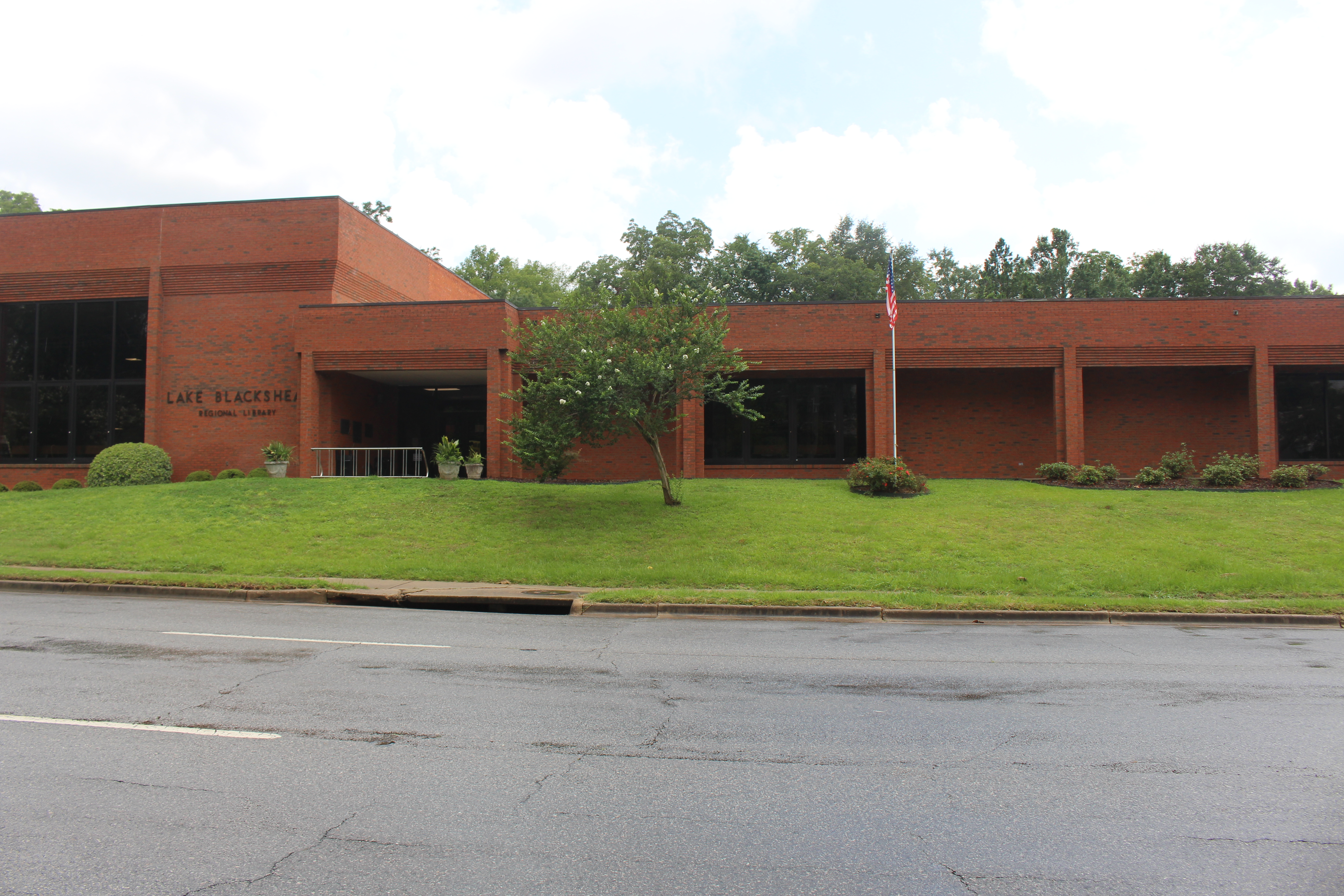
Lake Blackshear Regional Library of the Lake Blackshear Regional Library System

The community has the Lake Blackshear Regional Library, a part of the Lake Blackshear Regional Library System. It was temporarily relocated to a shirt factory warehouse also located in Americus after the tornado in 2007, but, once the reconstruction of the library finished around 2012, it was moved back to its original place.

== Notable places ==
- Americus Historic District; NRHP–listed
- Campbell Chapel A.M.E. Church, Americus; NRHP–listed
- Habitat for Humanity Global Village and Discovery Center, Americus
- Oak Grove Cemetery, Americus; NRHP contributing property

== Baseball ==
There have been eight minor league teams that have represented the city of Americus during 20 seasons spanning 1906–2002. Since classification of the minors began, seven of them have been labeled as class D loops and one played in an independent league. Several ballplayers for Americus teams subsequently played in the major leagues.

== Notable people ==
- Griffin Bell (1918–2009) judge, 72nd Attorney General of the United States, served under President Carter
- Hugh Carter Jr.
- Mike Cheokas (born 1953), politician
- Brent Cobb (born 1986) songwriter-singer
- Howell Cobb (1815–1868) politician; Confederate political figure
- Philip Cook (1817–1894) politician; general in the Confederate States Army
- Dr. George F. Cooper (1825–1882), physician, Baptist minister, and founder of the public school system in Americus
- Charles Frederick Crisp (1845–1896), English-born American politician, U.S. Congressman
- Charles Robert Crisp (1870–1937), U.S. Congressman
- Cassandra Pickett Durham (1824–1885) physician; the first woman to earn a medical degree in the U.S. state of Georgia
- Lonne Elder III (1927–1996) dramatist
- Millard Fuller (1935–2009) lawyer and humanitarian
- Chan Gailey (born 1952) football coach
- Jimmy Garrison
- Victor Green
- Lyman Hall (1859-1905), former academic administrator
- Dr. Shirley Green-Reese
- Kent Hill
- Moses Speer (1832-1898)
- George Hooks
- Alonzo Jackson
- Eddie Jackson
- Emma Rylander Lane (1856–1904), inventor of the Lane Cake
- Otis Leverette
- Angel Martino
- Joanna Moore (1934–1997), film and television actress
- Ruby Muhammad
- James Nabrit Jr.
- Leonard Pope
- Dan Reeves
- Mo Sanford (born 1966) baseball player; pitcher for the Cincinnati Reds, Colorado Rockies, and Minnesota Twins

== Gallery ==
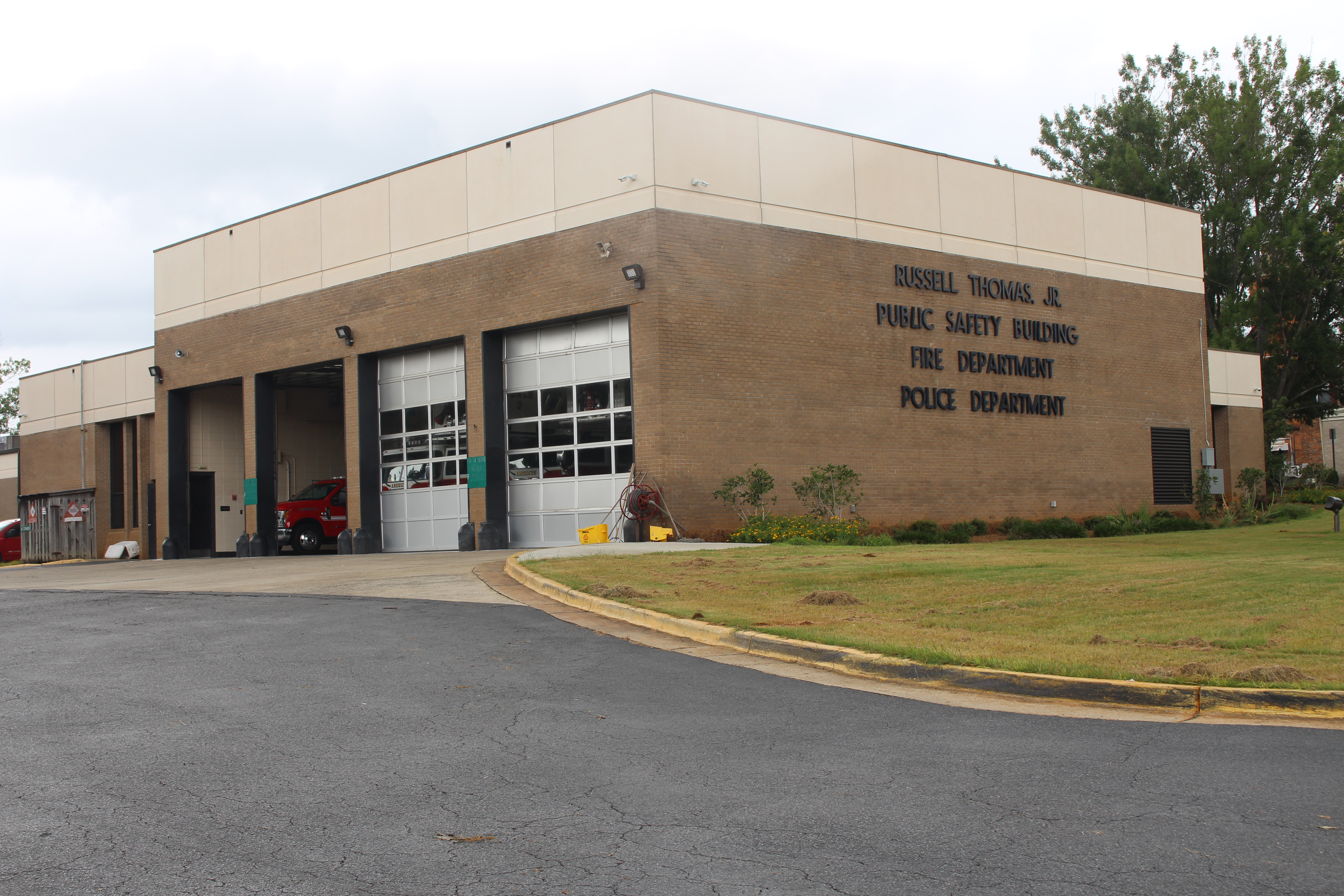
The Russell Thomas Jr. Public Safety Building houses the Americus police and fire departments.
