= Danny Lyon =

American photographer and filmmaker (born 1942)

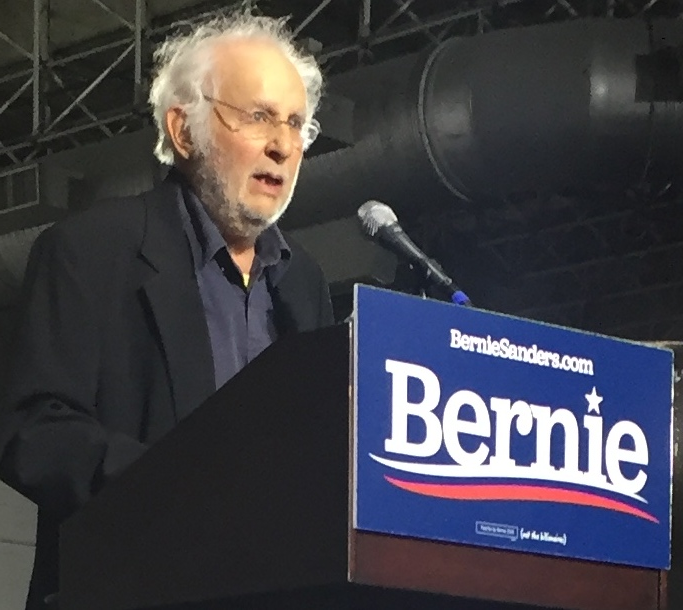
- Lyon speaks at a Bernie Sanders presidential rally in Chicago, March 2019
- Born: March 16, 1942 (age 84); Brooklyn, New York, U.S.
- Notable work: The Bikeriders, The Destruction of Lower Manhattan, Conversations With The Dead, I Like To Eat Right On The Dirt, Like A Thief's Dream, The Seventh Dog, Deep Sea Diver, Indian Nations
- Movement: New Journalism
- Website: www.bleakbeauty.com

Danny Lyon (born March 16, 1942) is an American photographer and filmmaker. His work has been shown in solo exhibits at the Whitney Museum of American Art, the Art Institute of Chicago, the Menil Collection, the M. H. de Young Memorial Museum in San Francisco and the Center for Creative Photography at the University of Arizona. Lyon twice received a Guggenheim Fellowship; a Rockefeller Fellowship, Missouri Honor Medal for Distinguished Service in Journalism; and a Lucie Award.

After being accepted as the photographer for Student Nonviolent Coordinating Committee (SNCC), Lyon was present at almost all of the major historical events during the Civil Rights Movement. All of Lyon's publications work in the style of photographic New Journalism.

== Early life ==
Lyon was born on 16 March 1942 in Brooklyn, New York. He is the son of Russian-Jewish mother Rebecca Henkin and German-Jewish father Dr. Ernst Fredrick Lyon. He was raised in Kew Gardens, Queens, and went on to study history and philosophy at the University of Chicago, where he graduated with a Bachelor of Arts degree in 1963.

== Career ==
Lyon began his involvement in the civil rights movement in 1962 when he hitch-hiked to Cairo, Illinois during a summer break after his junior year at the University of Chicago. He was inspired by a speech John Lewis had given at a church on his first day in Cairo. After his speech Lewis left to go attend a sit-in, Lyon was impressed by this, Lewis was putting action behind his words. Lyon then decided to march to a nearby segregated swimming pool, the demonstrators knelt down to pray as the pool-goers heckled them. Soon a truck came, it went through the crowd in an attempt to break it up, a young black girl was hit by the truck and Lyon knew that he wanted to be a part of the movement. For a time after this, in the 1960s, Lewis and Lyon were roommates.

In September 1962, with a $300 donation by Harry Belafonte, the Student Nonviolent Coordinating Committee (SNCC) flew Lyon to Jackson and the Mississippi Delta to cover voter registration workers. Shortly after, Lyon had a run-in with the police, one of whom threatened to kill him because when told they “didn’t mix the races down here”, Lyon claimed he had a Black grandfather. Lyon left town in order to keep all the pictures he had taken safe from being confiscated.

In 1963, Lyon returned, but the SNCC was reluctant to bring him aboard as their photographer. One job Lyon participated in was getting a picture of some high-school girls who were in prison at the Leesburg Stockade without any charges against them. He hid in the back of a car while someone else drove him to the prison, and the young man who drove distracted the guards while Lyon snuck in the back to get the photo.

After being accepted as the photographer for SNCC, Lyon was present at almost all of the major historical events during the movement capturing the moments with his camera.

His pictures appeared in The Movement: documentary of a struggle for equality, a documentary book about the Civil Rights Movement in the southern region of the United States. Lyon's work was also included in the 2025 exhibition Photography and the Black Arts Movement, 1955–1985 at the National Gallery of Art.

Later, Lyon began creating his own books. His first was a study of outlaw motorcyclists in the collection The Bikeriders (1968), where Lyon photographed, traveled with and shared the lifestyle of bikers in the American Midwest from 1963 to 1967. Living in a rented apartment in Woodlawn, Chicago, Lyon followed the Chicago chapter of the Outlaws Motorcycle Club in an "attempt to record and glorify the life of the American bikerider". Seeking advice from Hunter S. Thompson, who spent a year with the Hells Angels for his own book, Hell's Angels: The Strange and Terrible Saga of the Outlaw Motorcycle Gangs, Thompson warned Lyon that he should "get the hell out of that club unless it's absolutely necessary for photo action." Lyon said of Thompson's response: "He advised me not to join the Outlaws and to wear a helmet. I joined the club and seldom wore a helmet". He was a full-fledged member of the Outlaws between 1966 and 1967. On his time as an Outlaws member, Lyon said: "I was kind of horrified by the end. I remember I had a big disagreement with this guy who rolled out a huge Nazi flag as a picnic rug to put our beers on. By then I had realised that some of these guys were not so romantic after all".

The series was immensely popular and influential in the 1960s and 1970s. By 1967, Lyon was invited to join Magnum Photos. After The Bikeriders, he spent time documenting the lives of inmates in Texas prisons. During the 1970s, Lyon also contributed to the Environmental Protection Agency's DOCUMERICA project.

In 1969, when Lyon returned from his work in Texas to New York City, and had no place to live, the photographer Robert Frank, famous by then for his 1958 book The Americans, took him in. Lyon had met Frank two years earlier, at the end of a Happening that Lyon was part of, in New York City. Lyon lived with the Frank family for six months in the city, in an apartment on West 86th St.

The Destruction of Lower Manhattan (1969) was Lyon's next work, published by Macmillan Publishers in 1969. The book documents the large-scale demolition taking place throughout Lower Manhattan in 1967. Included are photographs of soon to be demolished streets and buildings, portraits of the neighborhood's last remaining stragglers and pictures from within the demolition sites themselves. The book was eventually remaindered for one dollar each, but soon attained the status of a collector's item. It was reprinted in 2005.

Conversations with the Dead (1971) was published with full cooperation of the Texas Department of Corrections. Lyon photographed in six prisons over a 14-month period in 1967–68. The series was printed in book form in 1971 by Holt publishing. The introduction points to a statement of purpose that the penal system of Texas is symbolic for incarceration everywhere. He states, "I tried with whatever power I had to make a picture of imprisonment as distressing as I knew it to be in reality."

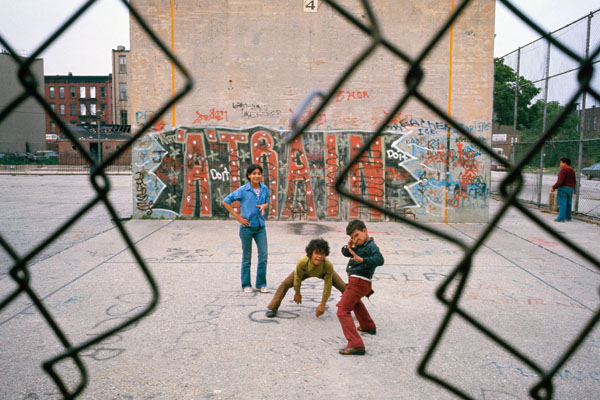
"Three boys and 'A Train' graffiti in Brooklyn's Lynch Park in New York City." By Danny Lyon, Brooklyn, NY, July 1974

Lyon befriended many of the prisoners. The book also includes texts taken from prison records, letters from convicts, and inmate artwork. In particular, the book focuses on the case of Billy McCune, a convicted rapist whose death sentence was eventually commuted to life in prison. In the foreword, Lyon describes McCune as a diagnosed psychotic, who one evening, while awaiting execution, "cut his penis off to the root and, placing it in a cup, passed it between the bars to the guard."

All of Lyon's publications work in the style of photographic New Journalism, meaning that the photographer has become immersed, and is a participant, of the documented subject.

He is the founding member of the publishing group Bleak Beauty. He was greatly encouraged in his photography by curator of the Art Institute of Chicago Hugh Edwards, who gave Lyon two solo exhibits as a young man.

Also a filmmaker and writer, Lyon's films and videos include Los Niños Abandonados, Born to Film, Willie, and Murderers. He has published the non-fiction book Like A Thief's Dream.

In his book Pictures from the New World (1981), he presents a photo series documenting American motorcyclists sexually assaulting and gang raping an anonymous woman.

== Publications ==
- The Movement: Documentary of a Struggle for Equality: Text by Lorraine Hansberry, photographs by Danny Lyon
  - New York: Simon and Schuster, 1964.
- The Bikeriders.
  - London: Macmillan, 1968.
  - Santa Fe, NM: Twin Palms, 1998. ISBN 978-0-944092-91-0.
  - New York City: Aperture, 2014. ISBN 978-1-59711-264-2. Facsimile edition.
- The Destruction of Lower Manhattan.
  - New York City: Macmillan, 1969.
  - New York City: PowerHouse, 2005.
- Conversations With The Dead.
  - New York City: Henry Holt and Company, 1971. ISBN 978-0030850691.
  - Conversations With The Dead: Photographs of Prison Life with the Letters and Drawings of Billy McCune #122054. ISBN 9780714870519. Digitally remastered facsimile edition with a new afterword by Lyon.
- Pictures from the New World. New York City: Aperture, 1981.
- I Like To Eat Right On The Dirt. Clintondale, NY: Bleak Beauty, 1989.
- Memories of the Southern Civil Rights Movement.
  - Memories of the Southern Civil Rights Movement. The Lyndhurst Series on the South. Center for Documentary Studies at Duke University; University of North Carolina, 1992. ISBN 9780807820544. Edited by Alex Harris.
  - Memories of the Southern Civil Rights Movement. Santa Fe, NM: Twin Palms, 2010. ISBN 9781931885881.
- Indian Nations. Twin Palms, 2002.
- Like A Thief's Dream. New York City: PowerHouse, 2007. Non-fiction book.
- Memories of Myself. London; New York City: Phaidon, 2009.
- Deep Sea Diver. London; New York City: Phaidon, 2011.
- The Seventh Dog. London; New York City: Phaidon, 2014.
- Burn Zone. Albuquerque, NM: Bleak Beauty. OCLC 962373165. With texts by Josephine Ferorelli.

== Films ==
- The Bikeriders (2023). Directed by Jeff Nichols, based on Lyon's The Bikeriders (1968).

== Partial Filmography ==
| Year | Name | Notes | Format |
|---|---|---|---|
| 1968 | Ramsey Cell Block and Ellis Shakedown | The interior of a cell block at the Ramsey Unit and a prison search or inspection at the Ellis Unit of the Texas prison system. | Two archival 16 mm sequences; approximately 4 minutes each; black-and-white; Texas |
| 1969 | Soc. Sci 127 (Social Sciences 127) | Bill Sanders, an eccentric tattoo artist operating a small tattoo parlor in Houston. | 21 minutes; 16 mm; color and black-and-white; Houston, Texas |
| 1970 | The Destiny of the Xerox Kid | Early experimental film featuring Danny Seymour, Lyon’s friend and fellow participant in New York’s independent filmmaking world. | 30 minutes; 16 mm; color; New York City |
| 1971 | Llanito | Everyday life in Bernalillo, particularly the lives of young Chicano residents, including Willie Jaramillo. | Approximately 52 minutes; 16 mm; black-and-white; Bernalillo, New Mexico |
| 1974 | El Mojado | Eddie Marquez Rivera, an undocumented Mexican worker from rural Chihuahua who became Lyon’s friend in New Mexico. | 16 mm; color; New Mexico |
| 1975 | Los Niños Abandonados (The Abandoned Children) | A group of homeless and abandoned boys living on the streets of Santa Marta, Colombia. | 63 minutes; 16 mm; color; Santa Marta, Colombia; Spanish with English subtitles |
| 1977 | Little Boy | New Mexico’s political and social landscape, partly centered on Willie Jaramillo following his release from prison. | 54 minutes; 16 mm; color; New Mexico |
| 1978 | El Otro Lado (The Other Side) | Mexican migrant agricultural workers traveling to the United States to work in Maricopa County’s citrus groves. | 60 minutes; 16 mm; color; Mexico and Arizona; primarily Spanish with English subtitles |
| 1985 | Willie | Willie Jaramillo’s adult life, imprisonment, family, and encounters with the criminal-justice system. | 80 minutes; 16 mm; color and black-and-white; New Mexico; with Nancy Weiss Lyon |

== Awards ==
- 1969: Guggenheim Fellowship from the John Simon Guggenheim Memorial Foundation
- 1978: Guggenheim Fellowship from the John Simon Guggenheim Memorial Foundation
- 1980s: Fellowship in Film making from the Rockefeller Foundation
- 2011: Missouri Honor Medal for Distinguished Service in Journalism, Missouri School of Journalism, University of Missouri, Columbia, MO
- 2015: Lucie Awards, "Achievement in Documentary" category
- 2022: Induction into the International Photography Hall of Fame and Museum.

== See also ==
- List of photographers of the civil rights movement
