= Long County High School =

Location
- 1844 Georgia Highway 57; Ludowici, Georgia 31316; United States; 31°41′26″N 81°43′45″W

Information
- Type: Public secondary
- School district: Long County School District
- Principal: Brian Thomas
- Teaching staff: 69.80 (FTE)
- Grades: 9–12
- Gender: Co-educational
- Enrollment: 1,353 (2024-2025)
- Student to teacher ratio: 19.38
- Colors: Columbia blue and white
- Slogan: Be The Tide
- Team name: Blue Tide
- Accreditation: Southern Association of Colleges and Schools
- Website: www.longcountyhs.com

Long County High School is a public high school located in Ludowici, Georgia, United States. The school is part of the Long County School District, which serves Long County.

== Notable alumni ==
- Tariq Carpenter, American football player
- Jamin Davis, American football player
- Dustin McGowan, baseball player
