= Tibet, Georgia =

- Unincorporated community
- Location within Georgia Location within the United States
- Coordinates: 31°37′26″N 81°35′53″W
- Country: United States
- State: Georgia
- County: Long
- Elevation: 56 ft (17 m)

Population (1912)
  - Total: 15
- Time zone: UTC-5 (Eastern (EST))
  - Summer (DST): UTC-4 (EDT)
- GNIS feature ID: 348281

Tibet is an unincorporated community in southeastern Long County, Georgia, United States. It lies 15 miles (24 km) south of Hinesville. Its elevation is 56 feet (17 m).

== History ==
A post office called Tibet was established in 1900, and remained in operation until 1914. Its population was estimated to be 15 in 1912. Tibet existed on the map as late as 1915, when it was part of Liberty County. As of July 1916, the community's closest access to banks and attorneys was in Darien, and since Tibet's post office closed, mail was supplied from Ludowici to the northwest. Tibet became part of the newly created Long County in 1920.

Tibet is located in Militia District 1544, which is also named Tibet.
