= Aimar, Georgia =

- Unincorporated community
- Location within Georgia Location within the United States
- Coordinates: 31°45′11″N 81°40′17″W
- Country: United States
- State: Georgia
- County: Long
- Elevation: 79 ft (24 m)

Population (1912)
  - Total: 100
- Time zone: UTC-5 (Eastern (EST))
  - Summer (DST): UTC-4 (EDT)
- GNIS feature ID: 348148

Aimar is an unincorporated community in northeastern Long County, Georgia, United States, located on U.S. Route 84 between the cities of Ludowici to the southwest and Walthourville to the northeast. Its elevation is 79 feet (24 m).

== History ==
A post office called Aimar was established in 1898, and remained in operation until 1913. At the time of the establishment of the community's post office, one of the lines of the Savannah, Florida and Western Railway passed through Aimar, which was part of Liberty County at the time. On July 14, 1908, Aimar filed a petition for a depot on the succeeding Atlantic Coast Line Railroad (ACL), which continued passing through the community as of 1955. After investigating the 1908 petition, the Railroad Commission of Georgia determined that the demands "were not sufficient in justifying an order requiring the erection of a depot at said point." The community had a railway station for the ACL. The population of Aimar was estimated to be 100 in 1912. When the post office closed, mail to Aimar was supplied from Ludowici as of 1915. As of 1916, the community's closest access to attorneys was in Jesup, and as of 1917, the closest access to banks was in Ludowici. Aimar became part of the newly created Long County in 1920.
