= Long Middle School =

Long Middle School can refer to:

- Dan F. Long Middle School, in Carrollton-Farmers Branch Independent School District, Dallas, Texas
- J.L. Long Middle School, in Dallas Independent School District, Dallas, Texas
- Jane Long Middle School (Houston), in Houston Independent School District, Houston, Texas
- Jane Long Middle School, in Bryan Independent School District, Bryan, Texas
- Long County Middle School, in Long County School District, Ludowici, Georgia
