= 1928 United States presidential election in Georgia =

- November 6, 1928

| Nominee | Al Smith | Herbert Hoover |
| Party | Democratic | Republican |
| Alliance | | Anti-Smith Democratic |
| Home state | New York | California |
| Running mate | Joseph T. Robinson | Charles Curtis |
| Electoral vote | 14 | 0 |
| Popular vote | 129,602 | 99,368 |
| Percentage | 56.56% | 43.36% |
County results
Smith
50–60%
60–70%
70–80%
80–90%
90–100%
Hoover
50–60%
60–70%
70–80%
80–90%
President before election
Calvin Coolidge
Republican
Elected President
Herbert Hoover
Republican

The 1928 United States presidential election in Georgia took place on November 6, 1928, as part of the wider United States presidential election. Voters chose 14 representatives, or electors, to the Electoral College, who voted for president and vice president.

With the exception of a handful of historically Unionist North Georgia counties – chiefly Fannin but also to a lesser extent Pickens, Gilmer and Towns – Georgia since the 1880s had been a one-party state dominated by the Democratic Party. Disfranchisement of virtually all African-Americans and most poor whites had made the Republican Party virtually nonexistent outside of local governments in those few upcountry counties, and the national Democratic Party served as the guardian of white supremacy against a Republican Party historically associated with memories of Reconstruction. The only competitive elections were Democratic primaries, which state laws restricted to whites on the grounds of the Democratic Party being legally a private club.

However, with all other prominent Democrats sitting the election out, the party nominated Alfred E. Smith, four-term Governor of New York as its nominee for 1928, with little opposition. Smith had been the favorite for the 1924 nomination, but had lost due to opposition to his Catholic faith and "wet" views on Prohibition: he wished to repeal or modify the Volstead Act.

Once Smith was nominated – despite his attempt to dispel fears by nominating "dry" Southern Democrat Joseph T. Robinson as his running mate – extreme fear ensued in the South, which had no experience of the Southern and Eastern European Catholic immigrants who were Smith's local constituency. Southern fundamentalist Protestants believed that Smith would allow papal and priestly leadership in the United States, which Protestantism was a reaction against.

Prior to this election, Georgia was, along with Texas, the only state that had never voted Republican for president, even during Reconstruction. In Georgia, many Protestant ministers were strongly opposed to Smith. However, with the state's large number of majority-black counties, there was great opposition to Hoover because of the strong Republican association with Reconstruction and black political power.

The Smith/Robinson ticket carried the state of Georgia on election day, making Georgia– with Texas simultaneously voting Republican for the first time– now the only state to have never voted for a Republican presidential candidate. Nonetheless, Hoover did achieve the second best GOP presidential performance at the time, after Ulysses S. Grant in 1872. Both vote percentages would not be beaten until Barry Goldwater carried the state in 1964, by when the national Democratic Party had become firmly linked with black civil rights.

As in the rest of the South, Hoover's gains were largely confined to areas with few blacks, where he gained up to fifty percent in Forsyth and Wilkes counties, and in other northern upcountry counties he gained over forty percent. Nevertheless, unlike most Black Belt areas where there was no pro-Hoover trend, in some heavily black counties like Long, Effingham, and McDuffie, where the white voting population was substantially German Lutheran and intensely hostile to Catholicism, Hoover did make large gains, meaning that Georgia was one of only two states where any counties with nonvoting black majorities deserted Smith. Hoover also made large gains from the newly developing urban middle class in Atlanta and Augusta, where his gains on Coolidge were comparable to the most anti-Catholic upcountry areas.

== Results ==
At the time, Georgia voters technically voted on their ballots for a slate of presidential electors, not for the candidates themselves, with each party selecting one elector to represent each of the state's 12 congressional districts, plus two at-large electors, for a total slate of 14 electors. Therefore, the vote totals for each presidential candidate here are equal to that of the individual elector who received the highest number of votes for their respective party.

1928 United States presidential election in Georgia
| Party | Candidate | Votes | Percentage | Electoral votes |
|---|---|---|---|---|
| Democratic | Al Smith | 129,602 | 56.56% | 14 |
| Republican | Herbert Hoover | 99,368 (Note: Hoover vote is a fusion of Republican and Anti-Smith Democratic votes. Hoover received 63,498 Republican votes and 35,870 Anti-Smith Democrat votes.) | 43.36% | 0 |
| Socialist | Norman Thomas | 124 (Note: These write-in votes were not separated by county and only given as a statewide total.) | 0.05% | 0 |
| Workers (Communist) | William Foster | 64 | 0.03% | 0 |

=== Results by individual elector ===
State at-large
| Candidate | Party | Votes | % |
|---|---|---|---|
| John S. Candler | Democratic Party | 129,602 | 28.28 |
| C. C. Brantley | Democratic Party | 129,595 | 28.28 |
| Charles Adamson | Republican Party | 63,498 | 13.85 |
| Charles Adamson | Anti-Smith Democratic | 35,870 | 7.83 |
| Charles Adamson | Total | 99,368 | 21.68 |
| Mary Harris Armor | Republican Party | 63,495 | 13.85 |
| Mary Harris Armor | Anti-Smith Democratic | 35,871 | 7.83 |
| Mary Harris Armor | Total | 99,366 | 21.68 |
| James M. Elder | Socialist Party of America | 124 | 0.03 |
| M. Raoul Millis | Socialist Party of America | 124 | 0.03 |
| L. W. War | Workers (Communist) Party | 64 | 0.01 |
| C. S. Knight | Workers (Communist) Party | 64 | 0.01 |
| Total | | 458,307 | 100.00 |

From the 1st congressional district
| Candidate | Party | Votes | % |
|---|---|---|---|
| Samuel B. Adams | Democratic Party | 129,593 | 56.57 |
| Frank Durden | Republican Party | 63,449 | 27.70 |
| Frank Durden | Anti-Smith Democratic | 35,850 | 15.65 |
| Frank Durden | Total | 99,299 | 43.35 |
| Henry Applebaum | Socialist Party of America | 124 | 0.05 |
| Ernest Carl Fullerton | Workers (Communist) Party | 64 | 0.03 |
| Total | | 229,080 | 100.00 |

From the 2nd congressional district
| Candidate | Party | Votes | % |
|---|---|---|---|
| L. D. Passmore | Democratic Party | 129,587 | 56.57 |
| J. M. Patterson | Republican Party | 63,452 | 27.70 |
| J. M. Patterson | Anti-Smith Democratic | 35,851 | 15.65 |
| J. M. Patterson | Total | 99,303 | 43.35 |
| Mildred Hicks | Socialist Party of America | 124 | 0.05 |
| Max Singer | Workers (Communist) Party | 64 | 0.03 |
| Total | | 229,078 | 100.00 |

From the 3rd congressional district
| Candidate | Party | Votes | % |
|---|---|---|---|
| E. A. Rogers | Democratic Party | 129,588 | 56.57 |
| Charles E. Brown | Republican Party | 63,452 | 27.70 |
| Charles E. Brown | Anti-Smith Democratic | 35,850 | 15.65 |
| Charles E. Brown | Total | 99,302 | 43.35 |
| D. J. Eddridge | Socialist Party of America | 124 | 0.05 |
| Denny G. Katz | Workers (Communist) Party | 64 | 0.03 |
| Total | | 229,078 | 100.00 |

From the 4th congressional district
| Candidate | Party | Votes | % |
|---|---|---|---|
| W. R. Jones | Democratic Party | 129,598 | 56.57 |
| Henry O. Lovvorn | Republican Party | 63,494 | 27.72 |
| Henry O. Lovvorn | Anti-Smith Democratic | 35,867 | 15.66 |
| Henry O. Lovvorn | Total | 99,361 | 43.37 |
| J. F. Ligon | Socialist Party of America | 124 | 0.05 |
| S. J. Letheis | Workers (Communist) Party | 64 | 0.03 |
| Total | | 229,147 | 100.00 |

From the 5th congressional district
| Candidate | Party | Votes | % |
|---|---|---|---|
| Edgar Watkins Sr. | Democratic Party | 129,591 | 56.57 |
| Mrs. Marvin Williams | Republican Party | 63,450 | 27.70 |
| Mrs. Marvin Williams | Anti-Smith Democratic | 35,853 | 15.65 |
| Mrs. Marvin Williams | Total | 99,303 | 43.35 |
| Mary Krause | Socialist Party of America | 124 | 0.05 |
| Nathan Mazer | Workers (Communist) Party | 64 | 0.03 |
| Total | | 229,082 | 100.00 |

From the 6th congressional district
| Candidate | Party | Votes | % |
|---|---|---|---|
| Edgar Blalock | Democratic Party | 129,592 | 56.57 |
| George S. Jones | Republican Party | 63,452 | 27.70 |
| George S. Jones | Anti-Smith Democratic | 35,850 | 15.65 |
| George S. Jones | Total | 99,302 | 43.35 |
| T. J. Herrington | Socialist Party of America | 124 | 0.05 |
| Adam Wehmer | Workers (Communist) Party | 64 | 0.03 |
| Total | | 229,082 | 100.00 |

From the 7th congressional district
| Candidate | Party | Votes | % |
|---|---|---|---|
| N. A. Morris | Democratic Party | 129,591 | 56.57 |
| Fred D. Noble | Republican Party | 63,450 | 27.70 |
| Fred D. Noble | Anti-Smith Democratic | 35,851 | 15.65 |
| Fred D. Noble | Total | 99,301 | 43.35 |
| Frederick Tippens | Socialist Party of America | 124 | 0.05 |
| Sam Nasson | Workers (Communist) Party | 64 | 0.03 |
| Total | | 229,080 | 100.00 |

From the 8th congressional district
| Candidate | Party | Votes | % |
|---|---|---|---|
| Ernest Camp | Democratic Party | 129,592 | 56.57 |
| Mrs. C. A. Vernoy | Republican Party | 63,450 | 27.70 |
| Mrs. C. A. Vernoy | Anti-Smith Democratic | 35,853 | 15.65 |
| Mrs. C. A. Vernoy | Total | 99,303 | 43.35 |
| Emily Hay | Socialist Party of America | 124 | 0.05 |
| H. C. Boatner | Workers (Communist) Party | 64 | 0.03 |
| Total | | 229,083 | 100.00 |

From the 9th congressional district
| Candidate | Party | Votes | % |
|---|---|---|---|
| B. P. Gaillard | Democratic Party | 129,591 | 56.57 |
| W. A. Carlisle | Republican Party | 63,452 | 27.70 |
| W. A. Carlisle | Anti-Smith Democratic | 35,850 | 15.65 |
| W. A. Carlisle | Total | 99,302 | 43.35 |
| W. W. Edwards | Socialist Party of America | 124 | 0.05 |
| Harry Harains | Workers (Communist) Party | 64 | 0.03 |
| Total | | 229,081 | 100.00 |

From the 10th congressional district
| Candidate | Party | Votes | % |
|---|---|---|---|
| E. A. Tigner | Democratic Party | 129,592 | 56.57 |
| E. J. Forrester | Republican Party | 63,460 | 27.70 |
| E. J. Forrester | Anti-Smith Democratic | 35,853 | 15.65 |
| E. J. Forrester | Total | 99,313 | 43.35 |
| W. B. Wall | Socialist Party of America | 124 | 0.05 |
| W. G. McCoy | Workers (Communist) Party | 64 | 0.03 |
| Total | | 229,093 | 100.00 |

From the 11th congressional district
| Candidate | Party | Votes | % |
|---|---|---|---|
| John W. Bennett | Democratic Party | 129,591 | 56.57 |
| Dan T. Cowart | Republican Party | 63,451 | 27.70 |
| Dan T. Cowart | Anti-Smith Democratic | 35,851 | 15.65 |
| Dan T. Cowart | Total | 99,302 | 43.35 |
| T. H. Blizzard | Socialist Party of America | 124 | 0.05 |
| O. R. Hutchinson | Workers (Communist) Party | 64 | 0.03 |
| Total | | 229,081 | 100.00 |

From the 12th congressional district
| Candidate | Party | Votes | % |
|---|---|---|---|
| J. W. Palmer | Democratic Party | 129,592 | 56.57 |
| J. H. Rush | Republican Party | 63,452 | 27.70 |
| J. H. Rush | Anti-Smith Democratic | 35,845 | 15.65 |
| J. H. Rush | Total | 99,297 | 43.35 |
| S. A. Alexander | Socialist Party of America | 124 | 0.05 |
| J. K. Eiseler | Workers (Communist) Party | 64 | 0.03 |
| Total | | 229,077 | 100.00 |

=== Results by county ===
| County | Alfred Emmanuel Smith Democratic | | Herbert Clark Hoover Republican/“Anti-Smith” | | Margin | | Total votes cast |
| County | # | % | # | % | # | % | Total votes cast |
|---|---|---|---|---|---|---|---|
| Appling | 415 | 41.75% | 579 | 58.25% | -164 | -16.50% | 994 |
| Atkinson | 350 | 74.31% | 121 | 25.69% | 229 | 48.62% | 471 |
| Bacon | 305 | 60.04% | 203 | 39.96% | 102 | 20.08% | 508 |
| Baker | 462 | 82.35% | 99 | 17.65% | 363 | 64.71% | 561 |
| Baldwin | 712 | 72.51% | 270 | 27.49% | 442 | 45.01% | 982 |
| Banks | 422 | 53.76% | 363 | 46.24% | 59 | 7.52% | 785 |
| Barrow | 479 | 41.19% | 684 | 58.81% | -205 | -17.63% | 1,163 |
| Bartow | 830 | 49.76% | 838 | 50.24% | -8 | -0.48% | 1,668 |
| Ben Hill | 1,006 | 68.62% | 460 | 31.38% | 546 | 37.24% | 1,466 |
| Berrien | 735 | 87.50% | 105 | 12.50% | 630 | 75.00% | 840 |
| Bibb | 2,289 | 52.42% | 2,078 | 47.58% | 211 | 4.83% | 4,367 |
| Bleckley | 641 | 90.03% | 71 | 9.97% | 570 | 80.06% | 712 |
| Brantley | 166 | 49.11% | 172 | 50.89% | -6 | -1.78% | 338 |
| Brooks | 770 | 80.04% | 192 | 19.96% | 578 | 60.08% | 962 |
| Bryan | 219 | 59.19% | 151 | 40.81% | 68 | 18.38% | 370 |
| Bulloch | 1,258 | 76.47% | 387 | 23.53% | 871 | 52.95% | 1,645 |
| Burke | 687 | 72.54% | 260 | 27.46% | 427 | 45.09% | 947 |
| Butts | 846 | 85.11% | 148 | 14.89% | 698 | 70.22% | 994 |
| Calhoun | 571 | 86.25% | 91 | 13.75% | 480 | 72.51% | 662 |
| Camden | 274 | 50.65% | 267 | 49.35% | 7 | 1.29% | 541 |
| Campbell | 425 | 56.52% | 327 | 43.48% | 98 | 13.03% | 752 |
| Candler | 411 | 75.55% | 133 | 24.45% | 278 | 51.10% | 544 |
| Carroll | 1,913 | 47.53% | 2,112 | 52.47% | -199 | -4.94% | 4,025 |
| Catoosa | 562 | 48.16% | 605 | 51.84% | -43 | -3.68% | 1,167 |
| Charlton | 415 | 72.17% | 160 | 27.83% | 255 | 44.35% | 575 |
| Chatham | 5,534 | 51.14% | 5,288 | 48.86% | 246 | 2.27% | 10,822 |
| Chattahoochee | 141 | 88.68% | 18 | 11.32% | 123 | 77.36% | 159 |
| Chattooga | 920 | 45.63% | 1,096 | 54.37% | -176 | -8.73% | 2,016 |
| Cherokee | 581 | 25.71% | 1,679 | 74.29% | -1,098 | -48.58% | 2,260 |
| Clarke | 1,407 | 66.03% | 724 | 33.97% | 683 | 32.05% | 2,131 |
| Clay | 405 | 87.85% | 56 | 12.15% | 349 | 75.70% | 461 |
| Clayton | 612 | 49.72% | 619 | 50.28% | -7 | -0.57% | 1,231 |
| Clinch | 717 | 83.37% | 143 | 16.63% | 574 | 66.74% | 860 |
| Cobb | 1,426 | 45.46% | 1,711 | 54.54% | -285 | -9.09% | 3,137 |
| Coffee | 1,176 | 66.55% | 591 | 33.45% | 585 | 33.11% | 1,767 |
| Colquitt | 970 | 54.93% | 796 | 45.07% | 174 | 9.85% | 1,766 |
| Columbia | 279 | 54.39% | 234 | 45.61% | 45 | 8.77% | 513 |
| Cook | 689 | 74.41% | 237 | 25.59% | 452 | 48.81% | 926 |
| Coweta | 1,656 | 87.85% | 229 | 12.15% | 1,427 | 75.70% | 1,885 |
| Crawford | 358 | 88.18% | 48 | 11.82% | 310 | 76.35% | 406 |
| Crisp | 523 | 56.54% | 402 | 43.46% | 121 | 13.08% | 925 |
| Dade | 453 | 58.00% | 328 | 42.00% | 125 | 16.01% | 781 |
| Dawson | 332 | 53.38% | 290 | 46.62% | 42 | 6.75% | 622 |
| Decatur | 734 | 38.84% | 1,156 | 61.16% | -422 | -22.33% | 1,890 |
| DeKalb | 2,293 | 49.09% | 2,378 | 50.91% | -85 | -1.82% | 4,671 |
| Dodge | 677 | 71.26% | 273 | 28.74% | 404 | 42.53% | 950 |
| Dooly | 744 | 82.67% | 156 | 17.33% | 588 | 65.33% | 900 |
| Dougherty | 982 | 72.15% | 379 | 27.85% | 603 | 44.31% | 1,361 |
| Douglas | 452 | 42.72% | 606 | 57.28% | -154 | -14.56% | 1,058 |
| Early | 674 | 74.48% | 231 | 25.52% | 443 | 48.95% | 905 |
| Echols | 314 | 91.55% | 29 | 8.45% | 285 | 83.09% | 343 |
| Effingham | 163 | 20.63% | 627 | 79.37% | -464 | -58.73% | 790 |
| Elbert | 1,052 | 53.05% | 931 | 46.95% | 121 | 6.10% | 1,983 |
| Emanuel | 1,076 | 75.19% | 355 | 24.81% | 721 | 50.38% | 1,431 |
| Evans | 489 | 71.81% | 192 | 28.19% | 297 | 43.61% | 681 |
| Fannin | 811 | 31.92% | 1,730 | 68.08% | -919 | -36.17% | 2,541 |
| Fayette | 367 | 65.89% | 190 | 34.11% | 177 | 31.78% | 557 |
| Floyd | 1,494 | 46.34% | 1,730 | 53.66% | -236 | -7.32% | 3,224 |
| Forsyth | 287 | 23.51% | 934 | 76.49% | -647 | -52.99% | 1,221 |
| Franklin | 770 | 49.01% | 801 | 50.99% | -31 | -1.97% | 1,571 |
| Fulton | 8,872 | 48.64% | 9,368 | 51.36% | -496 | -2.72% | 18,240 |
| Gilmer | 529 | 34.33% | 1,012 | 65.67% | -483 | -31.34% | 1,541 |
| Glascock | 123 | 35.34% | 225 | 64.66% | -102 | -29.31% | 348 |
| Glynn | 549 | 40.73% | 799 | 59.27% | -250 | -18.55% | 1,348 |
| Gordon | 740 | 41.60% | 1,039 | 58.40% | -299 | -16.81% | 1,779 |
| Grady | 1,172 | 72.75% | 439 | 27.25% | 733 | 45.50% | 1,611 |
| Greene | 627 | 71.90% | 245 | 28.10% | 382 | 43.81% | 872 |
| Gwinnett | 970 | 47.74% | 1,062 | 52.26% | -92 | -4.53% | 2,032 |
| Habersham | 1,105 | 44.04% | 1,404 | 55.96% | -299 | -11.92% | 2,509 |
| Hall | 1,523 | 49.19% | 1,573 | 50.81% | -50 | -1.61% | 3,096 |
| Hancock | 552 | 82.39% | 118 | 17.61% | 434 | 64.78% | 670 |
| Haralson | 690 | 30.84% | 1,547 | 69.16% | -857 | -38.31% | 2,237 |
| Harris | 551 | 79.28% | 144 | 20.72% | 407 | 58.56% | 695 |
| Hart | 919 | 60.38% | 603 | 39.62% | 316 | 20.76% | 1,522 |
| Heard | 493 | 55.83% | 390 | 44.17% | 103 | 11.66% | 883 |
| Henry | 763 | 67.94% | 360 | 32.06% | 403 | 35.89% | 1,123 |
| Houston | 323 | 77.83% | 92 | 22.17% | 231 | 55.66% | 415 |
| Irwin | 917 | 84.99% | 162 | 15.01% | 755 | 69.97% | 1,079 |
| Jackson | 859 | 51.22% | 818 | 48.78% | 41 | 2.44% | 1,677 |
| Jasper | 632 | 81.87% | 140 | 18.13% | 492 | 63.73% | 772 |
| Jeff Davis | 315 | 63.64% | 180 | 36.36% | 135 | 27.27% | 495 |
| Jefferson | 798 | 43.02% | 1,057 | 56.98% | -259 | -13.96% | 1,855 |
| Jenkins | 409 | 55.20% | 332 | 44.80% | 77 | 10.39% | 741 |
| Johnson | 632 | 69.00% | 284 | 31.00% | 348 | 37.99% | 916 |
| Jones | 414 | 80.54% | 100 | 19.46% | 314 | 61.09% | 514 |
| Lamar | 672 | 84.21% | 126 | 15.79% | 546 | 68.42% | 798 |
| Lanier | 303 | 68.71% | 138 | 31.29% | 165 | 37.41% | 441 |
| Laurens | 1,987 | 80.87% | 470 | 19.13% | 1,517 | 61.74% | 2,457 |
| Lee | 287 | 86.45% | 45 | 13.55% | 242 | 72.89% | 332 |
| Liberty | 201 | 49.75% | 203 | 50.25% | -2 | -0.50% | 404 |
| Lincoln | 445 | 51.86% | 413 | 48.14% | 32 | 3.73% | 858 |
| Long | 166 | 29.28% | 401 | 70.72% | -235 | -41.45% | 567 |
| Lowndes | 1,413 | 70.33% | 596 | 29.67% | 817 | 40.67% | 2,009 |
| Lumpkin | 560 | 59.51% | 381 | 40.49% | 179 | 19.02% | 941 |
| Macon | 819 | 76.04% | 258 | 23.96% | 561 | 52.09% | 1,077 |
| Madison | 474 | 47.35% | 527 | 52.65% | -53 | -5.29% | 1,001 |
| Marion | 365 | 76.20% | 114 | 23.80% | 251 | 52.40% | 479 |
| McDuffie | 304 | 44.38% | 381 | 55.62% | -77 | -11.24% | 685 |
| McIntosh | 141 | 43.93% | 180 | 56.07% | -39 | -12.15% | 321 |
| Meriwether | 1,515 | 84.07% | 287 | 15.93% | 1,228 | 68.15% | 1,802 |
| Miller | 322 | 76.12% | 101 | 23.88% | 221 | 52.25% | 423 |
| Milton | 183 | 29.19% | 444 | 70.81% | -261 | -41.63% | 627 |
| Mitchell | 1,358 | 90.47% | 143 | 9.53% | 1,215 | 80.95% | 1,501 |
| Monroe | 801 | 70.88% | 329 | 29.12% | 472 | 41.77% | 1,130 |
| Montgomery | 337 | 77.47% | 98 | 22.53% | 239 | 54.94% | 435 |
| Morgan | 803 | 79.43% | 208 | 20.57% | 595 | 58.85% | 1,011 |
| Murray | 982 | 47.03% | 1,106 | 52.97% | -124 | -5.94% | 2,088 |
| Muscogee | 2,098 | 57.14% | 1,574 | 42.86% | 524 | 14.27% | 3,672 |
| Newton | 873 | 55.57% | 698 | 44.43% | 175 | 11.14% | 1,571 |
| Oconee | 344 | 53.42% | 300 | 46.58% | 44 | 6.83% | 644 |
| Oglethorpe | 813 | 79.86% | 205 | 20.14% | 608 | 59.72% | 1,018 |
| Paulding | 690 | 34.66% | 1,301 | 65.34% | -611 | -30.69% | 1,991 |
| Peach | 572 | 73.33% | 208 | 26.67% | 364 | 46.67% | 780 |
| Pickens | 543 | 29.16% | 1,319 | 70.84% | -776 | -41.68% | 1,862 |
| Pierce | 523 | 64.73% | 285 | 35.27% | 238 | 29.46% | 808 |
| Pike | 714 | 75.00% | 238 | 25.00% | 476 | 50.00% | 952 |
| Polk | 886 | 37.73% | 1,462 | 62.27% | -576 | -24.53% | 2,348 |
| Pulaski | 639 | 85.89% | 105 | 14.11% | 534 | 71.77% | 744 |
| Putnam | 682 | 92.29% | 57 | 7.71% | 625 | 84.57% | 739 |
| Quitman | 174 | 80.93% | 41 | 19.07% | 133 | 61.86% | 215 |
| Rabun | 590 | 65.85% | 306 | 34.15% | 284 | 31.70% | 896 |
| Randolph | 803 | 81.94% | 177 | 18.06% | 626 | 63.88% | 980 |
| Richmond | 2,086 | 29.01% | 5,104 | 70.99% | -3,018 | -41.97% | 7,190 |
| Rockdale | 472 | 75.16% | 156 | 24.84% | 316 | 50.32% | 628 |
| Schley | 328 | 80.99% | 77 | 19.01% | 251 | 61.98% | 405 |
| Screven | 300 | 29.82% | 706 | 70.18% | -406 | -40.36% | 1,006 |
| Seminole | 371 | 77.13% | 110 | 22.87% | 261 | 54.26% | 481 |
| Spalding | 1,734 | 80.80% | 412 | 19.20% | 1,322 | 61.60% | 2,146 |
| Stephens | 438 | 61.86% | 270 | 38.14% | 168 | 23.73% | 708 |
| Stewart | 732 | 89.27% | 88 | 10.73% | 644 | 78.54% | 820 |
| Sumter | 1,237 | 80.80% | 294 | 19.20% | 943 | 61.59% | 1,531 |
| Talbot | 536 | 87.87% | 74 | 12.13% | 462 | 75.74% | 610 |
| Taliaferro | 446 | 88.49% | 58 | 11.51% | 388 | 76.98% | 504 |
| Tattnall | 460 | 36.77% | 791 | 63.23% | -331 | -26.46% | 1,251 |
| Taylor | 590 | 62.57% | 353 | 37.43% | 237 | 25.13% | 943 |
| Telfair | 2,057 | 86.10% | 332 | 13.90% | 1,725 | 72.21% | 2,389 |
| Terrell | 897 | 88.55% | 116 | 11.45% | 781 | 77.10% | 1,013 |
| Thomas | 1,240 | 60.37% | 814 | 39.63% | 426 | 20.74% | 2,054 |
| Tift | 736 | 59.02% | 511 | 40.98% | 225 | 18.04% | 1,247 |
| Toombs | 615 | 52.74% | 551 | 47.26% | 64 | 5.49% | 1,166 |
| Towns | 517 | 37.63% | 857 | 62.37% | -340 | -24.75% | 1,374 |
| Treutlen | 392 | 85.96% | 64 | 14.04% | 328 | 71.93% | 456 |
| Troup | 1,557 | 61.69% | 967 | 38.31% | 590 | 23.38% | 2,524 |
| Turner | 328 | 38.41% | 526 | 61.59% | -198 | -23.19% | 854 |
| Twiggs | 571 | 88.53% | 74 | 11.47% | 497 | 77.05% | 645 |
| Union | 623 | 17.82% | 2,873 | 82.18% | -2,250 | -64.36% | 3,496 |
| Upson | 721 | 76.54% | 221 | 23.46% | 500 | 53.08% | 942 |
| Walker | 1,053 | 37.09% | 1,786 | 62.91% | -733 | -25.82% | 2,839 |
| Walton | 1,135 | 72.80% | 424 | 27.20% | 711 | 45.61% | 1,559 |
| Ware | 1,416 | 51.40% | 1,339 | 48.60% | 77 | 2.79% | 2,755 |
| Warren | 247 | 49.20% | 255 | 50.80% | -8 | -1.59% | 502 |
| Washington | 1,142 | 70.76% | 472 | 29.24% | 670 | 41.51% | 1,614 |
| Wayne | 488 | 54.16% | 413 | 45.84% | 75 | 8.32% | 901 |
| Webster | 174 | 74.04% | 61 | 25.96% | 113 | 48.09% | 235 |
| Wheeler | 312 | 75.54% | 101 | 24.46% | 211 | 51.09% | 413 |
| White | 274 | 32.54% | 568 | 67.46% | -294 | -34.92% | 842 |
| Whitfield | 1,154 | 41.16% | 1,650 | 58.84% | -496 | -17.69% | 2,804 |
| Wilcox | 459 | 68.00% | 216 | 32.00% | 243 | 36.00% | 675 |
| Wilkes | 747 | 48.35% | 798 | 51.65% | -51 | -3.30% | 1,545 |
| Wilkinson | 487 | 68.21% | 227 | 31.79% | 260 | 36.41% | 714 |
| Worth | 952 | 75.44% | 310 | 24.56% | 642 | 50.87% | 1,262 |
| Totals | 129,602 | 56.56% | 99,368 | 43.36% | 30,234 | 13.19% | 229,158 |
