= National Register of Historic Places listings in Long County, Georgia =

This is a list of properties and districts in Long County, Georgia that are listed on the National Register of Historic Places (NRHP).

This National Park Service list is complete through NPS recent listings posted March 14, 2025.

== Current listings ==
	Name on the Register	Image	Date listed	Location	City or town	Description
1	Long County Courthouse	Long County Courthouse	September 18, 1980 (#80001107)	GA 99; 31°42′28″N 81°44′29″W	Ludowici	
2	Ludowici Well Pavilion	Ludowici Well Pavilion	September 7, 1984 (#84001153)	McQueen St. 31°42′35″N 81°44′43″W	Ludowici	
3	Walthourville Presbyterian Church	Walthourville Presbyterian Church	August 6, 1987 (#87001357)	Allenhurst Antioch Rd. 31°45′00″N 81°36′50″W	near Walthourville	
