= Dustin McGowan =

American baseball player and coach (born 1982)

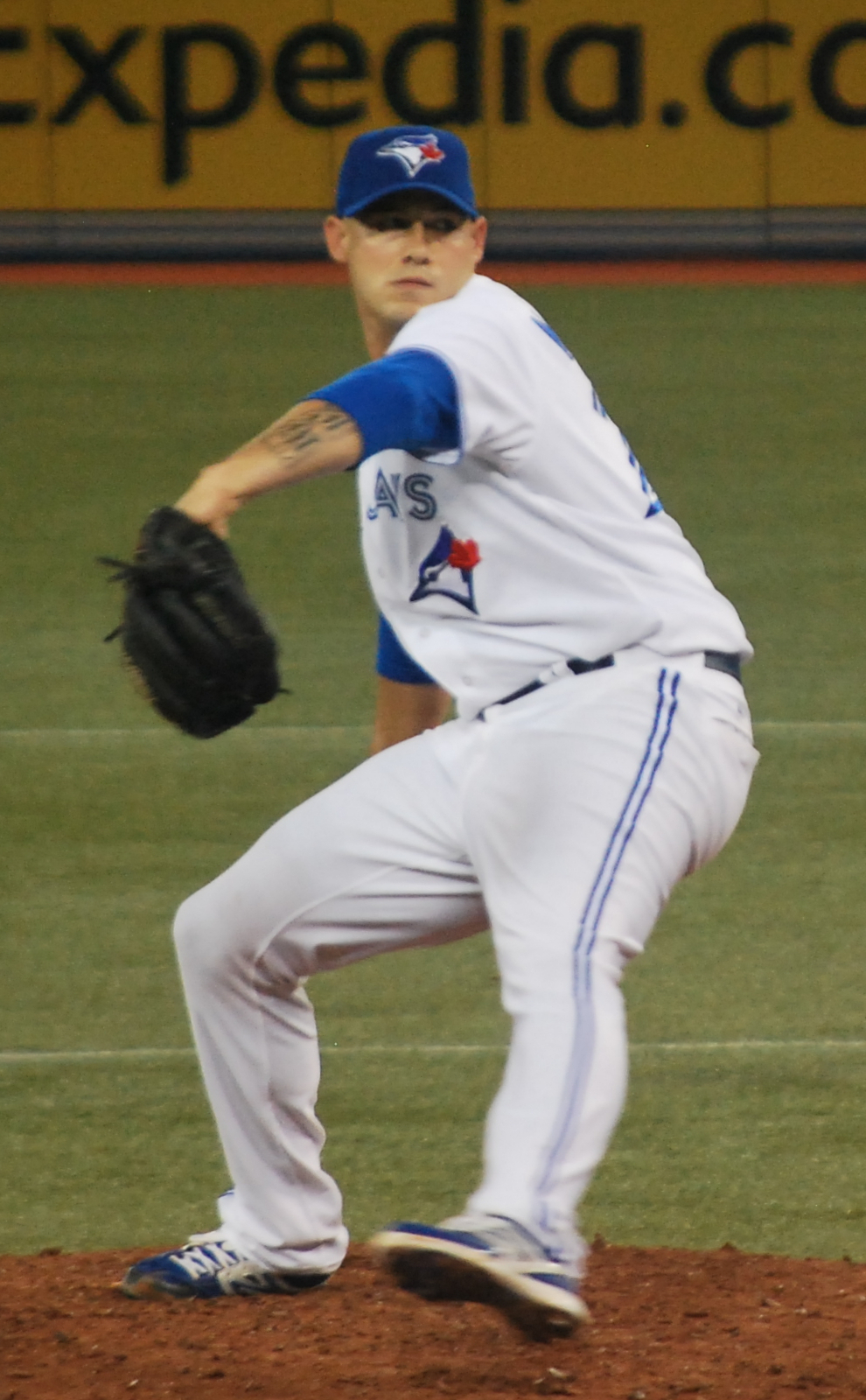
- McGowan with the Toronto Blue Jays in 2013
- Pitcher
- Born: March 24, 1982 (age 44); Savannah, Georgia, U.S.
- Batted: Right Threw: Right

MLB debut
- July 30, 2005, for the Toronto Blue Jays

Last MLB appearance
- October 1, 2017, for the Miami Marlins

Career statistics
- Win–loss record: 35–34
- Earned run average: 4.50
- Strikeouts: 540
- Stats at Baseball Reference

Teams
- Toronto Blue Jays (2005–2008, 2011, 2013–2014); Philadelphia Phillies (2015); Miami Marlins (2016–2017)

Dustin Michael McGowan (born March 24, 1982) is an American former professional baseball pitcher. He played in Major League Baseball (MLB) for the Toronto Blue Jays, Philadelphia Phillies, and Miami Marlins.

== Professional career ==
=== Toronto Blue Jays ===
==== Minor leagues ====
McGowan was drafted by the Toronto Blue Jays out of Long County High School in Ludowici, Georgia in the first round (33rd overall) of the draft on June 4, 2000, and signed with the Blue Jays on June 20, 2000. He began his career with the Medicine Hat Blue Jays where he was 0–3 with a 6.48 ERA in eight starts. In 2002 with the Charleston AlleyCats of the South Atlantic League he was 11–10 with a 4.19 ERA in 28 starts and led the league and the organization with 163 strikeouts. On May 21, 2003, he pitched a complete-game shutout for the Dunedin Blue Jays of the Florida State League. His 2004 season was cut short when he underwent Tommy John surgery on his elbow on May 13.

==== 2005–2007 ====
On July 30, 2005, McGowan was called-up and made his debut that same day against the Texas Rangers. He received a no decision, having pitched five innings and allowing one run, and struck out six batters, the most by a Toronto starter in a Major League debut at the time.

McGowan bounced between the bullpen and the starting rotation during his first two seasons with the Blue Jays. He struggled in his rookie season following his impressive Major League debut, posting a 6.35 ERA in 13 games, including seven starts. At the beginning of the 2006 season, he was recalled from the Syracuse SkyChiefs to take the place of the struggling reliever Jason Frasor. In his second stint with the team McGowan struggled once again and was optioned back to Triple-A Syracuse on May 11 to work as a starter.

In 2005, Baseball America named him the #1 prospect in the Blue Jays' farm system and he was considered one of the cornerstones of the Blue Jays' future. However, his slow development, and in particular his lack of control, stirred up trade rumors during the 2006 off-season, while he had previously been off-limits to potential trades.

McGowan would have been eligible to be claimed off waivers had he not made the 2007 Blue Jays 25-man roster out of Spring training, but the Blue Jays were granted another minor-league option year for him. This enabled the team to send McGowan back to the minors, if necessary, without exposing to waivers during the 2007 season.

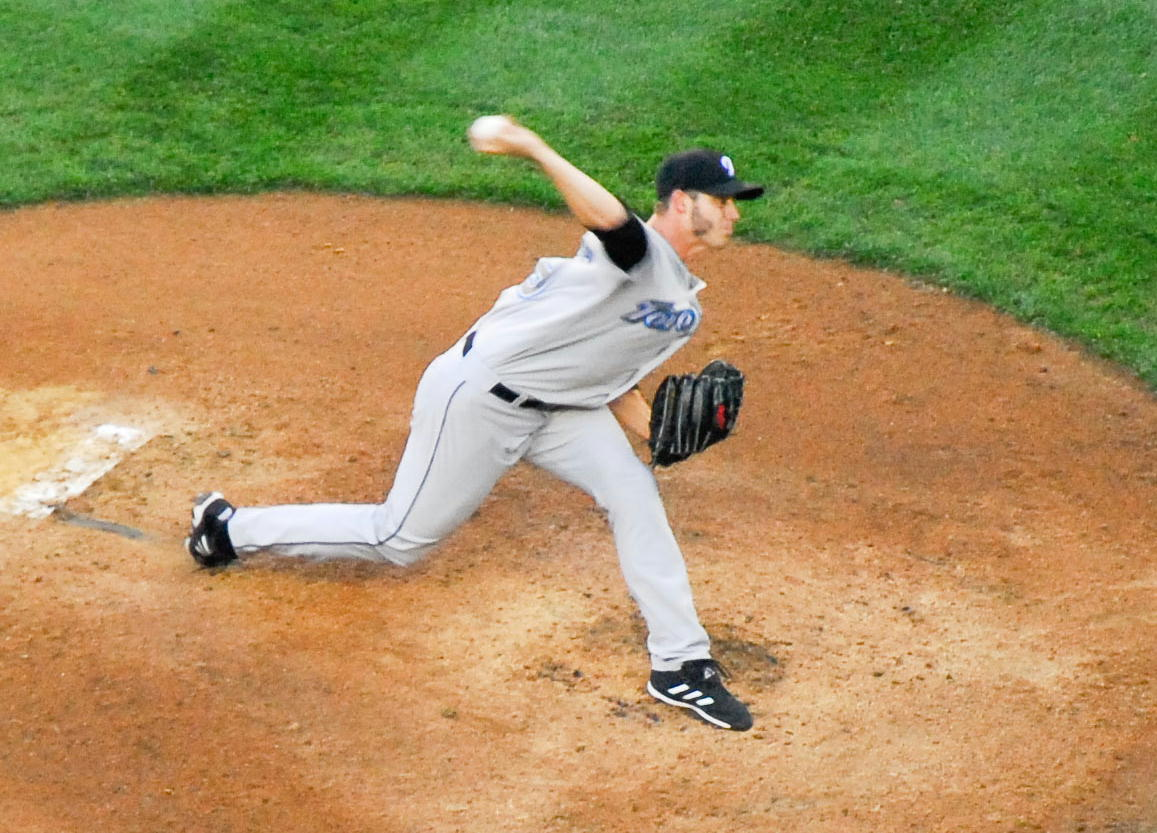
McGowan pitching in 2007

McGowan started the 2007 season impressively for the Syracuse Chiefs. Despite an 0–2 record at the end of April, he had a 1.64 ERA and 29 strikeouts in 22 innings. This led to a call-up to the Blue Jays rotation in early May after an injury to Gustavo Chacín. On June 19, 2007, he gave up six runs on eight hits over one and two-thirds innings in a 10–1 Jays defeat, and took the loss. He would redeem himself in his next start on June 24, 2007, as he had a no-hitter in the first eight innings against the Colorado Rockies at Rogers Centre, allowing only an 0–1 single to the first batter he faced in the ninth, designated hitter Jeff Baker, making him just the fifth pitcher in franchise history to carry a no-hitter into the ninth inning. He went on to record a shutout, the first of his career as well as his first complete game.

"That was fun to watch. All along, ever since they drafted this kid, they've been expecting stuff like this from him, and he's certainly capable. Today was one of the better games I've seen him throw. He had everything going." said catcher Gregg Zaun, who caught McGowan's complete-game shutout.

On September 7, 2007, McGowan recorded a career high 12 strikeouts against the Tampa Bay Devil Rays, while giving up just two runs in eight innings of work.

McGowan finished the 2007 season with a 12–10 record and a 4.08 ERA. Of his 27 games, 18 of them were quality starts, and he ranked second on the team with 169 2/3 innings pitched and 144 strikeouts to solidify his place as the number three starter in Toronto's rotation behind ace Roy Halladay and A. J. Burnett, where he began the 2008 campaign.

Because of diabetes, McGowan started wearing prescription lenses to improve his vision in low-light conditions.

==== 2008–2012 ====
McGowan had compiled a 6–7 record with an ERA of 4.37 and 85 strikeouts prior to the 2008 All-Star break. But on July 8, he was forced to leave the game early with pain in his shoulder. On July 10, he was put on the 15-day disabled list. Then on July 26, it was announced that McGowan would undergo season-ending surgery to repair fraying of the labrum in his shoulder. He was expected to return during the 2009 season, but his recovery was slower than initially anticipated. McGowan began throwing from level ground in early May 2009. However, further injury befell him and on July 9, 2009, McGowan had knee surgery to repair articular cartilage damage, requiring six weeks of recovery before continuing his rehabilitation programme.

McGowan was expected to pitch sometime in June 2010, but he experienced shoulder pain during early June and it was found that he had a torn rotator cuff and had season ending surgery, he was expected to have to wait 4–6 months before he could resume throwing. It was hoped that McGowan would recover and be ready for the 2011 season. Of the second surgery GM Alex Anthopoulos said that "We're optimistic that he'll be able to come back and we'll continue to work with him once he starts throwing."

On August 2, 2011, manager John Farrell said he expected to add McGowan to the Jays rotation sometime in September. He was expected to join the Double-A New Hampshire Fisher Cats after one more start with the Advanced-A Dunedin Blue Jays.

On September 5, 2011, McGowan was activated from the 60-day disabled list. The following day, McGowan made his first appearance in over three years, against the Boston Red Sox. McGowan pitched four innings, and gave up three earned runs while striking out five and walking three.

On March 26, 2012, McGowan signed a two-year contract extension for $3 million with a club option for 2015 worth $4 million. On August 7, 2012, it was announced that McGowan would undergo arthroscopic shoulder surgery on August 9, to evaluate the recovery of his right shoulder.

==== 2013–2014 ====
McGowan started the 2013 season on the 15-day disabled list. On April 7, the Blue Jays moved him to the 60-day disabled list to make room for Édgar González. McGowan took part in a weighted ball training program to increase his velocity and shoulder strength during his recovery. McGowan started a rehab assignment with the Dunedin Blue Jays on May 14. After two appearances with Dunedin (2.0 IP, 1 H, 4 SO, 0 R), his rehab assignment was transferred to the Triple-A Buffalo Bisons effective May 18.

McGowan was called up from Buffalo on June 8, 2013. Todd Redmond was optioned to make room on the 25-man roster for McGowan. McGowan made his 2013 debut in the 10th inning against the Texas Rangers on June 8, pitching 1/3 of an inning with one strikeout and one walk. The Jays would go on to win the game 4–3 in 18 innings, the longest in franchise history. He was placed on the 15-day disabled list on August 1, 2013, with a right oblique strain. Sergio Santos was activated from the 60-day disabled list to replace McGowan. McGowan was activated from the disabled list on September 1 when the rosters expanded, and announced his intention to compete for a job in the starting rotation in 2014.

McGowan was named as the Blue Jays' fifth starter on March 26, 2014. In a game against the Baltimore Orioles on April 11, 2014, McGowan earned his first win at any level, majors or minors, since June 22, 2008—a span of nearly six years. In the win, McGowan pitched 6 1/3 scoreless innings with two strikeouts in a 2–0 victory. After being moved back to the bullpen in May, McGowan earned his first MLB save on June 13, 2014, in a 4–0 win over the Orioles. He would post a 5–3 record in 2014, with an ERA of 4.17 and 61 strikeouts in 82 innings pitched. On November 1, the Blue Jays declined McGowan's $4 million 2015 option, making him a free agent.

=== Los Angeles Dodgers ===
On February 23, 2015, McGowan signed a one-year contract with the Los Angeles Dodgers. He was released on March 31.

=== Philadelphia Phillies ===
On April 4, 2015, McGowan signed a one-year contract with the Philadelphia Phillies. He was outrighted to Triple-A on May 15. He was called back up on June 5 and designated for assignment on June 18. On August 3 with the Lehigh Valley IronPigs, McGowan allowed Mike Hessman's record-setting 433rd career Minor League home run.

=== Miami Marlins ===
On December 12, 2015, McGowan signed a minor league contract with the Miami Marlins. He was designated for assignment by the Marlins on April 17, 2016. He was called back up on May 11. McGowan finished the 2016 season with a 1–3 record, 2.82 ERA, and 63 strikeouts in 67 total innings. McGowan won the Hutch Award for the 2016 season.

McGowan agreed to a one-year contract with the Marlins for the 2017 season. The contract became official on December 12. He became a free agent following the season.

=== Tampa Bay Rays ===
On February 9, 2018, McGowan signed a minor league contract with the Tampa Bay Rays that included an invitation to spring training. He was released by the Rays on March 7.

=== Second stint with Miami Marlins ===
On April 6, 2018, McGowan signed a minor league contract with the Miami Marlins. He was released on May 17, 2018.

== Coaching career ==
McGowan never formally announced his retirement. In June 2020, McGowan was hired by St. John Paul II Catholic High School in Tallahassee to coach their baseball team.

== Personal life ==
McGowan lives outside Tallahassee with his wife, Jilly and their two children.
