= Ludowici Well Pavilion =

Historic structure in the US

- U.S. National Register of Historic Places
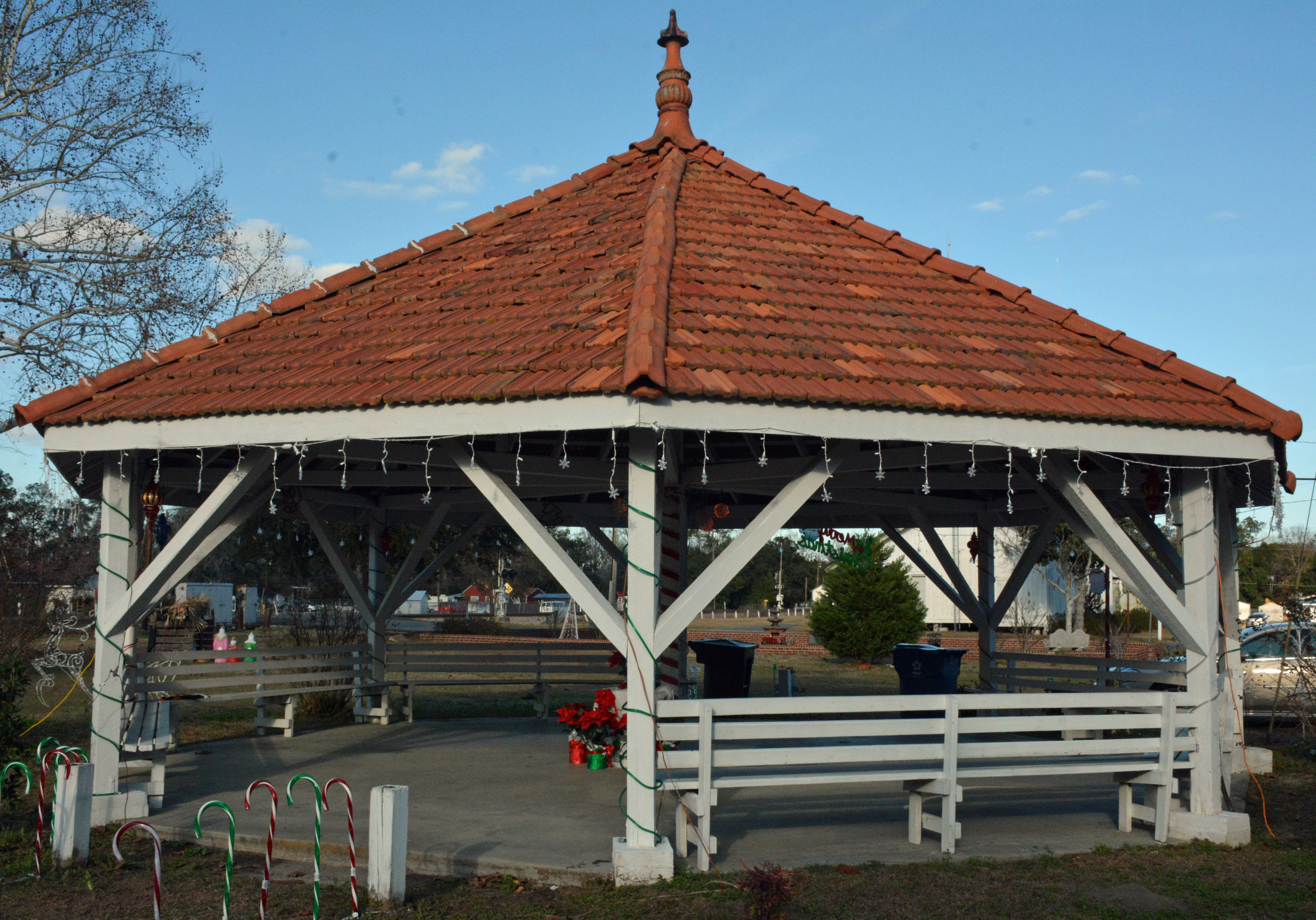

- Location within Georgia
- Location: McQueen St., Ludowici, Georgia
- Coordinates: 31.70975°N 81.74541°W
- Area: less than one acre
- Built: 1907
- NRHP reference No.: 84001153
- Added to NRHP: September 7, 1984

The Ludowici Well Pavilion is a historic site in Ludowici, Georgia, located in an open public area in the center of town on McQueen Street. The well was constructed in 1907 and supplied drinking water. It is shaped like an octagon and has wooden benches inside, which were originally located outside of the structure.

The shelter's roof is tiled with interlocking clay roof tiles that were manufactured by the Ludowici-Celadon Company when it operated a factory in the city. The Ludowici company first began constructing its plant in the region in 1902, drawn by the warm climate, plentiful clay, and cheap labor. After the company helped fund the construction of a local high school, the city was incorporated as Ludowici in its honor. Even after the company's local factory closed in 1914, its clay roof tiles covered many buildings throughout the city and county.

The pavilion was constructed after the Neill McQueen family donated a lot of land in the center of the city for the sinking of an artesian well to supply residents with clean water. They stipulated that the city build a shelter over the well, and that the well remain open and free to the public. In the following decades the pavilion became the site of events such as political meetings, community socials, and farmers' markets.

The well flowed freely until the 1920s, when a hand-pump had to be installed to compensate for the lack of water pressure. During renovations in 1958 and 1983, surrounding pine trees were removed, as well as a paneled ceiling and brick floor. A steel post was added to the center for support. The structure was added to the National Register of Historic Places on September 7, 1984. When the roof's original clay finial was lost, it was replaced using a painted ringer taken from a washing machine.

== See also ==
- National Register of Historic Places listings in Long County, Georgia
