= Donald, Georgia =

- Unincorporated community
- Location within Georgia Location within the United States
- Coordinates: 31°49′18″N 81°51′0″W
- Country: United States
- State: Georgia
- County: Long
- Elevation: 79 ft (24 m)
- Time zone: UTC-5 (Eastern (EST))
  - Summer (DST): UTC-4 (EDT)
- GNIS feature ID: 313537

Donald is an unincorporated community in northwestern Long County, Georgia, United States. It lies a short distance away from the concurrent U.S. Routes 25 and 301, to the northwest of the city of Ludowici, the county seat of Long County. Its elevation is 79 feet (24 m).
