= Chidi Okeke =

American football player (born 1996)

Profile
- Position: Offensive tackle

Personal information
- Born: December 26, 1996 (age 29); Anambra, Nigeria
- Listed height: 6 ft 6 in (1.98 m)
- Listed weight: 315 lb (143 kg)

Career information
- High school: Faith Baptist Christian Academy (Ludowici, Georgia, U.S.)
- College: LSU (2015–2016); Tennessee State (2017–2018)
- NFL draft: 2019: undrafted

Career history
- Washington Redskins (2019)*; Kansas City Chiefs (2019)*; Miami Dolphins (2019–2020)*; Saskatchewan Roughriders (2021)*; Tampa Bay Buccaneers (2021)*; Pittsburgh Maulers (2022); San Antonio Brahmas (2023); DC Defenders (2024)*; Winnipeg Blue Bombers (2024); Michigan Panthers (2025)*
- * Offseason or practice squad member only

Awards and highlights
- Phil Steele All-OVC First Team (2018); All-Ohio Valley Conference First Team (2018)

Career XFL statistics as of 2023
- Games played: 10
- Games started: 6
- Stats at Pro Football Reference

Chidi Okeke (born December 26, 1996) is a Nigerian professional football offensive tackle. He played college football at LSU before transferring to Tennessee State. Okeke has also spent time with the Washington Redskins, Miami Dolphins, Kansas City Chiefs, and Tampa Bay Buccaneers of the National Football League (NFL); Saskatchewan Roughriders and Winnipeg Blue Bombers of the Canadian Football League (CFL); Pittsburgh Maulers of the United States Football League (USFL); and San Antonio Brahmas of the XFL.

== Early life ==
Okeke played for Faith Baptist Christian Academy where he was a five-star recruit and was ranked as the second-best offensive tackle in the nation, as well as the 22nd best player nationally, according to 247Sports. He played in the U.S Army All-American Bowl.

Okeke committed to play for the LSU Tigers over offers from Auburn and Alabama.

== College career ==
=== LSU ===
In 2015, Okeke redshirted his freshman year and did not play. The following year, he played in 11 games for LSU. He announced that he would be transferring in December 2016.

=== Tennessee State ===
Okeke transferred to Tennessee State in 2017 and appeared in 11 games, 10 as a starter. He started all nine games in 2018, mainly as a left tackle.

== Professional career ==
=== Washington Redskins ===
After going unselected in the 2019 NFL draft, Okeke signed with the Washington Redskins on April 27, 2019. He was released on May 23, 2019.

=== Kansas City Chiefs ===
On May 29, 2019, the Kansas City Chiefs signed Okeke. He was released on August 31.

=== Miami Dolphins ===
On September 10, 2019, Okeke was signed to the practice squad of the Miami Dolphins. He signed a future contract after the season, but was released on March 18, 2020.

=== Saskatchewan Roughriders ===
Okeke was signed by the Saskatchewan Roughriders of the Canadian Football League (CFL) on February 17, 2021. He was released on April 27.

=== Tampa Bay Buccaneers ===
On July 29, 2021, Okeke returned to the NFL and signed with the Tampa Bay Buccaneers. He was waived with an injury designation on August 24 and reverted to injured reserve the next day. He was released on August 30.

=== Pittsburgh Maulers ===
On February 22, 2022, the Pittsburgh Maulers selected Okeke in the fifth round of the 2022 USFL draft. He was the first offensive tackle selected in the offensive tackle phase of the draft. He appeared in and started all 10 games for the Maulers.

=== San Antonio Brahmas ===
On January 1, 2023, the San Antonio Brahmas selected Okeke with the second overall pick in the 2023 XFL Supplemental Draft. He appeared in all 10 games, six as a starter.

=== DC Defenders ===
On January 15, 2024, Okeke was selected by the DC Defenders in the fourth round of the Super Draft portion of the 2024 UFL dispersal draft. He signed with the team on January 24. Okeke was released on March 10.

=== Winnipeg Blue Bombers ===
On May 6, 2024, Okeke signed with the Winnipeg Blue Bombers of the Canadian Football League (CFL).

=== Michigan Panthers ===
On March 12, 2025, Okeke signed with the Michigan Panthers of the United Football League (UFL). He was released on March 20.

== Personal life ==
In 2013, Okeke moved to the United States from Nigeria where he played soccer and basketball.
