= Tariq Carpenter =

American football player (born 1998)

Profile
- Position: Linebacker

Personal information
- Born: December 28, 1998 (age 27); Ludowici, Georgia, U.S.
- Listed height: 6 ft 3 in (1.91 m)
- Listed weight: 230 lb (104 kg)

Career information
- High school: Long County (Ludowici)
- College: Georgia Tech (2017–2021)
- NFL draft: 2022: 7th round, 228th overall pick

Career history
- Green Bay Packers (2022); Pittsburgh Steelers (2023); San Antonio Brahmas (2025); St. Louis Battlehawks (2026)

Career NFL statistics
- Total tackles: 10
- Stats at Pro Football Reference

Tariq Marquese Carpenter (born December 28, 1998) is an American professional football linebacker for the St. Louis Battlehawks of the United Football League (UFL). He played college football at Georgia Tech and previously played in the National Football League (NFL) for the Green Bay Packers and Pittsburgh Steelers.

== Professional career ==
Pre-draft measurables
Height	Weight	Arm length	Hand span	40-yard dash	10-yard split	20-yard split	20-yard shuttle	Three-cone drill	Vertical jump	Broad jump
6 ft 2 1/4 in (1.89 m)	225 lb (102 kg)	33 3/8 in (0.85 m)	9 1/8 in (0.23 m)	4.52 s	1.55 s	2.60 s	4.46 s	7.50 s	39.0 in (0.99 m)	11 ft 4 in (3.45 m)
All values from Pro Day

=== Green Bay Packers ===
Carpenter was drafted by the Green Bay Packers in the seventh round (228th overall) of the 2022 NFL draft. On May 6, 2022, he signed his rookie contract. He was released on August 30, 2023.

=== Pittsburgh Steelers ===
On September 2, 2023, Carpenter was signed to the practice squad of the Pittsburgh Steelers. He appeared in three games for the Steelers, logging one solo tackle and one assisted tackle. On December 17, Carpenter was released by Pittsburgh following his arrest the same day.

=== San Antonio Brahmas ===
Carpenter signed with the San Antonio Brahmas of the UFL on September 26, 2024. He was released on April 29, 2025.

=== St. Louis Battlehawks ===
On January 14, 2026, Carpenter was selected by the St. Louis Battlehawks of the United Football League (UFL). He was released on April 22.

== NFL career statistics ==
=== Regular season ===
Year	Team	Games		Tackles				Interceptions						Fumbles	
Year	Team	GP	GS	Comb	Total	Ast	Sck	PD	Int	Yds	Avg	Lng	TDs	FF	FR
2022	GB	14	0	8	6	2	0.0	0	0	0	0	0	0	0	0
2023	PIT	3	0	2	1	1	0.0	0	0	0	0	0	0	0	0
Career		17	0	10	7	3	0.0	0	0	0	0	0	0	0	0
Source: pro-football-referencecom

== Legal issues ==
On December 17, 2023, Carpenter was arrested in Pittsburgh after allegedly throwing a woman to the ground and holding her against her will, and charged with simple assault. The league gave him a six-game suspension in October 2024.
