= Beards Creek, Georgia =

Unincorporated community in Georgia, U.S.

Coordinates: 31°51′59″N 81°53′07″W

Beards Creek is an unincorporated community in Long County, in the U.S. state of Georgia.

== History ==
A post office called Beard's Creek was established in 1853, and remained in operation until 1915. The community takes its name from nearby Beards Creek.
