= Long County School District =

School district in Georgia, United States

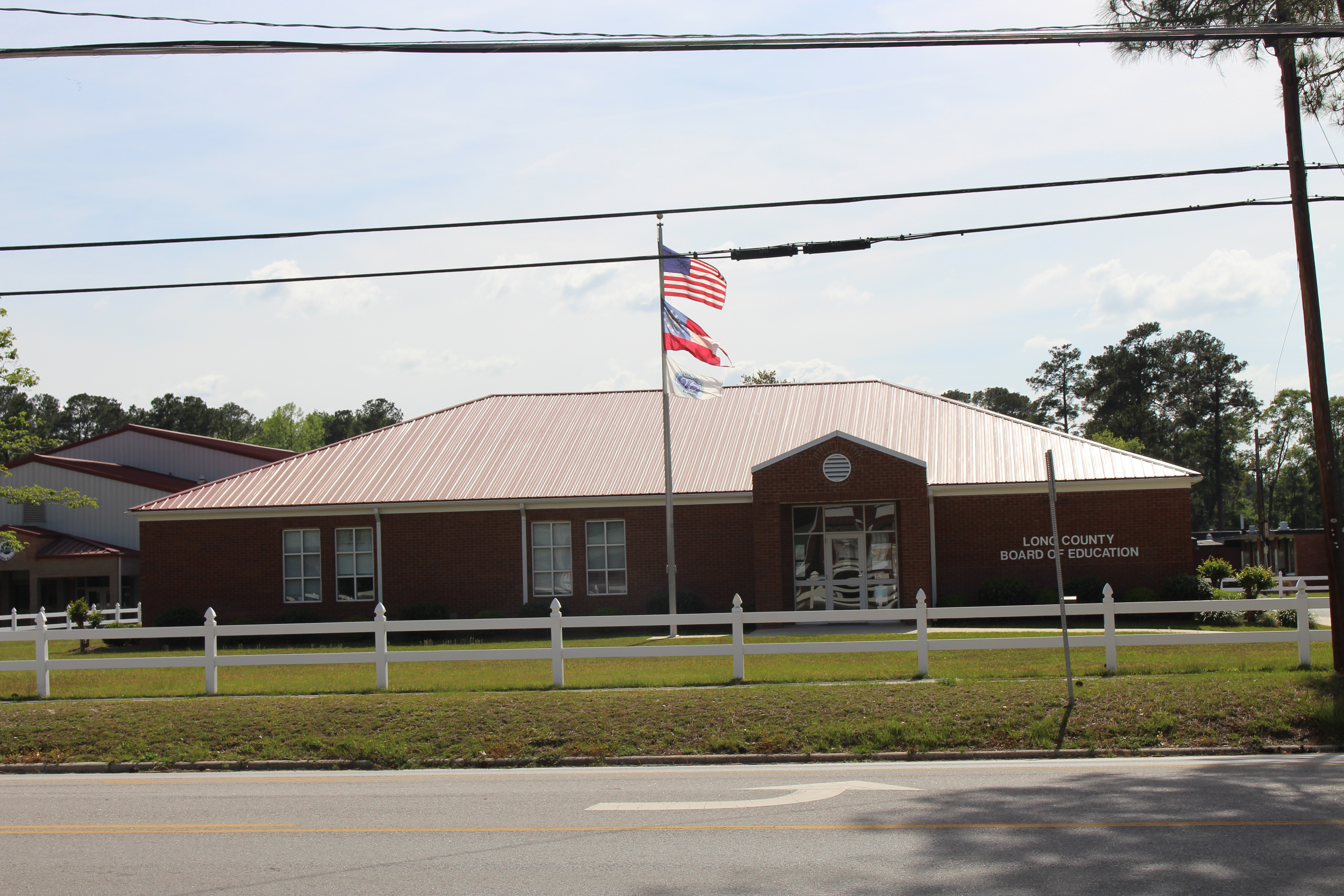
- Long County Board of Education building

Address
- 468 South McDonald Street Ludowici, Georgia, 31316; United States

District information
- Type: Public
- Grades: PreK–12
- NCES District ID: 1303360

Students and staff
- Students: 3,887
- Teachers: 230.3 (FTE)
- Staff: 258.3
- Student–teacher ratio: 16.88

Other information
- Website: www.longcountyps.com

The Long County School District is a public school district in Long County, Georgia, United States, based in Ludowici. It serves the communities of Donald and Ludowici.

It is the designated school district for residents for grades Pre-K - 12, except parts in Fort Stewart. Fort Stewart has the Department of Defense Education Activity (DoDEA) as its local school district, for the elementary level. Students at the secondary level on Fort Stewart attend public schools operated by county school districts.

== Schools ==
The Long County School District has four elementary schools, one middle school, and one high school which is currently in Region 2-AAA.

=== Elementary schools ===
- Walker Pre-K serves the grade of Pre-K
- Long County Primary School serves grades Kindergarten - 1
- Smiley Elementary School serves grades 2 - 3.
- McClelland Elementary School serves grades 4 - 5.

=== Middle school ===
- Long County Middle School serves grades 6 - 8.

=== High school ===
- Long County High School
