= Jamin Davis =

American football player (born 1998)

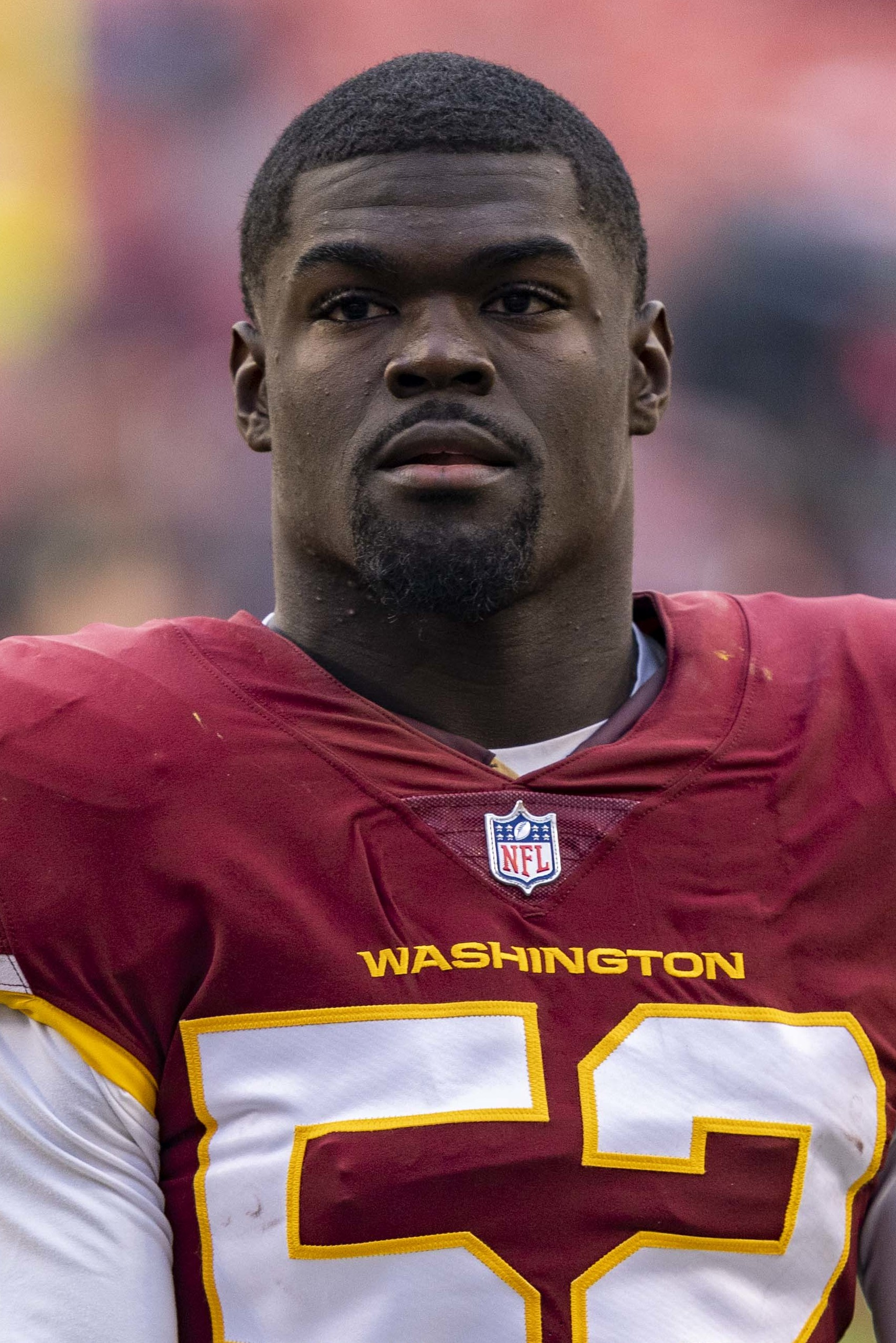
- Davis with the Washington Football Team in 2021

Profile
- Position: Outside linebacker

Personal information
- Born: December 12, 1998 (age 27); Honolulu, Hawaii, U.S.
- Listed height: 6 ft 4 in (1.93 m)
- Listed weight: 234 lb (106 kg)

Career information
- High school: Long County (Ludowici, Georgia)
- College: Kentucky (2017–2020)
- NFL draft: 2021: 1st round, 19th overall pick

Career history
- Washington Football Team / Commanders (2021–2024); Green Bay Packers (2024)*; Minnesota Vikings (2024); New York Jets (2024); Las Vegas Raiders (2025); Pittsburgh Steelers (2026)*
- * Offseason or practice squad member only

Career NFL statistics as of 2025
- Tackles: 290
- Sacks: 8
- Forced fumbles: 2
- Fumble recoveries: 2
- Pass deflections: 6
- Interceptions: 1
- Stats at Pro Football Reference

Jamin Davis (/dʒeɪmɪn/ JAY-men; born December 12, 1998) is an American professional football outside linebacker. Davis played college football for the Kentucky Wildcats and was drafted by the Washington Football Team in the first round of the 2021 NFL draft. He has also played for the Green Bay Packers, Minnesota Vikings, New York Jets, and Las Vegas Raiders.

== Early life ==
The son of U.S. Army parents, Davis was born on a military base in Honolulu on December 12, 1998. His family moved to Hinesville, Georgia, when he was a year old, with Davis later attending Long County High School in Ludowici, Georgia. Playing linebacker and wide receiver for their football team, Davis compiled 131 tackles as a junior and 126 more as a senior while also catching three touchdowns.

== College career ==
A three-star prospect, Davis committed to play college football for the Kentucky Wildcats. He redshirted as a freshman in 2017 and played mostly on special teams in 2018, also recording an interception as a reserve player. He followed with 32 tackles in 2019 before being named as a starter for the 2020 season, where he led the team in tackles with 102 and also recorded 1.5 sacks, a forced fumble, a fumble recovery, and three interceptions, one of which he returned 85 yards for a touchdown.

=== Statistics ===
Season	Games	Tackles	Solo	Ast	TFL	Sacks	Int	FF	FR	TD
2017	Redshirted									
2018	7	10	6	4	0	0	1	0	0	0
2019	8	32	12	20	1	1	1	0	0	0
2020	10	102	48	54	4	1.5	3	1	0	1
Career	25	144	66	78	5	2.5	5	1	0	1

== Professional career ==
Pre-draft measurables
Height	Weight	Arm length	Hand span	Wingspan	40-yard dash	10-yard split	20-yard split	Vertical jump	Broad jump	Bench press
6 ft 3 1/2 in (1.92 m)	234 lb (106 kg)	33 in (0.84 m)	9 1/2 in (0.24 m)	6 ft 7 7/8 in (2.03 m)	4.47 s	1.53 s	2.61 s	42.0 in (1.07 m)	11 ft 0 in (3.35 m)	21 reps
All values from Kentucky's Pro Day

=== Washington Football Team / Commanders ===
Davis was selected by the Washington Football Team in the first round (19th overall) of the 2021 NFL draft. He signed his four-year rookie contract on May 13, 2021. Davis took over as the starting middle linebacker over Cole Holcomb, who suffered an injury, in the Week 10 game against the Philadelphia Eagles. In it, he recovered a fumble that put the Commanders in position to kick a field goal in a victory over the Eagles. He was placed on injured reserve on January 7, 2023, finishing the season with a team-leading 104 tackles, two fumble recoveries, and three sacks.

On April 25, 2024, the Commanders declined the fifth-year option on Davis' contract. He moved to defensive end in the offseason. Davis was released on October 22. He appeared in five of seven games and recorded 12 tackles.

=== Green Bay Packers ===
On October 29, 2024, Davis was signed to the Green Bay Packers' practice squad.

=== Minnesota Vikings ===
Davis signed with the Minnesota Vikings on November 26, 2024, after an injury to Ivan Pace Jr. He was released by the Vikings on December 28.

=== New York Jets ===
On December 31, 2024, Davis was claimed off waivers by the New York Jets. On March 19, 2025, Davis re-signed with the Jets on a one-year contract. He was released on August 24.

=== Las Vegas Raiders ===
On October 8, 2025, Davis signed with the Las Vegas Raiders' practice squad. He was promoted to the active roster on November 11. Davis was released on December 2, and re-signed to the practice squad. He signed a reserve/future contract with Las Vegas on January 5, 2026.

On April 30, Davis was released by the Raiders.

=== Pittsburgh Steelers ===
On June 4, 2026, Davis signed a one-year contract with the Pittsburgh Steelers. He was released by the Steelers on August 29.

== NFL career statistics ==
Legend
**Bold**	Career high

=== Regular season ===
Year	Team	Games		Tackles					Interceptions						Fumbles				
Year	Team	GP	GS	Cmb	Solo	Ast	Sck	TFL	Int	Yds	Avg	Lng	TD	PD	FF	Fum	FR	Yds	TD
2021	WAS	**16**	8	76	48	28	1.0	3	0	0	0.0	0	0	1	0	0	0	0	0
2022	WAS	**16**	**15**	**104**	**68**	36	**3.0**	**9**	0	0	0.0	0	0	1	0	0	**2**	0	0
2023	WAS	13	13	89	50	**39**	**3.0**	8	**1**	0	0.0	0	0	**4**	**2**	0	0	0	0
2024	WAS	5	0	13	8	5	0.0	1	0	0	0.0	0	0	0	0	0	0	0	0
2024	MIN	4	0	5	4	1	1.0	1	0	0	0.0	0	0	0	0	0	0	0	0
2025	LV	2	1	3	1	2	0.0	0	0	0	0.0	0	0	0	0	0	0	0	0
Career		56	37	290	179	111	8.0	22	1	0	0.0	0	0	6	2	0	2	0	0

== Personal life ==
Davis' childhood nickname was "Shadow", named after Shadow from the Sonic the Hedgehog video game franchise. He received the nickname from a close friend and partner in track sprinting nicknamed Sonic, as the two characters are rivals in the franchise. Davis majored in community and leadership development at Kentucky and wore 44 as his Wildcats uniform number to honor his grandmother who died at age 44. He was interning at an attorney's office in Lexington, Kentucky, prior to the start of the COVID-19 pandemic in 2020. Davis is a fan of NASCAR, with his favorite driver being Jimmie Johnson.

=== Legal issues ===
On December 19, 2021, Davis was charged with reckless driving for driving 89 mph despite a 65 mph speed limit, for which he ultimately paid a $150 fine. On March 28, 2022, Davis was arrested and again charged with reckless driving for driving 114 mph on the Loudoun County Parkway, exceeding the speed limit of 45 mph. On August 1, 2023, Loudoun County district court issued him a guilty verdict, resulting in Davis receiving a 30-day jail sentence, a fine, and a suspension of his driver's license. Davis' case was up for review two days later, but the review was given a continuance to August 31. Davis' appeal was originally set for a jury trial scheduled for March 4, 2024, but his appeal was settled three days earlier. On March 1, 2024, in exchange for Davis pleading guilty to reckless driving, he was sentenced to a six-month suspension of his driver's license, a $2,500 fine along with additional court costs, and mandatory community service and avoided a jail sentence.
