= 1964 United States presidential election in Georgia =

- November 3, 1964

| Nominee | Barry Goldwater | Lyndon B. Johnson |
| Party | Republican | Democratic |
| Home state | Arizona | Texas |
| Running mate | William E. Miller | Hubert Humphrey |
| Electoral vote | 12 | 0 |
| Popular vote | 616,584 | 522,557 |
| Percentage | 54.12% | 45.87% |
County results
Goldwater
50–60%
60–70%
70–80%
80–90%
Johnson
50–60%
60–70%
70–80%
80–90%
President before election
Lyndon B. Johnson
Democratic
Elected President
Lyndon B. Johnson
Democratic

The 1964 United States presidential election in Georgia took place on November 3, 1964, as part of the 1964 United States presidential election, which was held on that day throughout all 50 states and The District of Columbia. Voters chose 12 representatives, or electors to the Electoral College, who voted for president and vice president.

Republican nominee and U.S. Senator from Arizona Barry Goldwater carried the state by 8.3 percentage points over incumbent Democratic president Lyndon B. Johnson. With his victory, Goldwater became the first Republican to ever carry the state in a presidential election. This was an impressive feat, especially given that Goldwater lost to Lyndon B. Johnson nationally in a landslide. Georgia joined the other Deep South states of Mississippi, Alabama, South Carolina and Louisiana in supporting the Arizona senator as a protest against the Civil Rights Act, although it did so by a smaller margin – 8.25% – than any other Deep South state Goldwater carried.

This election was the first time since 1836 that a Democrat would win the presidency without carrying Georgia. Georgia was also one of three states that voted with a certain party for the first time in this election, the other two being Alaska and Vermont, both of which voted for a Democratic presidential candidate for the first time. Georgia was one of five states that swung more Republican in 1964, alongside Louisiana, Mississippi, Alabama, and South Carolina.

Pro-Union and almost entirely white Appalachia, which previously supported Republican candidates, gave Towns County to the Democrats for the first time since 1952, and nearly switched Gilmer and Pickens Counties.

== Campaign ==
James H. Gray Sr., the chair of the Georgia Democratic Party, supported Goldwater. Calvin F. Craig, the head of the Ku Klux Klan in Georgia, supported Goldwater as he saw the election as a battle between Goldwater's "Americanism" and Johnson's "socialism". A "Democrats for Goldwater" group was also organized by the "Citizens' Council".

The majority of opinion polls between July and early October suggested that, despite this widespread opposition to Johnson's programs, Goldwater would not win Georgia. In fact, in early August, Georgia was viewed as alongside Arkansas and North Carolina as the most secure southern state for Johnson. Nevertheless, those Democratic Party delegates who refused to support Goldwater because of his policies on rural electrification and subsidies to tobacco farmers were concerned that Goldwater could carry Georgia – and the entire South – as early as late August.

Moreover, in Valdosta in the far south, the region where resistance to black civil rights was most extreme, white union workers in September had been polled as supporting Goldwater 315 to 19, with 1 vote for George Wallace who would carry the state in 1968. By the end of September, it was clear that the state was bitterly divided, with the previously rock-solid Democratic south rooting for Goldwater but defections from Republican support during the previous election in the northern counties appearing to be almost as widespread, because there was some hope Johnson could reverse large population declines and win support through his War on Poverty program. By the end of October, amidst much campaigning in the state by both Johnson and Goldwater, it was generally thought Georgia was leaning towards the Republicans.

Compared to the previous election, Georgia swung to the Republicans by over 34%, though this masked enormous regional differences. Among the rural areas of the "black belt" and the south of the state, there were enormous swings to Goldwater as the whites – the only people who voted – totally deserted Johnson. For instance, Miller County went from 94% for Kennedy to only 14% for Johnson, and Lee County from 69% for Kennedy to only 19 percent for Johnson.

In contrast, only 55% of those Georgian voters who supported Nixon in 1960 remained with Goldwater. Deserting of the Republicans in pro-Union and almost entirely white Appalachia gave Towns County to the Democrats for the first time since 1952, and nearly switched Gilmer and Pickens Counties. Illustrating the "bifurcated" political change in the state was that while FDR carried the state by 83.83 percentage points in 1932, Herbert Hoover had won Towns County by 48 votes. One of the best examples of anti-Catholic voters going to Democrats was Long County, which had only given Kennedy 23 percent of the vote in 1960, but gave Johnson 84% in 1964. Goldwater received 65% of the white vote.

During the concurrent House elections of 1964 in Georgia, Republicans picked up a seat from the Democrats, that being the Third District House seat won by Howard Callaway who became the first Republican to be elected to the House of Representatives from Georgia since Reconstruction.

== Results ==
General election results
| Party | Pledged to | Elector | Votes |
|---|---|---|---|
| Republican Party | Barry Goldwater | Moye | 616,600 |
| Republican Party | Barry Goldwater | Dougherty | 616,584 |
| Republican Party | Barry Goldwater | Kaliher | 616,425 |
| Republican Party | Barry Goldwater | Howard | 616,380 |
| Republican Party | Barry Goldwater | Scholoth | 616,330 |
| Republican Party | Barry Goldwater | Kent | 616,292 |
| Republican Party | Barry Goldwater | Pickett | 616,289 |
| Republican Party | Barry Goldwater | Levison | 616,284 |
| Republican Party | Barry Goldwater | Wasden | 616,244 |
| Republican Party | Barry Goldwater | Hartness | 616,197 |
| Republican Party | Barry Goldwater | Stokes | 616,017 |
| Republican Party | Barry Goldwater | Smith | 615,851 |
| Democratic Party | Lyndon B. Johnson (incumbent) | Sanders | 522,557 |
| Democratic Party | Lyndon B. Johnson (incumbent) | Fuqua | 522,457 |
| Democratic Party | Lyndon B. Johnson (incumbent) | Rutland | 522,425 |
| Democratic Party | Lyndon B. Johnson (incumbent) | Smith | 522,423 |
| Democratic Party | Lyndon B. Johnson (incumbent) | Richardson | 522,408 |
| Democratic Party | Lyndon B. Johnson (incumbent) | Peters | 522,392 |
| Democratic Party | Lyndon B. Johnson (incumbent) | Gillis | 522,391 |
| Democratic Party | Lyndon B. Johnson (incumbent) | Fickling | 522,387 |
| Democratic Party | Lyndon B. Johnson (incumbent) | Lewis | 522,373 |
| Democratic Party | Lyndon B. Johnson (incumbent) | Carmichael | 522,196 |
| Democratic Party | Lyndon B. Johnson (incumbent) | Ellard | 522,189 |
| Democratic Party | Lyndon B. Johnson (incumbent) | Barnes | 522,163 |
| Write-in | | George Wallace | 39 |
| Write-in | | Richard Russell | 24 |
| Write-in | | Richard B. Russell | 24 |
| Write-in | | Herman Talmadge | 19 |
| Write-in | | William Scranton | 10 |
| Write-in | | Adlai Stevenson | 10 |
| Write-in | | Geo. Wallace | 10 |
| Write-in | | Richard Nixon | 9 |
| Write-in | | Geo. W. Wallace | 7 |
| Write-in | | Henry Cabot Lodge | 6 |
| Write-in | | Lester Maddox | 5 |
| Write-in | | Robert F. Kennedy | 4 |
| Write-in | | Robert Kennedy | 3 |
| Write-in | | Nelson Rockefeller | 3 |
| Write-in | | Walter Cronkite | 2 |
| Write-in | | Lang Gammon | 2 |
| Write-in | | Dick Russell | 2 |
| Write-in | | George C. Wallace | 2 |
| Write-in | | Thomas B. Chapman | 1 |
| Write-in | | Clifton Dewberry | 1 |
| Write-in | | Marvin Griffin | 1 |
| Write-in | | Joseph B. Lightburn | 1 |
| Write-in | | George Romney | 1 |
| Write-in | | Governor Romney | 1 |
| Write-in | | Dean Rusk | 1 |
| Write-in | | Wm. Scranton | 1 |
| Write-in | | Margaret Chase Smith | 1 |
| Write-in | | Adelaide Stevenson | 1 |
| Write-in | | Harry S. Truman | 1 |
| Write-in | | George A. Wallace | 1 |
| Write-in | | Gov. Wallace | 1 |
| Write-in | | Robert Welch | 1 |
| Total votes | | | 1,139,352 |

=== Results by county ===
| County | Barry Goldwater Republican | | Lyndon B. Johnson Democratic | | Various candidates Write-ins | | Margin | | Total votes cast |
| County | # | % | # | % | # | % | # | % | Total votes cast |
|---|---|---|---|---|---|---|---|---|---|
| Appling | 2,597 | 62.44% | 1,562 | 37.56% | | | 1,035 | 24.88% | 4,159 |
| Atkinson | 1,157 | 58.76% | 811 | 41.19% | 1 | 0.05% | 346 | 17.57% | 1,969 |
| Bacon | 2,136 | 64.43% | 1,179 | 35.57% | | | 957 | 28.86% | 3,315 |
| Baker | 914 | 60.33% | 600 | 39.60% | 1 | 0.07% | 314 | 20.73% | 1,515 |
| Baldwin | 3,430 | 55.59% | 2,740 | 44.41% | | | 690 | 11.18% | 6,170 |
| Banks | 548 | 30.34% | 1,258 | 69.66% | | | -710 | -39.32% | 1,806 |
| Barrow | 2,316 | 50.42% | 2,277 | 49.58% | | | 39 | 0.84% | 4,593 |
| Bartow | 2,813 | 37.77% | 4,635 | 62.23% | | | -1,822 | -24.46% | 7,448 |
| Ben Hill | 2,089 | 57.82% | 1,523 | 42.15% | 1 | 0.03% | 566 | 15.67% | 3,613 |
| Berrien | 4,073 | 60.51% | 2,658 | 39.49% | | | 1,415 | 21.02% | 6,731 |
| Bibb | 25,641 | 58.98% | 17,831 | 41.02% | | | 7,810 | 17.96% | 43,472 |
| Bleckley | 2,578 | 72.50% | 978 | 27.50% | | | 1,600 | 45.00% | 3,556 |
| Brantley | 1,231 | 57.52% | 909 | 42.48% | | | 322 | 15.04% | 2,140 |
| Brooks | 2,342 | 69.50% | 1,027 | 30.47% | 1 | 0.03% | 1,315 | 39.03% | 3,370 |
| Bryan | 1,433 | 62.58% | 857 | 37.42% | | | 576 | 25.16% | 2,290 |
| Bulloch | 4,823 | 63.94% | 2,720 | 36.06% | | | 2,103 | 27.88% | 7,543 |
| Burke | 3,034 | 71.52% | 1,208 | 28.48% | | | 1,826 | 43.04% | 4,242 |
| Butts | 1,261 | 45.12% | 1,534 | 54.88% | | | -273 | -9.76% | 2,795 |
| Calhoun | 1,066 | 78.67% | 289 | 21.33% | | | 777 | 57.34% | 1,355 |
| Camden | 1,802 | 51.56% | 1,693 | 48.44% | | | 109 | 3.12% | 3,495 |
| Candler | 1,710 | 68.26% | 795 | 31.74% | | | 915 | 36.52% | 2,505 |
| Carroll | 4,984 | 50.96% | 4,794 | 49.02% | 2 | 0.02% | 190 | 1.94% | 9,780 |
| Catoosa | 4,143 | 58.59% | 2,922 | 41.32% | 6 | 0.08% | 1,221 | 17.27% | 7,071 |
| Charlton | 1,179 | 67.26% | 574 | 32.74% | | | 605 | 34.52% | 1,753 |
| Chatham | 33,141 | 58.85% | 23,176 | 41.15% | 1 | 0.00% | 9,965 | 17.70% | 56,318 |
| Chattahoochee | 246 | 56.29% | 191 | 43.71% | | | 55 | 12.58% | 437 |
| Chattooga | 1,476 | 27.01% | 3,986 | 72.94% | 3 | 0.05% | -2,510 | -45.93% | 5,465 |
| Cherokee | 3,398 | 51.59% | 3,189 | 48.41% | | | 209 | 3.18% | 6,587 |
| Clarke | 4,875 | 39.33% | 7,519 | 60.67% | | | -2,644 | -21.34% | 12,394 |
| Clay | 544 | 60.04% | 360 | 39.74% | 2 | 0.22% | 184 | 20.30% | 906 |
| Clayton | 10,488 | 64.08% | 5,869 | 35.86% | 10 | 0.06% | 4,619 | 28.22% | 16,367 |
| Clinch | 1,084 | 60.56% | 706 | 39.44% | | | 378 | 21.12% | 1,790 |
| Cobb | 20,863 | 55.62% | 16,647 | 44.38% | 1 | 0.00% | 4,216 | 11.24% | 37,511 |
| Coffee | 4,392 | 61.76% | 2,719 | 38.24% | | | 1,673 | 23.52% | 7,111 |
| Colquitt | 6,493 | 71.67% | 2,563 | 28.29% | 4 | 0.04% | 3,930 | 43.38% | 9,060 |
| Columbia | 2,575 | 64.33% | 1,428 | 35.67% | | | 1,147 | 28.66% | 4,003 |
| Cook | 2,058 | 60.62% | 1,337 | 39.38% | | | 721 | 21.24% | 3,395 |
| Coweta | 3,656 | 49.62% | 3,712 | 50.38% | | | -56 | -0.76% | 7,368 |
| Crawford | 957 | 56.96% | 723 | 43.04% | | | 234 | 13.92% | 1,680 |
| Crisp | 3,337 | 65.52% | 1,756 | 34.48% | | | 1,581 | 31.04% | 5,093 |
| Dade | 1,378 | 52.84% | 1,227 | 47.05% | 3 | 0.12% | 151 | 5.79% | 2,608 |
| Dawson | 639 | 40.67% | 932 | 59.33% | | | -293 | -18.66% | 1,571 |
| Decatur | 5,060 | 71.55% | 2,011 | 28.44% | 1 | 0.01% | 3,049 | 43.11% | 7,072 |
| DeKalb | 49,448 | 57.10% | 37,154 | 42.90% | | | 12,294 | 14.20% | 86,602 |
| Dodge | 3,285 | 58.03% | 2,376 | 41.97% | | | 909 | 16.06% | 5,661 |
| Dooly | 1,662 | 53.05% | 1,471 | 46.95% | | | 191 | 6.10% | 3,133 |
| Dougherty | 12,776 | 70.88% | 5,248 | 29.12% | | | 7,528 | 41.76% | 18,024 |
| Douglas | 3,315 | 57.00% | 2,501 | 43.00% | | | 814 | 14.00% | 5,816 |
| Early | 2,398 | 75.67% | 771 | 24.33% | | | 1,627 | 51.34% | 3,169 |
| Echols | 399 | 68.44% | 184 | 31.56% | | | 215 | 36.88% | 583 |
| Effingham | 2,676 | 79.74% | 680 | 20.26% | | | 1,996 | 59.48% | 3,356 |
| Elbert | 1,887 | 37.30% | 3,172 | 62.70% | | | -1,285 | -25.40% | 5,059 |
| Emanuel | 3,311 | 59.23% | 2,279 | 40.77% | | | 1,032 | 18.46% | 5,590 |
| Evans | 1,572 | 66.30% | 799 | 33.70% | | | 773 | 32.60% | 2,371 |
| Fannin | 3,433 | 54.77% | 2,834 | 45.21% | 1 | 0.02% | 599 | 9.56% | 6,268 |
| Fayette | 1,349 | 59.98% | 896 | 39.84% | 4 | 0.18% | 453 | 20.14% | 2,249 |
| Floyd | 9,849 | 52.85% | 8,750 | 46.95% | 37 | 0.20% | 1,099 | 5.90% | 18,636 |
| Forsyth | 1,471 | 46.64% | 1,682 | 53.33% | 1 | 0.03% | -211 | -6.69% | 3,154 |
| Franklin | 864 | 23.84% | 2,758 | 76.10% | 2 | 0.06% | -1,894 | -52.26% | 3,624 |
| Fulton | 73,205 | 43.90% | 93,540 | 56.09% | 11 | 0.01% | -20,335 | -12.19% | 166,756 |
| Gilmer | 2,167 | 50.09% | 2,159 | 49.91% | | | 8 | 0.18% | 4,326 |
| Glascock | 836 | 86.19% | 134 | 13.81% | | | 702 | 72.38% | 970 |
| Glynn | 7,341 | 56.22% | 5,712 | 43.75% | 4 | 0.03% | 1,629 | 12.47% | 13,057 |
| Gordon | 2,317 | 41.55% | 3,260 | 58.45% | | | -943 | -16.90% | 5,577 |
| Grady | 2,983 | 61.25% | 1,887 | 38.75% | | | 1,096 | 22.50% | 4,870 |
| Greene | 1,093 | 28.83% | 2,698 | 71.17% | | | -1,605 | -42.34% | 3,791 |
| Gwinnett | 6,823 | 50.42% | 6,705 | 49.55% | 3 | 0.02% | 118 | 0.87% | 13,531 |
| Habersham | 1,595 | 31.84% | 3,412 | 68.12% | 2 | 0.04% | -1,817 | -36.28% | 5,009 |
| Hall | 4,296 | 34.90% | 8,003 | 65.01% | 11 | 0.09% | -3,707 | -30.11% | 12,310 |
| Hancock | 925 | 46.27% | 1,074 | 53.73% | | | -149 | -7.46% | 1,999 |
| Haralson | 3,129 | 58.85% | 2,186 | 41.11% | 2 | 0.04% | 943 | 17.74% | 5,317 |
| Harris | 2,166 | 69.74% | 940 | 30.26% | | | 1,226 | 39.48% | 3,106 |
| Hart | 1,166 | 27.00% | 3,142 | 72.77% | 10 | 0.23% | -1,976 | -45.77% | 4,318 |
| Heard | 807 | 43.18% | 1,061 | 56.77% | 1 | 0.05% | -254 | -13.59% | 1,869 |
| Henry | 3,125 | 46.58% | 3,583 | 53.41% | 1 | 0.01% | -458 | -6.83% | 6,709 |
| Houston | 6,532 | 60.53% | 4,258 | 39.46% | 1 | 0.01% | 2,274 | 21.07% | 10,791 |
| Irwin | 2,017 | 73.16% | 740 | 26.84% | | | 1,277 | 46.32% | 2,757 |
| Jackson | 1,664 | 29.62% | 3,953 | 70.38% | | | -2,289 | -40.76% | 5,617 |
| Jasper | 1,075 | 55.90% | 848 | 44.10% | | | 227 | 11.80% | 1,923 |
| Jeff Davis | 1,875 | 71.56% | 745 | 28.44% | | | 1,130 | 43.12% | 2,620 |
| Jefferson | 2,950 | 70.15% | 1,253 | 29.80% | 2 | 0.05% | 1,697 | 40.35% | 4,205 |
| Jenkins | 1,509 | 62.43% | 908 | 37.57% | | | 601 | 24.86% | 2,417 |
| Johnson | 1,940 | 73.99% | 682 | 26.01% | | | 1,258 | 47.98% | 2,622 |
| Jones | 1,805 | 56.67% | 1,380 | 43.33% | | | 425 | 13.34% | 3,185 |
| Lamar | 1,570 | 50.30% | 1,548 | 49.60% | 3 | 0.10% | 22 | 0.70% | 3,121 |
| Lanier | 719 | 52.10% | 661 | 47.90% | | | 58 | 4.20% | 1,380 |
| Laurens | 5,457 | 58.76% | 3,828 | 41.22% | 2 | 0.02% | 1,629 | 17.54% | 9,287 |
| Lee | 1,041 | 81.01% | 244 | 18.99% | | | 797 | 62.02% | 1,285 |
| Liberty | 1,458 | 39.73% | 2,212 | 60.27% | | | -754 | -20.54% | 3,670 |
| Lincoln | 943 | 72.76% | 353 | 27.24% | | | 590 | 45.52% | 1,296 |
| Long | 246 | 15.55% | 1,336 | 84.45% | | | -1,090 | -68.90% | 1,582 |
| Lowndes | 6,811 | 60.95% | 4,363 | 39.04% | 1 | 0.01% | 2,448 | 21.91% | 11,175 |
| Lumpkin | 855 | 41.81% | 1,189 | 58.14% | 1 | 0.05% | -334 | -16.33% | 2,045 |
| Macon | 1,723 | 61.56% | 1,076 | 38.44% | | | 647 | 23.12% | 2,799 |
| Madison | 1,190 | 33.70% | 2,341 | 66.30% | | | -1,151 | -32.60% | 3,531 |
| Marion | 719 | 66.27% | 365 | 33.64% | 1 | 0.09% | 354 | 32.63% | 1,085 |
| McDuffie | 2,657 | 70.27% | 1,124 | 29.73% | | | 1,533 | 40.54% | 3,781 |
| McIntosh | 795 | 39.99% | 1,193 | 60.01% | | | -398 | -20.02% | 1,988 |
| Meriwether | 2,250 | 48.14% | 2,423 | 51.84% | 1 | 0.02% | -173 | -3.70% | 4,674 |
| Miller | 1,658 | 85.82% | 274 | 14.18% | | | 1,384 | 71.64% | 1,932 |
| Mitchell | 3,265 | 73.17% | 1,197 | 26.83% | | | 2,068 | 46.34% | 4,462 |
| Monroe | 1,665 | 51.33% | 1,578 | 48.64% | 1 | 0.03% | 87 | 2.69% | 3,244 |
| Montgomery | 1,409 | 61.61% | 878 | 38.39% | | | 531 | 23.22% | 2,287 |
| Morgan | 1,485 | 47.31% | 1,654 | 52.69% | | | -169 | -5.38% | 3,139 |
| Murray | 1,064 | 30.44% | 2,426 | 69.41% | 5 | 0.14% | -1,362 | -38.97% | 3,495 |
| Muscogee | 21,025 | 62.81% | 12,446 | 37.18% | 3 | 0.01% | 8,579 | 25.63% | 33,474 |
| Newton | 2,678 | 42.52% | 3,620 | 57.48% | | | -942 | -14.96% | 6,298 |
| Oconee | 1,241 | 53.63% | 1,073 | 46.37% | | | 168 | 7.26% | 2,314 |
| Oglethorpe | 1,126 | 56.58% | 864 | 43.42% | | | 262 | 13.16% | 1,990 |
| Paulding | 1,914 | 43.23% | 2,513 | 56.77% | | | -599 | -13.54% | 4,427 |
| Peach | 1,970 | 55.40% | 1,585 | 44.57% | 1 | 0.03% | 385 | 10.83% | 3,556 |
| Pickens | 1,955 | 50.32% | 1,930 | 49.68% | | | 25 | 0.64% | 3,885 |
| Pierce | 1,981 | 66.86% | 982 | 33.14% | | | 999 | 33.72% | 2,963 |
| Pike | 1,064 | 52.94% | 946 | 47.06% | | | 118 | 5.88% | 2,010 |
| Polk | 3,282 | 41.86% | 4,555 | 58.10% | 3 | 0.04% | -1,273 | -16.24% | 7,840 |
| Pulaski | 1,768 | 64.86% | 953 | 34.96% | 5 | 0.18% | 815 | 29.90% | 2,726 |
| Putnam | 1,196 | 54.02% | 1,018 | 45.98% | | | 178 | 8.04% | 2,214 |
| Quitman | 377 | 62.11% | 230 | 37.89% | | | 147 | 24.22% | 607 |
| Rabun | 551 | 23.48% | 1,796 | 76.52% | | | -1,245 | -53.04% | 2,347 |
| Randolph | 1,656 | 63.18% | 962 | 36.70% | 3 | 0.11% | 694 | 26.48% | 2,621 |
| Richmond | 21,481 | 61.32% | 13,545 | 38.67% | 3 | 0.01% | 7,936 | 22.65% | 35,029 |
| Rockdale | 1,503 | 43.25% | 1,972 | 56.75% | | | -469 | -13.50% | 3,475 |
| Schley | 577 | 60.48% | 377 | 39.52% | | | 200 | 20.96% | 954 |
| Screven | 2,260 | 60.98% | 1,446 | 39.02% | | | 814 | 21.96% | 3,706 |
| Seminole | 1,294 | 75.19% | 427 | 24.81% | | | 867 | 50.38% | 1,721 |
| Spalding | 4,763 | 46.56% | 5,466 | 53.44% | | | -703 | -6.88% | 10,229 |
| Stephens | 1,371 | 28.24% | 3,483 | 71.76% | | | -2,112 | -43.52% | 4,854 |
| Stewart | 1,037 | 73.39% | 373 | 26.40% | 3 | 0.21% | 664 | 46.99% | 1,413 |
| Sumter | 3,774 | 68.61% | 1,727 | 31.39% | | | 2,047 | 37.22% | 5,501 |
| Talbot | 679 | 51.99% | 627 | 48.01% | | | 52 | 3.98% | 1,306 |
| Taliaferro | 337 | 34.92% | 628 | 65.08% | | | -291 | -30.16% | 965 |
| Tattnall | 3,264 | 66.45% | 1,648 | 33.55% | | | 1,616 | 32.90% | 4,912 |
| Taylor | 1,372 | 55.55% | 1,097 | 44.41% | 1 | 0.04% | 275 | 11.14% | 2,470 |
| Telfair | 1,914 | 50.55% | 1,872 | 49.45% | | | 42 | 1.10% | 3,786 |
| Terrell | 1,921 | 77.15% | 569 | 22.85% | | | 1,352 | 54.30% | 2,490 |
| Thomas | 6,306 | 65.94% | 3,257 | 34.06% | | | 3,049 | 31.88% | 9,563 |
| Tift | 4,650 | 67.04% | 2,286 | 32.96% | | | 2,364 | 34.08% | 6,936 |
| Toombs | 3,543 | 67.77% | 1,685 | 32.23% | | | 1,858 | 35.54% | 5,228 |
| Towns | 1,140 | 46.88% | 1,289 | 53.00% | 3 | 0.12% | -149 | -6.12% | 2,432 |
| Treutlen | 722 | 35.15% | 1,331 | 64.80% | 1 | 0.05% | -609 | -29.65% | 2,054 |
| Troup | 5,277 | 46.66% | 6,032 | 53.34% | | | -755 | -6.68% | 11,309 |
| Turner | 1,672 | 69.93% | 719 | 30.07% | | | 953 | 39.86% | 2,391 |
| Twiggs | 1,178 | 59.98% | 786 | 40.02% | | | 392 | 19.96% | 1,964 |
| Union | 1,473 | 40.83% | 2,135 | 59.17% | | | -662 | -18.34% | 3,608 |
| Upson | 3,103 | 48.61% | 3,275 | 51.30% | 6 | 0.09% | -172 | -2.69% | 6,384 |
| Walker | 5,939 | 52.09% | 5,454 | 47.84% | 8 | 0.07% | 485 | 4.25% | 11,401 |
| Walton | 2,874 | 54.99% | 2,350 | 44.97% | 2 | 0.04% | 524 | 10.02% | 5,226 |
| Ware | 4,948 | 48.81% | 5,189 | 51.19% | | | -241 | -2.38% | 10,137 |
| Warren | 1,070 | 73.59% | 384 | 26.41% | | | 686 | 47.18% | 1,454 |
| Washington | 2,296 | 55.63% | 1,830 | 44.34% | 1 | 0.02% | 466 | 11.29% | 4,127 |
| Wayne | 3,619 | 62.39% | 2,182 | 37.61% | | | 1,437 | 24.78% | 5,801 |
| Webster | 457 | 76.04% | 144 | 23.96% | | | 313 | 52.08% | 601 |
| Wheeler | 849 | 46.42% | 980 | 53.58% | | | -131 | -7.16% | 1,829 |
| White | 840 | 35.55% | 1,520 | 64.33% | 3 | 0.13% | -680 | -28.78% | 2,363 |
| Whitfield | 4,546 | 38.27% | 7,330 | 61.70% | 4 | 0.03% | -2,784 | -23.43% | 11,880 |
| Wilcox | 1,794 | 66.59% | 900 | 33.41% | | | 894 | 33.18% | 2,694 |
| Wilkes | 1,652 | 53.48% | 1,437 | 46.52% | | | 215 | 6.96% | 3,089 |
| Wilkinson | 2,172 | 69.28% | 963 | 30.72% | | | 1,209 | 38.56% | 3,135 |
| Worth | 3,157 | 78.55% | 862 | 21.45% | | | 2,295 | 57.10% | 4,019 |
| Totals | 616,584 | 54.12% | 522,557 | 45.87% | 195 | 0.02% | 94,027 | 8.25% | 1,139,336 |

=== Results by congressional district ===
Goldwater carried 7 of the 10 congressional districts, including six that elected Democrats.

| District | Goldwater | Johnson |
|---|---|---|
| 1st | 59.7% | 40.3% |
| 2nd | 70.1% | 29.9% |
| 3rd | 62.7% | 37.3% |
| 4th | 51.7% | 48.3% |
| 5th | 44.6% | 55.4% |
| 6th | 54% | 46% |
| 7th | 49.1% | 50.9% |
| 8th | 59.7% | 40.3% |
| 9th | 40.5% | 59.5% |
| 10th | 55.3% | 44.7% |

== Works cited ==
- Black, Earl; Black, Merle (1992). The Vital South: How Presidents Are Elected. Harvard University Press. ISBN 0674941306.
