= Long County Courthouse =

- U.S. National Register of Historic Places
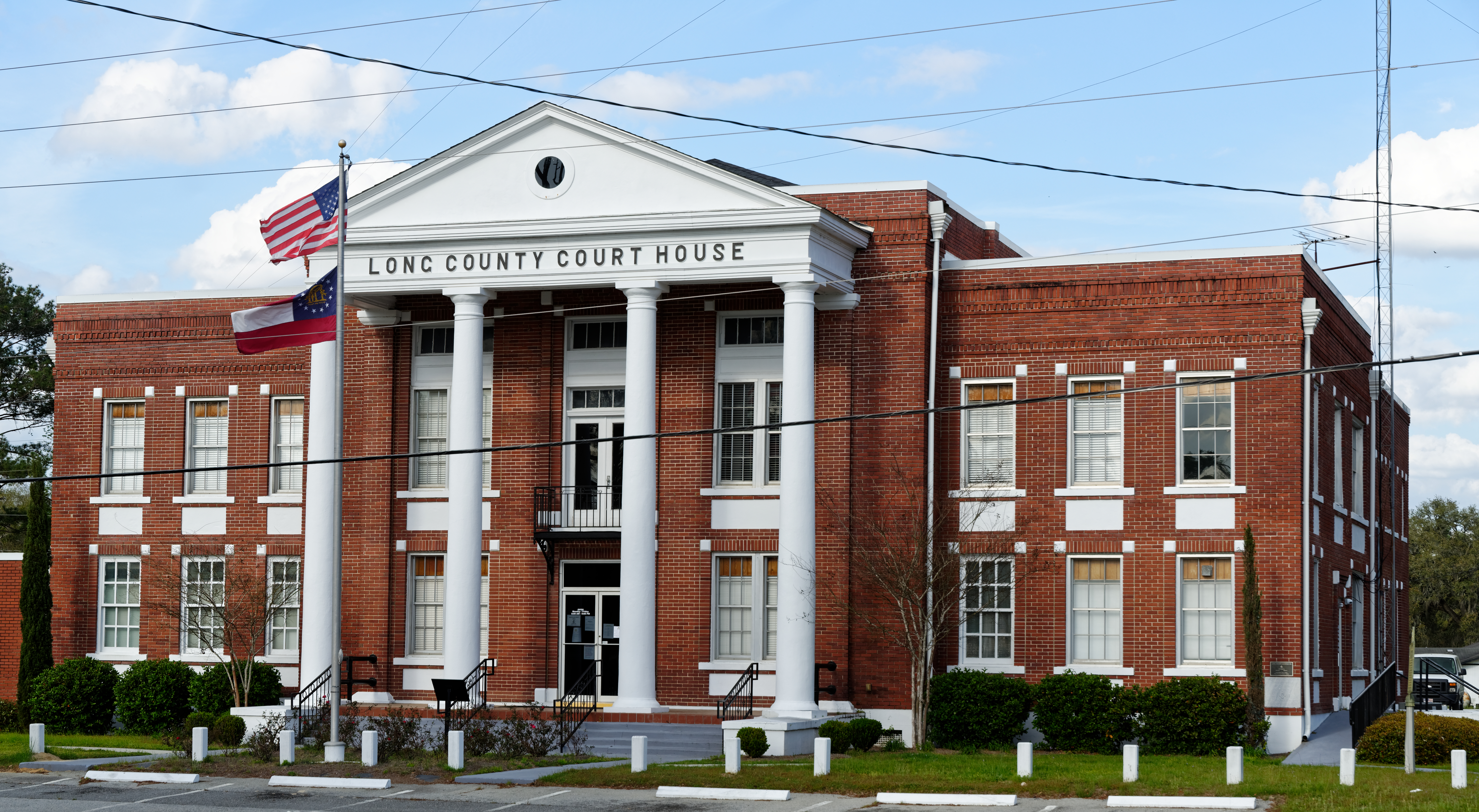
- The courthouse in 2020

- Location within Georgia
- Interactive map showing the location of Long County Courthouse
- Location: GA 57, Ludowici, Georgia
- Coordinates: 31.70775°N 81.74151°W
- Area: 1 acre (0.40 ha)
- Built: 1926
- Architectural style: Classical Revival
- MPS: Georgia County Courthouses TR
- NRHP reference No.: 80001107
- Added to NRHP: September 18, 1980

The Long County Courthouse is located in Ludowici, Georgia and is in the Neoclassical style. It was built in 1926 and the interior was renovated in 1974. It is made of brick and has a two-story portico with Tuscan columns. It is the first courthouse for Long County, which was created in 1920. It is located on Georgia State Route 57. It was added to the National Register of Historic Places in 1980.
