= Long County, Georgia =

County in Georgia, United States

- County
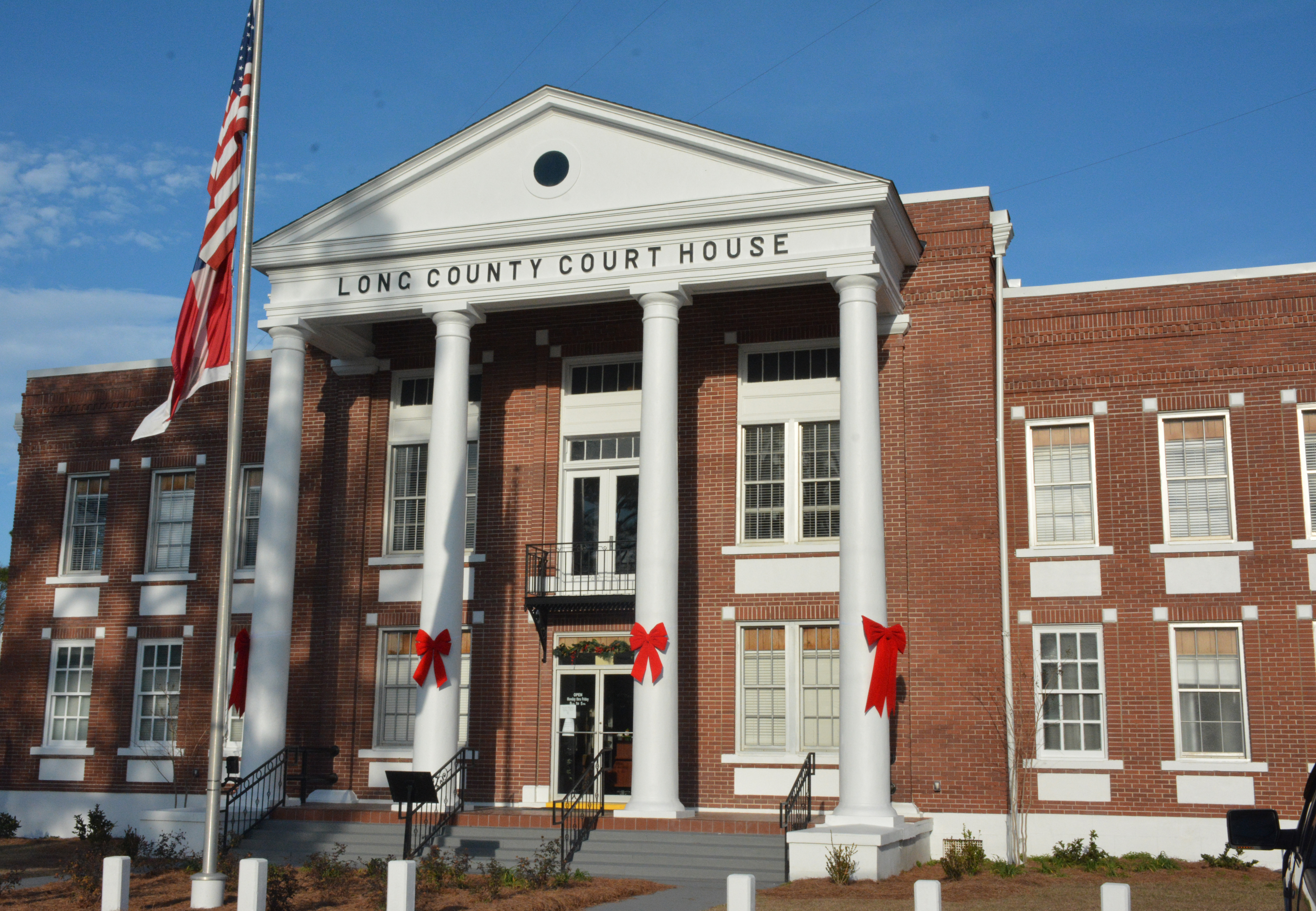
- Long County Courthouse in Ludowici

- Location within the U.S. state of Georgia
- Coordinates: 31°46′N 81°45′W
- Country: United States
- State: Georgia
- Founded: November 2, 1920; 105 years ago
- Seat: Ludowici
- Largest city: Ludowici

Area
  - Total: 404 sq mi (1,050 km^{2})
  - Land: 400 sq mi (1,000 km^{2})
  - Water: 3.5 sq mi (9.1 km^{2}) 0.9%

Population (2020)
  - Total: 16,168
  - Estimate (2025): 21,557 ▲
  - Density: 40/sq mi (15/km^{2})
- Time zone: UTC−5 (Eastern)
  - Summer (DST): UTC−4 (EDT)
- Congressional district: 1st
- Website: www.longcountyga.gov

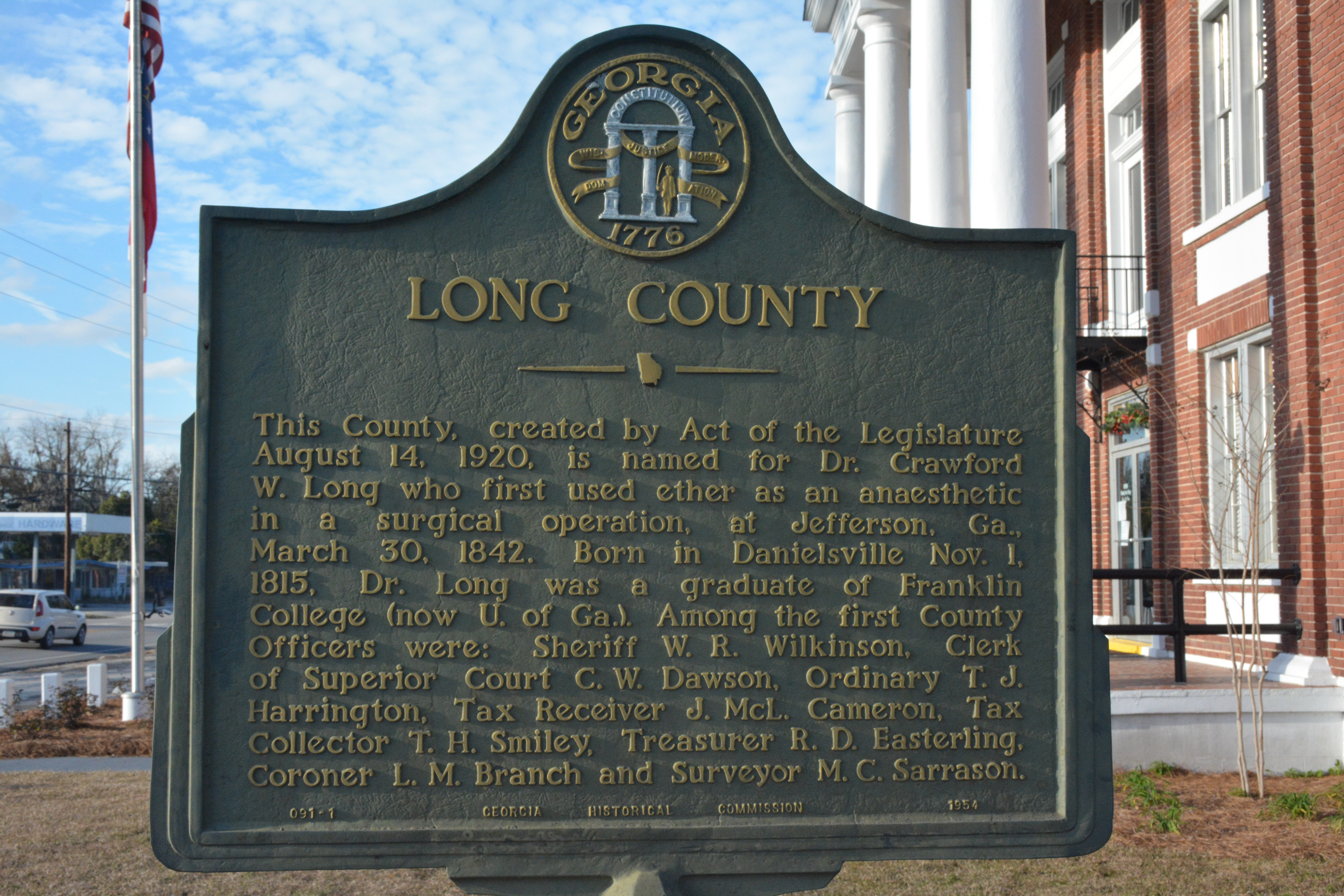
Plaque at the county courthouse

Long County is a county located in the U.S. state of Georgia. The county seat is Ludowici. Long County is part of the Hinesville-Fort Stewart Metropolitan Statistical Area. The constitutional amendment to create the county was proposed August 14, 1920, and ratified November 2, 1920. The county is named after Crawford Long (1815–1878), an American surgeon and pharmacist who was the first to use diethyl ether as an anaesthetic.

As of the 2020 census, the population was 16,168.

== Geography ==
According to the U.S. Census Bureau, the county has a total area of 404 square miles (1,050 km^{2}), of which 400 square miles (1,000 km^{2}) is land and 3.5 square miles (9.1 km^{2}) (0.9%) is water.

The majority of Long County, roughly centered on Ludowici, is located in the Altamaha River sub-basin of the basin by the same name. The county's northeastern portion, east of Glennville and northwest of Walthourville, is located in the Canoochee River sub-basin of the Ogeechee River basin. Long County's southeastern portion is located in the Ogeechee Coastal sub-basin of the larger Ogeechee basin.

=== Major highways ===
- U.S. Route 25 / U.S. Route 301 / State Route 23
- U.S. Route 84 / State Route 38
- State Route 57
- State Route 144
- State Route 196

=== Adjacent counties ===
- Liberty County (northeast)
- McIntosh County (southeast)
- Wayne County (southwest)
- Tattnall County (northwest)

== Communities ==
=== City ===
- Ludowici (county seat)

=== Unincorporated communities ===
- Aimar
- Beards Creek
- Donald
- Tibet

== Demographics ==
Historical population
| Census | Pop. | Note | %± |
|---|---|---|---|
| 1930 | 4,180 | | — |
| 1940 | 4,086 | | −2.2% |
| 1950 | 3,598 | | −11.9% |
| 1960 | 3,874 | | 7.7% |
| 1970 | 3,746 | | −3.3% |
| 1980 | 4,524 | | 20.8% |
| 1990 | 6,202 | | 37.1% |
| 2000 | 10,304 | | 66.1% |
| 2010 | 14,464 | | 40.4% |
| 2020 | 16,168 | | 11.8% |
| 2025 (est.) | 21,557 | ▲ | 33.3% |
U.S. Decennial Census; 1790-1880 1890-1910; 1920-1930 1930-1940; 1940-1950 1960-1980; 1980-2000 2010

=== Racial and ethnic composition ===
Long County, Georgia – Racial and ethnic composition Note: the US Census treats Hispanic/Latino as an ethnic category. This table excludes Latinos from the racial categories and assigns them to a separate category. Hispanics/Latinos may be of any race.
| Race / Ethnicity (NH = Non-Hispanic) | Pop 1980 | Pop 1990 | Pop 2000 | Pop 2010 | Pop 2020 | % 1980 | % 1990 | % 2000 | % 2010 | % 2020 |
|---|---|---|---|---|---|---|---|---|---|---|
| White alone (NH) | 3,311 | 4,608 | 6,678 | 8,491 | 8,774 | 73.19% | 74.30% | 64.81% | 58.70% | 54.27% |
| Black or African American alone (NH) | 1,130 | 1,337 | 2,429 | 3,541 | 4,028 | 24.98% | 21.56% | 23.57% | 24.48% | 24.91% |
| Native American or Alaska Native alone (NH) | 1 | 23 | 63 | 76 | 62 | 0.02% | 0.37% | 0.61% | 0.53% | 0.38% |
| Asian alone (NH) | 7 | 40 | 58 | 110 | 164 | 0.15% | 0.64% | 0.56% | 0.76% | 1.01% |
| Native Hawaiian or Pacific Islander alone (NH) | x | x | 25 | 51 | 88 | x | x | 0.24% | 0.35% | 0.54% |
| Other race alone (NH) | 4 | 5 | 16 | 32 | 91 | 0.09% | 0.08% | 0.16% | 0.22% | 0.56% |
| Mixed race or Multiracial (NH) | x | x | 165 | 385 | 982 | x | x | 1.60% | 2.66% | 6.07% |
| Hispanic or Latino (any race) | 71 | 189 | 870 | 1,778 | 1,979 | 1.57% | 3.05% | 8.44% | 12.29% | 12.24% |
| Total | 4,524 | 6,202 | 10,304 | 14,464 | 16,168 | 100.00% | 100.00% | 100.00% | 100.00% | 100.00% |

=== 2020 census ===
As of the 2020 census, the county had a population of 16,168, 5,492 households, and 4,146 families residing in the county. The median age was 31.8 years, 30.5% of residents were under the age of 18, and 9.5% of residents were 65 years of age or older. For every 100 females there were 98.6 males, and for every 100 females age 18 and over there were 97.9 males age 18 and over. 19.8% of residents lived in urban areas, while 80.2% lived in rural areas.

The racial makeup of the county was 56.9% White, 25.5% Black or African American, 0.8% American Indian and Alaska Native, 1.1% Asian, 0.6% Native Hawaiian and Pacific Islander, 5.6% from some other race, and 9.5% from two or more races. Hispanic or Latino residents of any race comprised 12.2% of the population.

There were 5,492 households in the county, of which 43.6% had children under the age of 18 living with them and 23.6% had a female householder with no spouse or partner present. About 21.5% of all households were made up of individuals and 6.9% had someone living alone who was 65 years of age or older.

There were 6,180 housing units, of which 11.1% were vacant. Among occupied housing units, 64.5% were owner-occupied and 35.5% were renter-occupied. The homeowner vacancy rate was 1.8% and the rental vacancy rate was 14.5%.

== Education ==
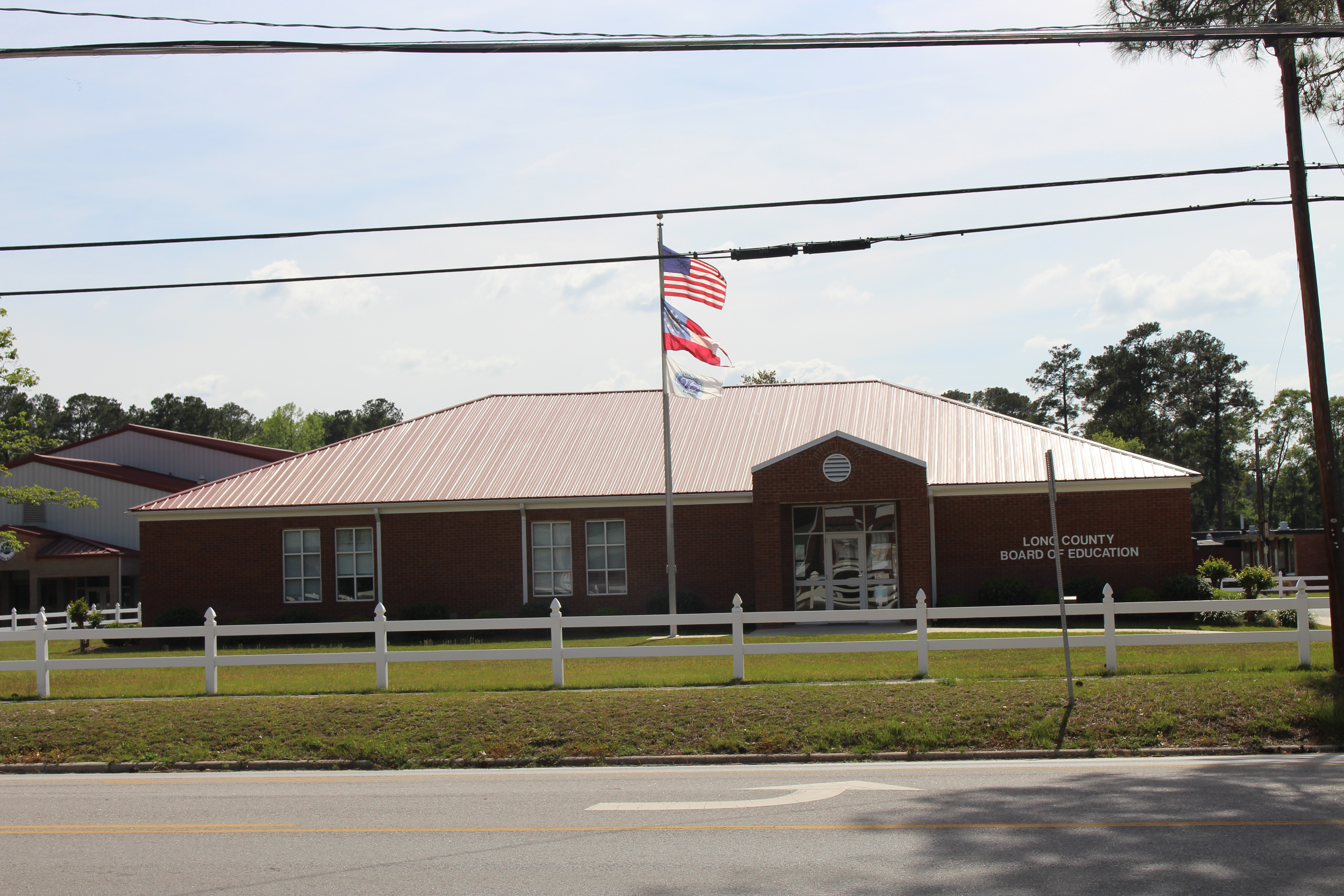
Long County Board of Education building

Long County School System operates public schools for grades Pre-K-12 in the county, except parts in Fort Stewart. Fort Stewart has the Department of Defense Education Activity (DoDEA) as its local school district, for the elementary level. Students at the secondary level on Fort Stewart attend public schools operated by county school districts.

== Politics ==
As of the 2020s, Long County is a Republican stronghold, voting 64.6% for Donald Trump in 2024. For elections to the United States House of Representatives, Long County is part of Georgia's 1st congressional district, currently represented by Buddy Carter. For elections to the Georgia State Senate, Long County is part of District 19. For elections to the Georgia House of Representatives, Long County is part of District 167.

United States presidential election results for Long County, Georgia
| Year | Republican | | Democratic | | Third party(ies) | |
| Year | No. | % | No. | % | No. | % |
|---|---|---|---|---|---|---|
| 1924 | 19 | 3.37% | 499 | 88.48% | 46 | 8.16% |
| 1928 | 401 | 70.72% | 166 | 29.28% | 0 | 0.00% |
| 1932 | 14 | 3.12% | 430 | 95.77% | 5 | 1.11% |
| 1936 | 51 | 14.21% | 305 | 84.96% | 3 | 0.84% |
| 1940 | 76 | 19.14% | 319 | 80.35% | 2 | 0.50% |
| 1944 | 129 | 28.86% | 318 | 71.14% | 0 | 0.00% |
| 1948 | 25 | 4.87% | 337 | 65.69% | 151 | 29.43% |
| 1952 | 420 | 37.80% | 691 | 62.20% | 0 | 0.00% |
| 1956 | 281 | 19.04% | 1,195 | 80.96% | 0 | 0.00% |
| 1960 | 898 | 76.36% | 278 | 23.64% | 0 | 0.00% |
| 1964 | 246 | 15.55% | 1,336 | 84.45% | 0 | 0.00% |
| 1968 | 156 | 8.83% | 574 | 32.48% | 1,037 | 58.69% |
| 1972 | 764 | 76.40% | 236 | 23.60% | 0 | 0.00% |
| 1976 | 222 | 15.15% | 1,243 | 84.85% | 0 | 0.00% |
| 1980 | 514 | 29.49% | 1,202 | 68.96% | 27 | 1.55% |
| 1984 | 1,099 | 57.39% | 816 | 42.61% | 0 | 0.00% |
| 1988 | 858 | 55.32% | 681 | 43.91% | 12 | 0.77% |
| 1992 | 719 | 36.74% | 874 | 44.66% | 364 | 18.60% |
| 1996 | 791 | 40.11% | 936 | 47.46% | 245 | 12.42% |
| 2000 | 1,320 | 57.04% | 975 | 42.13% | 19 | 0.82% |
| 2004 | 1,994 | 65.57% | 1,033 | 33.97% | 14 | 0.46% |
| 2008 | 2,119 | 61.24% | 1,288 | 37.23% | 53 | 1.53% |
| 2012 | 2,306 | 60.45% | 1,442 | 37.80% | 67 | 1.76% |
| 2016 | 2,626 | 63.78% | 1,360 | 33.03% | 131 | 3.18% |
| 2020 | 3,527 | 62.31% | 2,035 | 35.95% | 98 | 1.73% |
| 2024 | 4,557 | 64.58% | 2,476 | 35.09% | 23 | 0.33% |

United States Senate election results for Long County, Georgia2
| Year | Republican | | Democratic | | Third party(ies) | |
| Year | No. | % | No. | % | No. | % |
|---|---|---|---|---|---|---|
| 2020 | 3,389 | 60.72% | 2,029 | 36.36% | 163 | 2.92% |
| 2020 | 2,838 | 61.26% | 1,795 | 38.74% | 0 | 0.00% |

United States Senate election results for Long County, Georgia3
| Year | Republican | | Democratic | | Third party(ies) | |
| Year | No. | % | No. | % | No. | % |
|---|---|---|---|---|---|---|
| 2020 | 1,708 | 30.90% | 1,233 | 22.31% | 2,586 | 46.79% |
| 2020 | 2,835 | 61.13% | 1,803 | 38.87% | 0 | 0.00% |
| 2022 | 2,759 | 62.68% | 1,548 | 35.17% | 95 | 2.16% |
| 2022 | 2,445 | 62.42% | 1,472 | 37.58% | 0 | 0.00% |

Georgia Gubernatorial election results for Long County
| Year | Republican | | Democratic | | Third party(ies) | |
| Year | No. | % | No. | % | No. | % |
|---|---|---|---|---|---|---|
| 2022 | 2,944 | 66.74% | 1,443 | 32.71% | 24 | 0.54% |

== See also ==
- National Register of Historic Places listings in Long County, Georgia
- List of counties in Georgia
