= Ludowici, Georgia =

City in the US state of Georgia

- City
- Location in Long County and the state of Georgia
- Coordinates: 31°42′38″N 81°44′40″W
- Country: United States
- State: Georgia
- County: Long

Area
  - Total: 2.88 sq mi (7.47 km^{2})
  - Land: 2.87 sq mi (7.44 km^{2})
  - Water: 0.012 sq mi (0.03 km^{2})
- Elevation: 66 ft (20 m)

Population (2020)
  - Total: 1,590
  - Density: 553.8/sq mi (213.82/km^{2})
- Time zone: UTC-5 (Eastern (EST))
  - Summer (DST): UTC-4 (EDT)
- ZIP code: 31316
- Area code: 912
- FIPS code: 13-47784
- GNIS feature ID: 0356371
- Website: https://www.longcountyeda.com/ludowici

Ludowici (/ˌluːdəˈwɪsɪ/) is a city in Long County, Georgia, United States. As of the 2020 census, Ludowici had a population of 1,590. The city is the county seat of Long County. It is a part of the Hinesville-Fort Stewart metropolitan area.

Within the city, the Long County Courthouse and Ludowici Well Pavilion are listed on the National Register of Historic Places.

== History ==
=== Founding ===
The city's origins dated to the 1840s when the Atlantic and Gulf Railroad established a stop referred to as "Four and a Half". The station was constructed across from the house of a landowner named Allen Johnston, leading people to call the surrounding settlement Johnston Station by the time of Johnston's death in 1859. In 1898 there was an effort to rename the area Liberty City to help distinguish it from other places with 'Johnston' in their names. In following years both names were used interchangeably.

In 1900 the settlement's population was about 300 and featured telegraph, post, and express offices. Racial tensions were a source of conflict, with at least two white and three black citizens reported to have been killed during a riot that summer. In the fall of 1900 an African American, H. F. McKay, was elected to the Georgia State Senate to represent Ludowici as part of what was then Liberty County, Georgia.

=== Ludowici Roofing Tile ===
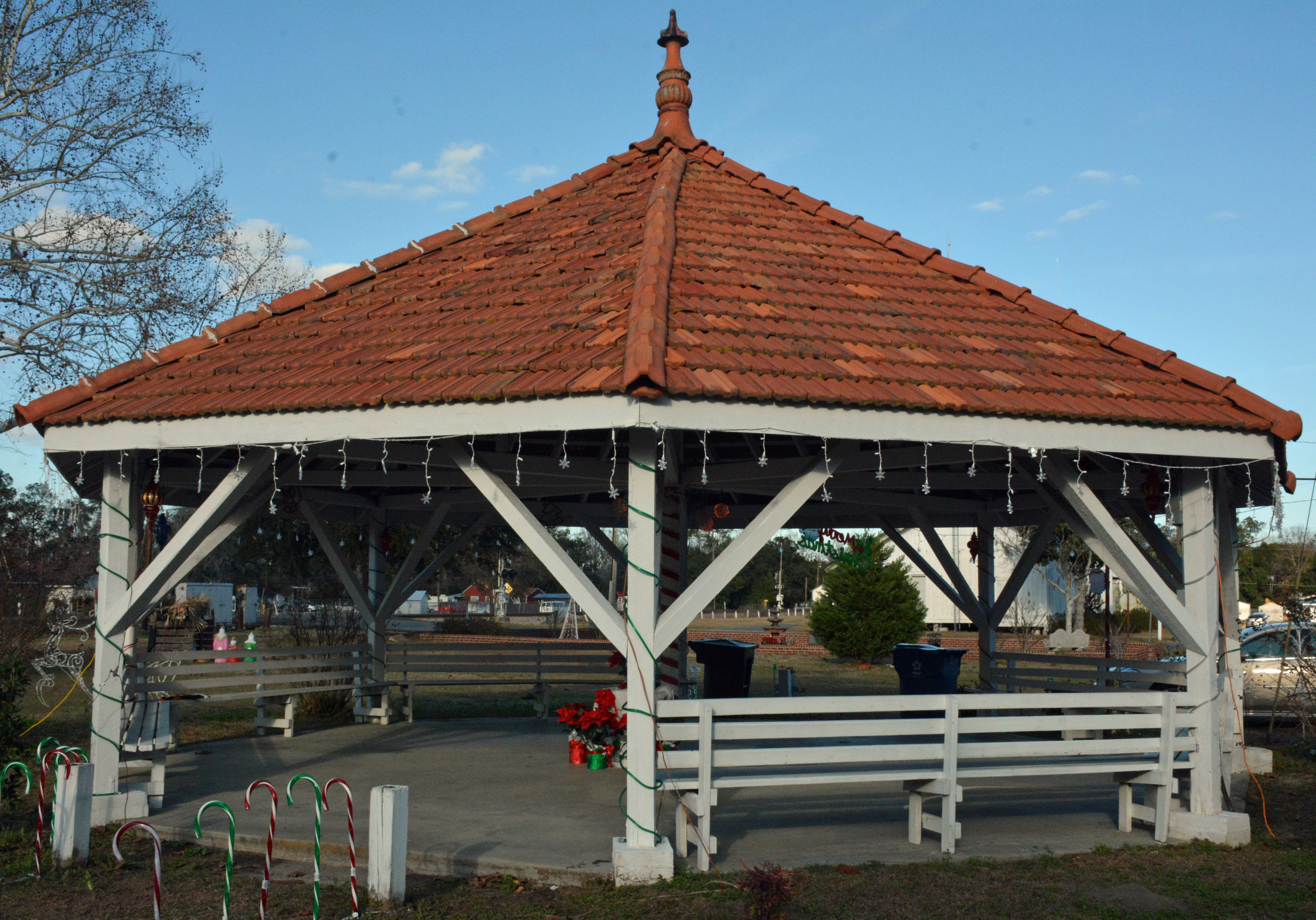
The Ludowici Well Pavilion, roofed using Ludowici clay tiles

In 1902, H.B. Skeele of the Ludowici Roofing Tile Company traveled to Savannah and announced that his company planned to open a roof tile factory in Liberty City the following spring. At the time the company operated a factory in Chicago Heights, Illinois, and Skeele said he was drawn to start their second location in Georgia due to the warmer climate, large clay deposits, and the presence of black workers who could be paid less than the white employees who the company hired further north.

When the community was raising money to cover the cost of constructing a high school in 1905, the Ludowici company made a generous donation of funds and roofing material. Later that year the city, which had previously been an unincorporated community, was incorporated as Ludowici, Georgia, in the company's honor.

The Ludowici tile factory covered more than 1,100 acres (450 ha) and employed around 100 workers. The roof tiles produced at this plant were stamped "Ludowici - Dixie" and for many years it was said that "red roofing tile covers every dwelling, barn and chicken coop in Long County."

Tiles produced at this factory were used for thousands of projects throughout the American southeast and abroad. Starting in 1906 the factory began to produce a large quantity of material to be used on American government buildings in the Panama Canal Zone. After those orders were completed in 1913 the company opted to close the Georgia factory due to lack of sufficient local orders. The company, then known as the Ludowici-Celadon Company, shifted operations to their remaining plants. It remains in operation in New Lexington, Ohio, to this day.

In the following decades many of Ludowici's tiled roofs were replaced or traded away. Ludowici gradually reverted to a rural, agricultural economy.

=== Speed trap designation ===
Before interstate highways were constructed, all motorists traveled on regular U.S. highways. Ludowici was at the crossroads of three U.S. highways, Routes 25, 82 and 301. Many vacationers on their way to Florida passed through Ludowici.

The city gained notoriety during the 1950s and 1960s for its aggressive traffic enforcement policies. The AAA went so far as to specifically label Ludowici as a speed trap. Members of the local police force were allegedly engaging in manipulation of the timing of the traffic signal downtown, so as to catch unsuspecting out-of-area motorists "running" a suddenly changed red light. The switch for the stop light was located in the barber shop. The traffic light was at an intersection that was bypassed by a shortcut (Main Street – see a local map) so that local residents would not even come to the light when making the turn at the light. Thus, all the tickets went to nonresidents without the police having to be selective since no locals would be at the light. A song was also written about the town.

Governor Lester Maddox posted billboards warning tourists to avoid the town because ticket-related corruption was so bad. Word of mouth and media exposure caused many motorists to detour around Ludowici. A 1970 TIME article said that Ludowici was "one of the last remaining speed traps in the country."

Comedian Mickey Sharp described Ludowici in 1971:

They have only three things there—a speed sign, a squad car and the sheriff. You pass one, and you meet the other two.

In 1983, the Ludowici police department was stripped of its license to use radar guns by the Georgia State Patrol. The state invalidated all 1,553 traffic citations the city had issued between January 1982 and October 1983 due to errors and violations found in a state investigation.

Reason reported that "In the end, Ludowici was brought down not by Maddox, but by Interstate 95. Tourists no longer had to run a gauntlet of cops and flim-flam men to reach Florida's sunnier climes, and the town faded into well-deserved obscurity."

== Geography ==
Ludowici, in southeast Georgia, is located 30 miles (48 km) from the Atlantic coast. Nearby communities include Jesup 11 miles (18 km) to the southwest via US Routes 301, 84, and 25; Darien 32 miles (51 km) to the southeast via State Route 57; Hinesville/Fort Stewart 15 miles (24 km) to the northeast via US 84; and Glennville 21 miles (34 km) to the northwest via US 301 and 25.

According to the United States Census Bureau, Ludowici has a total area of 2.4 square miles (6.1 km^{2}), of which 0.01 square miles (0.03 km^{2}), or 0.54%, are water. The city drains west to Jones Creek and east to Doctors Creek, both tributaries of the Altamaha River.

== Demographics ==
Historical population
Census	Pop.	Note	%±
1910	541		—
1920	515		−4.8%
1930	615		19.4%
1940	866		40.8%
1950	1,332		53.8%
1960	1,578		18.5%
1970	1,419		−10.1%
1980	1,286		−9.4%
1990	1,291		0.4%
2000	1,440		11.5%
2010	1,703		18.3%
2020	1,590		−6.6%
2023 (est.)	1,846	▲	16.1%
U.S. Decennial Census

=== 2020 census ===
As of the 2020 census, Ludowici had a population of 1,590. The median age was 35.9 years. 27.8% of residents were under the age of 18 and 17.9% were 65 years of age or older. For every 100 females there were 86.8 males, and for every 100 females age 18 and over there were 78.3 males age 18 and over.

0.0% of residents lived in urban areas, while 100.0% lived in rural areas.

There were 581 households in Ludowici, of which 42.2% had children under the age of 18 living in them. Of all households, 38.6% were married-couple households, 20.8% were households with a male householder and no spouse or partner present, and 33.6% were households with a female householder and no spouse or partner present. About 26.5% of all households were made up of individuals and 13.5% had someone living alone who was 65 years of age or older.

There were 643 housing units, of which 9.6% were vacant. The homeowner vacancy rate was 1.7% and the rental vacancy rate was 10.9%.

Ludowici racial composition as of 2020
Race	Num.	Perc.
White (non-Hispanic)	918	57.74%
Black or African American (non-Hispanic)	495	31.13%
Asian	4	0.25%
Pacific Islander	1	0.06%
Other/Mixed	92	5.79%
Hispanic or Latino	80	5.03%

== Education ==
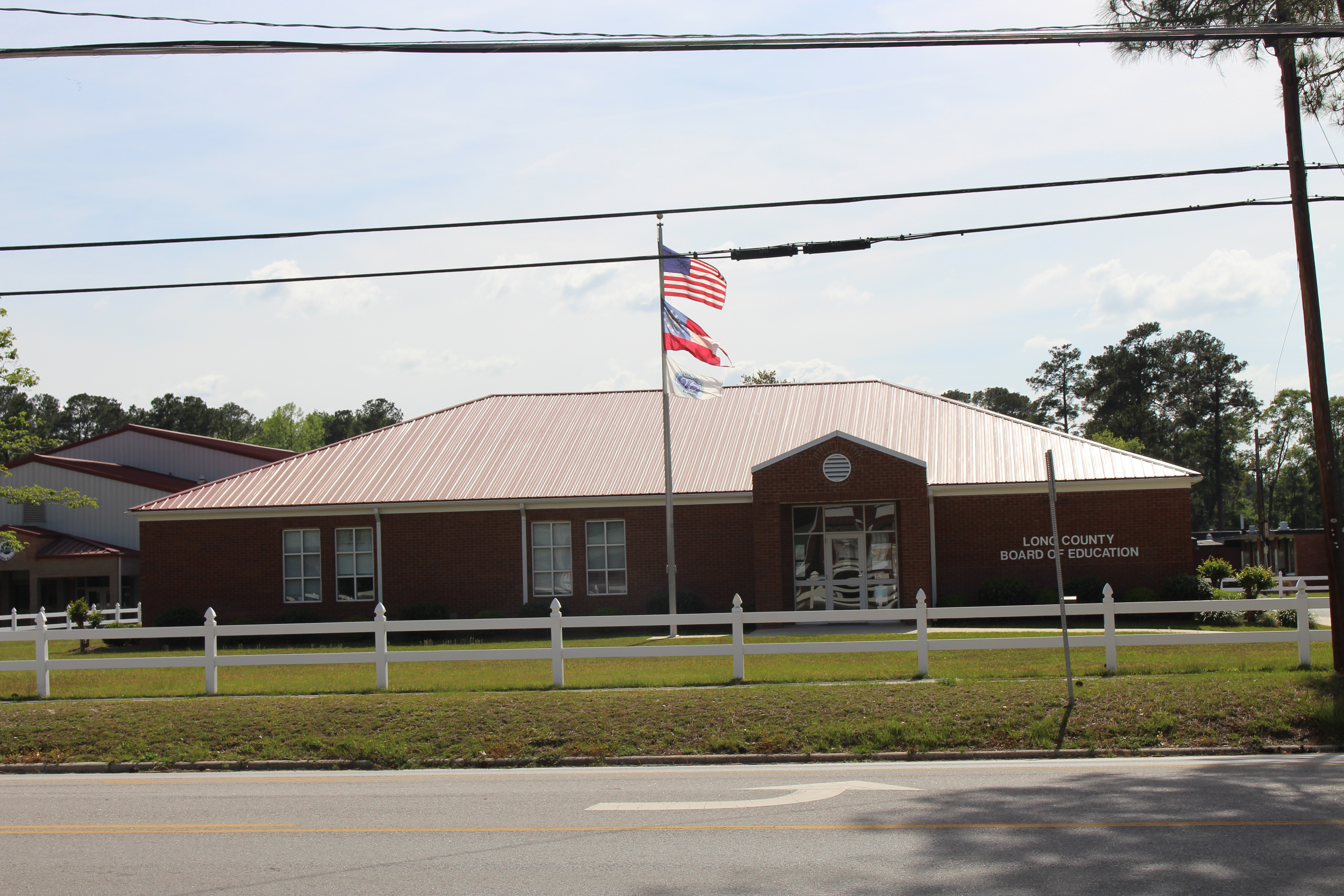
Long County Board of Education building

=== Long County School District ===
The Long County School District, which covers the municipality, holds pre-school to grade twelve, and consists of two elementary schools, a middle school, and a high school. The district has 119 full-time teachers and over 3,285 students.

- Smiley Elementary School
- McClelland Elementary School
- Long County Middle School
- Long County High School

=== Private education ===
- Faith Baptist Christian School

== Notable people ==
- Tariq Carpenter, American professional football player.
- Antonius Cleveland, American professional basketball player, attended high school in Ludowici.
- Jamin Davis, American professional football player, attended high school in Ludowici.
- J. J. Frazier, American professional basketball player.
- D'Moi Hodge, British Virgin Islander professional basketball player, attended high school in Ludowici.
- Dustin McGowan, American former professional baseball player.
- Chidi Okeke, Nigerian-American professional football player.
- Chavez Young, Bahamian professional baseball player who attended high school in Ludowici.

== See also ==
- Ludowici Roof Tile

=== Other speed traps ===
- Speed traps:
  - Coleman, Florida, the American Automobile Association (AAA) named it the nation's biggest speed trap city in 1966
  - Hacienda Village, Florida, a former village that was disincorporated in 1984 for their excessive abuse of speed traps and corrupt government
  - Hampton, Florida a town that was almost disincorporated in 2014, in part due to "speed trap" behavior
  - Lawtey, Florida, a city previously known as a speed trap by the American Automobile Association (AAA) before August 2018
  - New Rome, Ohio, a former village that was disincorporated in 2004 for speed traps and corrupt government
  - Patton Village, Texas, a city known for its speed trap and government corruption
  - Waldo, Florida, much like Lawtey, it was also a Florida city previously known as a speed trap by the American Automobile Association (AAA) before August 2018
