= List of places in Georgia (U.S. state) (A–D) =

This list of current cities, towns, unincorporated communities, counties, and other recognized places in the U.S. state of Georgia also includes information on the number and names of counties in which the place lies, and its lower and upper ZIP Code bounds, if applicable.

Name of place	Number of counties	Principal county	Lower zip code	Upper zip code
Aaron	1	Bulloch County	30450	
Abac	1	Tift County	31794	
Abba	1	Irwin County	31750	
Abbeville	1	Wilcox County	31001	
Abbottsford	1	Troup County	30240	
Abercorn Heights	1	Chatham County		
Aberdeen	1	Fayette County	30269	
Abernathys Mill	1	Haralson County		
Abilene	1	Carroll County		
Abraham Baldwin College	1	Tift County		
Abt	1	Floyd County		
Achord	1	Dodge County		
Acorn Pond	1	Worth County		
Acree	1	Dougherty County	31791	
Acworth	1	Cobb County	30101	
Adabelle	1	Bulloch County		
Adairsville	1	Bartow County	30103	
Adams Crossroads	1	Gwinnett County		
Adamson	1	Heard County		
Adams Park	1	Fulton County		
Adams Park	1	Twiggs County	31020	
Adamsville	1	Fulton County		
Adasburg	1	Wilkes County	30673	
Adel	1	Cook County	31620	
Adelaide	1	Mitchell County		
Adgateville	1	Jasper County	31038	
Adrian	2	Emanuel County	31002	
Adrian	2	Johnson County	31002	
Aerial	1	Habersham County		
Afton	1	Dawson County		
Aglico	1	Clayton County		
Agnes	1	Lincoln County	30817	
Agnes Scott College	1	DeKalb County	30030	
Agricola	1	Glascock County		
Ai	1	Gilmer County		
Aid	1	Franklin County	30521	
Aikenton	1	Jasper County		
Ailey	1	Montgomery County	30410	
Air Force Plant No. 6	1	Cobb County	30060	
Airline	1	Hart County	30516	
Airport Mail Facility	1	Clayton County	30320	
Airport Subdivision	1	Lowndes County	31601	
Akes	1	Polk County		
Akins	1	Bulloch County		
Akins Mill	1	Bulloch County		
Akridge	1	Grady County		
Alabama Junction	1	Chatham County		
Alaculsy	1	Murray County		
Alamo	1	Wheeler County	30411	
Alapaha	1	Berrien County	31622	
Albany	1	Dougherty County	31701	08
Albany-Dougherty County Airport	1	Dougherty County	31707	
Albany Marine Corps Supply Center	1	Dougherty County		
Albany Naval Air Station	1	Dougherty County	31701	
Albion Acres	1	Richmond County	30906	
Alcorns	1	Laurens County		
Alcovy	1	Newton County	30209	
Alcovy Mountain	1	Walton County		
Alcovy Shores	1	Jasper County	31064	
Aldora	1	Lamar County	30204	
Alexander	1	Burke County	30456	
Alexis	1	Echols County		
Alford	1	Hart County	30643	
Alfords	1	Worth County	31791	
Aline	1	Candler County	30420	
Allatoona	1	Bartow County		
Allen City	1	Gwinnett County	30136	
Allendale	1	Gwinnett County	30245	
Allendale	1	Muscogee County		
Allenhurst	1	Liberty County	31301	
Allentown	4	Bleckley County	31003	
Allentown	4	Laurens County	31003	
Allentown	4	Twiggs County	31003	
Allentown	4	Wilkinson County	31003	
Allenville	1	Berrien County	31639	
Allenwood	1	Baldwin County	31061	
Allie	1	Meriwether County	30222	
Alligood	1	Laurens County		
Allon	1	Crawford County		
Alma	1	Bacon County	31510	
Almira	1	Jefferson County		
Almon	1	Newton County	30209	
Alpharetta	1	Fulton County	30201	
Alpine	1	Chattooga County	30731	
Alps	1	Meriwether County	30202	
Alston	1	Montgomery County	30412	
Altamaha	1	Tattnall County	30453	
Altamaha Park	1	Glynn County		
Alta Vista	1	Muscogee County		
Altman	2	Banks County	30467	
Altman	2	Screven County	30467	
Alto	2	Banks County	30510	
Alto	2	Habersham County	30510	
Alto Park	1	Floyd County	30161	
Alvaton	1	Meriwether County	30218	
Alvin	1	Madison County		
Amboy	1	Turner County	31714	
Ambrose	1	Coffee County	31512	
Amco	1	Jasper County		
Americus	1	Sumter County	31709	
Amicalola	1	Dawson County		
Amity	1	Lincoln County	30817	
Amos Mill	1	Dade County		
Amsterdam	1	Decatur County	31734	
Amzi	1	Murray County	30705	
Anderson City	1	Worth County	31744	
Anderson Mill	1	Bulloch County		
Andersonville	1	Cherokee County		
Andersonville	1	Sumter County	31711	
Andersonville National Historic Site	2	Macon County	31711	
Andersonville National Historic Site	2	Sumter County	31711	
Andrews Crossroads	1	Meriwether County		
Angelville	1	Gordon County		
Anguilla	1	Glynn County	31520	
Anguilla Junction	1	Glynn County		
Ansley Mill	1	McDuffie County		
Anthony Terrace	1	Bibb County		
Antioch	1	Polk County	30125	
Antioch	1	Rabun County		
Antioch	1	Troup County	30240	
Aonia	1	Wilkes County	30673	
Apalachee	1	Morgan County	30650	
Appalachian National Scenic Trail	7	Fannin County	25425	
Appalachian National Scenic Trail	7	Gilmer County	25425	
Appalachian National Scenic Trail	7	Lumpkin County	25425	
Appalachian National Scenic Trail	7	Rabun County	25425	
Appalachian National Scenic Trail	7	Towns County	25425	
Appalachian National Scenic Trail	7	Union County	25425	
Appalachian National Scenic Trail	7	White County	25425	
Apple Valley	1	Jackson County	30529	
Appling	1	Columbia County	30802	
Arabi	1	Crisp County	31712	
Aragon	1	Polk County	30104	
Aragon Park	1	Richmond County	30901	
Arcade	1	Jackson County	30549	
Arch City	1	Gordon County	30701	
Archery	1	Webster County	31780	
Arco	1	Glynn County	31520	
Arcola	1	Bulloch County	30415	
Ardick	1	McIntosh County		
Ardmore	1	Effingham County	31329	
Ardsley Park	1	Chatham County		
Argyle	1	Clinch County	31623	
Arkwright	1	Bibb County	31204	
Arles	1	Sumter County		
Arlington	2	Calhoun County	31713	
Arlington	2	Early County	31713	
Arlington Park	1	Bibb County		
Armboy	1	Turner County		
Armena	1	Lee County		
Armstrong	1	Bibb County		
Armuchee	1	Floyd County	30105	
Arnco Mills	1	Coweta County	30263	
Arnold Mill	1	Fulton County		
Arnoldsville	1	Oglethorpe County	30619	
Arp	1	Irwin County	31783	
Arrowhead Village	1	Clayton County	30236	
Ashburn	1	Turner County	31714	
Ashford Park	1	DeKalb County	30319	
Ashintilly	1	McIntosh County	31331	
Ashland	1	Franklin County	30521	
Ashton	1	Ben Hill County		
Aska	1	Fannin County		
Aspinwall	1	Pierce County		
Astoria	1	Ware County		
Atco	1	Bartow County	30120	
Athena Park	1	Clarke County		
Athens	1	Clarke County	30601	13
Athens-Clarke County	1	Clarke County		
Athens Municipal Airport	1	Clarke County	30605	
Athens Navy Supply Corps School	1	Clarke County		
Atkinson	1	Brantley County	31543	
Atlanta	2	DeKalb County	30301	99
Atlanta	2	Fulton County	30301	99
Atlanta Army Depot	1	Clayton County	30050	
Atlanta Baptist College	1	DeKalb County	30341	
Atlanta Junction	1	Floyd County		
Atlanta Naval Air Station	1	Cobb County	30060	
Attapulgus	1	Decatur County	31715	
Attica	1	Jackson County	30601	
Atwater	1	Upson County		
Atwell	1	Jefferson County		
Aubrey	1	Bartow County		
Aubrey	1	Heard County		
Auburn	2	Barrow County	30203	
Auburn	2	Gwinnett County	30203	
Audubon	1	Gordon County	30735	
Augusta	1	Richmond County	30901	19
Augusta-Richmond County	1	Richmond County		
Auraria	1	Lumpkin County	30534	
Ausmac	1	Decatur County		
Austell	2	Cobb County	30001	
Austell	2	Douglas County	30001	
Austin	1	Morgan County	30663	
Autreyville	1	Colquitt County	31768	
Autry	1	Hall County	30501	
Avalon	1	Chatham County	31406	
Avalon	1	Stephens County	30557	
Avans	1	Dade County	30752	
Avants	1	Wheeler County		
Avera	1	Jefferson County	30803	
Avert Acres	1	Dougherty County	31701	
Avery	1	Cherokee County	30114	
Avondale	1	Bibb County	31206	
Avondale	1	Chatham County		
Avondale	1	McDuffie County	30814	
Avondale	1	Muscogee County		
Avondale Estates	1	DeKalb County	30002	
Avon Park	1	Chatham County		
Axson	1	Atkinson County	31624	
Aycock Mill	1	Randolph County		
Ayersville	1	Stephens County	30577	
Azalea Park	1	Bibb County		
Babcock	1	Miller County		
Back Landing	1	Glynn County		
Bacon Park	1	Chatham County	31406	
Baconton	1	Mitchell County	31716	
Baden	1	Brooks County		
Baileys Park	1	Bleckley County		
Bainbridge	1	Decatur County	31717	
Bairdstown	2	Greene County	30669	
Bairdstown	2	Oglethorpe County	30669	
Bakers Crossing	1	Chatham County		
Baker Village	1	Muscogee County	31903	
Baldwin	2	Banks County	30511	
Baldwin	2	Habersham County	30511	
Baldwinville	1	Talbot County	31812	
Ballew Mill	1	Fannin County		
Ball Ground	1	Cherokee County	30107	
Ball Ground	1	Murray County	30705	
Baltimore	1	Wilkes County	30673	
Bamburg	1	Echols County		
Bancroft	1	Early County		
Banning	1	Carroll County	30185	
Banning Mills	1	Carroll County		
Bannockburn	1	Berrien County	31639	
Barbers	1	Colquitt County		
Barin	1	Muscogee County		
Barkers Crossroads	1	Heard County	30217	
Barker Spring	1	Upson County	30286	
Barksdale	1	Washington County	31082	
Barnes Crossroads	1	Meriwether County		
Barnesdale	1	Cook County		
Barnesville	1	Lamar County	30204	
Barnett	1	Warren County	30821	
Barnett Shoals	1	Oconee County	30601	
Barney	1	Brooks County	31625	
Barneyville	1	Cook County		
Barnhill	1	Treutlen County		
Barnsley	1	Bartow County	30145	
Barr	1	Dougherty County		
Barretts	1	Lowndes County	31601	
Barretts Mill	1	Clarke County		
Barrettsville	1	Dawson County	30534	
Barrons Lane	1	Macon County		
Barrow Heights	1	Barrow County	30680	
Bartlett	1	Macon County		
Bartletts Ferry	1	Harris County	31808	
Bartonwoods	1	DeKalb County	30307	
Bartow	1	Bartow County		
Bartow	1	Jefferson County	30413	
Barwick	2	Brooks County	31720	
Barwick	2	Thomas County	31720	
Bascom	1	Screven County	30467	
Bass Crossroads	1	Troup County	30230	
Bastonville	1	Glascock County		
Batesville	1	Cherokee County		
Batesville	1	Habersham County	30523	
Bath	1	Richmond County	30805	
Battery Point	1	Chatham County	31404	
Battle Hill Haven	1	Fulton County		
Battle Park	1	Muscogee County	31905	
Baugh Mountain	1	GordonCounty	30746	
Baughs Crossroads	1	Troup County	31833	
Baughville	1	Talbot County		
Baxley	1	Appling County	31513	
Baxter	1	Union County	30572	
Bay	1	Colquitt County	31756	
Bayvale	1	Richmond County		
Bayview	1	Long County	31316	
Beach	1	Ware County	31554	
Beachton	1	Grady County	31792	
Beacon Heights	1	Morgan County	30650	
Beall	1	Talbot County		
Beall Springs	1	Warren County		
Beallwood	1	Muscogee County	31904	
Beards Creek	1	Long County		
Beasley Gap	1	Cherokee County		
Beatrice	1	Stewart County	31815	
Beatum	1	Chattooga County		
Beaulieu	1	Chatham County	31406	
Beaumount	1	Catoosa County		
Beaverdale	1	Whitfield County	30720	
Bedford Heights	1	Richmond County		
Bedingfield	1	Bibb County		
Beech Cove Vista	1	Towns County		
Beech Hill	1	Wilkinson County		
Beechwood	1	Taylor County		
Beechwood Hills	1	Clarke County	30601	
Belair	1	Richmond County	30907	
Belfast	1	Bryan County	31324	
Bell	1	Elbert County		
Bellcraft	1	Cobb County		
Bellemeade	1	Cobb County	30064	
Belleview	1	Talbot County		
Belle Vista	1	Glynn County		
Bellevue	1	Bibb County		
Bellton	2	Banks County	30554	
Bellton	2	Hall County	30554	
Bellview	1	Miller County		
Bellville	1	Clay County		
Bellville	1	Evans County	30414	
Bellville Bluff	1	McIntosh County	31331	
Bellville Point	1	McIntosh County		
Belmont	1	DeKalb County		
Belmont	1	Hall County	30501	
Beloit	1	Lee County		
Belt Junction	1	DeKalb County		
Belvedere	1	DeKalb County	30032	
Belvedere Park	1	DeKalb County	30032	
Belvedere Plaza	1	DeKalb County	30032	
Belvins Acres	1	Catoosa County	30736	
Bemiss	1	Lowndes County	31602	
Bender	1	Laurens County	31022	
Benedict	1	Glynn County		
Benedict	1	Polk County	30125	
Benefit	1	White County		
Benevolence	1	Randolph County	31740	
Ben Hill	1	Fulton County	31131	
Benning Hills	1	Muscogee County		
Benning Park	1	Muscogee County		
Bentley Place	1	Walker County	30741	
Benton	1	Floyd County	30161	
Berginville	1	Marion County		
Berkeley	1	Madison County		
Berkeley Lake	1	Gwinnett County	30136	
Berkshire Woods	1	Chatham County	31406	
Berlin	1	Colquitt County	31722	
Bermuda	1	Calhoun County		
Bermuda	1	DeKalb County		
Berner	1	Monroe County		
Berryton	1	Chattooga County	30748	
Berryville	1	Effingham County		
Berwin	1	Floyd County		
Berzelia	1	Columbia County	30814	
Bethany	1	Baker County	31762	
Bethany	1	Decatur County		
Bethel	1	Appling County		
Bethel	1	Clay County		
Bethel	1	Coffee County		
Bethel	1	Effingham County		
Bethel	1	Jasper County	31064	
Bethel	1	Randolph County	31740	
Bethel	1	Turner County		
Bethesda	1	Chatham County	31406	
Bethesda	1	Greene County		
Bethesda	1	Gwinnett County	30245	
Bethlehem	1	Barrow County	30620	
Bethlehem	1	Union County		
Betts	1	Meriwether County		
Between	1	Walton County	30655	
Beulah	1	Hancock County		
Beulah	2	Lincoln County	30632	
Beulah	2	Wilkes County	30632	
Beulah	1	Paulding County	30153	
Beulah Heights	1	Fulton County		
Beverly	1	Elbert County		
Beverly Heights	1	Muscogee County	31820	
Beverly Hills	1	Walker County	30741	
Bexton	1	Coweta County	30259	
Bibb City	1	Muscogee County	31904	
Bibb Mills	1	Monroe County	31029	
Bickley	1	Ware County	31554	
Big Canoe	2	Dawson County	30143	
Big Canoe	2	Pickens County	30143	
Big Creek	1	Forsyth County	30130	
Big Creek	1	Gilmer County		
Big Oak	1	Brantley County		
Big Springs	1	Troup County	30240	
Billarp	1	Douglas County	30187	
Bill Davis	1	Burke County	30456	
Billyville	1	Camden County		
Bingville	1	Chatham County	31405	
Birdie	1	Spalding County	30223	
Birds	1	Effingham County		
Birdsong Crossroads	1	Upson County		
Birdsville	1	Jenkins County	30442	
Birmingham	1	Fulton County	30201	
Bishop	1	Oconee County	30621	
Biss	1	Peach County		
Blackjack	1	Coweta County	30276	
Blackshear	1	Pierce County	31516	
Blackshear Place	1	Hall County	30501	
Blacksville	1	Henry County	30253	
Blackville	1	Treutlen County		
Blackwell	1	Cobb County		
Blackwell	1	Jasper County		
Blackwells	1	Cobb County	30060	
Blackwood	1	Gordon County	30701	
Bladen	1	Glynn County		
Blaine	1	Pickens County	30175	
Blairsville	1	Union County	30512	
Blair Village	1	Fulton County	30354	
Blakely	1	Early County	31723	
Blalock	1	Rabun County		
Bland	1	Bulloch County		
Blandford	1	Effingham County	31326	
Bland Villa	1	Crisp County	31015	
Blandy	1	Baldwin County		
Blanton	1	Lowndes County		
Blantons Mill	1	Spalding County		
Blaylock Mill	1	Walker County		
Blevins Acre	1	Catoosa County		
Blitch	1	Bulloch County	30458	
Blitchton	1	Bryan County	31308	
Bloodtown	1	Murray County		
Bloomfield Gardens	1	Bibb County		
Bloomingdale	1	Chatham County	31302	
Blount	1	Monroe County		
Blountsville	1	Jones County		
Blowing Spring	1	Walker County	37409	
Blue Ridge	1	Fannin County	30513	
Blue Spring	1	Catoosa County		
Blue Springs	1	Brooks County		
Blue Springs	1	Screven County		
Bluffton	1	Clay County	31724	
Blun	1	Emanuel County	30401	
Blundale	1	Emanuel County	30401	
Blythe	2	Burke County	30805	
Blythe	2	Richmond County	30805	
Bobo	1	Gordon County		
Bogart	2	Clarke County	30622	
Bogart	2	Oconee County	30622	
Boggy	1	Charlton County		
Bohanon Crossroad	1	Coweta County		
Bold Spring	1	Walton County	30655	
Bolen	1	Ware County		
Bolingbroke	1	Monroe County	31004	
Bolivar	1	Bartow County		
Bolton	1	Fulton County	30318	
Bona Bella	1	Chatham County	31406	
Bonair	1	Richmond County		
Bonaire	1	Houston County	31005	
Bonanza	1	Clayton County		
Bond	1	Madison County		
Bonds	1	Twiggs County	31020	
Bone	1	Floyd County		
Boneville	1	McDuffie County	30806	
Bonneyman	1	Pierce County		
Booker Washington Heights	1	Muscogee County		
Boozeville	1	Floyd County	30147	
Boston	1	Thomas County	31626	
Bostwick	1	Morgan County	30623	
Bottsford	1	Sumter County		
Bowden Hills	1	Bibb County		
Bowdon	1	Carroll County	30108	
Bowdon Junction	1	Carroll County	30109	
Bowen Mill	1	Bulloch County		
Bowens Mill	1	Ben Hill County		
Bower	1	Decatur County		
Bowersville	1	Hart County	30516	
Bowles Place	1	Richmond County		
Bowman	1	Elbert County	30624	
Box Ankle	1	Monroe County		
Box Springs	1	Talbot County	31801	
Boyd Highlands	1	Catoosa County	30736	
Boydville	1	Grady County		
Boydville	1	Stephens County	30577	
Boykin	1	Miller County	31737	
Boynton	1	Catoosa County	30736	
Boys Estate	1	Glynn County	31520	
Bradley	1	Jones County	31032	
Braganza	1	Ware County		
Bragg	1	Jones County		
Branchville	1	Mitchell County	31730	
Brantley	1	Marion County	31803	
Braselton	4	Barrow County	30517	
Braselton	4	Gwinnett County	30517	
Braselton	4	Jackson County	30517	
Braselton	4	Hall County	30517	
Braswell	1	Morgan County		
Braswell	2	Paulding County	30153	
Braswell	2	Polk County	30153	
Bremen	2	Carroll County	30110	
Bremen	2	Haralson County	30110	
Brent	1	Monroe County		
Brentwood	1	Dougherty County	31701	
Brentwood	1	Wayne County		
Brest	1	Mitchell County	31716	
Brewton	1	Laurens County	31021	
Briarcliff	1	DeKalb County	30329	
Briarwood	1	Fulton County	30344	
Briar Wood Estates	1	Cobb County	30060	
Brice	1	Floyd County		
Brickston	1	McIntosh County		
Brick Store	1	Newton County	30279	
Bridgeboro	1	Worth County	31705	
Bridgeman Heights	1	Bibb County	31201	
Bridges Crossroad	1	Terrell County		
Bridgetown	1	Coffee County		
Brier Creek Landing	1	Screven County		
Briggston	1	Lowndes County		
Bright	1	Dawson County		
Brighton	1	Tift County	31794	
Brinson	1	Decatur County	31725	
Brisbon	1	Bryan County	31324	
Bristol	1	Pierce County	31518	
Bristol Woods	1	Richmond County		
Broad	1	Wilkes County	30668	
Broadfield	1	Glynn County		
Broadhurst	1	Wayne County	31545	
Broadview	1	Fulton County	30324	
Brobston	1	Glynn County		
Brockton	1	Jackson County	30549	
Bronco	1	Walker County	30728	
Bronwood	1	Terrell County	31726	
Brooker	1	Jeff Davis County		
Brookfield	1	Tift County	31727	
Brookhaven	1	Bibb County	31119	
Brookhaven	1	DeKalb County		
Brookhaven	1	Muscogee County		
Brooklet	1	Bulloch County	30415	
Brooklyn	1	Stewart County	31825	
Brookman	1	Glynn County		
Brooks	1	Fayette County	30205	
Brooks	1	Wilkinson County		
Brooks Crossing	1	Clarke County	30601	
Brook Springs	1	Washington County		
Brooksville	1	Randolph County	31721	
Brookton	1	Hall County	30501	
Brookvale Estates	1	Catoosa County	30736	
Brookwood	1	DeKalb County		
Brookwood	1	Forsyth County	30201	
Brookwood	1	Fulton County		
Brookwood	1	Laurens County	31021	
Brookwood Apartments	1	Bibb County		
Broughton	1	Jasper County		
Browndale	1	Pulaski County	31036	
Brown Ford	1	Echols County		
Browning	1	Wilcox County		
Brownlee	1	Grady County		
Brown Mill	1	Fannin County		
Browns	1	Baldwin County	31061	
Browns	1	Dade County		
Brownsand	1	Talbot County		
Browns Crossing	1	Baldwin County	31061	
Brownsville	1	Paulding County		
Browntown	1	Brantley County		
Brownwood	1	Morgan County	30650	
Broxton	1	Coffee County	31519	
Brumby	1	Walker County		
Brunswick	1	Glynn County	31520	
Bryan Mill	1	Fannin County		
Bryant	1	Dodge County		
Bry-Man Seven Cities Plaza	1	Whitfield County	30720	
Buchanan	1	Haralson County	30113	
Buckhead	1	Chatham County		
Buckhead	1	Fulton County		
Buckhead	1	Morgan County	30625	
Buckhorn Tavern	1	Lumpkin County		
Budapest	1	Haralson County	30176	
Buena Vista	1	Marion County	31803	
Buffington	1	Cherokee County	30114	
Buford	2	Gwinnett County	30518	
Buford	2	Hall County	30518	
Bullard	1	Twiggs County	31020	
Bullhead Bluff	1	Camden County		
Bulloch Crossroads	1	Meriwether County	31816	
Bumphead	1	Schley County		
Bunker Hill	1	Union County	30512	
Burnett	1	Gilmer County		
Burnett	1	Wayne County		
Burney Hill	1	Cook County		
Burning Bush	1	Catoosa County	30736	
Burnside	1	Chatham County		
Burnside Island	1	Chatham County	31406	
Burnt Fort	1	Camden County		
Burrells Ford	1	Rabun County		
Burris Crossroads	1	Cherokee County		
Burroughs	1	Chatham County	31405	
Burtons Ferry Landing	1	Screven County		
Burtsboro	1	Lumpkin County		
Burwell	1	Carroll County	30117	
Bush Field	1	Richmond County	30906	
Bushnell	1	Coffee County	31533	
Bussey Crossroads	1	Meriwether County	31830	
Butler	1	Taylor County	31006	
Butler Subdivision	1	Dougherty County	31701	
Butts	1	Jenkins County	30442	
Byers Crossroads	1	Carroll County	30185	
Byne Crossroads	1	Lee County		
Byromville	1	Dooly County	31007	
Byron	2	Peach County	31008	
Byron	2	Houston County	31008	
Cabaniss	1	Monroe County	31029	
Cabin Bluff	1	Camden County		
Cadley	1	Warren County	30821	
Cadwell	1	Laurens County	31009	
Cagle	1	Pickens County	30143	
Cairo	1	Grady County	31728	
Caleb	1	Gwinnett County	30058	
Calhoun	1	Gordon County	30701	
Callaway Mill	1	Whitfield County		
Calvary	1	Grady County	31729	
Calvin	1	Jasper County		
Camak	1	Warren County	30807	
Camelot	1	Clarke County	30601	
Camelot	1	Clayton County	30236	
Cameron	1	Screven County		
Camilla	1	Mitchell County	31730	
Campania	1	Columbia County	30814	
Campbellton	1	Fulton County	30213	
Camp Stewart	5	Bryan County		
Camp Stewart	5	Evans County		
Camp Stewart	5	Liberty County		
Camp Stewart	5	Long County		
Camp Stewart	5	Tattnall County		
Camp Toccoa	1	Stephens County		
Campton	1	Walton County	30626	
Campus	1	Clarke County	30605	
Canal Lake	1	Union County	30512	
Candler	1	Hall County	30501	
Candler-McAfee	1	DeKalb County	30032	
Cane Creek	1	Lumpkin County		
Cannon Gate	1	Columbia County	30907	
Cannonville	1	Troup County	30240	
Canon	2	Franklin County	30520	
Canon	2	Hart County	30520	
Canoochee	1	Emanuel County	30471	
Canton	1	Cherokee County	30114	
Canton Plaza	1	Cobb County	30066	
Capel	1	Grady County	31728	
Capitol Hill	1	Fulton County	30334	
Captolo	1	Screven County	30467	
Carbondale	1	Whitfield County	30720	
Carey	1	Greene County		
Carey Park	1	Fulton County		
Carl	1	Barrow County	30203	
Carlan	1	Banks County		
Carlton	1	Madison County	30627	
Carmel	1	Meriwether County	30218	
Carmichael Crossroads	1	Cherokee County	30114	
Carnegie	1	Randolph County	31740	
Carnes Creek	1	Stephens County	30577	
Carnesville	1	Franklin County	30521	
Carnigan	1	McIntosh County	31319	
Carns Mill	1	Pickens County	30175	
Caroline Park	1	Muscogee County		
Carrolls	1	Meriwether County		
Carrollton	1	Carroll County	30117	
Carrs	1	Hancock County	31087	
Carsonville	1	Taylor County	31827	
Cartecay	1	Gilmer County	30540	
Carter Acres	1	Muscogee County		
Carters	1	Murray County	30705	
Carters Grove	1	Taliaferro County	30660	
Cartersville	1	Bartow County	30120	
Caruso	1	Spalding County		
Caruthers Mill	1	Walton County		
Carver Village	1	Chatham County		
Cary	1	Bleckley County	31014	
Cascade Heights	1	Fulton County	30311	
Cascade Hills	1	Muscogee County		
Caseyville	1	Polk County		
Cash	1	Gordon County	30701	
Cass	1	Bartow County	30120	
Cassandra	1	Walker County	30707	
Cassville	1	Bartow County	30123	
Castle Park	1	Lowndes County	31601	
Cataula	1	Harris County	31804	
Catlett	1	Walker County	30728	
Catlin	1	Laurens County		
Cave Spring	1	Floyd County	30124	
Cecil	1	Cook County	31627	
Cedar Cliff	1	Towns County		
Cedar Creek Park	1	Clarke County	30601	
Cedar Crossing	1	Toombs County	30436	
Cedar Grove	1	Chatham County	31406	
Cedar Grove	1	DeKalb County	30049	
Cedar Grove	1	Fulton County	30213	
Cedar Grove	1	Laurens County		
Cedar Grove	1	Walker County	30707	
Cedar Hammock	1	Chatham County	31406	
Cedarpark	1	Telfair County		
Cedar Point	1	McIntosh County	31332	
Cedar Rock	1	Warren County		
Cedar Springs	1	Early County	31732	
Cedartown	1	Polk County	30125	
Cedar Valley	1	Whitfield County		
Celanese Village	1	Floyd County		
Celeste	1	Wilkes County	30673	
Cenchat	1	Walker County		
Centaur	1	Bibb County		
Centennial	1	Morgan County	30663	
Center	1	Bartow County	30120	
Center	1	Jackson County	30601	
Center	1	Toombs County	30474	
Center Hill	1	Colquitt County		
Center Hill	1	Fulton County		
Center Point	1	Carroll County	30179	
Centerpoint	1	Webster County		
Center Post	1	Walker County	30728	
Centerville	1	DeKalb County	30058	
Centerville	1	Early County		
Centerville	1	Elbert County	30635	
Centerville	1	Gwinnett County	30058	
Centerville	1	Houston County	31028	
Centerville	1	Talbot County	31812	
Centerville	1	Wilkes County		
Central City	1	Fulton County	30303	
Centralhatchee	1	Heard County	30217	
Central Junction	1	Chatham County	31401	
Central State Hospital	1	Baldwin County		
Century	1	Lee County	31763	
Ceylon	1	Camden County		
Chalybeate Springs	1	Meriwether County	31816	
Chamberlain	1	Walker County	30728	
Chamblee	1	DeKalb County	30341	
Chamblis Mill	1	Sumter County		
Chambliss	1	Sumter County	31709	
Chambliss	1	Terrell County		
Champion Crossroad	1	Harris County		
Chapel Hill	1	Douglas County	30134	
Chappel	1	Lamar County	30257	
Chappells Mill	1	Laurens County		
Charing	1	Taylor County	31058	
Charles	1	Stewart County	31815	
Charles	1	Toombs County	30474	
Charlie Brown/Fulton County Airport	1	Fulton County		
Charlotteville	1	Montgomery County	30473	
Chaserville	1	Cook County		
Chastain	1	Thomas County	31738	
Chatham City	1	Chatham County	31408	
Chatham Villas	1	Chatham County	31408	
Chatsworth	1	Murray County	30705	
Chattahoochee	1	Fulton County		
Chattahoochee Plantation	1	Cobb County	30060	
Chattahoochee River National Recreation Area	5	Cobb County	30080	
Chattahoochee River National Recreation Area	5	DeKalb County	30080	
Chattahoochee River National Recreation Area	5	Forsyth County	30080	
Chattahoochee River National Recreation Area	5	Fulton County	30080	
Chattahoochee River National Recreation Area	5	Gwinnett County	30080	
Chattanooga Valley	1	Walker County		
Chatterton	1	Coffee County	31554	
Chattoogaville	1	Chattooga County	30730	
Chauncey	1	Dodge County	31011	
Checkero	1	Rabun County	30525	
Chehaw	1	Lee County		
Chelsea	1	Chattooga County	30731	
Chennault	1	Lincoln County	30632	
Cherokee	1	Bibb County		
Cherokee Heights	1	Bibb County		
Cherrying	1	Gilmer County		
Cherry Log	1	Gilmer County	30522	
Cheshire Bridge	1	Fulton County	30324	
Chestatee	1	Forsyth County	30130	
Chester	1	Dodge County	31012	
Chestnutflat	1	Walker County	30728	
Chestnut Gap	1	Fannin County		
Chestnut Mountain	1	Hall County	30502	
Chickamauga	1	Walker County	30707	
Chickamauga and Chattanooga NMP	3	Catoosa County	30742	
Chickamauga and Chattanooga NMP	3	Dade County	30742	
Chickamauga and Chattanooga NMP	3	Walker County	30742	
Chickasawhatchee	1	Terrell County	31742	
Chicopee	1	Hall County	30501	
China Hill	1	Telfair County	31077	
Chipley	1	Harris County		
Chippewa Terrace	1	Chatham County	31406	
Choestoe	1	Union County	30512	
Chokee	1	Lee County		
Chopped Oak	1	Gilmer County		
Christopher	1	Chattahoochee County		
Chubbtown	1	Floyd County	30124	
Chula	1	Tift County	31733	
Church Hill	1	Marion County		
Cinderella Hills	1	Catoosa County	30736	
Cisco	1	Murray County	30708	
City Village	1	Muscogee County		
Civic Center	1	Fulton County	30308	
Clarkdale	1	Cobb County	30020	
Clarke Dale	1	Clarke County	30601	
Clarkesville	1	Habersham County	30523	
Clarking	1	Charlton County		
Clarks Bluff	1	Camden County		
Clarksboro	1	Jackson County	30601	
Clarks Mill	1	Terrell County		
Clarkston	1	DeKalb County	30021	
Clarkesville	1	Habersham County	30523	
Claxton	1	Evans County	30417	
Clayfields	1	Wilkinson County	31054	
Clay Hill	1	Lincoln County		
Clayton	1	Rabun County	30525	
Clearview	1	Chatham County		
Clearview	1	Macon County		
Clearwater Springs	1	Pike County		
Cleaton	1	Walton County		
Clem	1	Carroll County	30117	
Cleola	1	Harris County		
Clermont	1	Hall County	30527	
Cleveland	1	White County	30528	
Cleveland Station	1	Clarke County		
Cliftondale	1	Fulton County	30337	
Climax	1	Decatur County	31734	
Clinchfield	1	Houston County	31013	
Clinton	1	Jones County	31032	
Clito	1	Bulloch County		
Clopine	1	Peach County		
Cloudland	1	Chattooga County	30731	
Clover	1	Fayette County		
Cloverdale	1	Dade County	30738	
Clubview Heights	1	Muscogee County		
Clyattville	1	Lowndes County	31601	
Clyo	1	Effingham County	31303	
Coal Mountain	1	Forsyth County	30130	
Cobb	1	Sumter County	31735	
Cobb County Center	1	Cobb County	30080	
Cobbham	1	McDuffie County		
Cobbham Crossroads	1	McDuffie County		
Cobbtown	1	Tattnall County	30420	
Cobbville	1	Telfair County	31055	
Cochran	1	Bleckley County	31014	
Cochran Field	1	Bibb County		
Coffee	1	Bacon County	31551	
Coffee Bluff	1	Chatham County	31406	
Coffinton	1	Stewart County		
Cogdell	1	Clinch County	31634	
Cohentown	1	Wilkes County		
Cohutta	1	Whitfield County	30710	
Cohutta Springs	1	Murray County	30711	
Colbert	1	Madison County	30628	
Coldbrook	1	Effingham County		
Cole City	1	Dade County		
Coleman	1	Randolph County	31736	
Colemans Lake	1	Emanuel County	30441	
Colerain	1	Camden County		
Colesburg	1	Camden County	31569	
Coley	1	Bleckley County		
Colfax	1	Bulloch County	30458	
Colima	1	Gordon County		
Collegeboro	1	Bulloch County		
College Heights	1	Dougherty County	31701	
College Heights	1	Muscogee County		
College Park	2	Clayton County	30337	
College Park	2	Fulton County	30337	
Colliers	1	Monroe County		
Collins	1	Tattnall County	30421	
Collinsville	1	DeKalb County		
Colomokee	1	Early County	31723	
Colon	1	Clinch County		
Colonial Oaks	1	Chatham County	31406	
Colonial Place	1	Dougherty County	31705	
Colony Farm Correctional Institute	1	Baldwin County		
Colquitt	1	Miller County	31737	
Colson Store	1	Habersham County	30535	
Columbia Heights	1	Columbia County	30907	
Columbus	1	Muscogee County	31901	99
Columbus Airport	1	Muscogee County	31904	
Colwell	1	Fannin County	30541	
Comer	1	Madison County	30629	
Commerce	1	Jackson County	30529	
Commissary Hill	1	Calhoun County		
Comolli	1	Elbert County	30635	
Concord	1	Pike County	30206	
Concord	1	Schley County	31806	
Concord	1	Sumter County		
Condor	1	Laurens County		
Coney	1	Crisp County	31015	
Coniston	1	Murray County		
Conley	1	Clayton County	30027	
Constitution	1	DeKalb County	30316	
Conyers	1	Rockdale County	30207	08
Cooksville	1	Heard County	30230	
Cooktown	1	Miller County		
Cooktown	1	Wilkinson County		
Coolidge	1	Thomas County	31738	
Cool Spring	1	Colquitt County	31771	
Cooper Creek	1	Fannin County		
Cooper Creek Park	1	Muscogee County		
Cooper Heights	1	Walker County	30707	
Coopers	1	Baldwin County	31031	
Cooperville	1	Screven County		
Coosa	1	Floyd County	30129	
Copeland	1	Dodge County	31077	
Copeland Crossing	1	Catoosa County		
Cora	1	Newton County		
Corbin	1	Bartow County		
Cordele	1	Crisp County	31015	
Cordrays Mill	1	Calhoun County		
Corea	1	Miller County		
Corinth	2	Coweta County	30230	
Corinth	2	Heard County	30230	
Cork	1	Butts County		
Cornelia	1	Habersham County	30531	
Cornell	1	Fulton County		
Cottle	1	Berrien County		
Cotton	1	Mitchell County	31739	
Cotton Hill	1	Clay County	31767	
Cottons Crossroads	1	Troup County		
Council	1	Clinch County	31631	
Country Club Estates	1	Glynn County		
Country Club Hills	1	Richmond County		
Country Side	1	Chatham County		
County Line	1	Barrow County	30680	
County Line	1	Stewart County	31815	
County Prison Spur	1	Brooks County		
Court Square	1	Laurens County	31021	
Covena	1	Emanuel County	30422	
Coverdale	1	Turner County	31714	
Covington	1	Newton County	30209	
Covington Mills	1	Newton County	30209	
Cox	1	McIntosh County	31331	
Coxs Crossing	1	Clayton County	30070	
Crabapple	1	Fulton County	30201	
Crandall	1	Murray County	30711	
Crane Eater	1	Gordon County	30701	
Cravey	1	Telfair County	31060	
Crawford	1	Oglethorpe County	30630	
Crawfordville	1	Taliaferro County	30631	
Crawley	1	Ware County		
Credit Hill	1	McIntosh County		
Creek Island	1	Liberty County		
Crescent	1	McIntosh County	31304	
Crest	1	Upson County	30286	
Crest Hill Gardens	1	Chatham County	31406	
Crestview	1	Baker County	31713	
Crestwell Heights	1	Bibb County	31204	
Crestwood	1	Worth County		
Cromers	1	Franklin County	30662	
Crosland	1	Colquitt County	31771	
Cross Keys	1	Bibb County	31201	
Cross Plains	1	Carroll County		
Crossroads	1	Bartow County		
Crossroads	1	Early County		
Crossroads	1	Hart County	30516	
Crossroads	1	Liberty County	31323	
Cross Roads	1	Paulding County		
Crossroads	1	Quitman County		
Crowders Crossing	1	Meriwether County	31830	
Crowville	1	Paulding County		
Croxton Crossroads	1	Sumter County		
Cruse	1	Gwinnett County	30136	
Crystal Springs	1	Bibb County	31201	
Crystal Springs	1	Floyd County	30105	
Crystal Valley	1	Muscogee County		
Cuba	1	Early County		
Cuffietown	1	Worth County		
Culloden	1	Monroe County	31016	
Culverton	1	Hancock County	31087	
Cumberland	1	Cobb County	30339	
Cumberland Island National Seashore	1	Camden County	31558	
Cumming	1	Forsyth County	30130	
Cumslo	1	Jones County		
Cunningham	1	Floyd County		
Cunningham Crossroads	1	Talbot County		
Curry Hill	1	Lincoln County		
Curryville	1	Gordon County	30701	
Curtis	1	Fannin County	30513	
Cusseta	1	Chattahoochee County	31805	
Custer Road Terrace	1	Muscogee County		
Custer Terrace	1	Muscogee County	31905	
Cutcane	1	Fannin County		
Cuthbert	1	Randolph County	31740	
Cutoff	1	Macon County		
Cutting	1	Clinch County		
Cypress Mills	1	Glynn County	31520	
Cypress Siding	1	Charlton County		
Cyrene	1	Decatur County		
Dacula	1	Gwinnett County	30211	
Daffin Heights	1	Chatham County		
Dahlonega	1	Lumpkin County	30533	
Daisy	1	Evans County	30423	
Dakota	1	Turner County	31714	
Dallas	1	Paulding County	30132	
Dallondale	1	Catoosa County	30741	
Dalton	1	Whitfield County	30720	
Damascus	1	Early County	31741	
Damascus	1	Gordon County	30701	
Dames Ferry	1	Monroe County	31046	
Dan	1	Richmond County		
Danburg	1	Wilkes County	30668	
Daniel	1	Bryan County	31324	
Daniels	1	Evans County		
Daniel Springs	1	Greene County	30669	
Danielsville	1	Madison County	30633	
Danville	2	Twiggs County	31017	
Danville	2	Wilkinson County	31017	
Darien	1	McIntosh County	31305	
Dasher	1	Lowndes County	31601	
David	1	Glascock County	30823	
Davis	1	Appling County		
Davisboro	1	Washington County	31018	
Davis Crossroads	1	Cobb County		
Davis Crossroads	1	Walker County	30707	
Davis Mill	1	Worth County		
Dawesville	1	Thomas County	31792	
Dawnville	1	Whitfield County	30720	
Dawson	1	Terrell County	31742	
Dawsonville	1	Dawson County	30534	
Days Crossroads	1	Clay County	31751	
Dearing	1	McDuffie County	30808	
De Bruce	1	Richmond County		
Decatur	1	DeKalb County	30030	39
Dedrich	1	Wilkinson County		
Deenwood	1	Ware County	31501	
Deepstep	1	Washington County	31082	
Deercourt	1	Stephens County		
Deerland	1	DeKalb County		
Deerwood Park	1	DeKalb County	30032	
DeKalb-Peachtree Airport	1	DeKalb County		
Delhi	1	Wilkes County	30668	
Dellwood	1	Emanuel County	30401	
Delmar	1	Lowndes County		
Delowe	1	Fulton County	30344	
Delray	1	Upson County		
Demorest	1	Habersham County	30535	
Denmark	1	Bulloch County	30415	
Dennis	1	Murray County		
Dennis	1	Putnam County	31024	
Denton	1	Jeff Davis County	31532	
Denver	1	Heard County	30217	
Deptford	1	Chatham County		
De Soto	1	Sumter County	31743	
De Soto Park	1	Floyd County	30161	
Desser	1	Seminole County	31745	
Devereux	1	Hancock County	31087	
Dewberry	1	Hall County	30501	
Dewberry	1	Walker County	30741	
Dewey Crossroads	1	Bartow County	30184	
Dewey Rose	1	Elbert County		
DeWitt	1	Mitchell County		
Dewy Rose	1	Elbert County	30634	
Dexter	1	Laurens County	31019	
Dial	1	Fannin County	30513	
Dialtown	1	Newton County	30267	
Diamond	1	Gilmer County		
Diamond Hill	1	Madison County	30628	
Dickerson Mill	1	Rabun County		
Dickey	1	Calhoun County	31746	
Dickey	1	Walker County		
Dicks Hill	1	Habersham County	30563	
Dickson	1	Morgan County		
Digbey	1	Spalding County	30205	
Dillard	1	Rabun County	30537	
Dillon	1	Thomas County	31792	
Dingler Crossroads	1	Carroll County		
Dinglewood	1	Muscogee County		
District Path	1	Twiggs County		
Divide	1	Paulding County		
Dixie	1	Brooks County	31629	
Dixie	1	Newton County	30209	
Dixie Heights	1	Dougherty County		
Dixie Union	1	Ware County	31501	
Dixon Crossroads	1	Habersham County		
Dobbins Air Force Base	1	Cobb County	30060	
Dock Junction	1	Glynn County	31520	
Doctortown	1	Wayne County	31545	
Dodge High	1	Dodge County		
Doerun	1	Colquitt County	31744	
Doles	1	Worth County	31791	
Donald	1	Long County	31316	
Donalsonville	1	Seminole County	31745	
Donegal	1	Bulloch County	30458	
Donovan	1	Johnson County	31096	
Doogan	1	Murray County	30708	
Dooling	1	Dooly County	31063	
Doraland	1	Decatur County		
Doraville	1	DeKalb County	30340	
Dorchester	1	Liberty County	31317	
Dorsey	1	Morgan County	30650	
Dosaga	1	Dougherty County		
Dosia	1	Tift County	31794	
Dot	1	Carroll County	30108	
Double Branches	1	Lincoln County	30817	
Doublegate	1	Dougherty County	31701	
Double Run	1	Wilcox County	31072	
Dougherty	1	Dawson County	30534	
Dougherty	1	Dougherty County		
Dougherty Junction	1	Dougherty County		
Douglas	1	Coffee County	31533	
Douglass Crossroads	1	Early County		
Douglasville	1	Douglas County	30133	35
Douglasville	1	Early County		
Dove Creek	1	Elbert County	30635	
Dover	1	Screven County	30424	
Dover Bluff	1	Camden County		
Doverel	1	Terrell County	31742	
Downs	1	Washington County		
Downtown	1	Fulton County	30301	
Downtown	1	Muscogee County	31901	
Doyle	1	Marion County	31803	
Draketown	1	Haralson County	30179	
Draneville	1	Marion County	31803	
Drayton	1	Dooly County	31092	
Dresden	1	Coweta County	30263	
Drew	1	Forsyth County	30130	
Drexel	1	Morgan County	30663	
Drone	1	Burke County		
Druid Hills	1	DeKalb County	30333	
Dry Branch	2	Bibb County	31020	
Dry Branch	2	Twiggs County	31020	
Dry Branch	1	Jenkins County	30822	
Dry Pond	1	Jackson County	30529	
Dublin	1	Laurens County	31021	
Dubois	1	Dodge County	31026	
Ducker	1	Dougherty County		
Ducktown	1	Forsyth County	30130	
Dudley	1	Laurens County	31022	
Due West	1	Cobb County	30060	
Duffee	1	Mitchell County	31730	
Dugdown	1	Haralson County	30140	
Duluth	1	Gwinnett County	30136	
Dumas	1	Webster County	31824	
Dunaire	1	DeKalb County	30032	
Dunaway Gardens	1	Coweta County		
Duncan Park	1	Catoosa County	30741	
Dungeness	1	Camden County		
Dunlap	1	Oglethorpe County		
Dunn	1	Fannin County		
Dunn Store	1	Murray County	30711	
Dunwoody	1	DeKalb County	30338	
Du Pont	1	Clinch County	31630	
Durand	1	Meriwether County	31830	
Durden	1	Brooks County		
Durdenville	1	Emanuel County		
Durham	1	Walker County		
Durham Town	1	Greene County		
Dyas	1	Monroe County		
Dye	1	Elbert County	30624	
Dyes Crossroad	1	Burke County		
Dyke	1	Gilmer County	30540	

== See also ==
- Georgia (U.S. state)
- List of counties in Georgia (U.S. state)
- List of municipalities in Georgia (U.S. state)
