= Chelsea =

Chelsea most commonly refers to:

- Chelsea, London, an area of London, bounded to the south by the River Thames
- Chelsea F.C., a Premier League association football club in London, England
- Chelsea (given name), a given name and list of people with the name Chelsea, Chelsey or variants thereof

Chelsea or Chelsey may also refer to:

== Places ==
=== Australia ===
- Chelsea, Victoria, a suburb
  - Chelsea railway station, Melbourne

=== Canada ===
- Chelsea, Nova Scotia, a community
- Chelsea, Quebec, a municipality

=== United Kingdom ===
- Chelsea, London, an area of London, bounded to the south by the River Thames
  - Chelsea (UK Parliament constituency), a former parliamentary constituency at Westminster until the 1997 redistribution
  - Chelsea (London County Council constituency), 1949–1965
  - King's Road Chelsea railway station, a proposed railway station
  - Metropolitan Borough of Chelsea, a former borough in London

=== United States ===
- Chelsea, Alabama, a city
- Chelsea (Delaware City, Delaware), a historic house
- Chelsea, Georgia, an unincorporated community
- Chelsea, Indiana, an unincorporated community
- Chelsea, Iowa, in Tama County
- Chelsea, Maine, a town
- Chelsea, Massachusetts, a city
  - Bellingham Square station, which includes a commuter rail stop called Chelsea
  - Chelsea station (MBTA), a bus rapid transit station in Chelsea
- Chelsea, Michigan, a city
- Chelsey Brook, a stream in Minnesota
- Chelsea, Jersey City, New Jersey, a neighborhood
- Chelsea, Dutchess County, New York, a hamlet
- Chelsea, Manhattan, New York City, a neighborhood
- Chelsea, Staten Island, New York City, a neighborhood
- Chelsea, Oklahoma, a town
- Chelsea, Pennsylvania, in Delaware County
- Chelsea, South Dakota, a town
- Chelsea, Vermont, a New England town
  - Chelsea (CDP), Vermont, the main village in the town
- Chelsea (West Point, Virginia), a historic house
- Chelsea, Wisconsin, a town
  - Chelsea (CDP), Wisconsin, community in the northeast corner of the town
- Chelsea Township, Butler County, Kansas
- Chelsea Township, Fillmore County, Nebraska, a township

== Arts and entertainment ==
=== Film and television ===
- Chelsea (film), a 2010 Ghanaian direct-to-video thriller film
- Chelsea (TV series), a US TV talk show starring Chelsea Handler

=== Music ===
==== Bands ====
- Chelsea (band), an English punk rock band, formed in London in 1976
- Chelsea, former Kiss drummer Peter Criss' first band

==== Albums ====
- Chelsea (album), debut album released in 1979

==== Songs ====
- "Chelsea" (song), 2006, by STEFY
- "(I Don't Want to Go to) Chelsea", a 1978 song by Elvis Costello from This Year's Model
- "Chelsea", a 2009 song by The Summer Set from Love Like This
- "Chelsea", a song by The Featherz from their 2017 album Five-Year-Itch
- "Chelsea", a song by Toto from their album Old Is New

=== Other uses in arts and entertainment ===
- Chelsea Cinema, former name of the Regal Theatre, Adelaide, South Australia

== Companies ==
- Chelsea Food Services, an airline catering company
- Chelsea Piers, a sports and entertainment complex in New York City, US
- Chelsea porcelain factory, a factory that was in London, England
- Chelsea Sugar Refinery, a factory in Birkenhead, New Zealand
- Hotel Chelsea, a hotel in New York City, US

== Organisations ==
- Chelsea Building Society, a UK building society
- Chelsea College of Arts, an art and design college in London, England
- Royal Hospital Chelsea, home for former soldiers in London, England

== Sports ==
- Bechem Chelsea, the former name of Berekum Chelsea F.C., a Ghanaian football club based in Bechem, Ghana
- Chelsea F.C., the former name of Glenfield Rovers, a New Zealand association football club based in North Shore City
- Chelsea Hajduk Soccer Club, the former name of Dandenong City SC, an association football club in Melbourne, Australia
- Chelsea F.C. Women, a women's association football club associated with Chelsea F.C.

== Other uses ==
- Chelsea (magazine), a small literary magazine founded in 1958 in New York City
- Chelsea (drink), a carbonated, low-alcohol beverage
- Chelsea Publishing, an imprint of the American Mathematical Society
- Chelsea Tower, a 250-metre skyscraper in Dubai, United Arab Emirates
- Chelsea boot, a boot with a distinct elastic side panel on the ankle
- Chelsea Flower Show, an annual garden show run by the RHS in the grounds of the Royal Hospital Chelsea

== See also ==
- Chelsea College (disambiguation)
- Chelsea Council (disambiguation)
- Chelsea and Fulham (UK Parliament constituency), a constituency at Westminster
- Chelsea Girl (disambiguation)
- Chelsea Heights (disambiguation)
- Chelsea High School (disambiguation)
- Chelsea Hotel (disambiguation)
- Chelsea railway station (disambiguation)
- Chelsea smile (disambiguation)
- Royal Borough of Kensington and Chelsea, a borough in London
- Chelsy (Japanese band), who formed in 2011 and disbanded in 2018
