= Antioch (disambiguation) =

Antioch on the Orontes (Syrian Antioch) was a Hellenistic city in the Seleucid, Roman, and Byzantine Empires, located near present-day Antakya in Turkey.

Antioch may also refer to:

== Places ==
=== Asia ===
Mentioned places named Antioch in Turkey
- Principality of Antioch, a Crusader state with its capital at Antioch on the Orontes
- Antioch, Pisidia, with a corresponding titular see.
- Antioch on the Maeander
- Antiochia ad Cragum, also known as Antiochetta, Antiochia Minor or Antiochoa Parva, in Isauria, later renamed Seleucia
- Antioch on the Cydnus, Tarsus, now in Turkey
- Antioch, Mygdonia, former name of Nisibis; in ancient Mesopotamia, now Nusaybin in Turkey
- Antiochia ad Sarum, now Adana in Turkey

=== United States ===
- Antioch, Covington County, Alabama
- Antioch, California, the largest city with the name
- Antioch, Florida
- Antioch, Harris County, Georgia
- Antioch, Polk County, Georgia
- Antioch, Troup County, Georgia
- Antioch, Illinois
- Antioch, Clinton County, Indiana
- Antioch, Jay County, Indiana
- Antioch, Harrison County, Kentucky
- Antioch, Claiborne Parish, Louisiana
- Antioch, Jackson Parish, Louisiana
- Antioch, Lincoln Parish, Louisiana
- Antioch Township, Michigan
- Antioch, Missouri
- Antioch, Nebraska
- Antioch, Ohio
- Antioch, Oklahoma
- Antioch, South Carolina
- Antioch, Tennessee
- Antioch, Texas (disambiguation)
- Antioch, Virginia
- Antioch, West Virginia

=== Other places ===
- Passage of Antioch, a strait on the western coast of France
- Antioquia, a department (province) of Colombia

== Education ==
- Antioch College, an independent college in Yellow Springs, Ohio
- Antioch University, a multi-campus university system, including
  - Antioch University Los Angeles, in Culver City, California
  - Antioch University McGregor, in Yellow Springs, Ohio

== Culture ==
- Antioch Peverell, a character in the Harry Potter series
- "Antioch", the tune attributed to George Frederick Handel generally used for the Christmas carol "Joy to the World"
- "Antioch (Interlude)", a song by Flobots from Noenemies
- "Antioch", a character in The Rock-afire Explosion animatronic band
- Holy Hand Grenade of Antioch, a holy weapon used to destroy the Rabbit of Caerbannog in the film the Monty Python and the Holy Grail

== People ==
- Ignatius of Antioch, a first-century bishop

== Transportation ==
- Antioch, California, United States
  - Antioch–Pittsburg station, Amtrak station
  - Antioch station (eBART), eBART station
- Antioch station (Illinois), Metra station in Antioch, Illinois, United States

== See also ==
- Antiochia (disambiguation)
