= Antioch, Texas =

Antioch, Texas may refer to:

- Antioch, Brown County, Texas
- Antioch, Cass County, Texas
- Antioch, Delta County, Texas
- Antioch, Freestone County, Texas
- Antioch, Henderson County, Texas
- Antioch, Houston County, Texas
- Antioch, Johnson County, Texas
- Antioch, Lee County, Texas
- Antioch, Madison County, Texas
- Antioch, Panola County, Texas
- Antioch, Shelby County, Texas
- Antioch, Smith County, Texas
- Antioch, Stonewall County, Texas
- Antioch, Trinity County, Texas
- Antioch Colony, Texas
