= Chastain =

Chastain may refer to:

- Chastain (surname)
- Chastain, Georgia, a community in the United States
- Chastain Park, located in the Atlanta, Georgia area
- Chastain Peak, Thiel Mountains, Antarctica
- Chastain (band), an American heavy metal band
- Chastain Motorsports, team in Indy Racing League
- Chastain Park Memorial Hospital, fictional setting of Fox TV series The Resident (TV series)
