= Berner =

Berner is a surname. Notable people with the surname include:

- Berner (rapper), San Francisco rapper
- Alexander Berner (born 1901, date of death unknown), Swiss skeleton racer who competed in the late 1920s
- Anne Berner (born 1964), Finnish-Swish business executive and the former Minister of Transport and Communications of Finland
- Boel Berner (b. 1945), Swedish sociologist, historian, and editor
- Bruno Berner (born 1977), former Swiss footballer
- Carl Berner (disambiguation), various people
- Friedrich Wilhelm Berner (1780–1827), German organist and composer
- Geoff Berner (born 1971), Canadian musician and writer
- Örjan Berner (born 1937), Swedish diplomat
- Peter Berner, Australian comedian, presenter, and artist
- Robert Berner (1935–2015), American scientist
- Sara Berner (1912–1969), American actress
- Vicki Berner (1945–2017), Canadian tennis player

== See also ==
- Berner, Georgia
