= U.S. state and territory temperature extremes =

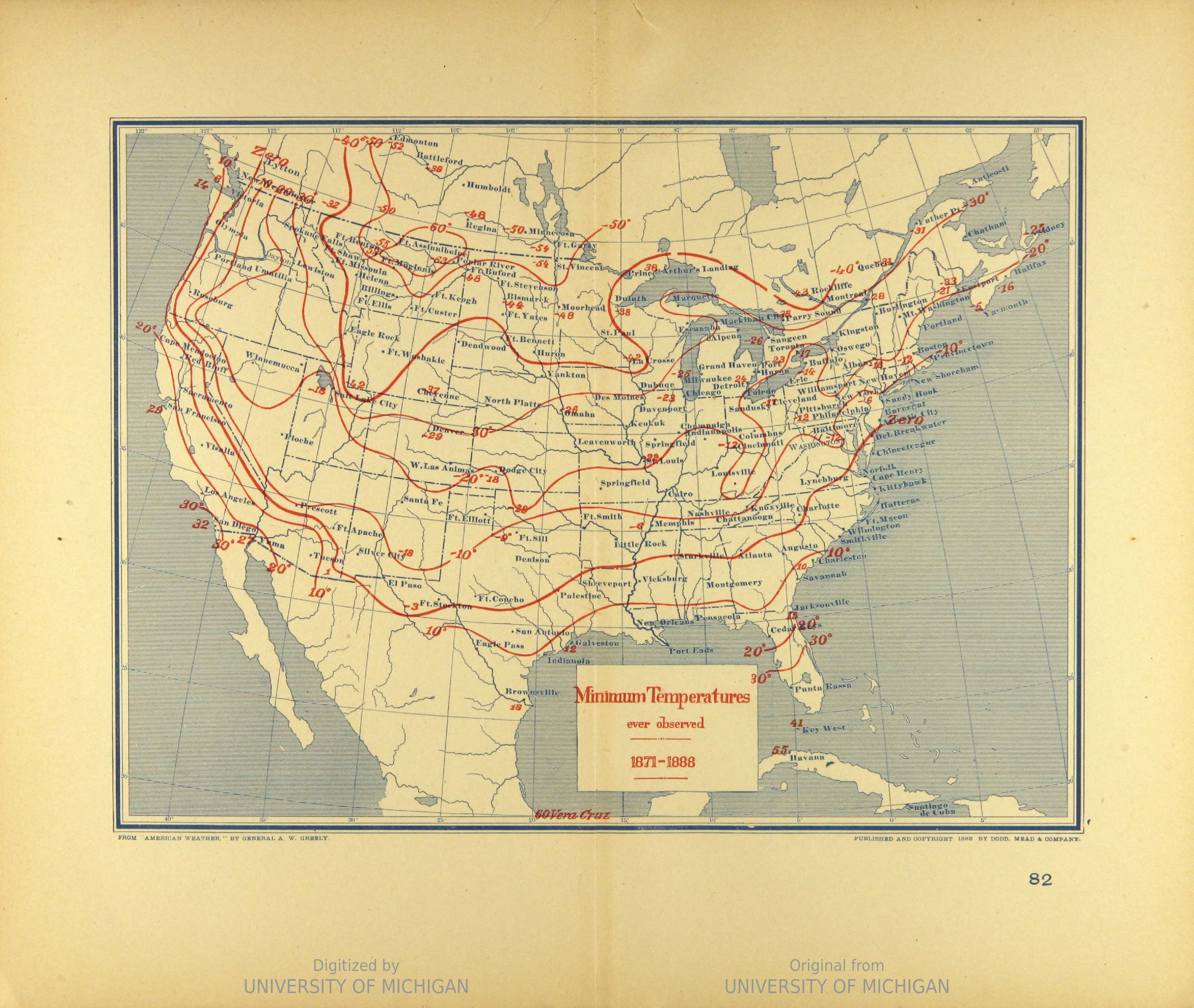
Minimum temperature map of the United States from 1871 to 1888

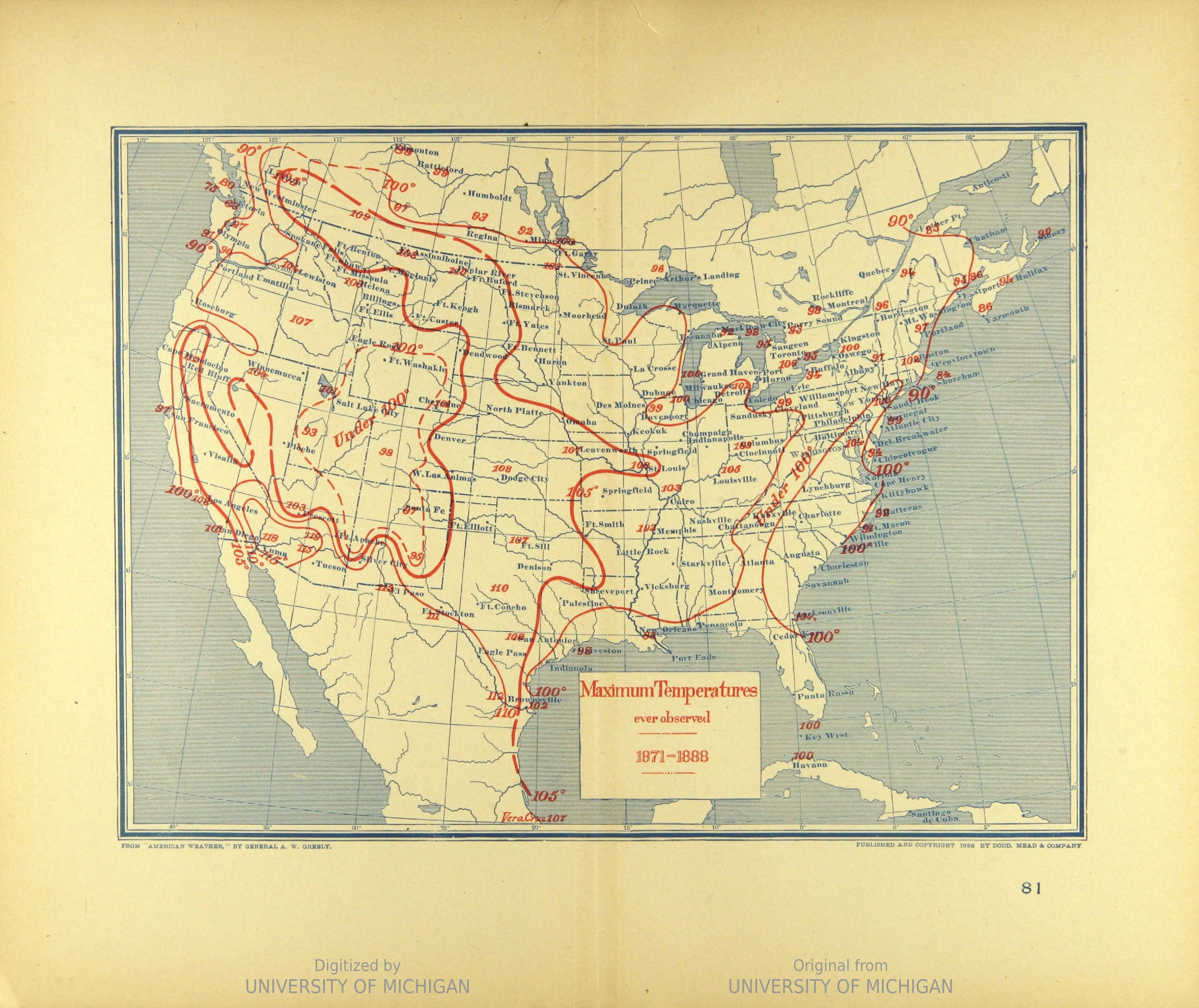
Maximum temperature map of the United States from 1871 to 1888

The following table lists the highest and lowest temperatures recorded in the 50 U.S. states, the District of Columbia, and the 5 inhabited U.S. territories during the past two centuries, in both Fahrenheit and Celsius. If two dates have the same temperature record (e.g. record low of 40 °F or 4.4 °C in 1911 in Aibonito and 1966 in San Sebastian in Puerto Rico), only the most recent date is shown.

== Extreme temperatures for each U.S. state and territory ==
State, federal district, or territory	Record high temperature	Date	Place(s)	Record low temperature	Date	Place(s)	Difference
Alabama	112 °F (44.4 °C)	September 6, 1925	Centreville	−27 °F (−32.8 °C)	January 30, 1966	New Market	139 °F (77.2 °C)
Alaska	100 °F (37.8 °C)	June 27, 1915	Fort Yukon	−80 °F (−62.2 °C)	January 23, 1971	Prospect Creek	180 °F (100 °C)
American Samoa (Note: These are the temperature extremes for Tutuila Island. Temperature extremes for other parts of American Samoa, such as the Manuʻa Islands, are unavailable.)	99 °F (37.2 °C)	April 27, 1972 (Note: Also on earlier date or dates in that state or territory)	Malaeloa/Aitulagi	53 °F (11.7 °C)	March 28, 1962	Malaeloa/Aitulagi	46 °F (25.6 °C)
Arizona	128 °F (53.3 °C)	June 29, 1994	Lake Havasu City	−40 °F (−40 °C)	January 7, 1971	McNary	168 °F (93.3 °C)
Arkansas	120 °F (48.9 °C)	August 10, 1936	Ozark	−29 °F (−33.9 °C)	February 13, 1905	Gravette	149 °F (82.8 °C)
California	134 °F (56.7 °C)	July 10, 1913	Greenland Ranch (Death Valley)	−45 °F (−42.8 °C)	January 20, 1937	Boca	179 °F (99.4 °C)
Colorado	115 °F (46.1 °C)	July 20, 2019	John Martin Reservoir	−61 °F (−51.7 °C)	February 1, 1985	Maybell	176 °F (97.8 °C)
Connecticut	106 °F (41.1 °C)	July 15, 1995	Danbury	−37 °F (−38.3 °C)	February 16, 1943	Norfolk	143 °F (79.4 °C)
Delaware	110 °F (43.3 °C)	July 21, 1930	Millsboro	−17 °F (−27.2 °C)	January 17, 1893	Millsboro	127 °F (70.6 °C)
District of Columbia	106 °F (41.1 °C)	July 20, 1930	Washington	−15 °F (−26.1 °C)	February 11, 1899	Washington	121 °F (67.2 °C)
Florida	109 °F (42.8 °C)	June 29, 1931	Monticello	−2 °F (−18.9 °C)	February 13, 1899	Tallahassee	111 °F (61.7 °C)
(Georgia (U.S. state)) Georgia	112 °F (44.4 °C)	August 20, 1983	Greenville	−17 °F (−27.2 °C)	January 27, 1940	Beatum	129 °F (71.7 °C)
Guam	100 °F (37.8 °C)	September 10, 1945	Sånta Rita-Sumai	56 °F (13.3 °C)	May 31, 1987	Inalåhan	44 °F (24.4 °C)
Hawaii	100 °F (37.8 °C)	April 27, 1931	Pahala	15 °F (−9.4 °C)	January 5, 1975	Mauna Kea Observatories	85 °F (47 °C)
Idaho	118 °F (47.8 °C)	July 28, 1934	Orofino	−60 °F (−51.1 °C)	January 18, 1943	Island Park	178 °F (98.9 °C)
Illinois	117 °F (47.2 °C)	July 14, 1954	East Saint Louis	−38 °F (−38.9 °C)	January 31, 2019	Mount Carroll	155 °F (86.1 °C)
Indiana	116 °F (46.7 °C)	July 14, 1936	Collegeville	−36 °F (−37.8 °C)	January 19, 1994	New Whiteland	152 °F (84.4 °C)
Iowa	118 °F (47.8 °C)	July 20, 1934	Keokuk	−47 °F (−43.9 °C)	February 3, 1996	Elkader	165 °F (91.7 °C)
Kansas	121 °F (49.4 °C)	July 24, 1936	Alton	−40 °F (−40.0 °C)	February 13, 1905	Lebanon	161 °F (89.4 °C)
Kentucky	114 °F (45.6 °C)	July 28, 1930	Greensburg	−37 °F (−38.3 °C)	January 19, 1994	Shelbyville	151 °F (83.9 °C)
Louisiana	114 °F (45.6 °C)	August 10, 1936	Plain Dealing	−16 °F (−26.7 °C)	February 13, 1899	Minden	130 °F (72.2 °C)
Maine	105 °F (40.6 °C)	July 10, 1911	North Bridgton	−50 °F (−45.6 °C)	January 16, 2009	Clayton Lake	155 °F (86.1 °C)
Maryland	109 °F (42.8 °C)	June 21, 1988	Conowingo Dam & Darlington	−40 °F (−40 °C)	January 13, 1912	Oakland	149 °F (82.8 °C)
Massachusetts	107 °F (41.7 °C)	August 2, 1975	New Bedford	−40 °F (−40 °C)	January 22, 1984	Chester	147 °F (81.7 °C)
Michigan	112 °F (44.4 °C)	July 13, 1936	Mio	−51 °F (−46.1 °C)	February 9, 1934	Vanderbilt	163 °F (90.6 °C)
Minnesota	115 °F (46.1 °C)	July 29, 1917	Beardsley	−60 °F (−51.1 °C)	February 2, 1996	Tower	175 °F (97.2 °C)
Mississippi	115 °F (46.1 °C)	July 29, 1930	Holly Springs	−19 °F (−28.3 °C)	January 30, 1966	Corinth	134 °F (74.4 °C)
Missouri	118 °F (47.8 °C)	July 14, 1954	Warsaw	−40 °F (−40 °C)	February 13, 1905	Warsaw	158 °F (87.8 °C)
Montana	117 °F (47.2 °C)	July 5, 1937	Medicine Lake	−70 °F (−56.7 °C)	January 20, 1954	Lincoln (Rogers Pass)	188 °F (104.4 °C)
Nebraska	118 °F (47.8 °C)	July 24, 1936	Minden	−47 °F (−43.9 °C)	December 22, 1989	Oshkosh	165 °F (91.7 °C)
Nevada	125 °F (51.7 °C)	June 29, 1994	Laughlin	−50 °F (−45.6 °C)	January 8, 1937	San Jacinto	175 °F (97.2 °C)
New Hampshire	106 °F (41.1 °C)	July 4, 1911	Nashua	−50 °F (−45.6 °C)	January 22, 1885	Mount Washington	156 °F (86.7 °C)
New Jersey	110 °F (43.3 °C)	July 10, 1936	Runyon	−34 °F (−36.7 °C)	January 5, 1904	River Vale	144 °F (80 °C)
New Mexico	122 °F (50 °C)	June 27, 1994	Waste Isolation Pilot Plant	−57 °F (−49.4 °C)	January 13, 1963	Ciniza	179 °F (99.4 °C)
(New York (state)) New York	108 °F (42.2 °C)	July 22, 1926	Troy	−60 °F (−51.1 °C)	December 29, 1933	Wanakena	160 °F (88.9 °C)
North Carolina	110 °F (43.3 °C)	August 21, 1983	Fayetteville	−34 °F (−36.7 °C)	January 21, 1985	Burnsville	144 °F (80 °C)
North Dakota	121 °F (49.4 °C)	July 6, 1936	Steele	−60 °F (−51.1 °C)	February 15, 1936	Parshall	181 °F (100.6 °C)
Northern Mariana Islands (Note: These are the temeperature extremes for Saipan, Tinian and Rota. Temperature extremes for the Northern Islands Municipality are unavailable.)	99 °F (37.2 °C)	July 8, 2010	Saipan	62 °F (16.7 °C)	December 15, 2000	Saipan	37 °F (20.6 °C)
Ohio	113 °F (45 °C)	July 21, 1934	Gallipolis	−39 °F (−39.4 °C)	February 10, 1899	Milligan	152 °F (84.4 °C)
Oklahoma	120 °F (48.9 °C)	June 27, 1994	Tipton	−31 °F (−35.0 °C)	February 10, 2011	Nowata	151 °F (83.9 °C)
Oregon	119 °F (48.3 °C)	June 29, 2021	Pelton Dam	−54 °F (−47.8 °C)	February 10, 1933	Seneca	172 °F (96 °C)
Pennsylvania	111 °F (43.9 °C)	July 10, 1936	Phoenixville	−42 °F (−41.1 °C)	January 5, 1904	Smethport	153 °F (85 °C)
Puerto Rico	104 °F (40 °C)	July 2, 1996	Isla de Mona (Mayagüez)	40 °F (4.4 °C)	January 24, 1966	San Sebastián	64 °F (35.6 °C)
Rhode Island	104 °F (40 °C)	August 2, 1975	Providence	−28 °F (−33.3 °C)	January 17, 1942	Richmond	132 °F (73.3 °C)
South Carolina	113 °F (45 °C)	June 29, 2012	Columbia	−22 °F (−30 °C)	January 21, 1985	Landrum (Hogback Mountain)	135 °F (75 °C)
South Dakota	120 °F (48.9 °C)	July 15, 2006	Fort Pierre	−60 °F (−51 °C)	December 22, 1989	Rochford	180 °F (100.0 °C)
Tennessee	113 °F (45 °C)	August 9, 1930	Perryville	−32 °F (−35.6 °C)	December 30, 1917	Mountain City	145 °F (80.6 °C)
Texas	120 °F (48.9 °C)	June 28, 1994	Monahans	−23 °F (−30.6 °C)	February 8, 1933	Seminole	143 °F (79.4 °C)
Utah	117 °F (47.2 °C)	July 10, 2021	St. George	−69 °F (−56.1 °C)	February 1, 1985	Peter Sinks	186 °F (103.3 °C)
Vermont	105 °F (40.6 °C)	July 4, 1911	Vernon	−50 °F (−45.6 °C)	December 30, 1933	Bloomfield	155 °F (86.1 °C)
(United States Virgin Islands) Virgin Islands (U.S.)	99 °F (37.2 °C)	June 23, 1996	Charlotte Amalie West (Cyril E. King Airport)	51 °F (10.6 °C)	January 31, 1954	Anna's Hope (Saint Croix)	48 °F (26.7 °C)
Virginia	110 °F (43.3 °C)	July 15, 1954	Balcony Falls	−30 °F (−34.4 °C)	January 22, 1985	Pembroke	140 °F (77.8 °C)
(Washington (state)) Washington	120 °F (48.9 °C)	June 29, 2021	Hanford Site	−48 °F (−44.4 °C)	December 30, 1968	Mazama, Winthrop	168 °F (93.3 °C)
West Virginia	112 °F (44.4 °C)	July 10, 1936	Martinsburg	−37 °F (−38.3 °C)	December 30, 1917	Lewisburg	149 °F (82.8 °C)
Wisconsin	114 °F (45.6 °C)	July 13, 1936	Wisconsin Dells	−55 °F (−48.3 °C)	February 4, 1996	Couderay	169 °F (93.9 °C)
Wyoming	115 °F (46.1 °C)	July 15, 1988	Diversion Dam	−63 °F (−52.8 °C)	February 9, 1933	Moran	178 °F (98.9 °C)

Unreferenced data assumed to be from NOAA

== See also ==
- Canadian provincial and territorial temperature extremes
- February 2023 North American cold wave — Mount Washington in New Hampshire experienced a record breaking wind chill of −108 °F (−78 °C).
