= Lynching of John Glover =

- Part of Jim Crow Era
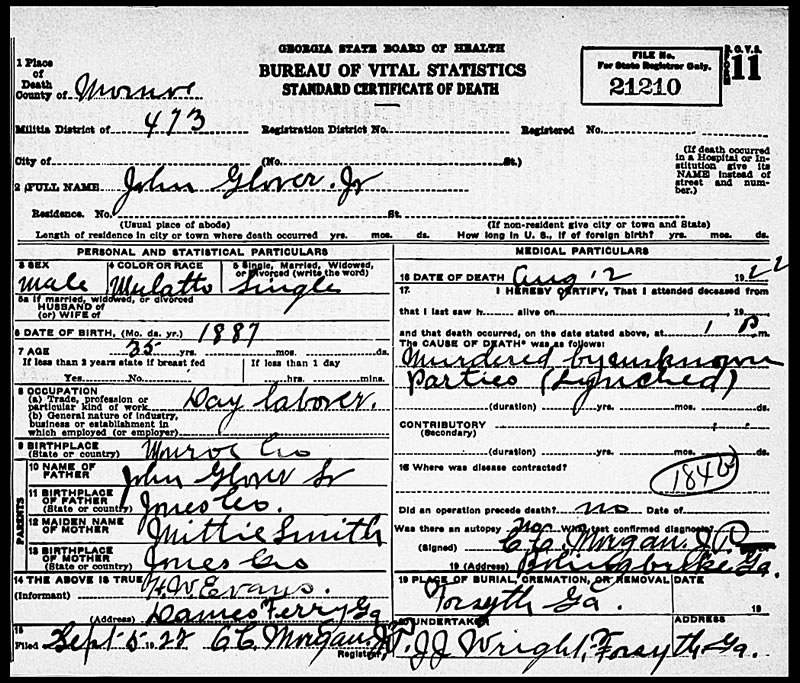
- Death certificate for John Glover 1922
- Date: August 2, 1922
- Location: Holton in Bibb County, Georgia
- Participants: White mob of 300
- Deaths: John Glover

John "Cockey" Glover was a 35-year-old African-American man who was lynched in Holton in Bibb County, Georgia by a mob of 300 white men on August 2, 1922. It was the 43rd of 61 lynchings during 1922 in the United States.

== Background ==
Six feet, five inches tall Deputy Sheriff Walter C. Byrd started working at the local prison but he was so brutal to its inmates that he was transferred to the Sheriff's department. There he developed a reputation for racial brutality. Just after 6:00 PM on July 29, 1922, Byrd entered Hatfield's Pool Hall on Hollywood Avenue in Macon. The pool hall was owned by Charles Henry Douglass, the wealthiest Black man in Macon. In Hatfield a scuffle broke out and claiming self-defense Glover shot and killed Walter C. Byrd. Another deputy there, Romas Raley, shot and killed George Marshall and mortally wounded Samuel Brooks, two Black men who happened to be playing pool.

Glover escaped but the police stopped all trains and released a bulletin that read: "John (Cocky) Glover, aged 25, 5 feet 6 or 7inches in height; light mulatto; right eye cocked; wears gray striped pitch-black suit of clothes; clean shaven; neat dresser. Reward of $300 [$5,800 in 2025] will be paid by the sheriff of Bibb county for his apprehension."

The day after the shooting Macon police began door-to-door warrantless searches of houses in the Black Macon neighborhoods of Pleasant Hill, Tindall Field, Unionville, and other majority Black areas. In Griffin, Georgia police officers T.F. Phelps and Jim Huckabee arrested Glover on a train as he tried to flee to Chicago. Word of his arrest reached Macon and a mob of some 300 white people drove to Griffin. Police tried to secretly return Glover to Macon but they were intercepted by the mob on the road, 2 miles (3.2 km) from Holton in Bibb County, Georgia.

Glover was tied to a tree, riddled with bullets and set on fire. The mob took the mutilated body and paraded it through the Black areas of Macon and tried to display it in C.H. Douglass's theatre. Police finally seized the body but did not move it from the curb outside the theatre. Thousands of Macon residents came to view the body, some fighting to grab a souvenir from the corpse.

== National memorial ==
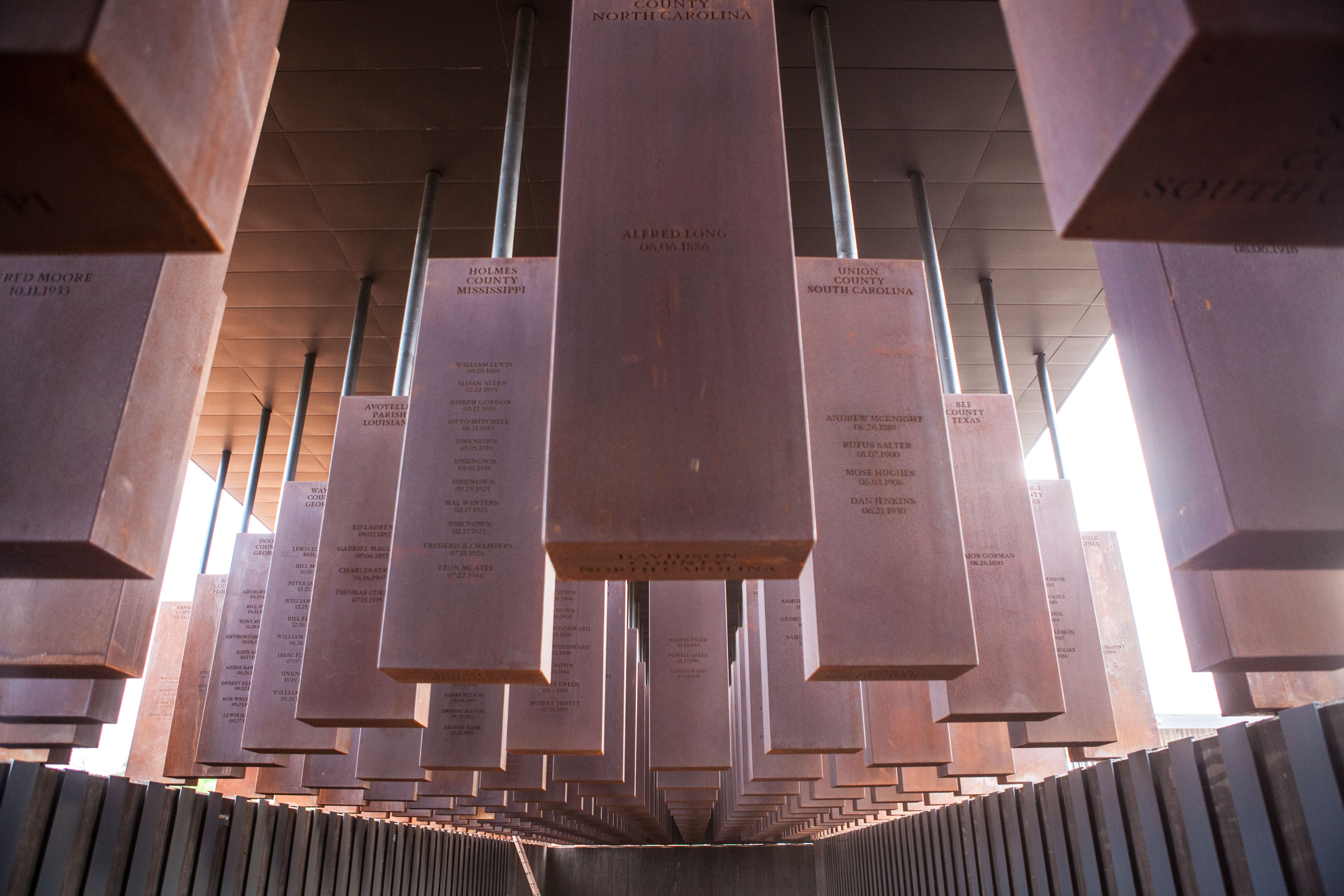
Memorial Corridor, National Memorial for Peace and Justice

The National Memorial for Peace and Justice opened in Montgomery, Alabama, on April 26, 2018. Featured among other things is the Memorial Corridor which displays 805 hanging steel rectangles, each representing the counties in the United States where a documented lynching took place and, for each county, the names of those lynched. The memorial hopes that communities, like Macon–Bibb County where John Glover was lynched, will take these slabs and install them in their own communities.

== See also ==
- List of lynching victims in the United States

== Bibliography ==
Notes

References

- Aiello, Thomas (2021). "The Three Deaths of John Glover, 1922". Georgia Historical Quarterly. Georgia Historical Society: 87–115. ISSN 0016-8297. LCCN 20007222. OCLC 173431983.
- "Body riddled with bullets". The Manning Times. Manning, Clarendon, South Carolina: S.A. Nettles. August 2, 1922. pp. 1–8. ISSN 2330-8826. OCLC 13611767.
- "Closing Negro shops prevents Macon race riot". The Pensacola Journal. Pensacola, Escambia, Florida: Mayes & Co. August 2, 1922. pp. 1–8. ISSN 1941-109X. OCLC 16280864.
- Robertson, Campbell (April 25, 2018). "A Lynching Memorial Is Opening. The Country Has Never Seen Anything Like It". The New York Times.
- Slade, Paul (2022). "White riot: a Georgia lynching". Planetslade.com.
- United States Senate Committee on the Judiciary (1926). "To Prevent and Punish the Crime of Lynching: Hearings Before the United States Senate Committee on the Judiciary, Subcommittee on S. 121, Sixty-Ninth Congress, First Session, on Feb. 16, 1926". United States Government Publishing Office.

Number	Name	Date	Place	Method of lynching	Number of victims
1	Bill McAllister	January 8, 1922	Williamsburg, S.C.	Shot	1
2	Lincoln Hickson	January 8, 1922	Williamsburg, S.C.	Shot	1
3	Willie Jenkins	January 10, 1922	Eufaula, Alabama	Shot	1
4	Jake Brooks	January 14, 1922	Oklahoma City, Oklahoma	Hanged	1
5	Charles Strong	January 17, 1922	Mayo, Florida	Hanged	1
6	Will Bell	January 29, 1922	Pontotoc, Mississippi	Shot	1
7	Unidentified	January 29, 1922	Pontotoc, Mississippi	Shot	
8	Drew Conner (White)	January 28, 1922	Bolinger, Alabama	Burned	1
9	Will Thrasher	February 1, 1922	Crystal Springs, Mississippi	Hanged	1
10	Harry Harrison	February 2, 1922	Malvern, Arkansas	Shot	1
11	Manuel Duarte	February 2, 1922	Cameron County, Texas	Shot	1
12	P. Norman	February 11, 1922	Texarkana, Arkansas	Shot	1
13	Will Jones	February 13, 1922	Ellaville, Georgia	Shot	1
14	William Baker	March 8, 1922	Aberdeen, Mississippi	Hanged	1
15	Alfred Williams	March 12, 1922	Harlem, Georgia	Hanged	1
16	Brown Culpepper (White)	March 13, 1922	Holly Grove, Louisiana	Shot	1
17	Jerry Ingram	March 17, 1922	Crawford, Mississippi	Shot	1
18	Unidentified (white)	March 19, 1922	Okay, Oklahoma	Drowned	1
19	Alexander Smith	March 22, 1922	Gulfport, Mississippi	Hanged	1
20	Snap Curry	May 6, 1922	Kirvin, Texas	Burned	1
21	H. Varney (or Johnnie Cornish)	May 6, 1922	Kirvin, Texas	Burned	1
22	Mose Jones	May 6, 1922	Kirvin, Texas	Burned	1
23	Tom Cornish	May 8, 1922	Kirvin, Texas	Hanged	1
24	Thomas Early	May 17, 1922	Conroe, Texas	Burned	1
25	Charles Atkins	May 18, 1922	Davisboro, Georgia	Burned	1
26	Hullen Owens	May 19, 1922	Texarkana, Texas	Hanged (body burned)	1
27	Joe Winters	May 20, 1922	Conroe, Texas	Burned	1
28	Mose Bozier	May 20, 1922	Alleyton, Texas	Hanged	1
29	Gilbert Wilson	May 23, 1922	Bryan, Texas	Beaten to death	1
30	Jesse Thomas	May 26, 1922	Waco, Texas	Shot (body burned)	1
31	William Byrd	May 28, 1922	Brentwood, Georgia	Shot (body burned)	1
32	Robert Collins	June 20, 1922	Summit, Mississippi	Hanged	1
33	Warren Lewis	June 23, 1922	New Dacus, Texas	Hanged	1
34	James Harvey	July 1, 1922	Lanes Bridge, Georgia	Hanged	1
35	Joe Jordan	July 1, 1922	Lanes Bridge, Georgia	Hanged	1
36	Philip Tankard	July 5, 1922	Belhaven, North Carolina	Shot	1
37	Joe Pemberton	July 7, 1922	Benton, Louisiana	Hanged	1
38	Jake "Shake" Davis	July 14, 1922	Miller County, Georgia	Hanged	1
39	Oscar Mack	July 18, 1922	Orange County, Florida	Hanged (False report, Oscar Mack survived)	1
40	Will Anderson	July 24, 1922	Allentown, Georgia	Shot	1
41	John West	July 28, 1922	Guernsey, Arkansas	Shot	1
42	Gilbert Harris	August 1, 1922	Hot Springs, Arkansas	Hanged	1
43	John Glover	August 1, 1922	Holton,	Shot	1
44	Bayner Blackwell	August 6, 1922	Swansboro, North Carolina	Shot	1
45	John Steelman	August 23, 1922	Lambert, Mississippi	Burned	1
46	Thomas Rivers	August 30, 1922	Bossier Parish, Louisiana	Hanged	1
47	F. Watt Daniels (White)	August 1922	Mer Rouge, Louisiana	Ku-Klux Klan	1
48	Thomas F. Richards (White)	August 1922	Mer Rouge, Louisiana	Ku-Klux Klan	1
49	Jim Reed Long	September 2, 1922	Winder, Georgia	Ku-Klux Klan	1
50	O.J. Johnson	September 7, 1922	Newton, Texas	Hanged	1
51	Jim Johnston	September 28, 1922	Sandersville, Georgia	Hanged	1
52	Grover C. Everett	September 28, 1922	Abilene, Texas	Shot	1
53	John Brown	October 3, 1922	Montgomery, Alabama	Shot	1
54	Ed Hartley (white)	October 20, 1922	Camden, Tennessee	Shot	1
55	George Hartley (white)	October 20, 1922	Camden, Tennessee	Shot	1
56	Elias V. Zarate	November 11, 1922	Weslaco, Texas	Shot	1
57	Cupid Dickson / Cubrit Dixon	December 5, 1922	Madison, Florida	Shot	1
58	Charles Wright	December 8 ,1922	Perry, Florida	Burned	1
59	Less Smith	December 9, 1922	Morrilton, Arkansas	Burned	1
60	George Gay	December 11, 1922	Streetman, Texas	Hanged	1
61	Arthur Young	December 11, 1922	Perry, Florida	Hanged	1
