= Birner =

Birner is a surname. Notable people with the surname include:

- Betty Birner, American linguist
- Michal Birner (born 1986), Czech ice hockey player
- Stanislav Birner (born 1956), Czech tennis player
- Dr. N. Birner, pen name of Austrian writer and journalist Nathan Birnbaum

== See also ==
- Berner
