= Great Chelsea Fire =

Great Chelsea Fire may refer to one of the notable fires that have occurred in Chelsea, Massachusetts, U.S.:

- Great Chelsea fire of 1908, also known as the First Great Chelsea Fire, which began on April 12, 1908
- Great Chelsea fire of 1973, also known as the Second Great Chelsea Fire, which began on October 14, 1973

== See also ==
- Chelsea (disambiguation)
