= Brownwood =

Brownwood can refer to:

- Brownwood, Morgan County, Georgia
- Brownwood, Missouri, an unincorporated community
- Brownwood, Texas, a city
- Brownwood (North Bloomfield, Ohio), on the National Register of Historic Places
