= Crowville =

Crowville may refer to:

- Crowville, Georgia
- Crowville, Louisiana
