= Cokeville =

Cokeville may refer to the following places in the United States:

- Cokeville, Pennsylvania
- Cokeville, Wyoming
  - Cokeville Meadows National Wildlife Refuge

== See also ==
- Cookville (disambiguation)
- Cookeville, Tennessee
- The Cokeville Miracle, a 2015 drama film
