= Arkwright town =

Arkwright Town could be:

- Arkwright Town in Derbyshire, England
- Arkwright, Alabama, USA
- Arkwright, Georgia, USA
- Arkwright, New York, USA
