= Burning bush (disambiguation) =

The burning bush is a supernatural phenomenon in the Book of Exodus used as a symbol by various Presbyterian denominations.

The term (also burning-bush and burningbush) may also refer to:

== Plant common names ==
- Bassia scoparia, large annual herb in the family Chenopodiaceae native to Eurasia introduced to many parts of North America
- Combretum paniculatum, a plant native to Africa
- Dictamnus, a herbaceous plant of the family Rutaceae known for its volatile oils native to southern Europe, North Africa, and much of Asia
- Euonymus
  - Euonymus alatus, the winged spindle or winged euonymus, a plant native to eastern Asia common as an ornamental and invasive in North America
  - Euonymus atropurpureus, the eastern burning bush, a plant native primarily to Midwestern United States
  - Euonymus occidentalis, the western burning bush, a plant native to western North America

== Other uses ==
- Burning Bush, Georgia, an unincorporated community
- Burning Bush, Pennsylvania
- The Burning Bush, a Singaporean theological journal published by the Far Eastern Bible College (§ Publications)
- The Burning Bush, a klezmer band founded by Lucie Skeaping
- Burning Bush Colony, a former Methodist community in Texas, United States
- Burning Bush (miniseries), a miniseries directed by Agnieszka Holland for HBO Europe
- "Burning Bush", a 1988 song by So
- "Burning Bush", a 2013 song Jesse Jagz from Jagz Nation, Vol. 1: Thy Nation Come
- "Burnin' Bush", a 1976 song by Earth, Wind & Fire from Spirit
