= Brownwood, Georgia =

Brownwood may refer to the following places in the United States:

- Brownwood, Henry County, Georgia (east of Stockbridge)
- Brownwood, Morgan County, Georgia (southwest of Madison)
- An alternate name for the East Atlanta neighborhood
- A misspelling of Bronwood, Georgia (in Terrell County)
