= Strouds, Georgia =

Unincorporated community in Georgia, U.S.

Coordinates: 32°55′13″N 84°03′58″W

Strouds is an unincorporated community in Monroe County, in the U.S. state of Georgia.

== History ==
A post office called Strouds was established in 1886, and remained in operation until 1905. Variant names were "Stroud" and "Stroud Crossroads". The community was named after the family of Levi Stroud Sr., early settler.
