= Box Ankle, Georgia =

Unincorporated community in Georgia, U.S.

Coordinates: 33°07′00″N 83°58′24″W

Box Ankle is an unincorporated community in Monroe County, in the U.S. state of Georgia. A variant name is "Boxankle".

== History ==
According to tradition, Box Ankle was named from an incident when a man fractured his ankle as he fell onto a wooden box in a brawl at a cockfight.
