= Chickasawhatchee, Georgia =

Unincorporated community in Georgia, U.S.

Coordinates: 31°42′05″N 84°22′29″W

Chickasawhatchee is an unincorporated community in Terrell County, in the U.S. state of Georgia.

== History ==
The community took its name from Chickasawhatchee Creek. Variant names were "Chickasawhachee", "Chickasawhatchie", and "Hortonville". The Georgia General Assembly incorporated the place as the "Town of Chickawawhatchee" in 1856. The town's municipal charter was officially repealed in 1995.
