= Russellville, Georgia =

Unincorporated community in Georgia, U.S.

Coordinates: 32°54′09″N 83°59′29″W

Russellville is an unincorporated community in Monroe County, in the U.S. state of Georgia.

== History ==
A post office called Russellville was established in 1844, and remained in operation until 1906. The community most likely was named after Alexander Russell, a pioneer settler.
