= Cookville =

Cookville may refer to:

- Cookville, Nova Scotia, Canada
- Cookville, Kansas, US
- Cookville, Missouri, US
- Cookville, Texas, US

== See also ==
- Cookeville, Tennessee
- Cooksville (disambiguation)
- Cokeville (disambiguation)
