= Cooksville =

Cooksville may refer to:

== Places ==
Canada

- Cooksville (Mississauga), a neighbourhood in Mississauga, Ontario, Canada
  - Cooksville GO Station, a station in the GO Transit network located in the neighbourhood
  - Mississauga East—Cooksville, an electoral district of Mississauga which includes the neighbourhood

United States

- Cooksville, Georgia
- Cooksville, Illinois
- Cooksville, Maryland
- Cooksville, Wisconsin
