= Chastain (surname) =

Surname list of people with the last name Chastain

Chastain is a surname. Notable people with the surname include:

- Benny Chastain (1942–2025), American racing driver
- Brandi Chastain (born 1968), American soccer player
- David Chastain (born 1963), American guitarist
- Don Chastain (1935–2002), American actor, singer and screenwriter
- Elijah Webb Chastain (1813–1874), American politician, soldier and lawyer
- James Garvin Chastain Sr., co-founder of the National Baptist Convention of Mexico
- Jane Chastain (born 1943), American sports announcer and conservative political writer and commentator
- Jessica Chastain (born 1977), American actress and film producer
- Ken Chastain (born 1964), American musician, engineer, and producer
- Michael Chastain (born 1955), blind American athlete who played high school football in Troy, Michigan
- Ross Chastain (born 1992), American professional stock car racing driver
- Thomas Chastain (1921–1994), American author of crime fiction

== Fictional characters ==
- Misery Chastain, protagonist of fictitious romance novels in Stephen King's book Misery
- Darryl Louise Chastain, character in Thomas Pynchon's book Vineland
