= Chelsea Girl (disambiguation) =

Chelsea Girl is a 1967 album by Nico.

Chelsea Girl may also refer to:

- "Chelsea Girl", a song from the Simple Minds album Life in a Day
- "Chelsea Girl", a song from the Ride EP Ride
- Chelsea Girl, a former clothing brand now known as River Island

== See also ==
- Chelsea Girls, a 1966 film, by Andy Warhol featuring Nico
- "Chelsea Girls" (song), the title track from the Nico album
- Chelsea F.C. Women
