= Carrs Station, Georgia =

Unincorporated community in Georgia, U.S.

Coordinates: 33°10′29″N 83°07′18″W

Carrs Station is an unincorporated community in Hancock County, in the U.S. state of Georgia.

== History ==
A post office called Carrs Station was established in 1874, and remained in operation until 1950. A variant name was "Carrs". The community most likely was named after J. D. Carr, a local merchant and railroad employee.
