= Daniel Springs, Georgia =

Unincorporated community in Georgia, U.S.

Coordinates: 33°38′58″N 82°58′30″W

Daniel Springs is an unincorporated community in Greene County, in the U.S. state of Georgia. The community is located on State Route 44 between Union Point and Tyrone, between mile markers 25 and 26.

== History ==
A variant name was "Daniels Springs". The community was named after James K. Daniel, a local plantation owner.
