= Adasburg, Georgia =

Unincorporated community in Georgia, U.S.

Coordinates: 33°42′22″N 82°32′53″W

Adasburg is an unincorporated community in Wilkes County, in the U.S. state of Georgia.

== History ==
A post office called Adasburg was established in 1887, and remained in operation until 1905. The community had an inland location away from the railroad.
