= Chokee, Georgia =

Unincorporated community in Georgia, U.S.

Coordinates: 31°53′38″N 84°02′59″W

Chokee is an unincorporated community in Lee County, in the U.S. state of Georgia.

== History ==
A post office called Chokee was established in 1882, and remained in operation until 1905. The community's name is derived from the Muscogee language. In 1900, Chokee had about 120 inhabitants.
