= Antioch, Freestone County, Texas =

Ghost town in Texas, US

Antioch
- Ghost town
- Location in Texas
- Coordinates: 31°38′25″N 96°17′10″W
- Country: United States
- State: Texas
- County: Freestone

Antioch is a ghost town in Freestone County, Texas, United States. Situated on Farm to Market Road 1364, it contained a Baptist church—established in 1873—and a school, which was consolidated by Turlington in 1908. The community was abandoned by the 1960s.
