= Chelsea Hotel (disambiguation) =

Chelsea Hotel may refer to:

- Hotel Chelsea in New York City
- Chelsea Hotel (Atlantic City) in Atlantic City, New Jersey
- "Chelsea Hotel No. 2", a song from the 1974 Leonard Cohen album New Skin for the Old Ceremony
- Chelsea Hotel, a book of photographs by Claudio Edinger, published in 1983
- Chelsea Hotel, Toronto

== See also ==
- Chelsea Horror Hotel, a 2001 novel written by Dee Dee Ramone
