= Chelsea, Jersey City =

Populated place in Hudson County, New Jersey, US

Coordinates: 40.754°N 74.057°W

Chelsea was a historical locality in what is now the northwestern portion of The Heights neighborhood of Jersey City, New Jersey. The area was originally part of Hudson City, an independent municipality that existed from 1855 until its consolidation with Jersey City in 1869. Chelsea was located near the Transfer Station area at Paterson Plank Road and near the border with the former municipality of West Hoboken (now part of Union City).

== History ==
Chelsea developed as part of Hudson City during the mid-nineteenth century. Historical maps of Hudson County identify Chelsea as a named section of Hudson City before the municipality was annexed by Jersey City. Following consolidation, the name gradually fell out of common use as the area became associated with Jersey City Heights.

== Geography ==
Chelsea occupied the northwestern portion of present-day The Heights. The area was situated near the Transfer Station commercial district at Paterson Plank Road, a historic transportation hub that marked the meeting point between Jersey City and the municipalities of North Hudson.

== See also ==
The Heights, Jersey City

Hudson City, New Jersey

West Hoboken, New Jersey
