= Antioch Colony, Texas =

Antioch Colony
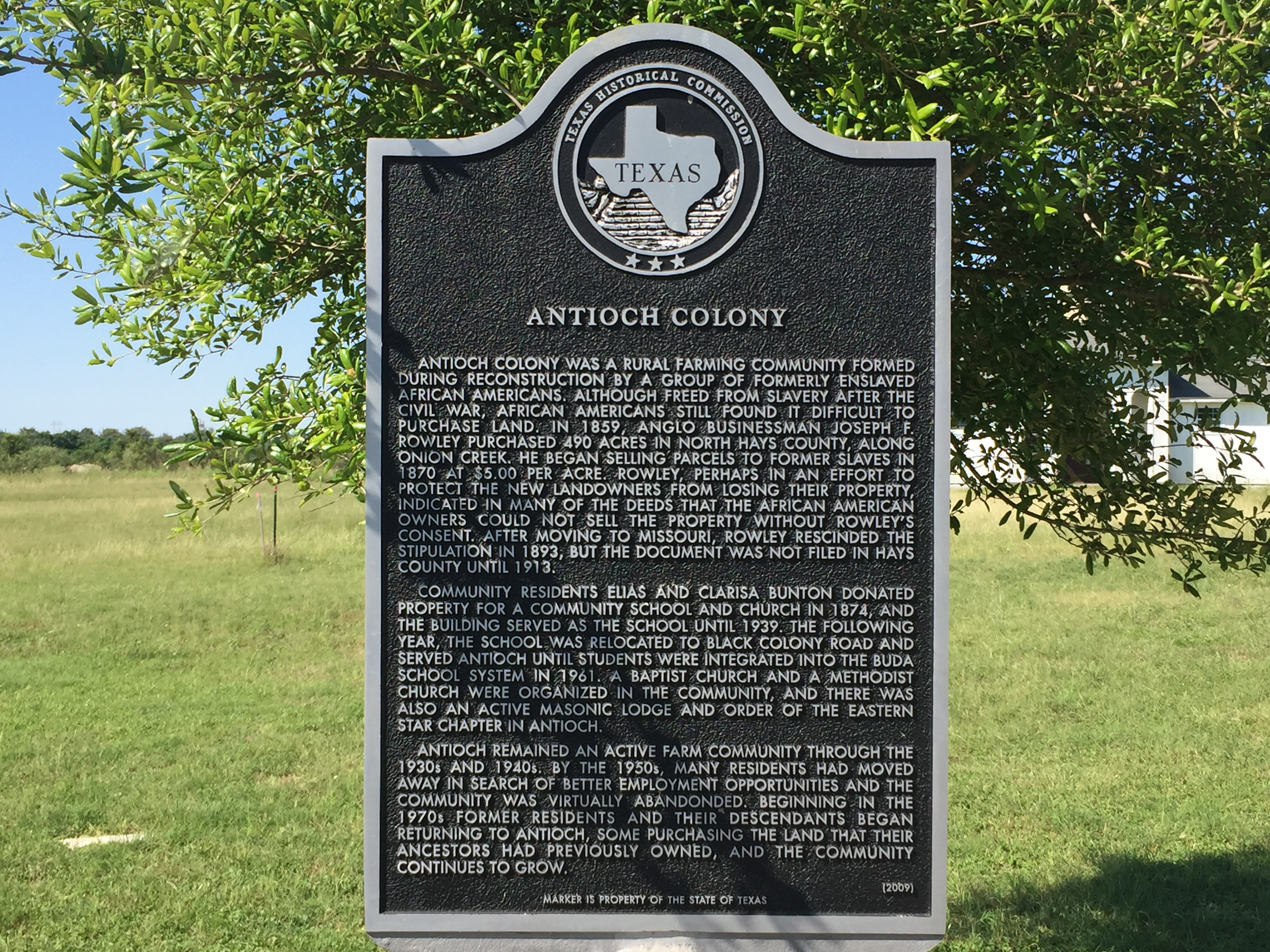
- Antioch Colony Historical Marker

- Location within the state of Texas Antioch Colony (the United States)
- Coordinates: 30°5′8″N 97°51′1″W
- Country: United States
- State: Texas
- County: Hays
- Established: 1870

Area
  - Total: .77 sq mi (2.0 km^{2})

Population (2009)Estimated
  - Total: 25
- Time zone: UTC-6 (Central (CST))
  - Summer (DST): UTC-5 (CDT)
- ZIP codes: 78610

Antioch Colony is an unincorporated community in Hays County, Texas, on Old Black Colony Road between Farm roads 967 and 1626, northwest of Buda.

== History ==
Antioch Colony was founded by former slaves in 1870. About a dozen families purchased land from Joseph F. Rowley and established a farming community, raising cows and horses, and planting corn, sugarcane and cotton. In 1874, Elias and Clarisa Bunton donated land for a school and a two-story schoolhouse was built. The school was in use until 1961, when the Buda schools were desegregated.

Antioch Colony was an active farm community through the 1950s when residents moved to cities for work. In the 1970s former residents began to return re-establishing the community.

In 1997 the Antioch Community Church was built on the site of the original schoolhouse, and in 2011 a community effort led to the placement of a historical marker also at this location.
