= Chelsea Council =

Chelsea Council may refer to:

- Chelsea Council BSA, a division of the Boston Minuteman Council of the Boy Scouts of America
- Council of Chelsea, any of several Synods of Chelsea held in Anglo-Saxon England in Chelsea, London, from 787 to 816
- Chelsea Metropolitan Borough Council, a Metropolitan borough of the County of London between 1900 and 1965
