= Cenchat, Georgia =

Unincorporated community in Georgia, U.S.

Coordinates: 34°54′46″N 85°20′45″W

Cenchat is an unincorporated community in Walker County, in the U.S. state of Georgia.

== History ==
A post office called Cenchat was in operation from 1902 until 1909. The community was named from its location near the junction of the Central of Georgia and Chattanooga Southern railroads.
