= Beall Springs, Georgia =

- Unincorporated community
- Location within the state of Georgia Beall Springs, Georgia (the United States)
- Coordinates: 33°18′33″N 82°42′58″W
- Country: United States
- State: Georgia
- County: Warren
- Elevation: 554 ft (169 m)
- Time zone: UTC-5 (Eastern (EST))
  - Summer (DST): UTC-4 (EDT)
- Area code: 706
- GNIS ID: 331111

Beall Springs is an unincorporated community in Warren County, in the U.S. state of Georgia.

== History ==
Beall Springs was named after the Beall family, original owners of the town site.
