= Antioch, Claiborne Parish, Louisiana =

Unincorporated community in Louisiana, U.S.

Coordinates: 32°51′53″N 92°55′29″W

Antioch is an unincorporated community in Claiborne Parish, Louisiana, United States.
