= Antioch, Virginia =

Unincorporated community in Virginia, United States

Coordinates: 37°50′48″N 78°25′14″W

Antioch is an unincorporated community in Fluvanna County, Virginia, in the U.S. state of Virginia.
