= Center Post, Georgia =

Unincorporated community in Georgia, U.S.

Coordinates: 34°36′29″N 85°21′11″W

Center Post is an unincorporated community in Walker County, in the U.S. state of Georgia.

== History ==
A post office called Centre Post was established in 1884 and remained in operation until it was discontinued in 1904. Center Post was named from its relatively central location between Bronco and Trion. Another tradition states a hitching post in center of town caused the name to be adopted.
