= Antioch, Lincoln Parish, Louisiana =

Unincorporated community in Louisiana, U.S.

Coordinates: 32°35′11″N 92°44′21″W

Antioch is an unincorporated community in Lincoln Parish, Louisiana, United States.
