= Antioch, Panola County, Texas =

Unincorporated community in Texas, US

Antioch
- Unincorporated community
- Location in Texas
- Coordinates: 32.1023860°N 94.2718631°W
- Country: United States
- State: Texas
- County: Panola
- Elevation: 269 ft (82 m)

Antioch is an unincorporated community in Panola County, Texas, United States. Settled in the late 18th century, a school opened c. 1900, with an enrollment of 61 by 1906; it was consolidated by Carthage Independent School District in the 1940s. It was nearly abandoned by the mid-1960s, but as of 2000, it had 121 residents.
