= Achord, Georgia =

Unincorporated community in Georgia, United States

Coordinates: 32°06′23″N 82°58′08″W

Achord is an unincorporated community in Dodge County, in the U.S. state of Georgia.

== History ==
A post office called Achord was established in 1898, and remained in operation until 1905. Besides the post office, Achord had a rail depot.
