= Cobbville, Georgia =

Unincorporated community in the state of Georgia

Coordinates: 31°55′05″N 82°58′57″W

Cobbville is an unincorporated community in Telfair County, in the U.S. state of Georgia.

== History ==
An early variant name was "Cameron Mills", after J. W. Cameron, the proprietor of a local gristmill. A post office called "Cobbsville" was established in 1851, and remained in operation until 1935.
