= Baldwinville, Georgia =

Unincorporated community in Georgia, U.S.

Coordinates: 32°39′03″N 84°26′59″W

Baldwinville is an unincorporated community in Talbot County, in the U.S. state of Georgia.

== History ==
A post office called Baldwinville was established in 1890, and remained in operation until 1907. Baldwinville was located inland, away from railroads. The community had a schoolhouse, now defunct.
