= Boel Berner =

Swedish sociologist, historian and editor

Boel Berner (born 3 August 1945) is a Swedish sociologist, historian, and editor.

== Early life and education ==
Karin Boel Christina Berner was born 3 August 1945 in Helsingborg. She graduated with a bachelor's degree from Lund University in 1967, and a PhD in sociology from Lund University in 1981.

== Research and career ==
Berner became an associate professor in sociology in 1988. She has studied and done research several times in London and Paris. From 1991 she was a professor on the topic of technology and social change at Linköping University. She is a member of the international gender research network Mage, based in Paris. Berner's research has focused on four main areas, using historical analysis and participatory observation and interviews: medical technology and practice; the nature and social role of technical knowledge; gender and technology; and risk and uncertainty.

She served as editor of the magazine Zenit (1974–85), for Sociological Research (1976–1977), for Acta Sociologica (1980–1981), and for Women's Journal of Science (1981). Berner is a scientific editor of the Pandora series on Arkiv förlag, with a focus on science, technology and medicine in society.

== Selected works ==
- Skola, ideologi och samhälle (edited with Staf Callewaert & Henning Silberbrandt, 1977)
- Utbildning och arbetsdelning (edited with Staf Callewaert & Henning Silberbrandt, 1979)
- Teknikens värld (doctoral thesis, 1981, new edition 2012)
- Kunskapens vägar (1989)
- Regeln i undantaget. Om olyckor, kunskap och tekniska system (1992)
- Från symaskin till cyborg (edited with Elisabeth Sundin, 1996)
- Sakernas tillstånd. Kön, klass, teknisk expertis (1996)
- Gendered practices. Feminist studies of technology and society (edited 1997)
- Perpetuum mobile?Teknikens utmaningar och historiens gång (1999)
- Manoeuvering in an Environment of Uncertainty. Structural Change and Social Action in Sub-Saharan Africa (edited with Per Trulsson, 2000)
- Suède: l´égalité des sexes en question (edited with Elisabeth Elgán & Jacqueline Heinen, 2000)
- Constructing Risk and Safety in Technological Practice (edited with Jane Summerton, 2003)
- Vem tillhör tekniken? Kunskap och kön i teknikens värld (2003)
- Ifrågasättanden. Forskning om genus, teknik och naturvetenskap (2004)
- Technology and Medical Practice. Blood, Guts, and Machines (edited with Ericka Johnson, 2010)
- Social Science Research 2004-2010. Themes, results and reflections (on nuclear waste issues) (with Britt-Marie Drottz Sjöberg & Einar Holm, 2011)
- Vad är tvärvetenskap och hur kan den göras. Erfarenheter från forskningen om teknik och samhälle (2011)
- Blodflöden. Blodgivning och blodtransfusion i det svenska samhället (2012)
- Knowledge and Evidence: Investigating Technologies in Practice (edited with Corinna Kruse, 2013)
- Kön, kropp, materialitet: Perspektiv från fransk genusforskning (edited with Isabelle Dussauge, 2014)
- Strange Blood: The Rise and Fall of Lamb Blood Transfusion in 19th Century Medicine and Beyond, transcript Verlag (2020)
- Mat, misär och ett medicinskt mysterium: Historien om pellagra (2024)
