= Michael Chastain =

American blind athlete (born 1955)

Michael Chastain (born April 16, 1955) was a blind athlete who played high school football in Troy, Michigan.

At five-years-old, Chastain lost sight in his right eye in an archery accident. Beginning at age eight, Chastain had glaucoma which decreased his vision to 10 percent of sight in his left eye and allowed only the ability to distinguish between light and dark by the age of 15. Chastain attended Troy High School in Troy, Michigan where he played guard on the football team. He later wrestled for four years at Central Michigan University.
