= Blackshear Place, Georgia =

- Unincorporated community
- Location within Georgia Location within the United States
- Coordinates: 34°13′15.37″N 83°51′39.64″W
- Country: United States
- State: Georgia
- County: Hall
- Elevation: 1,112 ft (339 m)
- Time zone: UTC-5 (Eastern (EST))
  - Summer (DST): UTC-4 (EDT)
- ZIP code: 30507, 30542
- Area codes: 770, 470, 678
- GNIS feature ID: 311505

Blackshear Place is an unincorporated community in Hall County, Georgia, United States. The community is located along Georgia State Route 13, 5.7 miles (9.2 km) south of Gainesville. It is in a corridor between Oakwood and Gainesville.

The community was named after General David Blackshear, an American general.
