= Carl Berner =

Carl Berner may refer to:

- Carl Berner (politician) (1841–1918), Norwegian politician
- Carl Berner (rower) (1913–2003), Danish Olympic rower

== See also ==
- Carl Berners plass
- Carl Berners plass (station)
