= Chelsea High School =

Chelsea High School may refer to:

- Chelsea High School (Alabama), Chelsea, Alabama
- Chelsea High School (Massachusetts), Chelsea, Massachusetts
- Chelsea High School (Michigan), Chelsea, Michigan
- Chelsea High School (Oklahoma), Chelsea, Oklahoma
- Chelsea High School (New York), New York, New York
