= Chickasawhatchee Creek =

Stream in Georgia, U.S.

Coordinates: 31°19′12″N 84°29′05″W

Chickasawhatchee Creek is a stream in the U.S. state of Georgia. It is a tributary to the Flint River.

Chickasawhatchee is a name derived from the Hitchiti language, meaning "council house creek". Variant names are "Chicasawhatchie Creek", "Chickasawhachee Creek", "Chickasawhatchie Creek", and "Chickasyhatchy Creek".
