= Chestnutflat, Georgia =

Unincorporated hamlet in Georgia, U.S.

Coordinates: 34.60776°N 85.35324°W

Chestnutflat is an unincorporated area in Walker County, in the U.S. state of Georgia.

== History ==
A variant name is "Chestnut Flat". A post office called Chestnut Flat was established in 1841, and remained in operation until 1904. The community was named for a grove of chestnut trees near the original town site.
