= Arnco Mills, Georgia =

Unincorporated community in Georgia, U.S.

Coordinates: 33°24′53″N 84°51′13″W

Arnco Mills is an unincorporated community in Coweta County, in the U.S. state of Georgia. A variant name is "Arnco".

== History ==
The name "Arnco" is an amalgamation of Arnold and Cole, the surnames of two proprietors of a local cotton mill.
