= Chelsea (drink) =

Low-alcohol carbonated drink

Chelsea was a low-alcohol (0.5%) carbonated drink created by Anheuser-Busch in the late 1970s. It was test-marketed in several American cities, including Peoria, Illinois, Richmond, Virginia, and Springfield, Massachusetts, as the "not so soft drink."

In addition to its alcohol content, Chelsea was also somewhat unusual for its time in that it featured 100% natural flavors. It also had 1/3 less sugar than found in most soft drinks. Another unusual aspect of the product was that it was pasteurized, which allowed it to be promoted as containing no artificial preservatives.

The drink was first announced in June 1978, with Chicago advertising agency Needham, Harper & Steers at the helm of its promotional campaign. It finally launched in selected areas in October of that year.

Even early on, Chelsea ran afoul of anti-alcohol advocates for supposedly whetting teen appetites for alcoholic drinks. The drink, available in 10 oz., 32 oz. glass bottles and 12 oz. aluminum cans, was legal for all ages and tasted like ginger ale with a slightly beerish aftertaste (ingredients included lemon and lime juice, apple flavor, and ginger).

== Addressing the alcohol issue ==
A small brochure explaining Chelsea was included with the 4-pack of 10 oz. bottles. On one page of the brochure the alcohol issue was addressed this way:

"The not so soft drink is not so ordinary...

"The fact is most soft drinks contain a very small amount of alcohol. New Chelsea contains a bit more alcohol than ordinary soft drinks. That's because alcohol is an inherent component of the natural flavors used. But the result is a light blended soft drink, not an alcoholic drink.

"Chelsea fits the U.S. Food and Drug Administration (FDA) Standard of Identity for a soft drink. Furthermore, the U.S. Bureau of Alcohol, Tobacco and Firearms has reviewed Chelsea and determined it to be not under its jurisdiction.

"Finally, studies by a leading independent research consulting company indicate:

' A 150 lb. man would have to consume more than 34 ten ounce bottles (2.6 gallons) in one hour to reach a blood alcohol level considered to be legally under the influence.' (80–100 mg/100 ml in most states)

'...about a gallon of Chelsea (twelve 10 ounce bottles per hour) would have to be ingested by a normal 70 lb. child to produce overt behavioral effects. This volume exceeds the capacity of the stomach.

' With the alcohol in Chelsea at .0.5%, no physiological effect can be expected with typical consumption.

== Reformulation as "The Natural Alternative" ==
In response to the withering criticism for its alcohol content, Chelsea was reformulated in December 1978 to take out the extra alcohol, and re-marketed as "the natural alternative". The bottle's color was changed from clear (which helped display the product's golden color) to green, and the label on both the bottle and the can de-emphasized the Anheuser-Busch name.

Chelsea never went beyond the test markets before a further rollout was cancelled in November 1979.

The Soft Drink Division of Anheuser-Busch later tried its luck with a second soft drink, Root 66, a caffeinated (and non-alcoholic) root beer. It too never got beyond the test market stage.
