= Chelsea College =

Chelsea College may refer to:

- Chelsea College (17th century), a polemical college founded in London in 1609
- Chelsea College of Art and Design
- Chelsea College of Science and Technology, in London
- Chelsea College of Aeronautical and Automobile Engineering, in Shoreham-by-Sea, West Sussex, now part of Greater Brighton Metropolitan College
- Chelsea College of Physical Education, in Eastbourne, East Sussex, now part of the University of Brighton
- Kensington and Chelsea College, in west London
- Royal Hospital Chelsea, on the site of the 17th century college
