= Aonia, Georgia =

Unincorporated community in Georgia, US

Coordinates: 33°40′31″N 82°37′23″W

Aonia is an unincorporated community in Wilkes County, in the U.S. state of Georgia.

== History ==
A post office called Aonia was established in 1843, and remained in operation until 1918. Aonia was located inland away from railroad lines.
