= Antioch, Lee County, Texas =

Ghost town in Texas, US

- Ghost town
- Location in Texas
- Coordinates: 30.27910170°N 96.77525540°W
- Country: United States
- State: Texas
- County: Lee

Antioch is a ghost town in Lee County, Texas, United States. Situated on Farm to Market Road 141, it was a Freedmen's town and the largest African American community in the county. It had an annual Juneteenth celebration. Its school was consolidated by Post Oak in 1953, and was abandoned by the end of the 20th century.
