= Antioch, Trinity County, Texas =

Ghost town in Texas, US

Antioch
- Ghost town
- Location in Texas
- Coordinates: 31.22379490°N 95.05660210°W
- Country: United States
- State: Texas
- County: Trinity

Antioch is a ghost town in Trinity County, Texas, United States. Situated on Farm to Market Road 233, it was established during the Reconstruction era. It had a church and a school—established 1884 for African American children, closing before World War II. It was abandoned by the 1990s.
