= Glasgow smile (disambiguation) =

The Glasgow smile (also known as Chelsea grin), is a form of torture where the victim has their face slashed from each ear down to their mouth.

Glasgow smile, or variations, may also refer to:

- Chelsea Grin, a deathcore band from Salt Lake City, Utah
- "Chelsea Smile" (song), a song from the album Suicide Season by British rock band Bring Me the Horizon
- "Chelsea Smile", a song from the album Season for Assault by 8 Foot Sativa
- The Chelsea Smiles, a hard rock band from Los Angeles, California
