= Colemans Lake, Georgia =

Unincorporated community in Georgia, US

Coordinates: 32°49′16″N 82°16′30″W

Colemans Lake (or, Coleman Lake) is an unincorporated community in Emanuel County, in the U.S. state of Georgia.

== History ==
The Georgia General Assembly incorporated the place in 1953 as the "Town of Coleman's Lake". The town's municipal charter was dissolved in 1995.
