= Antioch, Kentucky =

Unincorporated community in Kentucky, United States

Antioch
- Unincorporated community
- Location within Kentucky
- Coordinates: 38°33′59″N 84°17′34″W
- Country: United States
- State: Kentucky
- County: Harrison County
- Time zone: UTC-5 (Eastern)
  - Summer (DST): UTC-4 (EDT)
- Area code: 859

Antioch is an unincorporated community in Harrison County, Kentucky, in the United States.

== History ==
Antioch once contained a sawmill and a gristmill. A post office called Antioch Mills operated from 1872 until 1904.
