= Chelsea railway station =

Chelsea railway station may refer to:

- Chelsea and Fulham railway station, a former station in London, United Kingdom, which closed in 1940
- Chelsea railway station, Melbourne, a station in Melbourne, Australia
- Two stations in Chelsea, Massachusetts, United States:
  - Bellingham Square station, an existing station formerly known as Chelsea
  - Chelsea station (MBTA), a bus rapid transit and commuter rail station
- King's Road Chelsea railway station, a proposed station in London, United Kingdom
- Michigan Central Railroad Chelsea Depot, a former station in Chelsea, Michigan, United States, which closed in 1982
