= Antioch, Stonewall County, Texas =

Ghost town in Texas, US

Antioch is a ghost town in Stonewall County, Texas, United States. Settled c. 1889, the town had a Baptist church, a WoodmenLife lodge, and a school; it opened in 1897. In 1909, the Stamford and Northwestern Railway was built through nearby Oriana, and most residents moved there, and the community was abandoned afterward.
