= Brent, Georgia =

Unincorporated community in Georgia, U.S.

Coordinates: 32°58′54″N 84°00′37″W

Brent is an unincorporated community in Monroe County, in the U.S. state of Georgia.

== History ==
The community was named after Thomas Y. Brent, an early settler. A post office called Brent was established in 1891, and remained in operation until 1904. A variant name was "Brent Crossroads".
