= Chelsey Brook =

Stream in Minnesota, U.S.

Coordinates: 46°07′36″N 93°11′10″W

Chelsey Brook is a stream in the U.S. state of Minnesota.

Chelsey Brook was named for a lumberman.

== See also ==
- List of rivers of Minnesota
