= Amboy, Georgia =

Unincorporated community in Georgia, U.S.

Coordinates: 31.7924015°N 83.5873883°W

Amboy is an unincorporated community in Turner County, in the U.S. state of Georgia. GNIS spells the name "Armboy".

== History ==
A post office called Amboy was established in 1899, and remained in operation until 1950. The community's name is a transfer from Amboy, New Jersey.
