= Antioch, Troup County, Georgia =

Unincorporated community in Georgia, U.S.

Coordinates: 33°06′27″N 85°10′12″W

Antioch is an unincorporated community in Troup County, in the U.S. state of Georgia.

== History ==
A post office called Antioch was established in 1846, and remained in operation until 1916. In 1900, the community had 58 inhabitants.
