= Beatum, Georgia =

Unincorporated community in Georgia, United States of America

Beatum
- Unincorporated community
- Location in Georgia Location in the United States
- Coordinates: 34°34′45″N 85°08′57″W
- Country: United States
- State: Georgia
- County: Chattooga

Beatum is an unincorporated community in Chattooga County, in the U.S. state of Georgia.

== History ==
A post office called Beatum was established in 1897, and remained in operation until 1927. In 1900, the community had 60 inhabitants.
