= Chelsea, Georgia =

Chelsea
- Unincorporated community
- Location in Georgia Location in the United States
- Coordinates: 34°31′24″N 85°26′25″W
- Country: United States
- State: Georgia
- County: Chattooga

Chelsea is an unincorporated community in Chattooga County, in the U.S. state of Georgia.

== History ==
A post office called Chelsea was established in 1890, and remained in operation until it was discontinued in 1928. The community most likely was named after Chelsea, London.

Little remains of the original community.
