= Burning Bush, Georgia =

Unincorporated community in Georgia, U.S.

Coordinates: 34°53′55″N 85°12′53″W

Burning Bush is an unincorporated community in Catoosa County, in the U.S. state of Georgia.

== Etymology ==
Burning Bush was named after a local church.
