= Monroe County, Georgia =

County in Georgia, United States

- County
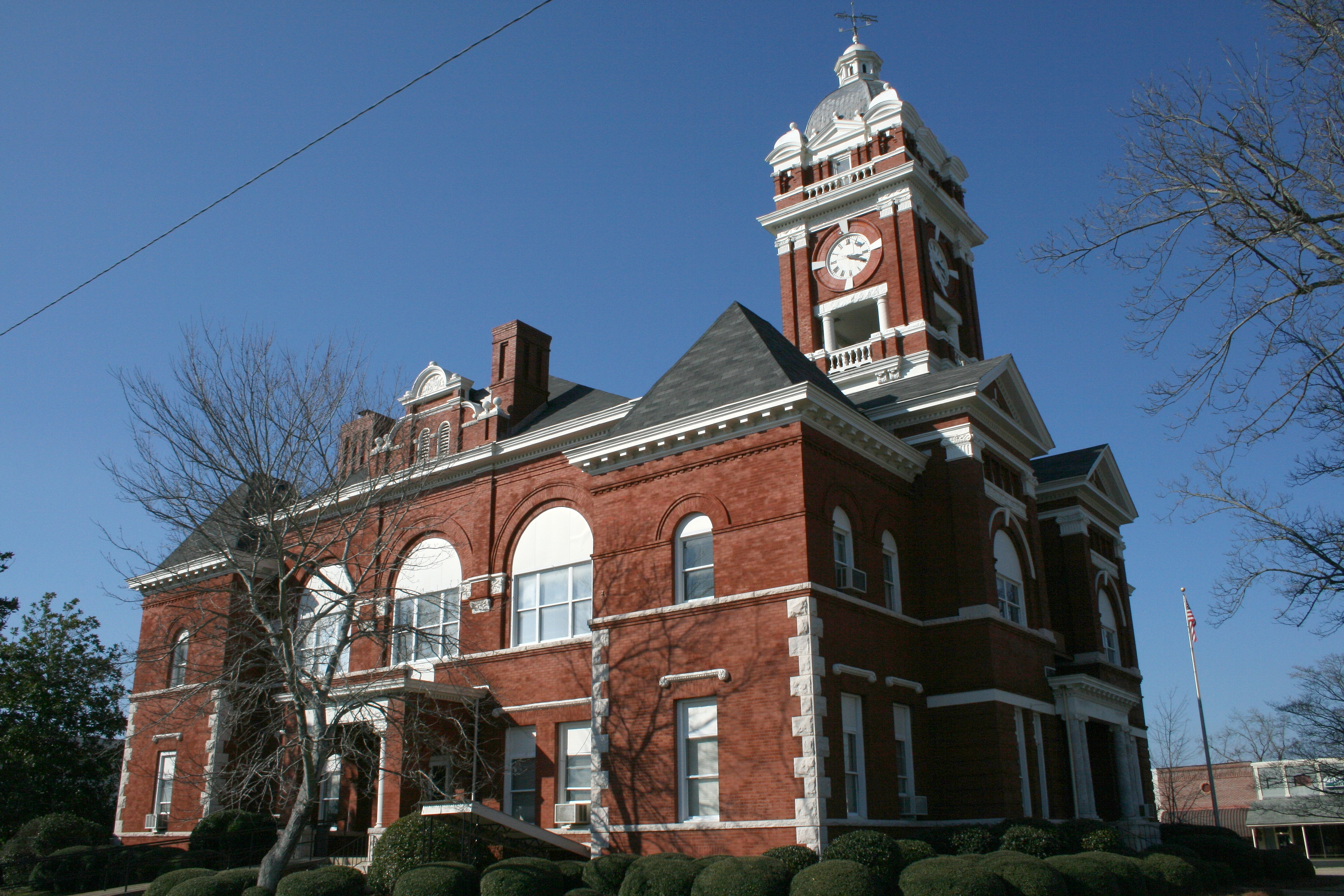
- Monroe County Courthouse in Forsyth

- Location within the U.S. state of Georgia
- Coordinates: 33°01′N 83°55′W
- Country: United States
- State: Georgia
- Founded: 1821; 205 years ago
- Named for: James Monroe
- Seat: Forsyth
- Largest city: Forsyth

Government
  - Commission Chair: Greg Tapley

Area
  - Total: 398 sq mi (1,030 km^{2})
  - Land: 396 sq mi (1,030 km^{2})
  - Water: 2.2 sq mi (5.7 km^{2}) 0.5%

Population (2020)
  - Total: 27,957
  - Estimate (2025): 32,023 ▲
  - Density: 70.6/sq mi (27.3/km^{2})
- Time zone: UTC−5 (Eastern)
  - Summer (DST): UTC−4 (EDT)
- Congressional district: 8th
- Website: www.monroecoga.org

Monroe County is a county located in the central portion of the U.S. state of Georgia. As of the 2020 census, the population was 27,957. The county seat is Forsyth. The county was created on May 15, 1821. The county was named for James Monroe. Monroe County is included in the Macon, Georgia metropolitan area.

== Geography ==
According to the U.S. Census Bureau, the county has a total area of 398 square miles (1,030 km^{2}), of which 396 square miles (1,030 km^{2}) is land and 2.2 square miles (5.7 km^{2}) (0.5%) is water. Located on the fall line, the county falls in between the Piedmont and the Atlantic coastal plain. The vast majority of Monroe County is located in the Upper Ocmulgee River sub-basin of the Altamaha River basin, with just a tiny southwestern corner of the county, west of a line between Yatesville and Culloden, located in the Upper Flint River sub-basin of the ACF River Basin (Apalachicola-Chattahoochee-Flint River Basin).

=== Major highways ===
- Interstate 75 / State Route 401 (unsigned)
- Interstate 475 / State Route 408 (unsigned)
- U.S. Route 23 / State Route 87
- U.S. Route 41
- U.S. Route 341 / State Route 7
- State Route 18
- State Route 19
- State Route 42
- State Route 74
- State Route 83

=== Adjacent counties ===
- Butts County (north)
- Jasper County (northeast)
- Jones County (east)
- Bibb County (southeast)
- Crawford County (south)
- Upson County (southwest)
- Lamar County (west)

== Communities ==
=== Cities ===
- Culloden
- Forsyth

=== Census-designated places ===
- Bolingbroke
- Juliette
- Smarr

=== Unincorporated communities ===
- Berner
- Blount
- Brent
- High Falls
- Russellville
- Strouds

== Demographics ==
Historical population
Census	Pop.	Note	%±
1830	16,202		—
1840	16,275		0.5%
1850	16,985		4.4%
1860	15,953		−6.1%
1870	17,213		7.9%
1880	18,808		9.3%
1890	19,137		1.7%
1900	20,682		8.1%
1910	20,450		−1.1%
1920	20,138		−1.5%
1930	11,606		−42.4%
1940	10,749		−7.4%
1950	10,523		−2.1%
1960	10,495		−0.3%
1970	10,991		4.7%
1980	14,610		32.9%
1990	17,113		17.1%
2000	21,757		27.1%
2010	26,424		21.5%
2020	27,957		5.8%
2025 (est.)	32,023	▲	14.5%
U.S. Decennial Census; 1790-1880 1890-1910; 1920-1930 1930-1940; 1940-1950 1960-1980; 1980-2000 2010 2020

=== Racial and ethnic composition ===
Monroe County, Georgia – Racial and ethnic composition Note: the US Census treats Hispanic/Latino as an ethnic category. This table excludes Latinos from the racial categories and assigns them to a separate category. Hispanics/Latinos may be of any race.
Race / Ethnicity (NH = Non-Hispanic)	Pop 1980	Pop 1990	Pop 2000	Pop 2010	Pop 2020	% 1980	% 1990	% 2000	% 2010	% 2020
White alone (NH)	9,012	11,554	15,150	19,101	19,954	61.68%	67.52%	69.63%	72.29%	71.37%
Black or African American alone (NH)	5,386	5,390	6,015	6,249	6,084	36.87%	31.50%	27.65%	23.65%	21.76%
Native American or Alaska Native alone (NH)	17	36	67	64	34	0.12%	0.21%	0.31%	0.24%	0.12%
Asian alone (NH)	20	36	74	209	239	0.14%	0.21%	0.34%	0.79%	0.85%
Native Hawaiian or Pacific Islander alone (NH)	x	x	6	4	0	x	x	0.03%	0.02%	0.00%
Other race alone (NH)	2	1	6	14	86	0.01%	0.01%	0.03%	0.05%	0.31%
Mixed race or Multiracial (NH)	x	x	158	248	846	x	x	0.73%	0.94%	3.03%
Hispanic or Latino (any race)	173	96	281	535	714	1.18%	0.56%	1.29%	2.02%	2.55%
Total	14,610	17,113	21,757	26,424	27,957	100.00%	100.00%	100.00%	100.00%	100.00%

=== 2020 census ===
As of the 2020 census, there were 27,957 people, 10,257 households, and 6,179 families residing in the county. The median age was 43.2 years, 21.6% of residents were under the age of 18 and 19.4% of residents were 65 years of age or older. For every 100 females there were 100.9 males, and for every 100 females age 18 and over there were 99.7 males age 18 and over. 18.2% of residents lived in urban areas, while 81.8% lived in rural areas.

The racial makeup of the county was 72.0% White, 21.9% Black or African American, 0.2% American Indian and Alaska Native, 0.9% Asian, 0.0% Native Hawaiian and Pacific Islander, 1.1% from some other race, and 4.0% from two or more races. Hispanic or Latino residents of any race comprised 2.6% of the population.

Of the 10,257 households, 31.8% had children under the age of 18 living with them and 25.3% had a female householder with no spouse or partner present. About 22.7% of all households were made up of individuals and 11.1% had someone living alone who was 65 years of age or older.

There were 11,085 housing units, of which 7.5% were vacant. Among occupied housing units, 79.2% were owner-occupied and 20.8% were renter-occupied. The homeowner vacancy rate was 1.0% and the rental vacancy rate was 7.5%.

== Politics ==
As of the 2020s, Monroe County is a strongly Republican voting county, voting 73% for Donald Trump in 2024. For elections to the United States House of Representatives, Monroe County is part of Georgia's 8th congressional district, currently represented by Austin Scott. For elections to the Georgia State Senate, Monroe County is part of District 18. For elections to the Georgia House of Representatives, Monroe County is part of districts 118, 144 and 145.

United States presidential election results for Monroe County, Georgia
Year	Republican		Democratic		Third party(ies)	
Year	No.	%	No.	%	No.	%
1912	50	6.49%	702	91.17%	18	2.34%
1916	65	7.76%	721	86.04%	52	6.21%
1920	83	9.02%	837	90.98%	0	0.00%
1924	64	8.34%	672	87.61%	31	4.04%
1928	329	29.12%	801	70.88%	0	0.00%
1932	45	3.61%	1,200	96.31%	1	0.08%
1936	147	10.27%	1,277	89.24%	7	0.49%
1940	49	4.58%	1,014	94.86%	6	0.56%
1944	410	26.59%	1,132	73.41%	0	0.00%
1948	169	11.90%	881	62.04%	370	26.06%
1952	501	17.23%	2,406	82.77%	0	0.00%
1956	506	24.67%	1,545	75.33%	0	0.00%
1960	581	26.14%	1,642	73.86%	0	0.00%
1964	1,665	51.33%	1,578	48.64%	1	0.03%
1968	770	23.91%	1,028	31.93%	1,422	44.16%
1972	2,181	73.43%	789	26.57%	0	0.00%
1976	1,078	26.68%	2,962	73.32%	0	0.00%
1980	1,242	32.18%	2,542	65.85%	76	1.97%
1984	2,420	52.51%	2,189	47.49%	0	0.00%
1988	2,570	56.38%	1,970	43.22%	18	0.39%
1992	2,423	39.28%	2,774	44.97%	971	15.74%
1996	3,054	48.19%	2,768	43.67%	516	8.14%
2000	4,561	60.48%	2,839	37.65%	141	1.87%
2004	6,522	66.59%	3,216	32.84%	56	0.57%
2008	7,933	65.31%	4,106	33.80%	108	0.89%
2012	8,361	68.00%	3,785	30.78%	149	1.21%
2016	8,832	69.61%	3,571	28.15%	284	2.24%
2020	11,057	70.91%	4,385	28.12%	150	0.96%
2024	12,954	73.17%	4,689	26.49%	61	0.34%

United States Senate election results for Monroe County, Georgia2
Year	Republican		Democratic		Third party(ies)	
Year	No.	%	No.	%	No.	%
2020	10,929	70.84%	4,205	27.26%	294	1.91%
2020	10,084	71.46%	4,027	28.54%	0	0.00%

United States Senate election results for Monroe County, Georgia3
Year	Republican		Democratic		Third party(ies)	
Year	No.	%	No.	%	No.	%
2020	6,077	39.60%	3,197	20.83%	6,071	39.56%
2020	10,057	71.25%	4,058	28.75%	0	0.00%
2022	9,673	70.79%	3,737	27.35%	255	1.87%
2022	9,018	71.42%	3,609	28.58%	0	0.00%

Georgia Gubernatorial election results for Monroe County
Year	Republican		Democratic		Third party(ies)	
Year	No.	%	No.	%	No.	%
2022	10,314	75.19%	3,315	24.17%	89	0.65%

== Education ==
All parts of the county are in the Monroe County School District.

== See also ==
- National Register of Historic Places listings in Monroe County, Georgia
- List of counties in Georgia
