= Cooksville, Georgia =

Unincorporated community in Georgia, US

Coordinates: 33°14′21″N 84°59′52″W

Cooksville is an unincorporated community in Heard County, in the U.S. state of Georgia.

== History ==
A variant name was "Saint Cloud". A post office called Cooksville operated from 1872 until 1927. J. D. Cook, an early postmaster, gave the community his last name.
