= Chastain, Georgia =

Unincorporated community in Georgia, U.S.

Coordinates: 31°01′58″N 83°55′50″W

Chastain is an unincorporated community in Thomas County, in the U.S. state of Georgia.

== History ==
A post office called Chastain was established in 1880, and remained in operation until 1907. The community was named after one or more early settlers with the surname Chastain.
