= Crowville, Georgia =

Unincorporated community in Georgia, U.S.

Coordinates: 34°02′41″N 84°46′33″W

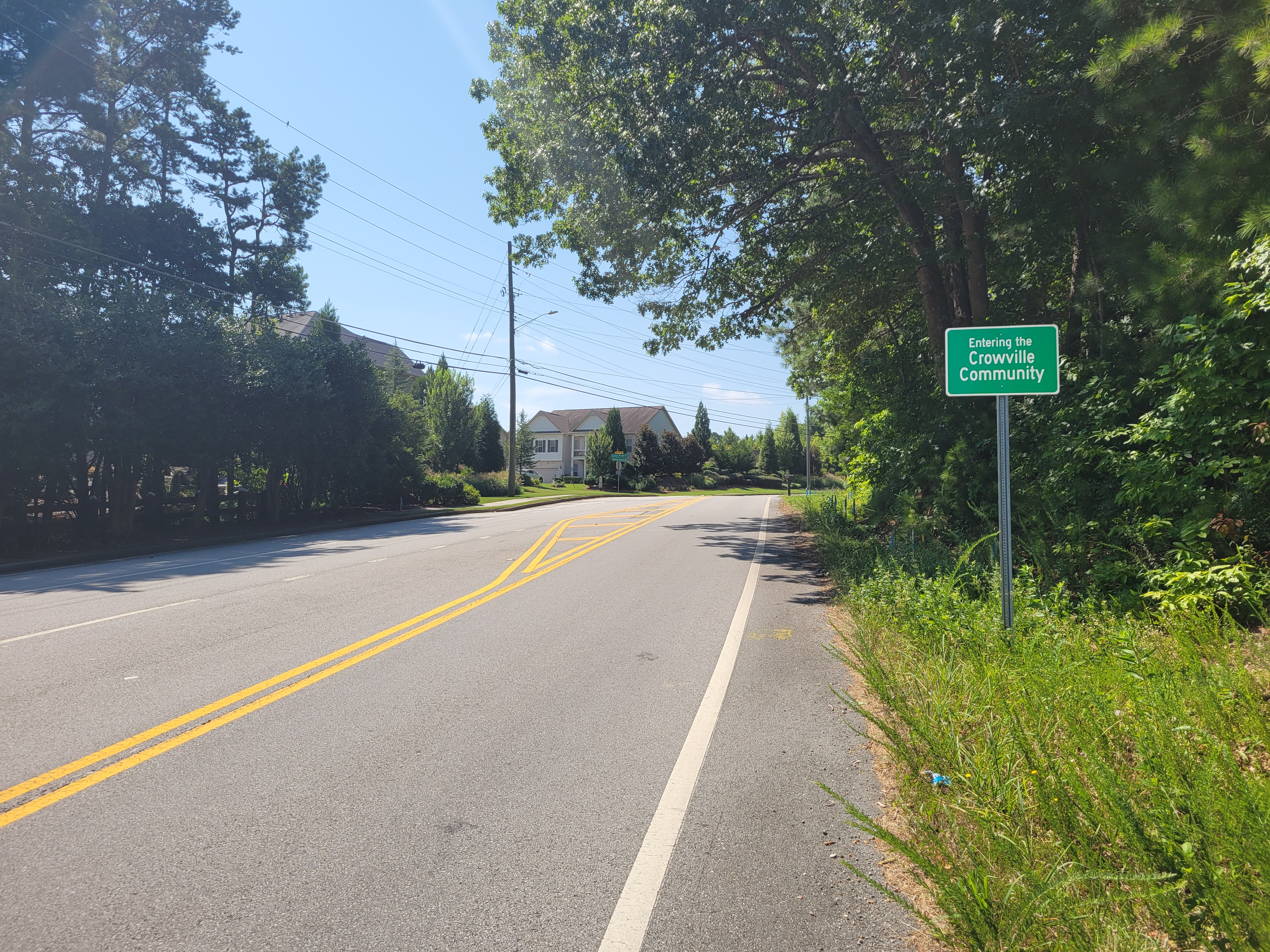
Entering the Crowville Community

Crowville is an unincorporated community in Paulding County, in the U.S. state of Georgia.

== History ==
A variant name was "Crowsville". A post office called Crowsville was established in 1891, and remained in operation until 1908. The community was named after Willis M. Crowe, a local merchant.
