= Berner, Georgia =

Unincorporated community in Georgia, U.S.

Coordinates: 33°09′17″N 83°49′43″W

Berner is an unincorporated community in Monroe County, in the U.S. state of Georgia.

== History ==
A variant name was "Frankville". The present name is after one Colonel Bob Berner. A post office called Frankville was established in 1882, the name was changed to Berner in 1896, and the post office closed in 1957. The community had a depot on the Atlanta, Macon and Brunswick division of the Southern Railroad.
