= Antioch, Polk County, Georgia =

Unincorporated community in Georgia, U.S.

Coordinates: 33°57′12″N 85°09′41″W

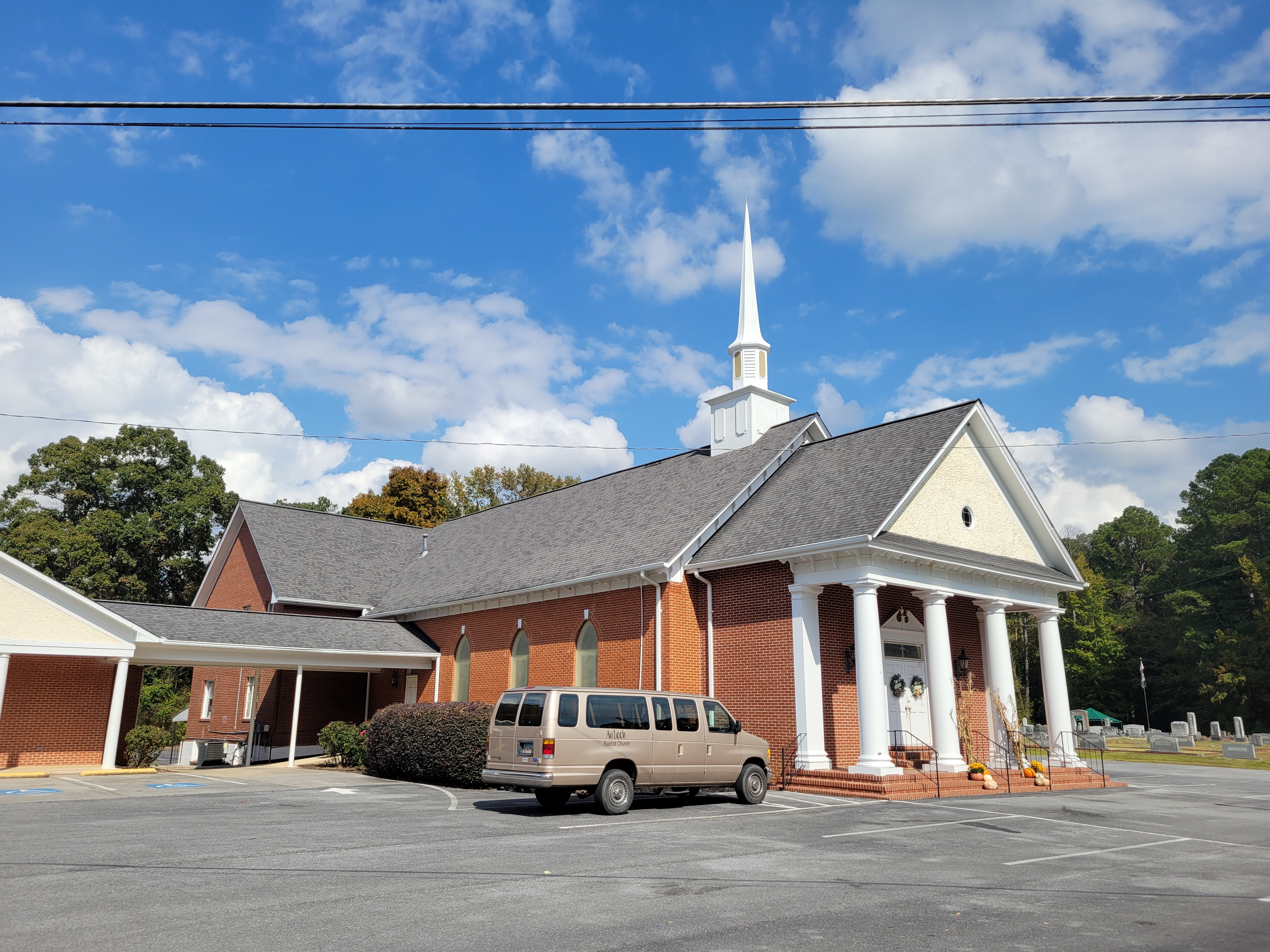
Antioch Baptist Church

Antioch is an unincorporated community in Polk County, in the U.S. state of Georgia.

== History ==
The community took its name from the Antioch Baptist Church, founded there in the 1840s.
