= Brownwood, Morgan County, Georgia =

Unincorporated community in Georgia, U.S.

Coordinates: 33°33′41″N 83°33′21″W

Brownwood is an unincorporated community in Morgan County, in the U.S. state of Georgia.

== History ==
The community was named after James Neville Brown, a local landholder.
