= Arkwright, Georgia =

Unincorporated community in Georgia, U.S.

Arkwright
- Unincorporated community
- Location within Georgia
- Coordinates: 32°55′58″N 83°42′11″W
- Country: United States
- State: Georgia
- County: Bibb
- Elevation: 108 m (354 ft)
- Time zone: UTC-5 (EST)
  - Summer (DST): UTC-4 (EDT)
- ZIP code: 31210
- Area code: 478

Arkwright is an unincorporated community in Bibb County, in the U.S. state of Georgia.

== History ==
The community was named after Preston S. Arkwright, an electric utilities official, and the founder of Georgia Railway and Power Company. An early variant name was "Holton".

In 1890, Capt. Robert Emory Park of Macon, Georgia built Park Memorial United Methodist Church in Holton community, in memory of his wife.

== Power Plant ==
Georgia Power operated a coal-fired power station in the community called Plant Arkwright, beginning in 1941 until it was closed in 2002. Over the next year, much of the plant infrastructure was demolished, including the 600 foot tall smokestack.

In 2026, Georgia Power announced they were going to move two million tons of coal ash from retention ponds at the old plant site to more environmentally secure storage and recycling.
