= National Register of Historic Places listings in Terrell County, Georgia =

Location of Terrell County in Georgia

This is a list of properties and districts in Terrell County, Georgia that are listed on the U.S. National Register of Historic Places (NRHP).

This National Park Service list is complete through NPS recent listings posted March 21, 2025.

== Current listings ==
	Name on the Register	Image	Date listed	Location	City or town	Description
1	Bronwood Calaboose		June 22, 1982 (#82002483)	GA 118; 31°49′54″N 84°21′46″W	Bronwood	
2	Dawson Historic District	Dawson Historic District	September 4, 1997 (#97001090)	Roughly bounded by US 82, Pecan St., Seaboard Airline RR tracks, Crawford St., Thirteenth Ave., and Cent. of GA RR track 31°46′25″N 84°26′25″W	Dawson	
3	Martin Elementary School		May 12, 2008 (#08000397)	608 Church St. 31°49′32″N 84°21′30″W	Bronwood	
4	Parrott Historic District	Parrott Historic District	May 26, 2004 (#04000528)	Roughly centered on the jct. of Main St. and GA Hwy 55/GA Hwy 520; 31°53′33″N 84°30′36″W	Parrott	
5	Sasser Commercial Historic District	Sasser Commercial Historic District	August 18, 1983 (#83000243)	Address Restricted; 31°43′12″N 84°20′52″W	Sasser	
6	Terrell County Courthouse	Terrell County Courthouse	September 18, 1980 (#80001244)	E. Lee St. 31°46′23″N 84°26′45″W	Dawson	

== Former listings ==
	Name on the Register	Image	Date listed	Date removed	Location	City or town	Description
1	Dawson Woman's Clubhouse	Dawson Woman's Clubhouse	June 17, 1982 (#82002484)	October 31, 2019	360 6th Ave., NE, but moved to the corner of 7th Ave and Stonewall in October 2017; 31°46′32″N 84°26′44″W	Dawson	Log cabin structure built for public purpose, of the local Woman's Club. Delisted because it was moved to a nearby location.
