= Albany metropolitan area, Georgia =

Albany metropolitan area
- Metropolitan statistical area
- Albany, Ga, metropolitan statistical area
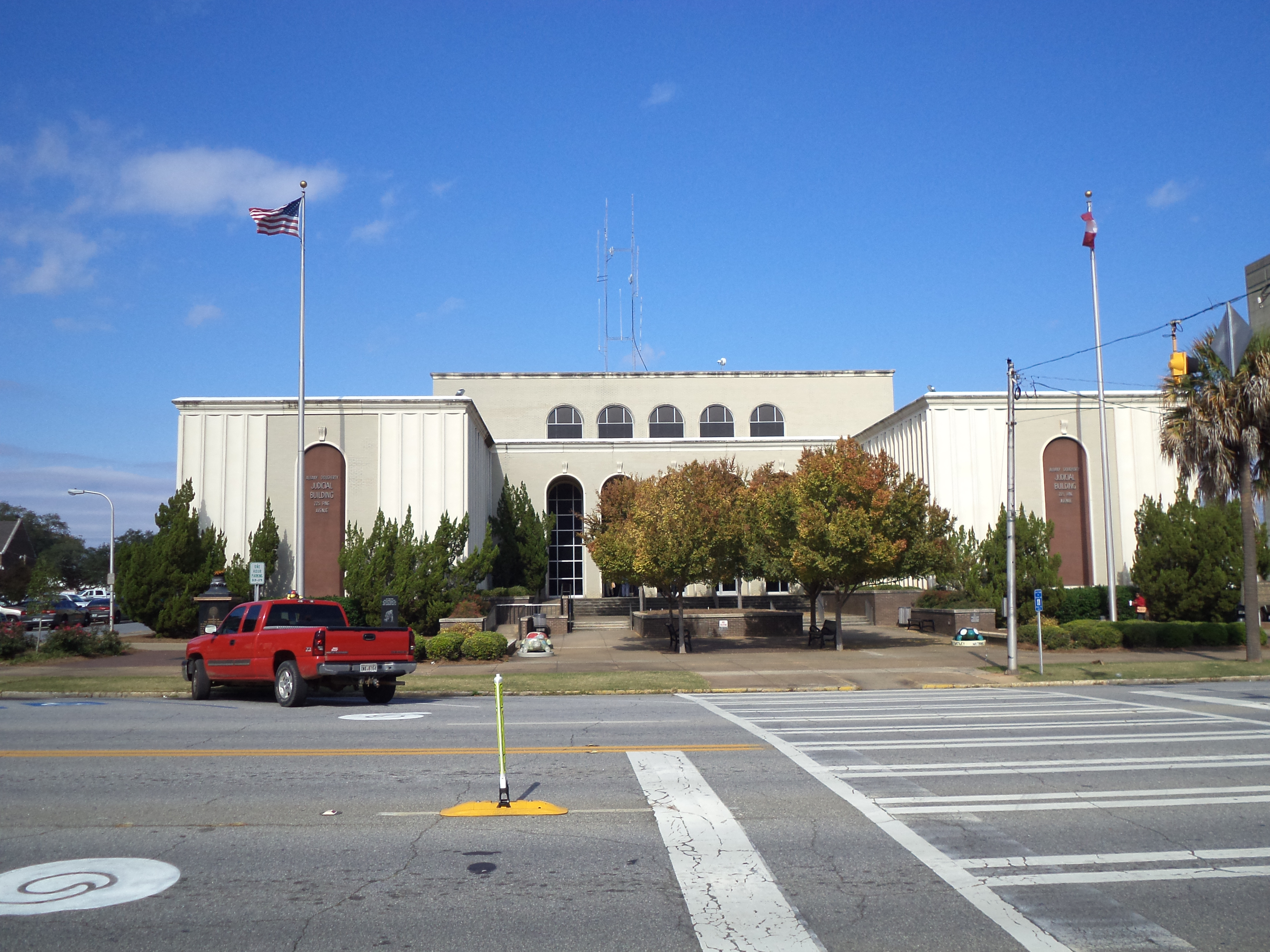
- Dougherty Judicial Building
- Interactive map of Albany metropolitan area
- Country: United States
- State: Georgia
- Largest city: Albany

Area
  - Total: 1,591 sq mi (4,120 km^{2})

Population (2023)
  - Total: 145,508
  - Density: 92/sq mi (36/km^{2})
- Time zone: UTC-5 (CST)
  - Summer (DST): UTC-4 (CDT)
- Area code: 229

The Albany metropolitan area, officially the Albany metropolitan statistical area, as defined by the United States Census Bureau and U.S. Office of Management and Budget, is a metropolitan statistical area consisting of five counties in the U.S. state of Georgia: Baker, Dougherty, Lee, Terrell, and Worth. Located in within the region of Southwest Georgia, the metropolitan area had a 2023 census-estimated population of 145,508.

== Geography ==
The Albany MSA is located in southern Georgia, and consists of the following counties: Baker, Dougherty, Lee, Terrell, and Worth.

=== Communities ===
==== Places with more than 10,000 inhabitants ====
- Albany

==== Places with 1,000 to 10,000 inhabitants ====
- Dawson
- Leesburg
- Putney
- Sylvester

==== Places with 500 to 1,000 inhabitants ====
- Bronwood
- Poulan
- Smithville

==== Places with less than 500 inhabitants ====
- Parrott
- Sasser
- Sumner
- Warwick

==== Unincorporated communities ====
- Acree
- Oakfield
- Pecan City
- Pretoria
- Radium Springs

== Demographics ==
According to the 2000 United States census, there were 157,833 people, 57,403 households, and 41,206 families residing within the MSA. In 2020, the Albany metropolitan area had a population of 148,922, although at the 2022 U.S. census estimates, its resident population declined to 146,387.

In 2000, the racial makeup of the MSA was 49.33% White, 48.66% African American, 0.25% Native American, 0.54% Asian, 0.02% Pacific Islander, 0.50% from other races, and 0.70% from two or more races. Hispanic or Latinos of any race were 1.32% of the population. In 2022, the American Community Survey estimated its racial composition was 39% White, 52% African American, 1% Asian, 3% two or more races, and 3% Hispanic or Latino of any race. While its population declined from 2000 to 2020, its demographic makeup followed nationwide trends of greater diversification, and the growth of the Hispanic or Latino American community. Historically, the MSA has been considered part of the Black Belt in the American South.

In 2000, the median income for a household in the MSA was $33,845, and the median income for a family was $39,361. Males had a median income of $31,094 versus $21,055 for females. The per capita income for the MSA was $16,652. By 2022, its median household income was $48,376 with a per capita income of $26,045. An estimated 26.2% of the population lived at or below the poverty line. Among the metropolitan population in 2022, 28% earned from $50,000-$100,000 annually, and the median value of an owner-occupied housing unit was $141,700.

== Transportation ==
=== Air ===
- Southwest Georgia Regional Airport

=== Highways ===
- U.S. Route 19
- U.S. Route 82

== See also ==
- Georgia statistical areas
- List of municipalities in Georgia (U.S. state)
