= Terrell County School District =

School district in Georgia (U.S. state)

Address
- 721 1st Avenue SE Dawson, Georgia, 39842-2144; United States
- Coordinates: 31.761099°N 84.436143°W

District information
- Grades: Pre-school - 12
- Superintendent: Robert Aaron
- Accreditations: Southern Association of Colleges and Schools; Georgia Accrediting Commission

Students and staff
- Enrollment: 1,764
- Faculty: 98

Other information
- Telephone: (229) 995-4425
- Fax: (229) 995-4632
- Website: www.terrell.k12.ga.us

The Terrell County School District is a public school district in Terrell County, Georgia, United States, based in Dawson. It serves the communities of Bronwood, Dawson, Parrott, and Sasser.

== Schools ==
The Terrell County School District has one primary school, one elementary school, one middle school and one high school.

=== Primary school ===
- Lillie Cooper Primary School

=== Elementary school ===
- Carver Elementary School

=== Middle school ===
- Terrell Middle School

=== High school ===
- Terrell High School
