= Dawson Five =

Group of defendants charged with murder

- Date: January 22, 1976
- Location: Dawson Terrell County, Georgia
- Also known as: Dawson 5, The Dawson Five
- Deaths: Gordon B. Howell Jr.
- Suspects: 5
- Accused: Roosevelt Watson; Henderson Watson; J.D. Davenport; Johnnie B. Jackson; George Poor
- Charges: Murder
- Verdict: Charges dropped (did not go to trial)

The Dawson Five were defendants in a criminal court case in Dawson, Georgia, where they were charged with the murder of a white customer in a roadside convenience store. The five young black men, one of whom was a juvenile, became known as "The Dawson Five": Roosevelt Watson, Henderson Watson, J. D. Davenport, Johnnie B. Jackson, and George Poor.

On January 22, 1976, Gordon B. Howell Jr. was shot during a robbery of Tiny's Grocery, located at Bridges Crossroads near Dawson. On December 19, 1977, after over a year of imprisonment, time in the national spotlight, and contentious pretrial hearings; District Attorney John Irwin announced that he was dropping all charges against the five defendants, after a ruling by the presiding Judge Geer that voided Roosevelt Watson's forced confession. The court dropped the charges after finding evidence of police misconduct, including coerced confessions, intimidation, and improper identification procedures.

== Murder of Gordon B. Howell Jr. ==
On January 22, 1976, in mid-morning, store owner Tiny Denton testified that Gordon "Bubba" Howell, a white male customer in his small roadside general store, Tiny's Grocery, located in the outskirts of Dawson, was shot and killed during an armed robbery by five black youths. Howell, a farm manager and horseman from Lee County, often stopped at Tiny's for cigarettes while traveling through rural Terrell County on State Highway 32. He bought two cartons that morning. Tiny later testified that Howell paid for the cigarettes and asked him to order a box of tangelos.

A little after 10 a.m., unknown assailant/s robbed Tiny's Grocery of $150 and put a gun to the back of Gordon Howell's head and pulled the trigger. Howell, 61, died later that day at an Albany Hospital. According to Tiny, the assailants wielded a .38-caliber Saturday night special. The assailant/s also cleaned out Howell's pockets, speeding away in his truck before abandoning it at a pond less than a mile away. The murder weapon was never recovered.

== Arrests and investigation ==
=== Arrest of five youths ===
Tiny Denton told the Dawson police that he recognized one of the youths that allegedly committed the hold-up murder. Denton identified Howell's killer as Roosevelt Watson, 19, a young man who lived with his mother in a rickety house near Denton's store at Georgia Highway 32 and Callis Road, six miles east of Dawson. Denton told investigators from the Terrell County Sheriff's Office and the Georgia Bureau of Investigation that he identified Watson as one of four black men in dark clothing who entered his store after Howell did. Denton testified that he looked up and they had pulled ski masks over their faces.

The young Watson was promptly taken into custody by the sheriffs department and an agent of the GBI. Under interrogation thirty miles away at police headquarters in Americus, Watson gave a forced confession under threats of violence, admitting to the shooting and implicated four others-his older brother, Henderson, 21, a cousin, J. D. Davenport, 18, and two friends, James ("Junior") Jackson, 17, and his brother, Johnny, 18.

On Feb. 1, 1976, the Dawson Five were charged with robbery and murder. Despite Watson's confession, the youths claimed they were innocent. Denying the coerced confession, the five claimed to be carrying water from a well half a mile away to the Watson home when the robbery and slaying occurred.

=== Seeking the death penalty ===
Based primarily on Denton's eyewitness account, a partial palm print removed from the hood of Howell's truck, the forced confession by Roosevelt Watson and the forced confessions from the others, District Attorney John Irwin and special prosecutor Michael Stoddard sought the death penalty for all five of the accused.

=== Forced confessions ===
The Dawson Five case took place in the volatile post-civil rights era racial climate of Dawson. The racial tension in the community, paired with the racial break down of the criminal accusations, put pressure on the police force to satisfy the community demands that the killer be found. Dawson is the county seat of Terrell County, a county labeled "Terrible Terrell" by the SNCC in the 1960s for the county's racist law enforcement practices.

Roosevelt Watson claimed that police had threatened to electrocute and castrate him. William M. Rucker, a former police officer, testified he witnessed threats of physical violence made by Deputy Jack Hammack in an effort to obtain a confession from Watson. Once out on $100,000 bail and after serving nine months in jail, Watson told reporters that the police "told me they gonna put me in the electric chair ... They had these two things hooked up to my fingers. Had a thing on my arm, real tight. Said they gonna electrocute me if I didn't tell 'em." It was only later that Watson learned he was merely undergoing polygraph testing. The GBI investigator admitted that during Watson's interrogation "there was talk of electrocution." Additionally, James Jackson claimed he gave a false confession only after Terrell County Sheriff's Deputy Hammack put a gun to his head demanding he corroborate Watson's confession.

== Media attention ==
The case quickly garnered national attention as it occurred within days of the January, 1977 inauguration of President Jimmy Carter, the former governor of Georgia." Since the crime occurred only twenty miles south of Plains, Georgia, Jimmy Carter's hometown, the national media quickly focused on the case to point out the paradoxes of the "new South." During his campaign, Carter, the first President from the Deep South since before the Civil War and a peanut farmer, received support from the southern black leadership from the Civil Rights Movement. The Dawson Five case potentially complicated Carter's desire to show the nation that Georgia was ready to share the national consensus on racial equality. On his doorstep, a story was unfolding that harkened back to the very worst days of Georgia's ugly past, a land bloody with five hundred blacks lynched since Reconstruction. To further complicate matters, the death penalty statute under which the Dawson Five were to be tried had been signed into law on March 28, 1973 by Governor Jimmy Carter. Dawson was on the threshold of notoriety because of the arrest and impending capital trial of the Dawson Five.

On April 21st 1977, The New York Times ran a Sunday piece on the Dawson Five case under the title: "A Case of Murder; a Charge of Forced Confessions."

=== Life and Death: Dawson, Georgia ===
In July, 1977 the Public Broadcasting Service (PBS) began airing a documentary called "Life and Death: Dawson, Georgia" a half-hour film about the Dawson Five and the racial climate of Terrell County. The film, produced by Andrew Dintenfass and Ron Kanter, played nationally, increasing the national exposure of the case. The documentary interviewed a swath of people from Dawson about the case, including the Dawson Five, the mayor of Dawson Jimmy Raines, the headmaster at Terrell Academy, and Officer William M. Rucker who describes on camera witnessing Deputy Jack Hammack point a gun at one of the defendants to force a confession. The archival master of Life and Death: Dawson, Georgia is in the Walter J. Brown Media Archives & Peabody Awards Collection at the University of Georgia.

== Legal defense ==
=== Defense team ===
The Dawson Five were represented by a local attorney during the preliminary hearing before efforts were made to interest the Montgomery, Alabama-based Southern Poverty Law Center (SPLC), a legal aid and civil rights organization, in taking over the defense of the five poor prisoners. In fall and winter 1976, the SPLC retained Atlanta-based Project Team Defense for the five defendants. Millard Farmer, a lawyer who had earned a reputation for defending African-Americans in racially charged cases, took the lead defense role. In one of the local Georgia newspapers, Farmer was described as "the most controversial lawyer in Georgia" because of the novel trial tactics he pioneered in capital cases. Farmer collaborated on this trial strategy with social psychologist Courtney Mullin, 37, white, from Raleigh, North Carolina, "a hippy-looking girl without the hippy mind", as one observer put it. Mullien focused her talents on forensic psychology and was well-known for her work on jury selection process during the 1975 case of Joan Little. The SPLC adopted the case and made it the focus of mass mailings, similar to the successful approach it used in the fund‐raising campaign to defend Little in North Carolina.

In addition to Farmer and Mullin, Project Team Defense was composed of other lawyers and social scientists. The group set out to use relatively new trial techniques in efforts to avoid executions, including: "Appealing to logic rather than compassion in arguments against the death penalty; prolonging trials to allow jurors to become well acquainted with defendants; using a proliferation of motions to 'capture the atmosphere of the trial' for appeal, if necessary; using social scientists to assist in challenging the composition of jury pools and evaluating the character of prospective jurors." Completing the defense staff in the Dawson Five case were the assistants, four men and eight women; seven of the twelve black, several students on leave or on vacation from their studies in college or law school; as well as a couple of other social activists.

By summer 1977, a year and a half after the crime and the arrest of the Dawson Five, the defense team had been working on the case for many months, challenging the accusations in both the legal courtroom and the court of public opinion. The defense attorneys publicly charged that their clients were innocent and confessed under coercion and physical threats from law enforcement officers. The defense helped raise bail money to get the defendants out on bail. They challenged the racial composition of the jury lists, delaying the start of the trial. This was part of Farmer's strategy to inundate the Terrell County court with pre-trial motions. Additionally, they helped to spread publicity for the case, including cooperating with a film crew from Boston's WGBH that was making a documentary for television on the case. PBS began airing Life and Death: Dawson, Ga in July 1977. The 25-minute documentary received national coverage, fueling the continued national interest in the case.

=== Pre-trial ===
==== Claims of innocence ====
At the preliminary hearing, Roosevelt Watson rejected his confession, claiming that it was coerced. Neither he nor any of his co-defendants were willing to sign a confession.

==== Pre-trial arguments and motions ====
Millard Farmer focused some of his numerous pre-trail motions on the racial disparity in juror pools in Terrell County. Farmer argued that in Terrell County, and other rural districts like it in the Deep South, small-town, usually all-white, juries tried and convicted black men of first-degree murder and, especially if the victim was white, sentenced them to death at an unjustly high rate. Farmer argued that such results were virtually guaranteed by the exclusion of blacks from the jury pool. In Terrell, in 1976, the population was about 60% black; however, the jury pool was 74% white. This racial imbalance was the target for the first of the many pre-trial motions on behalf of the Dawson Five, and in April 1977 it succeeded in obtaining a new jury pool with equal black and white members.

The defense aimed to put capital punishment on trial through the case of the Dawson Five. The defense aimed to turn the case from one in which five innocent black teenagers were on trial for their lives into a case in which the town of Dawson and Terrell County and their long history of manifest racism, and Georgia's newly-minted death penalty statutes were on trial in every household of the nation that could be reached by newspaper and television.

The pre-trial arguments brought national media attention to Dawson. The arguments took place over nine days in early August 1977. Presiding over the case was Judge Walter I. Geer, who was not in the best of health, as was soon to be evident. Within a few weeks he would retire from the case due to heath reasons; however, his retirement from the case would only be temporarily, as he would return in November to hear the conclusion of the case. Representing the prosecution was another elderly white man, District Attorney John R. Irwin, accompanied by Michael Stoddard, an Assistant Attorney General sent from Atlanta as a special prosecutor to assist the district attorney.

August 1, 1977 – In a surprise move, special prosecutor Michael Stoddard announced the state would not seek the death penalty.

Aug. 2, 1977 – William M. Rucker, a former Dawson police officer, testified to seeing Terrell County Deputy Sheriff Jack Hammack point his gun at James E. Jackson Jr. He also testified about unchecked harassment of black people by white law officers in Terrell County.

Aug. 4, 1977 – James E. Jackson Jr. testified that he confessed only because Hammack threatened to kill him if he did not reveal the location of the murder weapon. Additionally, defense attorneys questioned area ministers of white churches and a white private school principal about excluding black people to further depict the racially divided climate of Dawson.

Aug. 5, 1977 – Roosevelt Watson testified that he admitted shooting Howell because officers threatened him with electrocution, castration and execution if he did not confess to the murder.

Aug. 8, 1977 – The prosecutors called upon Dawson Public Safety Director Phil Law to challenge previous testimony detailing police prejudices against black people.

Aug. 9, 1977 – Deputy Hammack denied Jackson's claims that the deputy pointed a gun at him and threatened to shoot him.

Aug. 10, 1977 – A former Georgia Bureau of Investigation agent testified that he "forgot" to report Denton's identification of Roosevelt Watson as the triggerman until three days after the murder. He also testified that two of the Dawson Five declared Watson as the killer, and that Watson confessed when confronted with their claims.

Aug. 11, 1977 – Judge Walter Geer ended pretrial arguments to consider defense motions challenging the indictments and evidence against the Dawson Five.

==== Evidence ====
The evidence against the Dawson Five rested mainly on the alleged statements from Watson implicating the others, and similar statements by the others implicating each other; as well as Tiny Denton's identification of Watson as the triggerman. No physical evidence, such as the murder weapon, fingerprints, or the stolen money, linked any of the defendants to the crime.

==== Jury selection and judge change ====
Aug. 16, 1977 – After five days of deliberations, Geer set an August 29 trial date. Irwin and Stoddard planned to try the Dawson Five separately, starting with the trial of alleged triggerman Roosevelt Watson.

Aug. 23, 1977 – Citing poor health, Geer withdrew himself from hearing the Dawson Five case. Second District Administrative Judge Marcus Calhoun appointed Dougherty Superior Court Judge Leonard Farkas to the case in Geer's absence.

Aug. 29, 1977 – Farkas presided over what was scheduled to be a day of jury selection in State v. Roosevelt Watson; however, he dismissed potential jurors and heard arguments to suppress Watson's confession instead. Millard Farmer presented an extended discourse on the case and the current prejudicial state of the Southwest Georgia legal system. "There had been such a buildup several weeks before," said Farkas, who is now 70 and in private law practice. "After that, I had to make some decision. We had to get something tried." Farkas threw out the confession, remembering that when he told Irwin to go with his other evidence "(Irwin) said, 'I don't have any other evidence.'" Stoddard protested the decision to throw out Watson's confession claiming it "gutted" the prosecution. "That was the crux of the case," Stoddard said. "All we had left was the eyewitness testimony." Although Farmer argued that Farkas could not rule because he did not preside over the previous hearings, nonetheless, after four hours of arguments, Farkas suppressed the confession. Stoddard and Irwin immediately halted the trial to file an appeal over the suppression of Watson's confession.

==== Appeal ====
November 8, 1977 – The Georgia Court of Appeals overturned Farkas's ruling on the suppression because he ruled on the confessions without presiding over the previous hearings.

November 15, 1977 – Geer returned to the case as his health had returned. He and attorneys for both sides set a trial date for December 27 in Terrell County.

==== Dropping all charges ====
December 14, 1977 – Geer, after hearing about four hours of pre-trial arguments, quickly and quietly threw out Watson's confession, writing in his order that "statements were not freely, voluntarily and intelligently made".

December 19, 1977 – Geer filed an order suppressing the confessions. John Irwin decided not to appeal and dropped all charges against the Dawson Five and closed the investigation, saying without the confessions, prosecutors "don't have much to go on". By that time, two of the defendants had spent one year in jail, and the other three had been incarcerated for almost two years.

== Dawson Five today ==
1. Roosevelt Watson died in his sleep in 1990 from natural causes. His obituary ran in the New York Times.
2. James E. Jackson Jr. died in 2011 from cancer.
3. Johnny B. Jackson lives in Albany with his wife, Patricia, and two daughters Cheryl and Brianna. He drives a truck for Wiley Sanders Trucking. In 2002, the Albany Herald interviewed Johnny B. Jackson. He spoke on the Dawson Five case: "Shoot," he said, "I'm just glad I was delivered from that and allowed to go free."
4. Henderson Watson died in December 2006.
5. J.D. Davenport lives in Albany and works for A-1/ Brantley Septic Services.

=== Others involved ===
District Attorney John Irwin died of stress related health complications in February 1978 at the age 54.

Deputy Jack Hammack was murdered on Nov. 11, 1980, while transporting David Lee Powell, a Terrell County Jail inmate, from a doctor's visit in Albany. Powell was convicted of Hammack's murder in 1981 and sentenced to life in prison.

Judge Walter Idus Geer committed suicide in 1981.

Millard Farmer died in 2020 at the age of 85. He practiced law in Atlanta until 2019 when he was disbarred. In 2011, he donated his papers to Georgia State University's Special Collections and Archives; as well as, contributing an oral history interview in 2012.

Jerry Dean, Terrell County Sheriff (1974-1992). Dean served as Sheriff until 1992, when he lost reelection by 475 votes to one of his deputies, John Bowens, who became the first black sheriff in Southwest Georgia.

Judge Leonard Farkas returned to the bench in Dougherty County until his retirement in 1985.

Assistant District Attorney Michael Stoddard married Jane Waters of Albany and returned to Cobb County. Stoddard would become Cobb's Chief Judge and also serve as a State Court and Superior Court Judge.

Andrew Dintenfass had a successful career as a Director of Photography for feature films and commercials before retiring. He now lives in New York City

Ron Kanter lives in Philadelphia, Pennsylvania, and has directed numerous documentaries including "New Cops" about the Philadelphia Police Department and "Acting Out" about adjudicated and incarcerated juveniles.
