= Dougherty County, Georgia =

County in Georgia, United States

- County
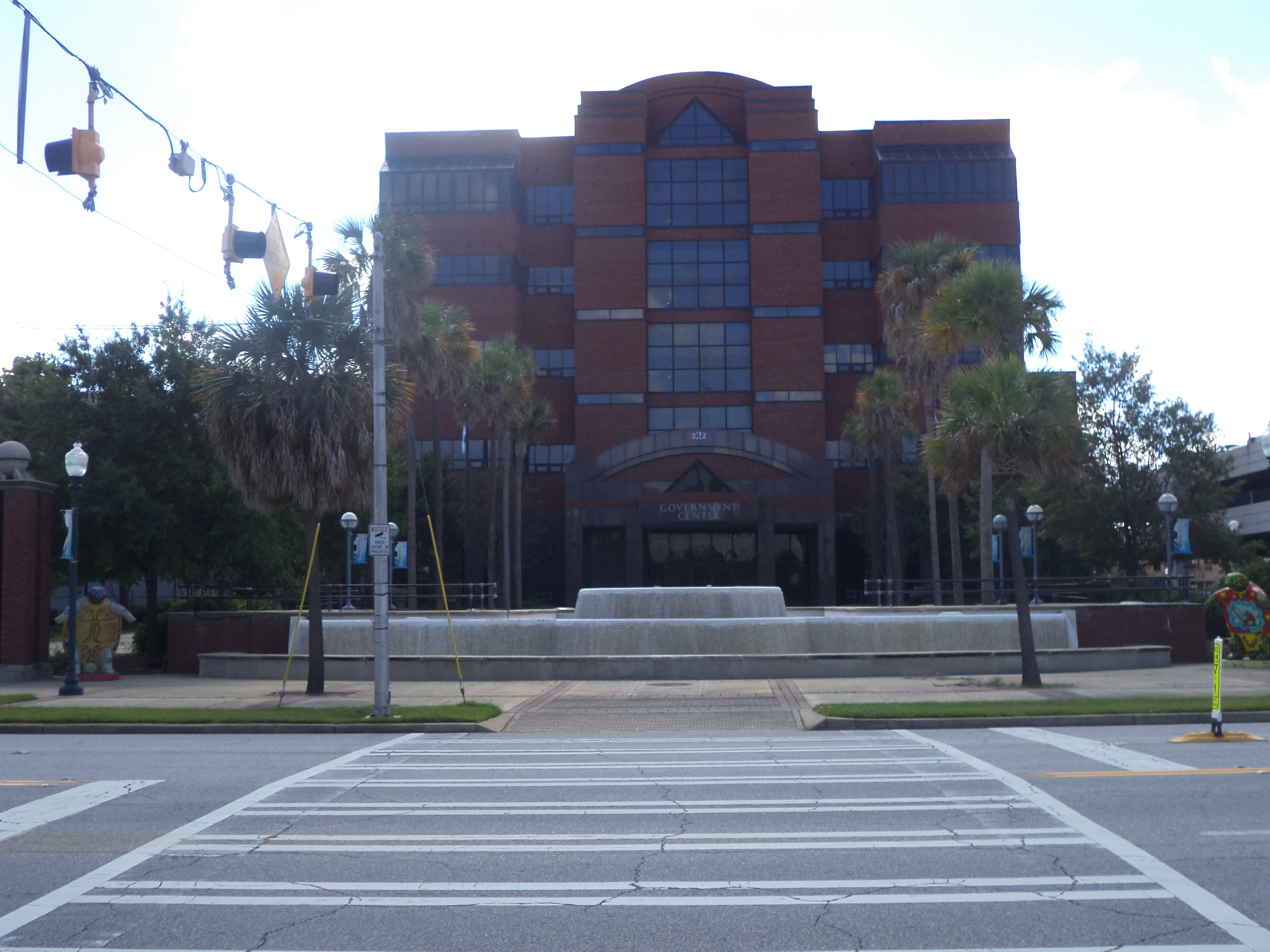
- Dougherty County Government Center

- Location within the U.S. state of Georgia
- Coordinates: 31°32′N 84°13′W
- Country: United States
- State: Georgia
- Founded: 1853; 173 years ago
- Named for: Charles Dougherty
- Seat: Albany
- Largest city: Albany

Area
  - Total: 335 sq mi (870 km^{2})
  - Land: 329 sq mi (850 km^{2})
  - Water: 5.9 sq mi (15 km^{2}) 1.8%

Population (2020)
  - Total: 85,790
  - Estimate (2025): 82,616 ▼
  - Density: 288/sq mi (111/km^{2})
- Time zone: UTC−5 (Eastern)
  - Summer (DST): UTC−4 (EDT)
- Congressional district: 2nd
- Website: www.dougherty.ga.us

Dougherty County is located in the southwestern portion of the U.S. state of Georgia. As of the 2020 census, the population was 85,790. The county seat and sole incorporated city is Albany.

Dougherty County is included in the Albany, GA metropolitan statistical area. Historically dominated by cotton plantation agriculture in the nineteenth century, it is part of the Black Belt of the South.

== History ==
The county was created by the Georgia General Assembly on December 15, 1853, from a part of Baker County. It was named after Charles Dougherty, a respected judge and lawyer from Athens, Georgia. In 1854 and 1856 small areas were added from Worth County.

As noted above, the county was developed by European Americans using enslaved African Americans as workers for the production of cotton as a commodity crop. Its county seat of Albany, Georgia is located on the Flint River, which was originally the chief means of transportation for shipped products. Albany was later served by seven railroad lines, adding to its significance as a market center. The city was a center of the Civil Rights Movement, particularly during the early 1960s.

== Geography ==
According to the U.S. Census Bureau, the county has a total area of 335 square miles (870 km^{2}), of which 329 square miles (850 km^{2}) is land and 5.9 square miles (15 km^{2}) (1.8%) is water.

The majority of Dougherty County is located in the Lower Flint River sub-basin of the ACF River Basin (Apalachicola-Chattahoochee-Flint River Basin). The northeastern corner of the county, northeast of Albany, is located in the Middle Flint River sub-basin of the same ACF River basin. A very small portion of Dougherty County, north of Albany, is located in the Kinchafoonee-Muckalee sub-basin of the larger ACF River Basin. The remaining western portion of the county is located in the Ichawaynochaway Creek sub-basin of the same ACF River Basin.

=== Major highways ===
- U.S. Route 19 / State Route 3
  - U.S. Route 19 Business
- U.S. Route 82 / State Route 520
  - U.S. Route 82 Business / State Route 520 Business
- State Route 62
- State Route 91
- State Route 133
- State Route 234
- State Route 300

=== Adjacent counties ===
- Lee County – north
- Worth County – east
- Mitchell County – south
- Baker County – southwest
- Calhoun County – west
- Terrell County – northwest

== Communities ==
=== City ===
- Albany

=== Census-designated place ===
- Putney

=== Unincorporated communities ===
- Acree
- Doublegate
- Pecan City
- Pretoria
- Radium Springs

== Demographics ==
Historical population
Census	Pop.	Note	%±
1860	8,295		—
1870	11,517		38.8%
1880	12,622		9.6%
1890	12,206		−3.3%
1900	13,679		12.1%
1910	16,035		17.2%
1920	20,063		25.1%
1930	22,306		11.2%
1940	28,565		28.1%
1950	43,617		52.7%
1960	75,680		73.5%
1970	89,639		18.4%
1980	100,718		12.4%
1990	96,311		−4.4%
2000	96,065		−0.3%
2010	94,565		−1.6%
2020	85,790		−9.3%
2025 (est.)	82,616	▼	−3.7%
U.S. Decennial Census; 1790-1880 1890-1910; 1920-1930 1930-1940; 1940-1950 1960-1980; 1980-2000 2010 2020

=== Racial and ethnic composition ===
Dougherty County, Georgia – Racial and ethnic composition Note: the US Census treats Hispanic/Latino as an ethnic category. This table excludes Latinos from the racial categories and assigns them to a separate category. Hispanics/Latinos may be of any race.
Race / Ethnicity (NH = Non-Hispanic)	Pop 1980	Pop 1990	Pop 2000	Pop 2010	Pop 2020	% 1980	% 1990	% 2000	% 2010	% 2020
White alone (NH)	56,331	46,607	35,794	27,315	20,631	55.93%	48.39%	37.26%	28.88%	24.05%
Black or African American alone (NH)	42,531	48,216	57,521	63,198	59,720	42.23%	50.06%	59.88%	66.83%	69.61%
Native American or Alaska Native alone (NH)	239	235	192	177	128	0.24%	0.24%	0.20%	0.19%	0.15%
Asian alone (NH)	372	419	544	719	647	0.37%	0.44%	0.57%	0.76%	0.75%
Native Hawaiian or Pacific Islander alone (NH)	x	x	25	52	20	x	x	0.03%	0.05%	0.02%
Other race alone (NH)	89	18	74	84	234	0.09%	0.02%	0.08%	0.09%	0.27%
Mixed race or Multiracial (NH)	x	x	623	947	1,997	x	x	0.65%	1.00%	2.33%
Hispanic or Latino (any race)	1,156	816	1,292	2,073	2,413	1.15%	0.85%	1.34%	2.19%	2.81%
Total	100,718	96,311	96,065	94,565	85,790	100.00%	100.00%	100.00%	100.00%	100.00%

=== 2020 census ===
As of the 2020 census, the county had a population of 85,790, along with 35,252 households and 18,213 families. The median age was 38.0 years; 22.8% of residents were under the age of 18 and 17.4% were 65 years of age or older.

For every 100 females there were 84.7 males, and for every 100 females age 18 and over there were 79.7 males age 18 and over. 85.6% of residents lived in urban areas, while 14.4% lived in rural areas.

The racial makeup of the county was 24.5% White, 69.9% Black or African American, 0.2% American Indian and Alaska Native, 0.8% Asian, 0.0% Native Hawaiian and Pacific Islander, 1.6% from some other race, and 3.0% from two or more races. Hispanic or Latino residents of any race comprised 2.8% of the population.

There were 35,252 households in the county, of which 28.9% had children under the age of 18 living with them and 43.0% had a female householder with no spouse or partner present. About 34.7% of all households were made up of individuals and 13.2% had someone living alone who was 65 years of age or older.

There were 40,560 housing units, of which 13.1% were vacant. Among occupied housing units, 43.7% were owner-occupied and 56.3% were renter-occupied. The homeowner vacancy rate was 2.1% and the rental vacancy rate was 10.4%.

== Politics ==
As of the 2020s, Dougherty County is a Democratic Party stronghold owing in part to its highly African American population. In 2008 and 2012, Barack Obama performed better in the county than any Democrat since Roosevelt in 1944. The county defied national trends in 2024 when it shifted to the left in favor of Kamala Harris, casting over 70% of its vote for her, outperforming Obama's previous record. It is one of the few Democratic pockets in an area of Georgia that has swung heavily Republican in the 21st century.

For elections to the United States House of Representatives, Dougherty County is part of Georgia's 2nd congressional district, currently represented by Sanford Bishop. For elections to the Georgia State Senate, Dougherty County is part of District 12. For elections to the Georgia House of Representatives, Dougherty County is part of districts 151, 152, 153 and 154.

United States presidential election results for Dougherty County, Georgia
Year	Republican		Democratic		Third party(ies)	
Year	No.	%	No.	%	No.	%
1912	18	2.74%	617	94.05%	21	3.20%
1916	17	1.91%	836	93.93%	37	4.16%
1920	105	14.46%	621	85.54%	0	0.00%
1924	167	12.71%	1,065	81.05%	82	6.24%
1928	379	27.85%	982	72.15%	0	0.00%
1932	95	4.49%	2,012	95.04%	10	0.47%
1936	122	4.49%	2,591	95.40%	3	0.11%
1940	180	7.64%	2,175	92.32%	1	0.04%
1944	338	9.56%	3,199	90.44%	0	0.00%
1948	614	15.66%	2,517	64.19%	790	20.15%
1952	2,535	36.37%	4,435	63.63%	0	0.00%
1956	3,248	44.05%	4,126	55.95%	0	0.00%
1960	4,323	48.88%	4,522	51.12%	0	0.00%
1964	12,776	70.88%	5,248	29.12%	0	0.00%
1968	5,611	29.91%	3,834	20.43%	9,317	49.66%
1972	12,878	78.03%	3,625	21.97%	0	0.00%
1976	9,337	44.89%	11,461	55.11%	0	0.00%
1980	12,726	47.82%	13,430	50.46%	459	1.72%
1984	16,920	56.73%	12,904	43.27%	0	0.00%
1988	15,520	50.86%	12,579	41.22%	2,418	7.92%
1992	12,455	40.27%	15,236	49.26%	3,240	10.47%
1996	11,144	39.98%	15,600	55.97%	1,128	4.05%
2000	12,248	42.14%	16,650	57.29%	166	0.57%
2004	13,711	40.70%	19,805	58.79%	171	0.51%
2008	12,547	32.27%	26,135	67.21%	204	0.52%
2012	11,449	30.15%	26,295	69.24%	231	0.61%
2016	10,232	29.83%	23,311	67.96%	760	2.22%
2020	10,441	29.59%	24,568	69.62%	278	0.79%
2024	9,904	29.26%	23,831	70.40%	115	0.34%

United States Senate election results for Dougherty County, Georgia2
Year	Republican		Democratic		Third party(ies)	
Year	No.	%	No.	%	No.	%
2020	10,588	30.33%	23,821	68.23%	502	1.44%
2020	9,346	29.12%	22,745	70.88%	0	0.00%

United States Senate election results for Dougherty County, Georgia3
Year	Republican		Democratic		Third party(ies)	
Year	No.	%	No.	%	No.	%
2020	5,620	16.11%	17,214	49.36%	12,042	34.53%
2020	9,320	29.02%	22,793	70.98%	0	0.00%
2022	7,755	29.14%	18,603	69.90%	256	0.96%
2022	7,091	28.44%	17,839	71.56%	0	0.00%

Georgia Gubernatorial election results for Dougherty County
Year	Republican		Democratic		Third party(ies)	
Year	No.	%	No.	%	No.	%
1966	7,930	55.43%	5,719	39.97%	658	4.60%
1970	4,917	33.66%	9,591	65.66%	99	0.68%
1974	2,058	14.84%	11,809	85.16%	0	0.00%
1978	1,561	14.59%	9,138	85.41%	0	0.00%
1982	6,559	35.41%	11,964	64.59%	0	0.00%
1986	5,283	24.71%	16,093	75.29%	0	0.00%
1990	9,025	42.42%	11,976	56.29%	275	1.29%
1994	8,650	39.97%	12,992	60.03%	0	0.00%
1998	7,825	31.92%	16,446	67.09%	242	0.99%
2002	8,261	36.09%	14,400	62.91%	230	1.00%
2006	7,441	33.62%	14,369	64.92%	324	1.46%
2010	8,685	31.83%	17,916	65.67%	681	2.50%
2014	7,502	31.96%	15,635	66.61%	337	1.44%
2018	9,330	29.69%	21,980	69.94%	115	0.37%
2022	8,524	31.91%	18,091	67.73%	94	0.35%
2026	7,075	25.95%	20,186	74.05%	0	0.00%

== See also ==
- National Register of Historic Places listings in Dougherty County, Georgia
- List of counties in Georgia
- W.E.B. Du Bois, The Souls of Black Folk (1903) contains two essays that are surveys of race relations in Dougherty County from Reconstruction to the end of the 19th century.
  - "Of the Black Belt"
  - "Of the Quest of the Golden Fleece"
