= Radium Springs, Georgia =

Unincorporated community in Georgia, U.S.

Coordinates: 31°31′35″N 84°08′08″W

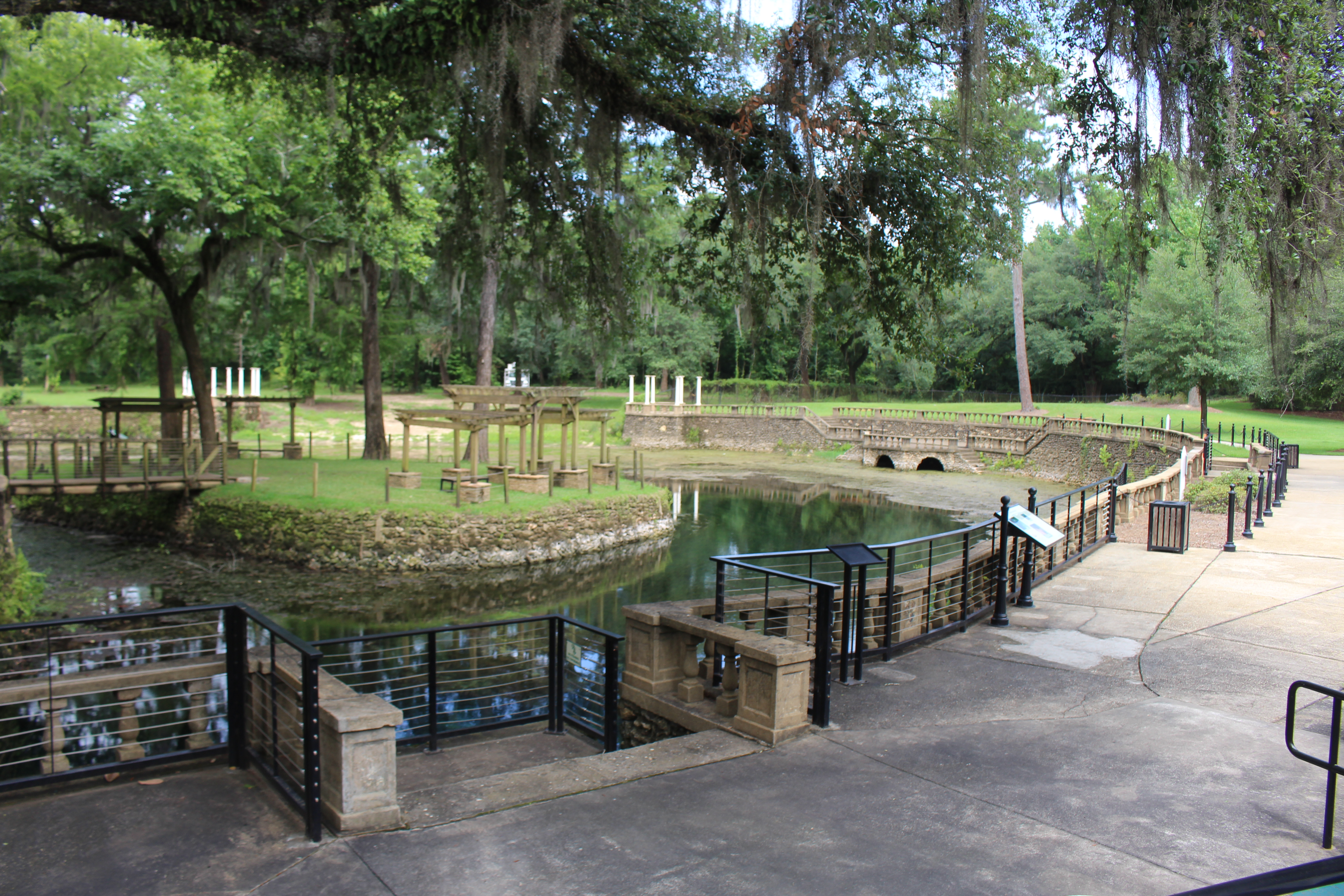
Overlooking Radium Springs

Radium Springs is an unincorporated community located on the southeast outskirts of Albany in Dougherty County, Georgia, United States. It is part of the Albany Metropolitan Statistical Area.

Radium Springs is best known as the location of one of the "Seven Natural Wonders of Georgia": the largest natural spring in the state. The deep blue waters of Radium Springs flow at 70,000 U.S. gallons (260,000 liters) per minute and empty into the Flint River. There is also an extensive underwater cavern system.

The water contains trace amounts of radium, and the water temperature is 68 °F (20 °C) year-round.

Prior to the discovery of radium in the water in 1925, the site was known as "Blue Springs".

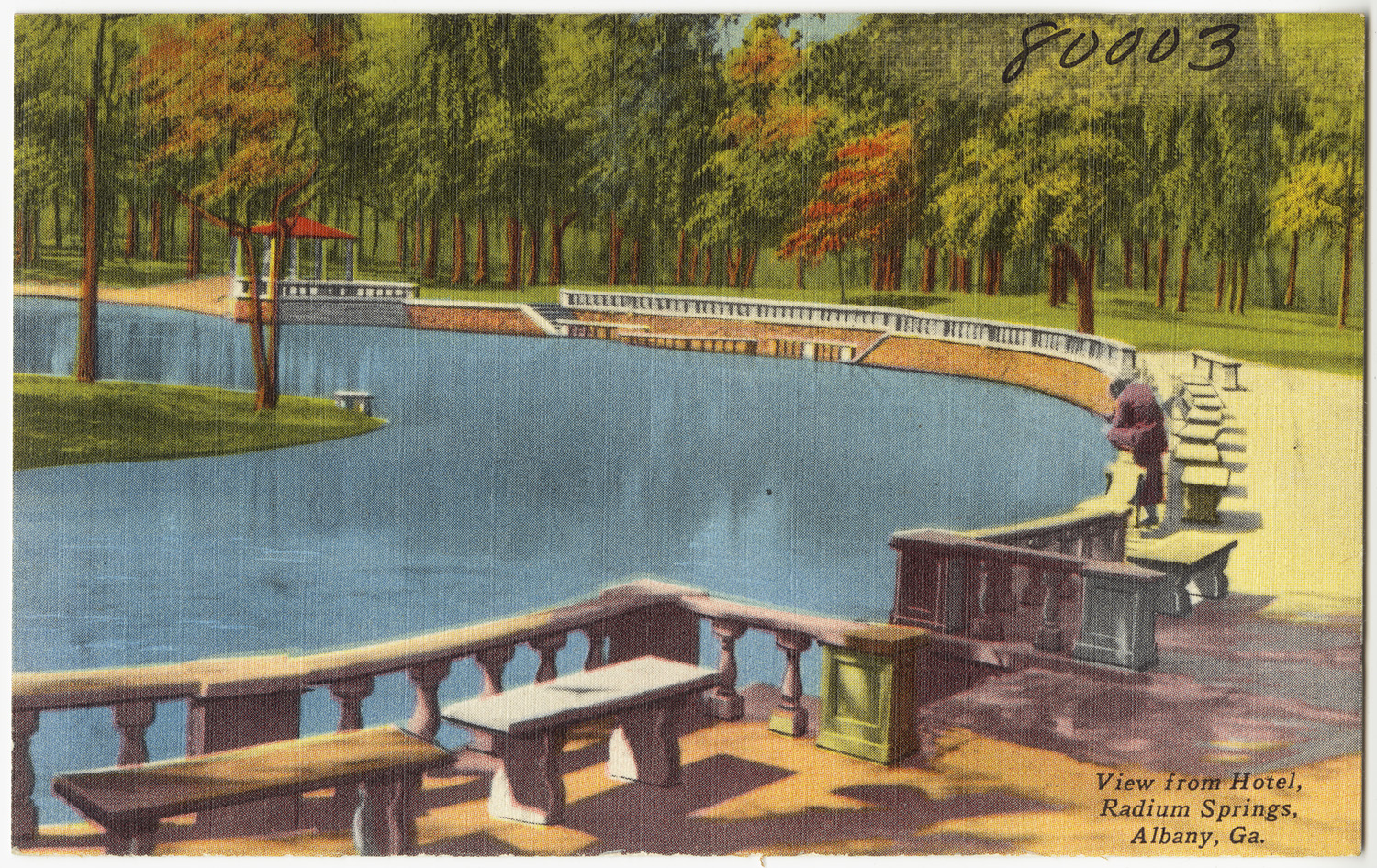
Postcard of Radium Springs

A casino was built overlooking the springs in the 1920s, and Radium Springs was a popular spa and resort. Northerners traveling by train to spend winter in Florida often stopped to swim in the springs, which were thought at the time to be healthful because of the radium content. The casino was severely damaged when the river flooded in 1994 and again in 1998 and was demolished in 2003.

== See also ==
- Cave diving
- Hot spring
