= Terrell Academy =

Private K3-12 school in Dawson, Georgia, United States

Location
- Dawson, Georgia; 31.7631142°N 84.4316996°W

Information
- Type: Private
- NCES School ID: 00296492
- Grades: K3-12
- Website: www.terrellacademy.com

Terrell Academy is a private K3-12 school in Dawson, Georgia, seat of Terrell County. It serves 580 students. The school has a controversial history as a segregation academy.

== History ==
Terrell was founded in 1970 as a segregation academy. In the summer of 1970, a senior told the Atlanta Constitution she enrolled in Terrell Academy so she "didn't have to spend the rest of her life sitting next to a nigger."

In 1973, headmaster Thomas Church told the Atlanta Constitution that racial situation in Terrell County School District boosted the private school’s enrollment.

In 1977, Terrell Academy director W.C. Woodall acknowledged that the school was founded in response to a court order mandating the integration of public school faculty. Woodall stated that although he personally supported racial segregation, black students would be welcome at Terrell.

The school was however granted tax-exempt status in 1970.

== Alumni ==
- Harry Spilman, baseball player
- Cole Swindell, country music performer

In 2020, in grades PK-12, the school had a total of 351 students and 32.1 teachers on a full-time equivalent basis. The school did not report demographic information to the NCES.
