= Putney, Georgia =

- Unincorporated community Census-designated place
- Location in Dougherty County and the state of Georgia

- Location within the United States
- Coordinates: 31°28′23″N 84°7′17″W
- Country: United States
- State: Georgia
- County: Dougherty

Area
  - Total: 22.13 sq mi (57.31 km^{2})
  - Land: 22.02 sq mi (57.03 km^{2})
  - Water: 0.11 sq mi (0.28 km^{2})
- Elevation: 200 ft (61 m)

Population (2020)
  - Total: 2,869
  - Density: 130/sq mi (50.3/km^{2})
- Time zone: UTC-5 (Eastern (EST))
  - Summer (DST): UTC-4 (EDT)
- ZIP code: 31782
- Area code: 229
- FIPS code: 13-63084
- GNIS feature ID: 0332767

Putney is an unincorporated community and census-designated place (CDP) in Dougherty County, Georgia, United States. As of the 2020 census, Putney had a population of 2,869. It is part of the Albany, Georgia Metropolitan Statistical Area.

== History ==
A post office called Putney was established in 1897. The community was named after Francis F. Putney, a local landowner.

== Geography ==
Putney is located in southeastern Dougherty County at 31°28′23″N 84°7′17″W (31.473076, -84.121492). The southern border of the CDP is the Mitchell County line, and part of the western edge is the Flint River. U.S. Route 19 (the Liberty Expressway) is the main highway through Putney, leading north 7 miles (11 km) to Albany and south 50 miles (80 km) to Thomasville.

According to the United States Census Bureau, the Putney CDP has a total area of 21.9 square miles (56.8 km^{2}), of which 21.9 square miles (56.6 km^{2}) is land and 0.1 square miles (0.3 km^{2}), or 0.49%, is water.

== Demographics ==
Historical population
Census	Pop.	Note	%±
1990	3,108		—
2000	2,998		−3.5%
2010	2,898		−3.3%
2020	2,869		−1.0%
U.S. Decennial Census; 1850-1870 1870-1880; 1890-1910 1920-1930; 1940 1950 1960; 1970 1980 1990; 2000 2010 2020

Putney first appeared as a census designated place in the 1990 U.S. census.

=== Racial and ethnic composition ===
Putney CDP, Georgia – Racial and ethnic composition Note: the US Census treats Hispanic/Latino as an ethnic category. This table excludes Latinos from the racial categories and assigns them to a separate category. Hispanics/Latinos may be of any race.
Race / Ethnicity (NH = Non-Hispanic)	Pop 2000	Pop 2010	Pop 2020	% 2000	% 2010	% 2020
White alone (NH)	2,049	1,464	1,430	68.35%	50.52%	49.84%
Black or African American alone (NH)	884	1,301	1,237	29.49%	44.89%	43.12%
Native American or Alaska Native alone (NH)	4	15	16	0.13%	0.52%	0.56%
Asian alone (NH)	7	12	4	0.23%	0.41%	0.14%
Pacific Islander alone (NH)	0	1	0	0.00%	0.03%	0.00%
Other race alone (NH)	0	1	14	0.00%	0.03%	0.49%
Mixed race or Multiracial (NH)	24	47	85	0.80%	1.62%	2.96%
Hispanic or Latino (any race)	30	57	83	1.00%	1.97%	2.89%
Total	2,998	2,898	2,869	100.00%	100.00%	100.00%

=== 2020 census ===
As of the 2020 census, Putney had a population of 2,869. The median age was 44.8 years. 19.1% of residents were under the age of 18 and 20.5% of residents were 65 years of age or older. For every 100 females, there were 97.2 males, and for every 100 females age 18 and over, there were 96.6 males age 18 and over.

0.0% of residents lived in urban areas, while 100.0% lived in rural areas.

There were 1,178 households, of which 25.5% had children under the age of 18 living in them. Of all households, 43.2% were married-couple households, 22.4% were households with a male householder and no spouse or partner present, and 26.8% were households with a female householder and no spouse or partner present. About 28.7% of all households were made up of individuals, and 12.1% had someone living alone who was 65 years of age or older.

There were 1,298 housing units, of which 9.2% were vacant. The homeowner vacancy rate was 1.9%, and the rental vacancy rate was 11.1%.

=== 2000 census ===
As of the census of 2000, there were 2,998 people, 1,138 households, and 899 families residing in the CDP. The population density was 139.6 inhabitants per square mile (53.9/km^{2}). There were 1,223 housing units at an average density of 56.9 units per square mile (22.0 units/km^{2}). The racial makeup of the CDP was 68.81% White, 29.52% African American, 0.13% Native American, 0.23% Asian, 0.50% from other races, and 0.80% from two or more races. Hispanic or Latino of any race were 1.00% of the population.

There were 1,138 households, out of which 31.8% had children under the age of 18 living with them, 59.7% were married couples living together, 14.8% had a female householder with no husband present, and 21.0% were non-families. 17.2% of all households were made up of individuals, and 5.4% had someone living alone who was 65 years of age or older. The average household size was 2.63 and the average family size was 2.96.

In the CDP, the population was spread out, with 24.4% under the age of 18, 8.3% from 18 to 24, 26.5% from 25 to 44, 28.5% from 45 to 64, and 12.3% who were 65 years of age or older. The median age was 39 years. For every 100 females, there were 96.8 males. For every 100 females age 18 and over, there were 93.8 males.

The median income for a household in the CDP was $40,953, and the median income for a family was $44,244. Males had a median income of $35,377 versus $21,910 for females. The per capita income for the CDP was $18,828. About 12.8% of families and 16.8% of the population were below the poverty line, including 26.9% of those under age 18 and 11.9% of those age 65 or over.

== Neighborhoods ==
- Hollands Folly
- Loretta Heights
