= Bronwood Calaboose =

- U.S. National Register of Historic Places
- Location within Georgia
- Location: GA 118, Bronwood, Georgia
- Coordinates: 31°49′54″N 84°21′46″W
- Area: 0.1 acres (0.040 ha)
- Built: 1900
- NRHP reference No.: 82002483
- Added to NRHP: June 22, 1982

The Bronwood Calaboose is a calaboose built in 1900 in Bronwood, Georgia. It is a wooden jail, about 16 by 9 feet (4.9 m × 2.7 m) in plan, with a gable roof, built of heavy sawn timbers. It was listed on the National Register of Historic Places in 1982.

It was deemed "significant as a rare and intact example of a turn-of-the-century wooden municipal jail. It stands in contrast to the larger brick county jails, the most common type of historical jail in the state."

It is located on First Street (Georgia State Route 118) between Johnson and Thornton Streets in Bronwood.
