= Doublegate, Georgia =

- Neighborhood
- Location within Georgia Location within the United States
- Coordinates: Community 31°35′56″N 84°15′20″W
- Country: United States
- State: Georgia
- County: Dougherty
- Elevation: 207 ft (63 m)
- Time zone: UTC-5 (Eastern (EST))
  - Summer (DST): UTC-4 (EDT)
- ZIP code: 31721
- Area code: 229
- GNIS feature ID: 1671077

Doublegate is a neighborhood within the city of Albany in Dougherty County, Georgia, United States. It is located 7 miles (11 km) northwest of the center of Albany, at latitude 31.599 north and longitude 84.255 west. Its elevation is 207 feet (63 m) above sea level. The neighborhood consists of residential streets surrounding the Doublegate Country Club.

== Churches ==
There a number of churches in Doublegate, including Northgate Presbyterian Church, Church of Christ Beattie Road, St Patrick's Episcopal Church, and Christ United Methodist Church.
