= Finding the Flint =

Non-profit environmentalist organization in Georgia, U.S.

- Types: nonprofit organization
- Headquarters: Georgia, USA
- Website: findingtheflint.org

Finding the Flint (FTF) is a non-profit environmental advocacy organization and non-profit project created by American Rivers and The Conservation Fund, non-profit organizations who advocate for protecting rivers in the United States, and the Atlanta Regional Commission.

Finding the Flint focuses on the cultural, physical, and environmental restoration of the Flint River, focusing on its headwaters in the Hartsfield-Jackson Atlanta International Airport, and streams or creeks affected by the environment.

Finding the Flint also aims to raise awareness about the existence of the Flint River, which is obscured by urban expansion that has occurred around the metropolitan area of Atlanta.

== History ==
In 2017, American Rivers, The Conservation Fund, and the Atlanta Regional Commission hired Ryan Gravel's firm Sixpitch to bring several ideas together in an aerotropolis-wide vision for the Flint River headwaters, focusing on the restoration of the Flint. With the support of Southside native and author Hannah Palmer, the Finding the Flint was born.

The Finding the Flint project is supported by Delta Air Lines and the metro Atlanta cities of East Point, College Park, and Hapeville.

In 2021, MARTA planned to offer 7-acres of territory near the Flint's headwaters in College Park to Finding the Flint, for $218,000, to create the city's first nature preserve. MARTA's Board of Directors Planning and Capital Programs Committee voted on April 29, 2021, to sell the 7-acres of wetland.
