= Pachitla Creek =

Stream in Georgia, U.S.

Coordinates: 31°28′53.63″N 84°34′25.69″W

Pachitla Creek is a stream in the U.S. state of Georgia. It is a tributary to Ichawaynochaway Creek.

Pachitla is a name derived from a Native American language meaning either "dead pigeon", "pigeon town" or "opossum".
