= Killing of James Brazier =

1957 victim of police brutality

James Brazier (c. 1926 – April 25, 1958) was an African-American victim of police brutality and substandard medical care that followed. He was imprisoned, fined, and beaten to death by police officers, in events spanning between 1957 and 1958. Brazier was a United States Army veteran and had lived in Dawson, Georgia.

== History ==
Police targeted Brazier because he was black and owned nice cars from the dealership he worked at. He started having police and law enforcement issues in November 1957, when he was first arrested, fined and beaten and was charged with a speeding charge and driving under the influence by Officer Weyman Burchle Cherry. Brazier complained about severe headaches after the incident in November 1957, and his wife visited the Dawson police with a medical bill to talk about the ongoing head issues.

In spring 1958 the family purchased a new 1958 Impala. On April 20, 1958, he was imprisoned, fined, and beaten by the police again. Brazier was arrested by Officer Cherry and placed in jail, where he saw Dr. Charles M. Ward who misdiagnosed him as drunk based on slurred speech. As a result he was not given an x-ray or follow up care. Brazier died on April 25, 1958, and an autopsy was conducted, it was determined that the victim died as a result of “cerebral necrosis and hemorrhage secondary to severe contra-coup trauma” and listed “skull fracture” and “multiple contusions of the scalp”. The officer who killed him had also beaten and shot other black men.

His wife Hattie brought a civil lawsuit against the Dawson Police Officers, W. B. Cherry, Randolph McDonald, Zachary T. Matthews, et al., and it took 5 years to go to trial in February 1963. A key witness in the case was threatened and murdered. The FBI investigated police brutality on the basis of this and other cases. In 2008 the FBI reviewed the case before closing it.

Weyman Cherry, 44, died in a car crash on October 29, 1970.
