= Cooleewahee Creek =

Stream in Georgia, U.S.

Coordinates: 31°18′49″N 84°19′37″W

Cooleewahee Creek is a stream in the U.S. state of Georgia. It is a tributary to the Flint River.

According to tradition, Cooleewahee is a name derived from the Muskogee language translating to "where the white oak acorns are scattered".
