= Walk-Ikey Creek =

Stream in Georgia, U.S.

Coordinates: 31°42′10″N 84°32′43″W

Walk-Ikey Creek is a stream in the U.S. state of Georgia. It is a tributary to Ichawaynochaway Creek.

Walk-Ikey is a name derived from a Native American language meaning "cow creek".
