= Pretoria, Georgia =

Settlement in Georgia, US

- Unincorporated community
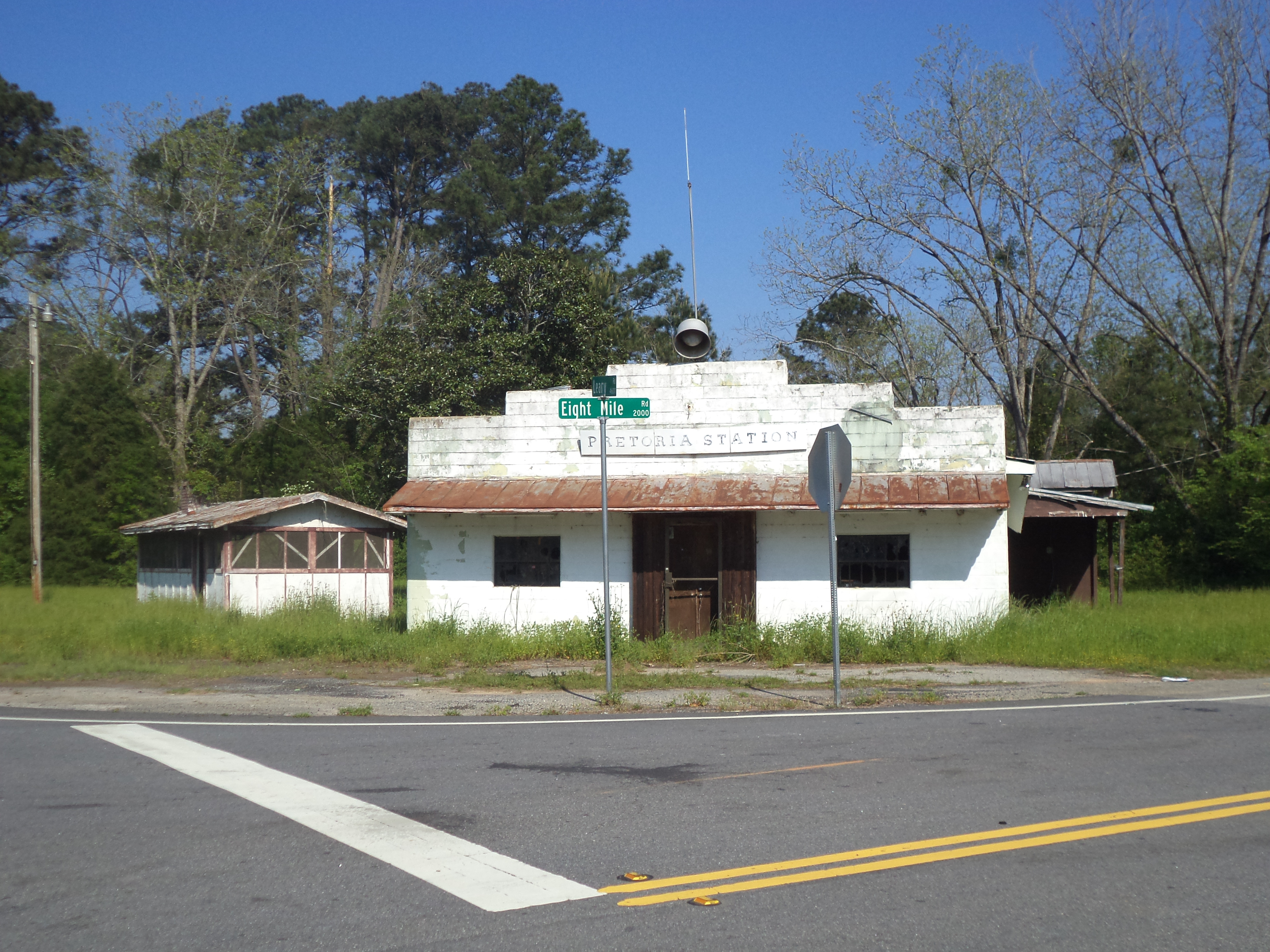
- Pretoria Station

- Location in Georgia Pretoria (the United States)
- Coordinates: Community 31°30′15″N 84°19′1″W
- Country: United States
- State: Georgia
- County: Dougherty
- Elevation: 187 ft (57 m)
- Time zone: UTC-5 (Eastern (EST))
  - Summer (DST): UTC-4 (EDT)
- ZIP code: 31721
- Area code: 229

Pretoria is an unincorporated community located in Dougherty County in the U.S. state of Georgia.

== History ==
A post office called Pretoria was established in 1900, and remained in operation until 1917. The community's name is a transfer from Pretoria, in South Africa.

The Georgia General Assembly incorporated Pretoria as a town in 1907. The town's municipal charter was repealed in 1995.

== Geography ==
Pretoria's latitude is at 31.504 and its longitude is at -84.317. Its elevation rests at 187 feet. Pretoria appears on the Pretoria U.S. Geological Survey Map.n It rests on the intersections of Tarva Road, Eight Mile Road, and Georgia Highway 62 (Leary Road). Old Pretoria Road, Lonesome Road, Coakly Avenue, Aristedes Road, Slade Avenue, Legget Drive, Vanderbilt Drive and Bluebird Lane also rest in the area. Hunter Lake is the area's largest body of water and the Cooleewahee Creek runs through the town. There are signs welcoming one into the community as well as a 'Dougherty County Work Ready Community Sign'.

== Schools ==
Pretoria has one school called Sherwood Christian Academy. This school is a private school which teaches grades K-12. Sherwood owns legacy park, a large sports complex most notable for its large cross. Sherwood Christian Academy is affiliated with Sherwood Baptist Church of Albany, Georgia.

== Subdivisions ==
- Rolling Acres Subdivision
