= Terrell County, Georgia =

County in Georgia, United States

- County
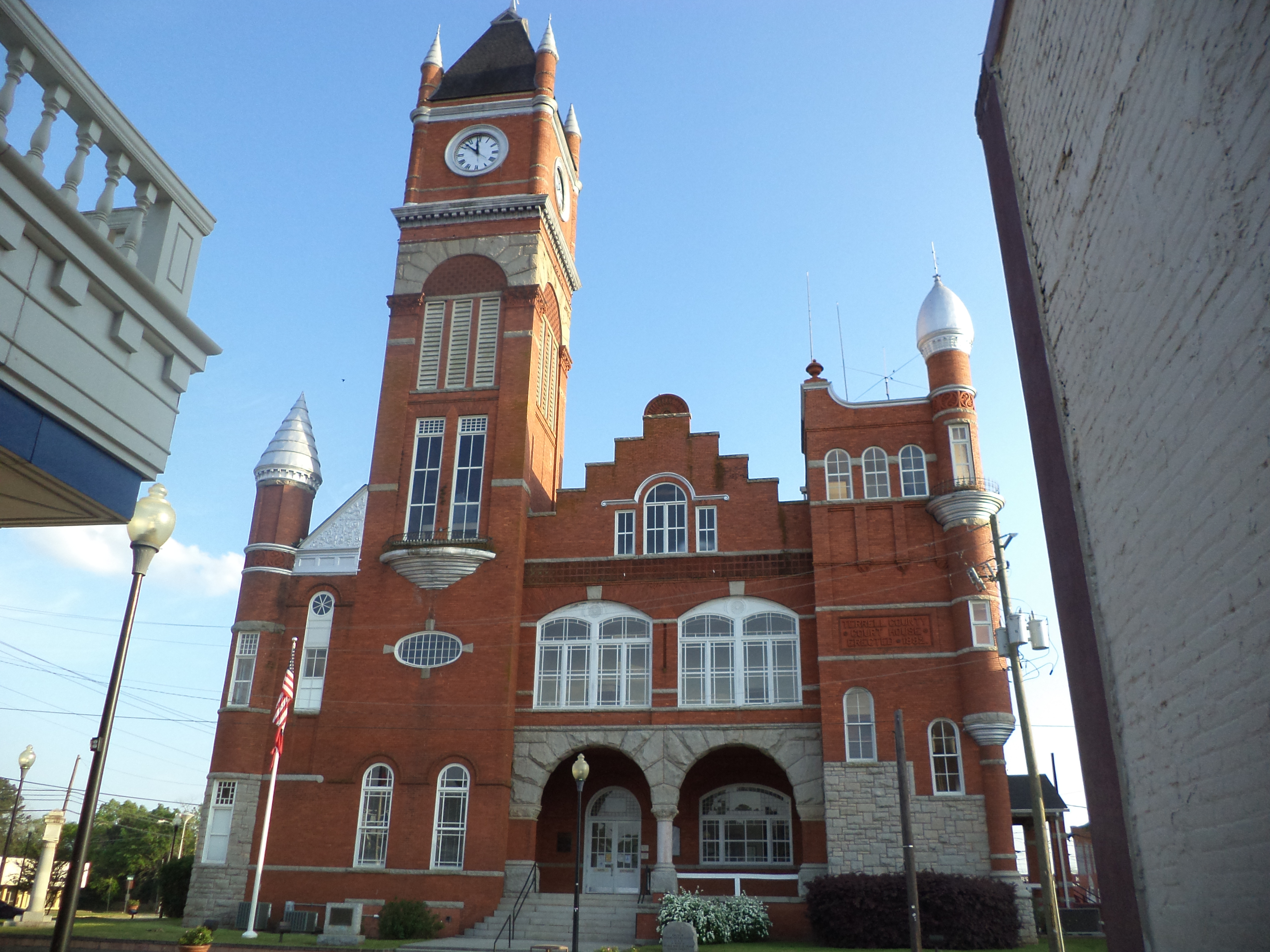
- Terrell County Courthouse in Dawson

- Location within the U.S. state of Georgia
- Coordinates: 31°47′N 84°26′W
- Country: United States
- State: Georgia
- Founded: February 16, 1856; 170 years ago
- Named for: William Terrell
- Seat: Dawson
- Largest city: Dawson

Area
  - Total: 338 sq mi (880 km^{2})
  - Land: 335 sq mi (870 km^{2})
  - Water: 2.3 sq mi (6.0 km^{2}) 0.7%

Population (2020)
  - Total: 9,185
  - Estimate (2025): 8,656 ▼
  - Density: 27/sq mi (10/km^{2})
- Time zone: UTC−5 (Eastern)
  - Summer (DST): UTC−4 (EDT)
- Congressional district: 2nd
- Website: terrellcountyga.gov

Terrell County is a county located in the southwestern portion of the U.S. state of Georgia. As of the 2020 census, the population was 9,185. The county seat is Dawson. Terrell County is included in the Albany, Georgia metropolitan area.

== History ==
Formed from portions of Randolph and Lee counties on February 16, 1856, by an act of the Georgia General Assembly, Terrell County is named for William Terrell of Sparta, Georgia, who served in the Georgia General Assembly and the United States House of Representatives.

During the American Civil War, after Atlanta's capture by Union forces, a refugee settlement was established in Terrell County for civilians forced to flee the city. The Fosterville settlement, named after Georgia Quartermaster General Ira Roe Foster, was according to author Mary Elizabeth Massey in her 2001 history, the "most ambitious refugee project approved by the Georgia General Assembly" [during that period]. On March 11, 1865, the Georgia General Assembly authorized General Foster to "continue to provide for maintenance of said exiles, or such of them as are unable by their labor to support themselves, or their families for the balance of the present year."

During the civil rights era of the 1960s, the local white minority resisted change, sometimes violently; it subsequently became known as "Terrible Terrell County". In 1958 the county refused to register a group of African-Americans including several teachers with bachelor's and master's degrees on the grounds that they couldn't read, and a college-educated marine who was refused registration on the grounds he could not write intelligibly. The case eventually reached the U.S. Supreme Court, and the county was ordered to allow them to register, but they did not immediately comply. In 1960, testimony showed that Black voters were given more tests, and more difficult ones, than White voters, and that illiterate Whites were allowed to vote while well-educated Blacks were falsely determined to be illiterate. The county asserted that this was not discriminatory. In September 1962, an African-American church was burned down after it was used for voter registration meetings. (Note: Like other Southern states, Georgia had disenfranchised most Blacks at the turn of the century by rules raising barriers to voter registration; they were still excluded from the political system.) That month Prathia Hall delivered a speech at the site of the ruins, using the repeated phrase "I have a dream." Rev. Martin Luther King Jr. attended her speech; afterward, he also began to use that phrase, including in his noted "I Have a Dream" speech in 1963 at the Lincoln Memorial in Washington, DC.

== Geography ==
According to the U.S. Census Bureau, the county has a total area of 338 square miles (880 km^{2}), of which 335 square miles (870 km^{2}) is land and 2.3 square miles (6.0 km^{2}) (0.7%) is water.

The western and southern two-thirds of Terrell County is located in the Ichawaynochaway Creek sub-basin of the ACF River Basin (Apalachicola-Chattahoochee-Flint River Basin). The county's northeastern third is located in the Kinchafoonee-Muckalee sub-basin of the same larger ACF River Basin.

=== Major highways ===
- U.S. Route 82
- State Route 32
- State Route 41
- State Route 45
- State Route 49
- State Route 50
- State Route 55
- State Route 118
- State Route 520

=== Adjacent counties ===
- Webster County - north
- Sumter County - northeast
- Lee County - east
- Dougherty County - southeast
- Calhoun County - southwest
- Randolph County - west

== Communities ==
=== City ===
- Dawson

=== Towns ===
- Bronwood
- Parrott
- Sasser

== Demographics ==
Historical population
Census	Pop.	Note	%±
1860	6,232		—
1870	9,053		45.3%
1880	10,451		15.4%
1890	14,503		38.8%
1900	19,023		31.2%
1910	22,003		15.7%
1920	19,601		−10.9%
1930	18,290		−6.7%
1940	16,675		−8.8%
1950	14,314		−14.2%
1960	12,742		−11.0%
1970	11,416		−10.4%
1980	12,017		5.3%
1990	10,653		−11.4%
2000	10,970		3.0%
2010	9,315		−15.1%
2020	9,185		−1.4%
2025 (est.)	8,656	▼	−5.8%
U.S. Decennial Census; 1790-1880 1890-1910; 1920-1930 1930-1940; 1940-1950 1960-1980; 1980-2000 2010

=== Racial and ethnic composition ===
Terrell County, Georgia – Racial and ethnic composition Note: the US Census treats Hispanic/Latino as an ethnic category. This table excludes Latinos from the racial categories and assigns them to a separate category. Hispanics/Latinos may be of any race.
Race / Ethnicity (NH = Non-Hispanic)	Pop 1980	Pop 1990	Pop 2000	Pop 2010	Pop 2020	% 1980	% 1990	% 2000	% 2010	% 2020
White alone (NH)	4,692	4,241	4,101	3,366	3,189	39.04%	39.81%	37.38%	36.14%	34.72%
Black or African American alone (NH)	7,151	6,356	6,614	5,683	5,540	59.51%	59.66%	60.29%	61.01%	60.32%
Native American or Alaska Native alone (NH)	5	8	22	14	11	0.04%	0.08%	0.20%	0.15%	0.12%
Asian alone (NH)	5	8	31	29	57	0.04%	0.08%	0.28%	0.31%	0.62%
Native Hawaiian or Pacific Islander alone (NH)	x	x	3	0	1	x	x	0.03%	0.00%	0.01%
Other race alone (NH)	3	0	4	3	11	0.02%	0.00%	0.04%	0.03%	0.12%
Mixed race or Multiracial (NH)	x	x	59	63	199	x	x	0.54%	0.68%	2.17%
Hispanic or Latino (any race)	161	40	136	157	177	1.34%	0.38%	1.24%	1.69%	1.93%
Total	12,017	10,653	10,970	9,315	9,185	100.00%	100.00%	100.00%	100.00%	100.00%

=== 2020 census ===
As of the 2020 census, the county had a population of 9,185, 3,664 households, and 2,348 families residing there. The median age was 44.1 years, 21.6% of residents were under the age of 18, 21.5% were 65 years of age or older, and for every 100 females there were 94.8 males (90.3 males for every 100 females age 18 and over). 0.0% of residents lived in urban areas, while 100.0% lived in rural areas.

The racial makeup of the county was 35.2% White, 60.6% Black or African American, 0.1% American Indian and Alaska Native, 0.7% Asian, 0.0% Native Hawaiian and Pacific Islander, 0.6% from some other race, and 2.6% from two or more races. Hispanic or Latino residents of any race comprised 1.9% of the population.

There were 3,664 households in the county, of which 27.5% had children under the age of 18 living with them and 37.8% had a female householder with no spouse or partner present. About 30.4% of all households were made up of individuals and 14.3% had someone living alone who was 65 years of age or older.

There were 4,243 housing units, of which 13.6% were vacant. Among occupied housing units, 60.3% were owner-occupied and 39.7% were renter-occupied. The homeowner vacancy rate was 2.0% and the rental vacancy rate was 4.9%.

== Politics ==
As of the 2020s, Terrell County is a marginally Democratic leaning county, voting 52% for Kamala Harris in 2024. As a county with a majority African-American population, voters in Terrell County prefer Democratic candidates counties in presidential elections. Terrell County has consistently been a Democratic county since the 1992 presidential election, though the margins have historically been close. In 1940, Franklin D. Roosevelt received 100% of all votes cast in Terrell County.

For elections to the United States House of Representatives, Terrell County is part of Georgia's 2nd congressional district, currently represented by Sanford Bishop. For elections to the Georgia State Senate, Terrell County is part of District 12. For elections to the Georgia House of Representatives, Terrell County is part of District 151.

United States presidential election results for Terrell County, Georgia
Year	Republican		Democratic		Third party(ies)	
Year	No.	%	No.	%	No.	%
1912	12	2.23%	500	93.11%	25	4.66%
1916	13	1.78%	677	92.74%	40	5.48%
1920	48	8.76%	500	91.24%	0	0.00%
1924	45	6.47%	630	90.52%	21	3.02%
1928	116	11.45%	897	88.55%	0	0.00%
1932	24	2.34%	1,000	97.37%	3	0.29%
1936	61	4.36%	1,336	95.50%	2	0.14%
1940	0	0.00%	1,040	100.00%	0	0.00%
1944	49	2.90%	1,639	97.10%	0	0.00%
1948	100	10.52%	608	63.93%	243	25.55%
1952	369	21.16%	1,375	78.84%	0	0.00%
1956	203	13.51%	1,300	86.49%	0	0.00%
1960	285	17.41%	1,352	82.59%	0	0.00%
1964	1,921	77.15%	569	22.85%	0	0.00%
1968	545	15.06%	1,276	35.26%	1,798	49.68%
1972	2,057	74.99%	686	25.01%	0	0.00%
1976	1,168	33.22%	2,348	66.78%	0	0.00%
1980	1,378	40.29%	2,010	58.77%	32	0.94%
1984	1,744	52.18%	1,598	47.82%	0	0.00%
1988	1,517	52.22%	1,383	47.61%	5	0.17%
1992	1,143	32.90%	1,942	55.90%	389	11.20%
1996	1,111	40.33%	1,509	54.77%	135	4.90%
2000	1,504	48.31%	1,584	50.88%	25	0.80%
2004	1,859	48.58%	1,951	50.98%	17	0.44%
2008	1,890	42.75%	2,501	56.57%	30	0.68%
2012	1,834	41.62%	2,544	57.73%	29	0.66%
2016	1,874	44.58%	2,267	53.92%	63	1.50%
2020	2,004	45.38%	2,376	53.80%	36	0.82%
2024	2,075	47.80%	2,253	51.90%	13	0.30%

United States Senate election results for Terrell County, Georgia2
Year	Republican		Democratic		Third party(ies)	
Year	No.	%	No.	%	No.	%
2020	2,040	46.63%	2,277	52.05%	58	1.33%
2020	1,868	45.30%	2,256	54.70%	0	0.00%

United States Senate election results for Terrell County, Georgia3
Year	Republican		Democratic		Third party(ies)	
Year	No.	%	No.	%	No.	%
2020	1,058	24.33%	1,508	34.68%	1,782	40.98%
2020	2,004	45.75%	2,376	54.25%	0	0.00%
2022	1,695	44.51%	1,904	50.00%	209	5.49%
2022	1,571	46.92%	1,777	53.08%	0	0.00%

Georgia Gubernatorial election results for Terrell County
Year	Republican		Democratic		Third party(ies)	
Year	No.	%	No.	%	No.	%
2022	1,795	49.10%	1,840	50.33%	21	0.57%

== Education ==
Public education is provided by the Terrell County School District.

== Notable people ==
- Benjamin J. Davis Jr., Harvard Law School graduate and elected to New York City Council. Defended Angelo Herndon in Georgia against insurrection charges for organizing a union, resulting in a U.S. Supreme Court case that ruled against Georgia's insurrection law as unconstitutional.
- Walter Washington, activist and politician, elected as the first black mayor of Washington, D.C. after Congress granted home rule to the city.
- Otis Redding, rhythm and blues singer; one of the first crossover artists appealing to both young blacks and whites in the post-World War II era.
- Cole Swindell, is an American country music singer and songwriter who attended Terrell Academy in Dawson, Georgia.

== See also ==
- Dawson Five
- National Register of Historic Places listings in Terrell County, Georgia
- USS Terrell County (LST-1157)
- List of counties in Georgia
