= Ichawaynochaway Creek =

River in Georgia, United States

Coordinates: 31.799655°N 84.564438°W

Ichawaynochaway Creek is a creek in southwest Georgia. It rises near Weston in two forks and flows south-southeasterly for 83.8 miles (134.9 km), joining the Flint River 13 miles (21 km) southwest of Newton.

Ichawaynochaway was a Muskogee word that may have referred to either beavers or deer; it likely meant "the place where the deer sleep."

The creek rises in Webster County. The west fork of the creek enters Stewart County briefly; the forks combine in Randolph County and the creek flows through Randolph and Terrell counties, forming the southern part of their boundary. It flows through Calhoun County and enters Baker County, where it joins the Flint.

Ichawaynochaway Creek is commonly referred to as Notchaway Creek.

== Tributaries ==
- Pachitla Creek
- Walk-Ikey Creek
