= Acree, Georgia =

Unincorporated community in Georgia, U.S.

Coordinates: 31°33′20″N 83°59′46″W

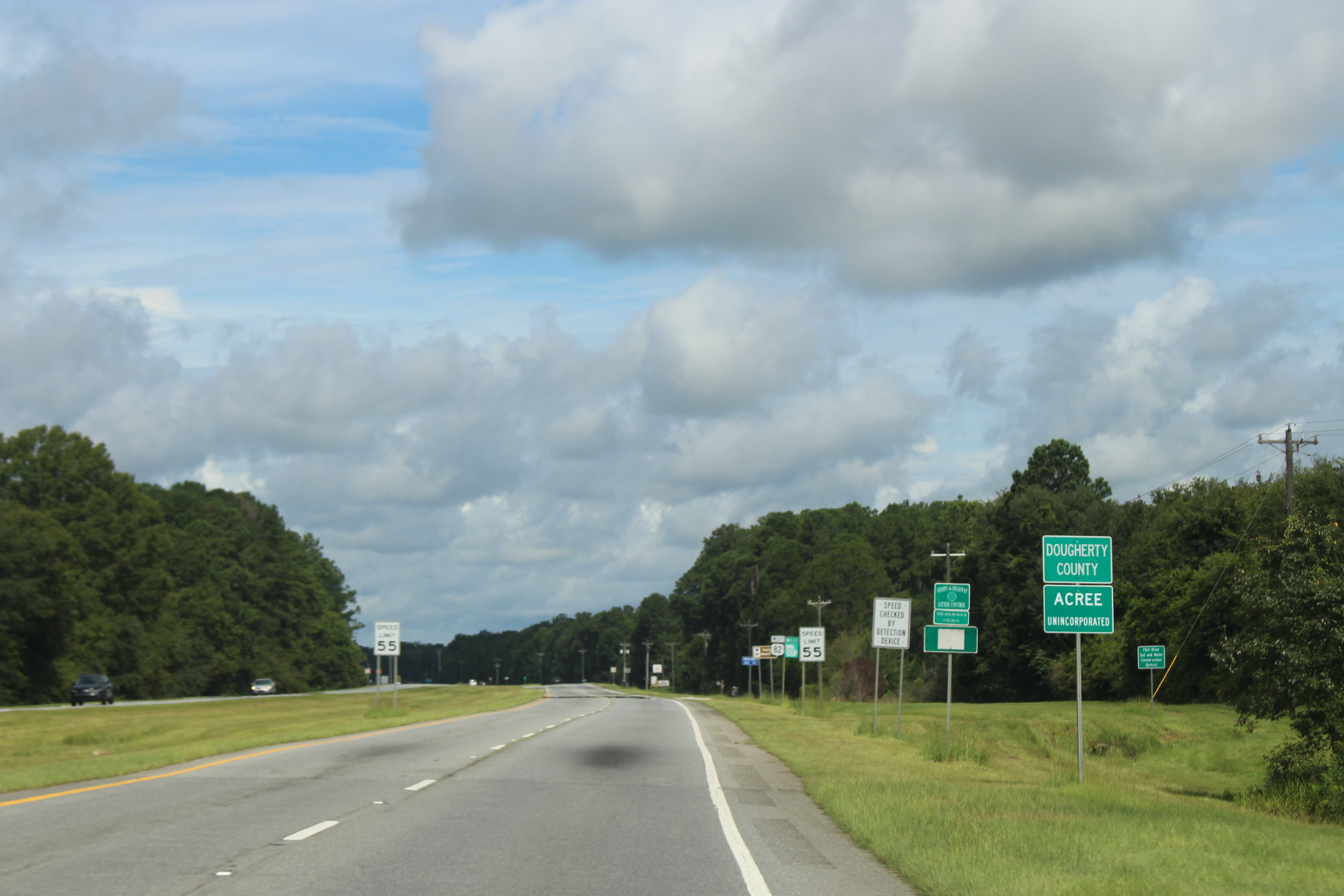
Acree is on U.S. Route 82 adjacent to the Dougherty County line

Acree is an unincorporated community in Dougherty County, in the U.S. state of Georgia.

== History ==
A post office called Acree was established in 1881, and remained in operation until 1955. A variant name was "Davis".
