= Pecan City, Georgia =

Unincorporated community in Georgia, U.S.

Coordinates: 31°31′04″N 84°04′12″W

Pecan City is an unincorporated community in Dougherty County, in the U.S. state of Georgia.

== History ==
A post office called Pecan City was established in 1911, and remained in operation until 1912. The community was so named on account of its location in a pecan-growing district.
