= Dawson, Georgia =

City in the United States

- City
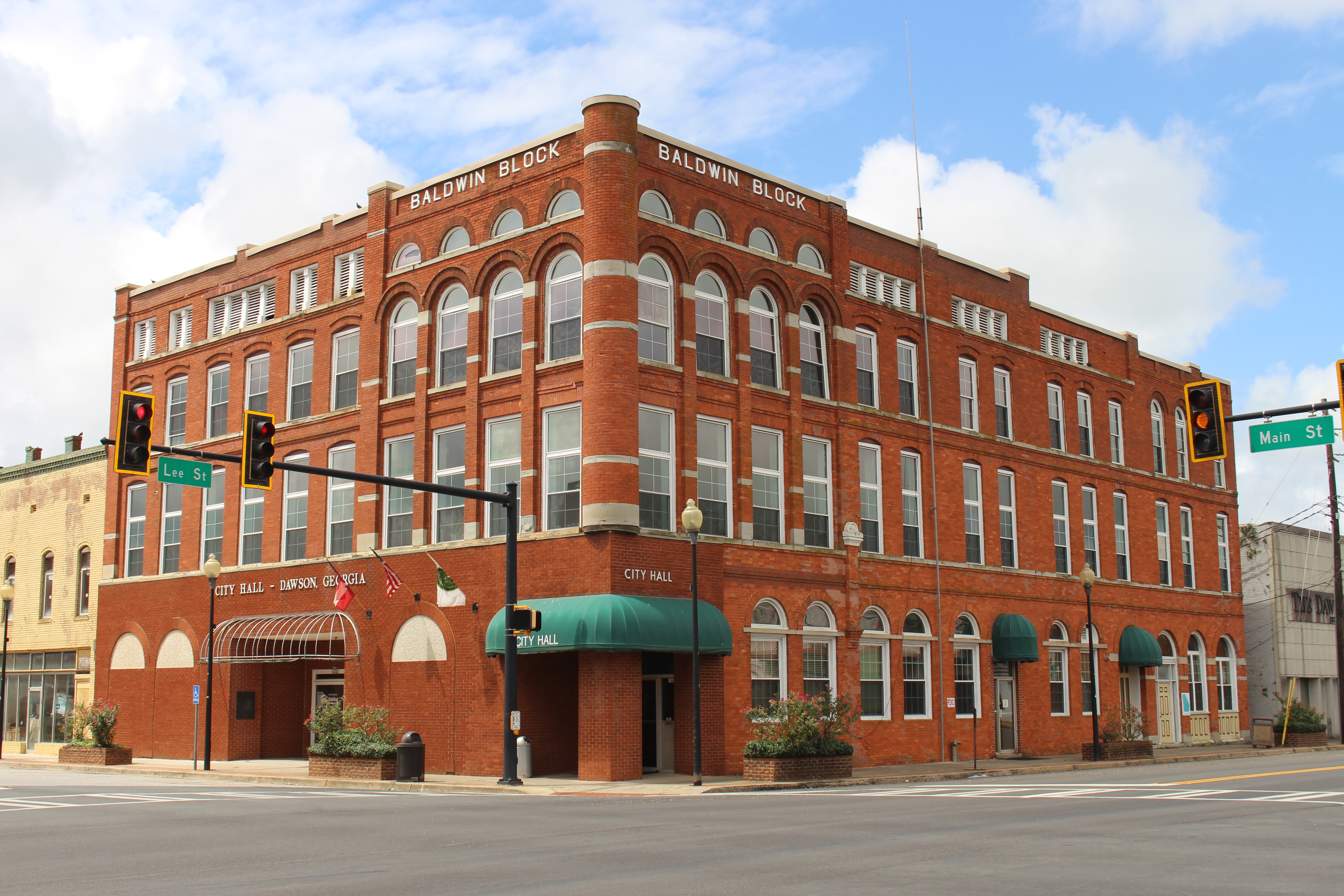
- Dawson City Hall

- Location in Terrell County and the state of Georgia
- Coordinates: 31°46′26″N 84°26′27″W
- Country: United States
- State: Georgia
- County: Terrell

Area
  - Total: 3.75 sq mi (9.72 km^{2})
  - Land: 3.75 sq mi (9.72 km^{2})
  - Water: 0 sq mi (0.00 km^{2})
- Elevation: 351 ft (107 m)

Population (2020)
  - Total: 4,414
  - Density: 1,176.5/sq mi (454.25/km^{2})
- Time zone: UTC-5 (Eastern (EST))
  - Summer (DST): UTC-4 (EDT)
- ZIP codes: 39842
- Area code: 229
- FIPS code: 13-21912
- GNIS feature ID: 0313367
- Website: https://cityofdawson.org/

Dawson is a city in and the county seat of Terrell County, Georgia, United States. Its population was 4,414 at the 2020 census. Incorporated on December 22, 1857, the city is named for Senator William Crosby Dawson. Dawson is part of the Albany, Georgia metropolitan area.

== History ==
Dawson was founded in 1856 as seat of the newly formed Terrell County. It was incorporated as a town in 1857 and as a city in 1872. Terrell was an important site in the 1960s, when the county in which it is located was labeled "Terrible Terrell" by the Student Nonviolent Coordinating Committee. Jackie Robinson helped raise money to rebuild three black churches that were burned in the area.

In 1976, five African-American youths were charged with the murder of a white customer in a roadside convenience store. The crime and pretrial proceedings garnered national attention. The five young men, one of whom was a juvenile, charged in the case were known as the "Dawson Five". The court dropped the charges against the group of five, Roosevelt Watson, Henderson Watson, J.D. Davenport, Johnnie B. Jackson, and George Poor, when it found evidence of police misconduct, including coerced confessions, intimidation, and improper identification procedures.

== Geography ==
Dawson is located in Southwest Georgia along U.S. Route 82 and Georgia State Route 520 (Columbus Highway), which leads southeast 8 mi (13 km) to Sasser and northwest 9 mi (14 km) to Parrott. U.S. 82 leads west 21 mi (34 km) to Cuthbert and 47 mi (76 km) to Eufaula, Alabama. Albany is 24 mi (39 km) southeast and Columbus is 63 mi (101 km) northwest.

The city is located at 31°46′26″N 84°26′27″W (31.773969, -84.440870). According to the United States Census Bureau, the city has a total area of 3.7 square miles (9.6 km^{2}), all land.

== Demographics ==
Historical population
Census	Pop.	Note	%±
1860	521		—
1870	1,099		110.9%
1880	1,576		43.4%
1890	2,284		44.9%
1900	2,926		28.1%
1910	3,827		30.8%
1920	3,504		−8.4%
1930	3,827		9.2%
1940	3,681		−3.8%
1950	4,411		19.8%
1960	5,062		14.8%
1970	5,383		6.3%
1980	5,699		5.9%
1990	5,295		−7.1%
2000	5,058		−4.5%
2010	4,540		−10.2%
2020	4,414		−2.8%
U.S. Decennial Census; 1850-1870 1870-1880; 1890-1910 1920-1930; 1940 1950 1960; 1970 1980 1990; 2000 2010

=== 2020 census ===
As of the 2020 census, Dawson had a population of 4,414. The median age was 38.8 years; 24.8% of residents were under 18 and 17.8% were 65 or older. For every 100 females, there were 84.3 males, and for every 100 females 18 and over, there were 77.4 males 18 and over.

None of the residents lived in urban areas, while 100.0% lived in rural areas.

Of the 1,749 households in Dawson, including 1,080 families, 31.0% had children under 18 living in them, 24.7% were married-couple households, 18.9% were households with a male householder and no spouse or partner present, and 49.2% were households with a female householder and no spouse or partner present. About 33.8% of all households were made up of individuals, and 14.6% had someone living alone who was 65 or older.

The city had 2,042 housing units, of which 14.3% were vacant. The homeowner vacancy rate was 3.2% and the rental vacancy rate was 4.3%.

Dawson racial composition as of 2020
Race	Number	Percentage
White (non-Hispanic)	613	13.89%
Black or African American (non-Hispanic)	3,618	81.97%
Native American	6	0.14%
Asian	44	1.0%
Pacific Islander	1	0.02%
Other/multiracial	88	1.99%
Hispanic or Latino	44	1.0%

== Education ==
=== Terrell County School District ===
The Terrell County School District holds preschool to grade 12 and consists of two elementary schools, a middle school, and a high school. The district had 98 full-time teachers and over 1,764 students in 2010.

- Cooper-Carver Elementary School
- Terrell County Middle High School

=== Private education ===
- Terrell Academy was founded as a segregation academy in response to the racial desegregation of public schools.

=== Higher education ===
Nearby Albany has two colleges to which students may easily commute: Albany State University, and Albany Technical College. To the west, in Cuthbert, is historic Andrew College. Also nearby is Georgia Southwestern State University in Americus.

== Notable people ==
- Lucius D. Battle (1918–2008), ambassador to Egypt
- James Brazier (c. 1926–1958), African American murdered by police in Dawson
- Lawrence Edward Carter Jr. (1941-), historian, professor, author, and civil rights expert, dean of the Martin Luther King Jr. International Chapel at Morehouse.
- Erle Cocke Jr (1921–2000), businessman, U.S. National Guard general
- Wayland Flowers (1939–1988), puppeteer best known for his puppet known as "Madame"
- Bessie Jones (1902–1984), gospel and folk singer
- Benjamin J. Davis Jr. (1903–1964), attorney who defended a man trying to organize a union from insurrection charges, elected as New York City councilman after moving there, Communist Party leader in 1930s
- Robert J. Jones, chancellor of the University of Illinois at Urbana-Champaign, former president of the State University of New York at Albany
- Otis Redding (1941–1967), singer, songwriter, record producer, arranger, and talent scout, considered one of the greatest singers in the history of American popular music, soul music, and rhythm and blues
- Cole Swindell (born 1983), American country music singer and songwriter
- Walter Washington, elected as first mayor of Washington, DC, after the city was granted home rule by Congress

== In popular culture ==
The fictional University of South Georgia, home of the South Georgia Catfish in Chad Powers, is located in Dawson.
