= Parrott, Georgia =

- Town
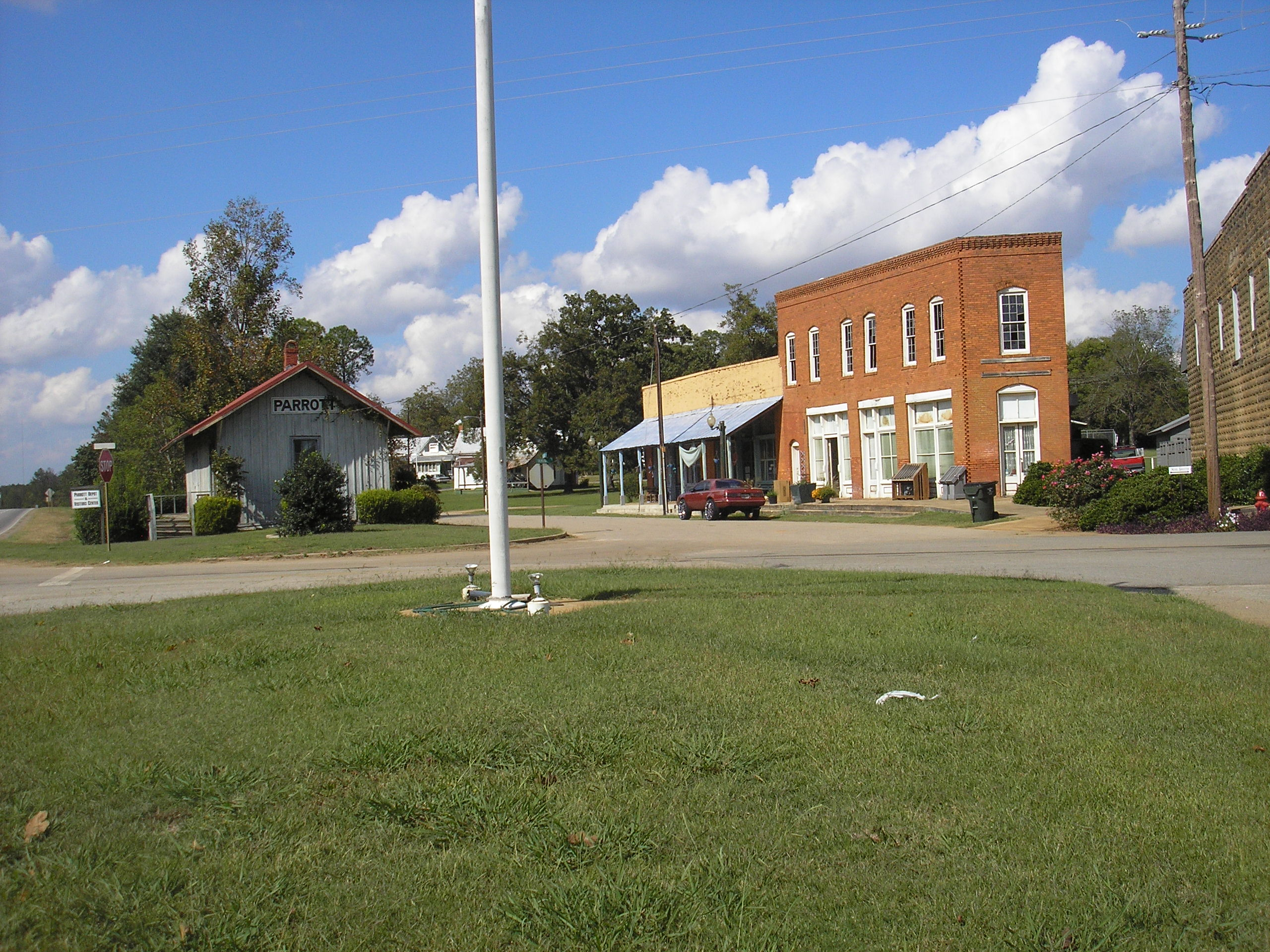
- Parrot Historic District

- Location in Terrell County and the state of Georgia
- Coordinates: 31°53′39″N 84°30′40″W
- Country: United States
- State: Georgia
- County: Terrell

Government
  - Type: Mayor-council government
  - Mayor: Jake Pritchard
  - Parrot City Council: Members: Michael Gayheart; Sally Loska; Teresa Satterfield; Walter Wade; Ernest Watson

Area
  - Total: 0.78 sq mi (2.02 km^{2})
  - Land: 0.78 sq mi (2.02 km^{2})
  - Water: 0 sq mi (0.00 km^{2})
- Elevation: 460 ft (140 m)

Population (2020)
  - Total: 120
  - Density: 153.9/sq mi (59.41/km^{2})
- Time zone: UTC-5 (Eastern (EST))
  - Summer (DST): UTC-4 (EDT)
- ZIP codes: 39877
- Area code: 229
- FIPS code: 13-59416
- GNIS feature ID: 0320249

Parrott is a town in Terrell County, Georgia, United States. The population was 158 as of the 2020 census. It is part of the Albany, Georgia metropolitan statistical area.

== History ==
Parrott was founded in the 1860s by James and John L. Parrott, pioneer citizens. The Georgia General Assembly incorporated Parrott as a town in 1889.

== Geography ==
The town is located in southwest Georgia along Georgia State Route 520 (South Georgia Parkway), which leads southeast 9 mi (14 km) to Dawson, the Terrell County seat, and northwest 18 mi (29 km) to Richland. Columbus is 53 mi (85 km) northwest and Albany is 34 mi (55 km) southeast. According to the United States Census Bureau, the town has a total area of 0.8 square miles (2.1 km^{2}), all land.

== Demographics ==
Historical population
Census	Pop.	Note	%±
1900	267		—
1910	360		34.8%
1920	367		1.9%
1930	383		4.4%
1940	337		−12.0%
1950	291		−13.6%
1960	280		−3.8%
1970	222		−20.7%
1980	222		0.0%
1990	140		−36.9%
2000	156		11.4%
2010	158		1.3%
2020	120		−24.1%
U.S. Decennial Census; 1850-1870 1870-1880; 1890-1910 1920-1930; 1940 1950 1960; 1970 1980 1990; 2000 2010

As of the census of 2000, there were 156 people, 68 households, and 41 families residing in the town. In 2020, its population declined to 120.

== Arts and culture ==
Parts of the 1980 western film The Long Riders were filmed in Parrot, notably the "Northfield" scene.

Artrain USA visited Parrott in 1976, one of the few non-metropolitan stops on its journey. The event was accompanied by a large arts and crafts show, along with craft demonstrations. Jimmy Carter attended the event to cut the ribbon and open the show, and gave a speech to commemorate the occasion.

== Notable people ==
- Bob Hanner, Georgia state legislator and businessman
- Joanna Moore, actress and mother of Tatum O'Neal
