= Bronwood, Georgia =

- Town
- Location in Terrell County and the state of Georgia
- Coordinates: 31°49′51″N 84°21′50″W
- Country: United States
- State: Georgia
- County: Terrell

Area
  - Total: 0.79 sq mi (2.05 km^{2})
  - Land: 0.79 sq mi (2.05 km^{2})
  - Water: 0 sq mi (0.00 km^{2})
- Elevation: 367 ft (112 m)

Population (2020)
  - Total: 334
  - Density: 422.6/sq mi (163.16/km^{2})
- Time zone: UTC-5 (Eastern (EST))
  - Summer (DST): UTC-4 (EDT)
- ZIP codes: 31726, 39826
- Area code: 229
- FIPS code: 13-10860
- GNIS feature ID: 0354864
- Website: https://www.cityofbronwood.com/

Bronwood is a town in Terrell County, Georgia, United States. As of the 2020 census, the city had a population of 334. It is part of the Albany, Georgia metropolitan statistical area.

== History ==
Bronwood was originally called "Brown's Station" in 1858, when the railroad was extended to that point, after one Mr. Brown, a railroad official. The Georgia General Assembly incorporated the place in 1883 as "Bronwood", with the town's limits extended in a one-mile radius from the depot at Brown's station.

== Geography ==
Bronwood is located at 31°49′51″N 84°21′50″W (31.830959, -84.363942). The closest cities are Dawson (six miles away), Americus 21 miles and Albany 25 miles. According to the United States Census Bureau, the town has a total area of 0.8 square miles (2.1 km^{2}), all land.

== Demographics ==
Historical population
Census	Pop.	Note	%±
1890	406		—
1900	359		−11.6%
1910	465		29.5%
1920	520		11.8%
1930	485		−6.7%
1940	437		−9.9%
1950	337		−22.9%
1960	400		18.7%
1970	500		25.0%
1980	524		4.8%
1990	513		−2.1%
2000	513		0.0%
2010	225		−56.1%
2020	334		48.4%
U.S. Decennial Census; 1850-1870 1870-1880; 1890-1910 1920-1930; 1940 1950 1960; 1970 1980 1990; 2000 2010

=== Racial and ethnic composition ===
Bronwood town, Georgia – Racial and ethnic composition Note: the US Census treats Hispanic/Latino as an ethnic category. This table excludes Latinos from the racial categories and assigns them to a separate category. Hispanics/Latinos may be of any race.
Race / Ethnicity (NH = Non-Hispanic)	Pop 2000	Pop 2010	Pop 2020	% 2000	% 2010	% 2020
White alone (NH)	168	62	92	32.75%	27.56%	27.54%
Black or African American alone (NH)	337	155	216	65.69%	68.89%	64.67%
Native American or Alaska Native alone (NH)	2	0	0	0.39%	0.00%	0.00%
Asian alone (NH)	0	0	0	0.00%	0.00%	0.00%
Native Hawaiian or Pacific Islander alone (NH)	0	0	0	0.00%	0.00%	0.00%
Other race alone (NH)	0	0	0	0.00%	0.00%	0.00%
Mixed race or Multiracial (NH)	0	0	8	0.00%	0.00%	2.40%
Hispanic or Latino (any race)	6	8	18	1.17%	3.56%	5.39%
Total	513	225	334	100.00%	100.00%	100.00%

=== 2020 census ===
In 2020, it had a population of 334, up from 225 in 2010.
