= Flint River =

River in Georgia, United States

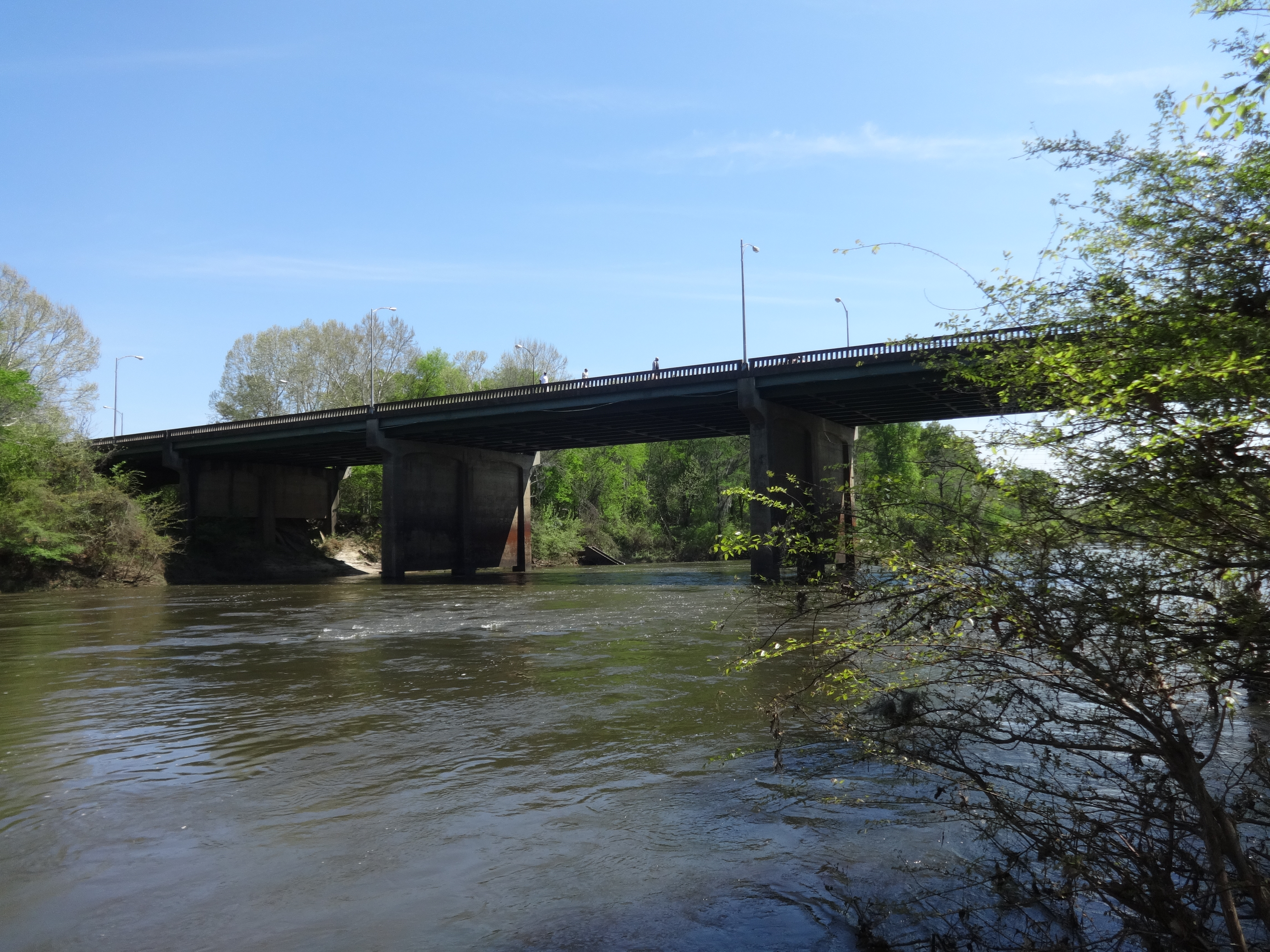
- The Flint River in Albany, Georgia

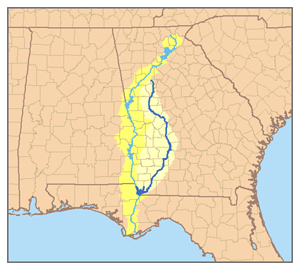
- Map of the Apalachicola River system with the Flint River in dark blue and its watershed highlighted.

Physical characteristics
- Source: Flint River
  - location: College Park, Georgia
  - coordinates: 33°40′08″N 84°26′24″W
  - elevation: 1,027 ft (313 m)
- Mouth: Apalachicola River
  - location: Lake Seminole
  - coordinates: 30°43′44″N 84°52′30″W
  - elevation: 77 ft (23 m)
- Length: 344 mi (554 km)
- Basin size: 8,460 sq mi (21,900 km^{2})

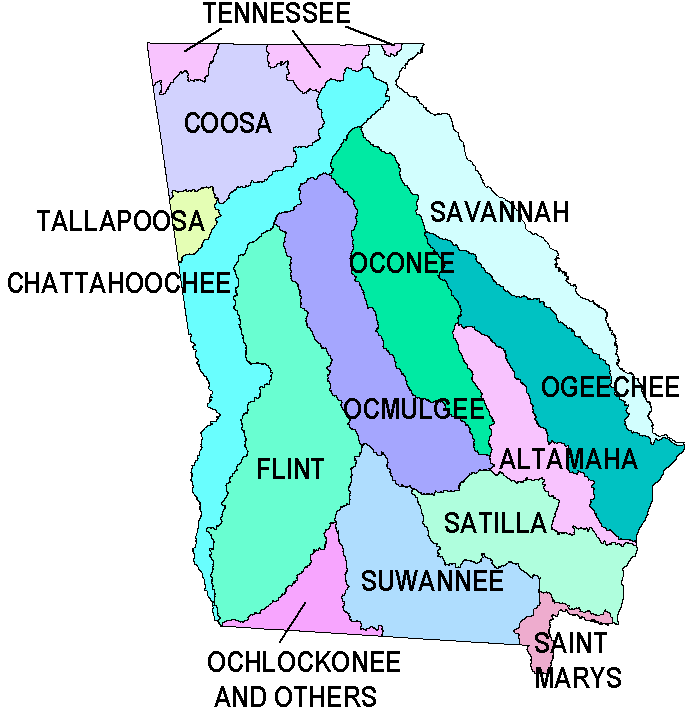
Map showing the Flint River Basin and other river basins in Georgia

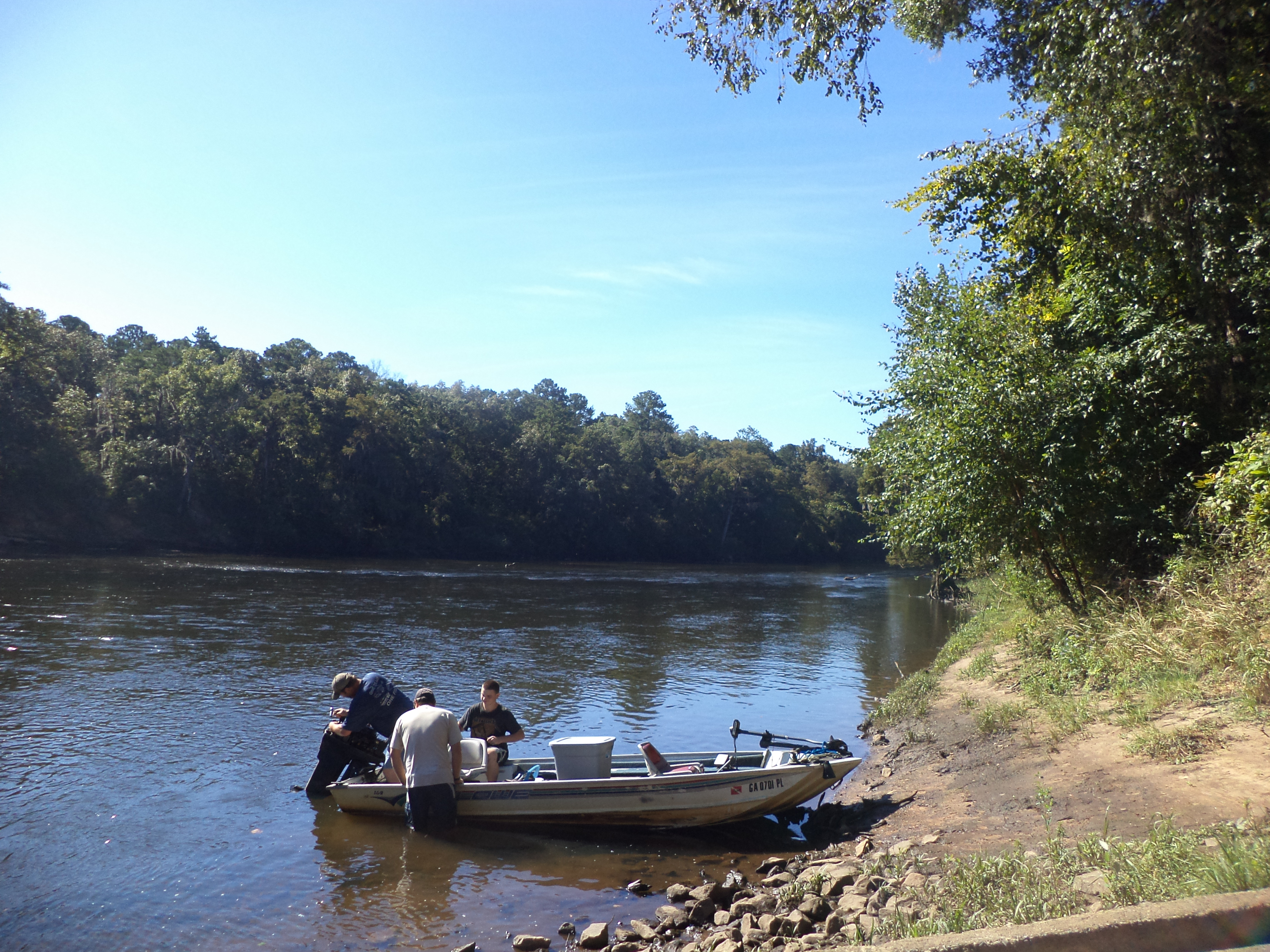
Boaters on the Flint River in Dougherty County

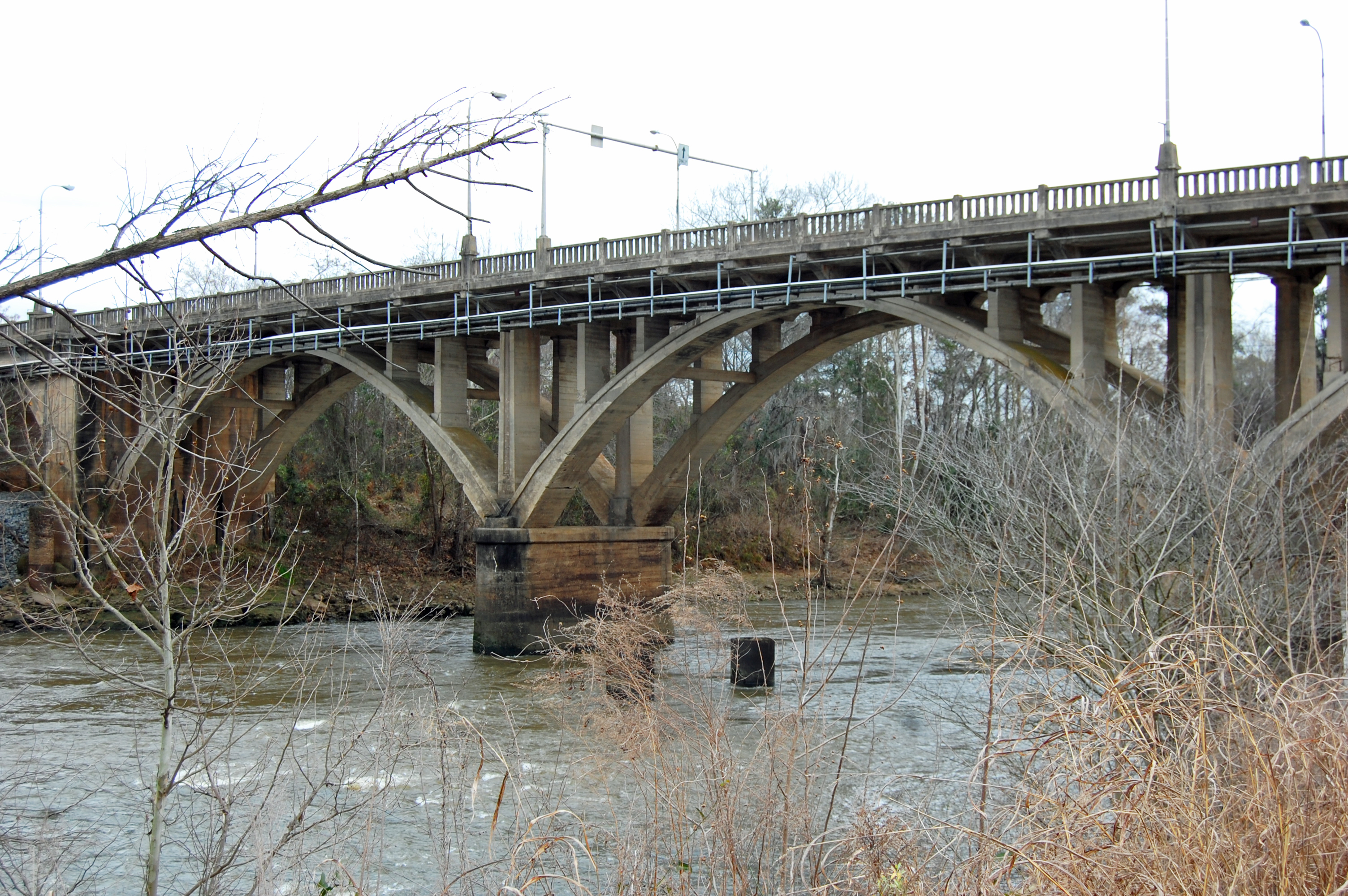
The bridge of US 82 over the Flint River in Albany, Georgia

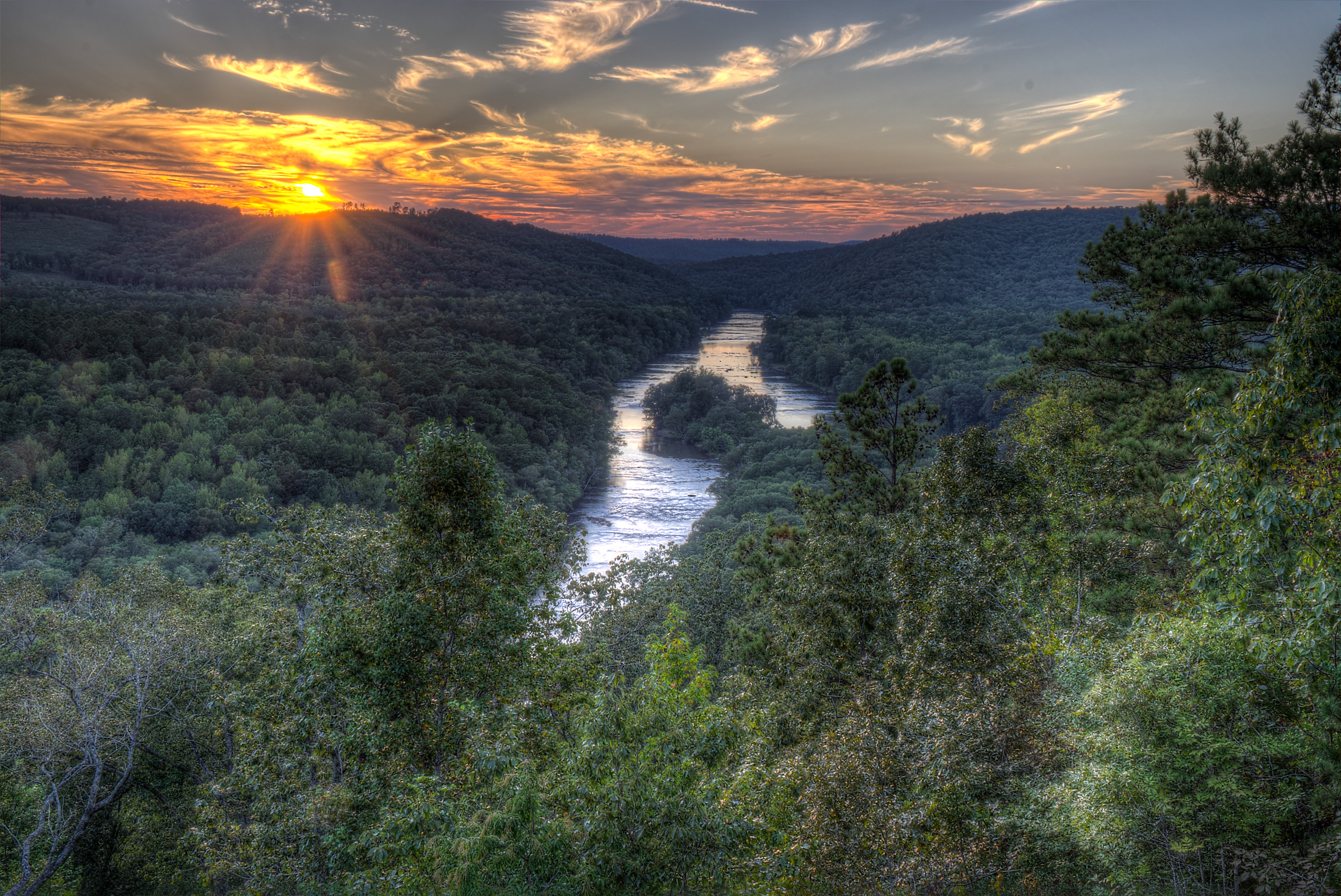
Flint River at Sprewell Bluff Park

The Flint River is a 344-mile-long (554 km) river in the U.S. state of Georgia. The river drains 8,460 square miles (21,900 km^{2}) of western Georgia, flowing south from the upper Piedmont region south of Atlanta to the wetlands of the Gulf Coastal Plain in the southwestern corner of the state. Along with the Apalachicola and the Chattahoochee rivers, it forms part of the ACF basin. In its upper course through the red hills of the Piedmont, it is considered especially scenic, flowing unimpeded for over 200 miles (320 km). Historically, it was also called the Thronateeska River.

== Description ==
The Flint River rises in west central Georgia in the city of East Point in southern Fulton County on the southern outskirts of the Atlanta metropolitan area as ground seepage. The exact start can be traced to the field located between Plant Street, Willingham Drive, Elm Street, and Vesta Avenue. It travels under the runways of the Hartsfield-Jackson Atlanta International Airport. Flowing generally south through rural western Georgia, the river is fed by Line Creek, and Whitewater Creek in Fayette County. The river passes through Sprewell Bluff State Park, approximately 10 miles (16 km) west of Thomaston. Farther south, it comes within 5 miles (8 km) of Andersonville, the site of the Andersonville prison during the Civil War.

In southwestern Georgia, the river flows through downtown Albany, the largest city on the river. At Bainbridge it joins Lake Seminole, formed at its confluence with the Chattahoochee River upstream from the Jim Woodruff Dam, very near the Florida state line. From this confluence, the Apalachicola River flows south from the reservoir through Florida to the Gulf of Mexico.

The Flint River is fed by Kinchafoonee Creek just north of Albany, and by Ichawaynochaway Creek in southwestern Mitchell County, approximately 15 miles (24 km) northeast of Bainbridge.

In addition to Lake Seminole, the Flint River is impounded approximately 15 miles (24 km) upstream from Albany to form the Lake Blackshear reservoir.

The Flint River is one of only 40 rivers in the nation to flow more than 200 miles (320 km) unimpeded by dams or other manmade systems, and is increasingly valued for that. In the 1970s, a plan by the U.S. Army Corps of Engineers to build a dam at Sprewell Bluff in Upson County was defeated by Jimmy Carter, then the Governor of Georgia, and other supporters. Carter's hometown of Plains is located near the Flint River.

== Natural history ==
The river is considered to have three distinct sections as it flows southward through western Georgia. In its upper reaches in the red hills of the Piedmont, it flows through a deeply incised channel etched into crystalline rocks. South of its fall line near Culloden, the channel transforms to a broad, forested swampy flood plain. South of Lake Blackshear, it transforms again, flowing through a channel in limestone rock above the Upper Floridan Aquifer below southwestern Georgia and northwestern Florida.

The river has been prone to floods throughout its history. In 1994, during flooding from Tropical Storm Alberto, the river crested at 43 feet (13 m) in Albany, resulting in the emergency evacuation of over 23,000 residents. It caused one of the worst natural disasters in the state's history. Interstate 75 was closed in Macon, and Albany State University was also seriously flooded, as the river became a few miles or several kilometers wide in some places. The water lifted caskets from cemeteries and left them, along with drowned cattle and other livestock, stuck in trees and other places.

Montezuma, Georgia was completely inundated after the Flint River topped the 29-foot levee protecting the town from floodwater. The official depth of the river at the height of the flood was estimated at 34 feet. The nearby gauge was underwater, making it impossible to get an accurate reading. Cleanup and restoration of Albany took months to complete. In 1998 another serious flood occurred in Albany, but it was not as damaging as the one of 1994. Bainbridge also flooded in 1998. Other significant floods occurred in 1841 and 1925.

In January 2002, a winter storm blew through Atlanta the day after New Year's Day. The airport's drainage system overflowed, resulting in deicing fluid leaking into the river. Although the antifreeze entered the drinking water of some residents, no one became seriously ill. The airport changed its drainage system to prevent the problem in the future. No problems were reported after an unusually heavy 4 inches (10 cm) of rain officially fell at the airport at the beginning of March 2009.

In May 2009, the National Fish Habitat Action Plan named the Lower Flint River one of its "10 Waters to Watch" for 2009 for its habitat restoration work. In October 2009, American Rivers placed the Flint on its list of America's Most Endangered Rivers, mainly due to new plans to put a dam on it.

The Flint is one of four rivers in the southeast with significant remaining populations of Hymenocallis coronaria, the Shoals spider-lily. Four separate stands of the plant have been studied and documented in the river, ranging from Yellow Jacket Shoals to Hightower Shoals.

== In popular culture ==
In Gone With the Wind, author Margaret Mitchell describes the Flint River as bordering the fictional plantation Tara.

American country music singer Luke Bryan, a native of Georgia, references the river in his songs "That's My Kind of Night"; "Huntin', Fishin' & Lovin' Every Day"; ”Kick the Dust Up”, which mentions the Georgia State Route 32 Bridge over the river; and "We Rode in Trucks".

== See also ==
- List of Georgia rivers
- Finding the Flint
