= Sasser, Georgia =

- Town
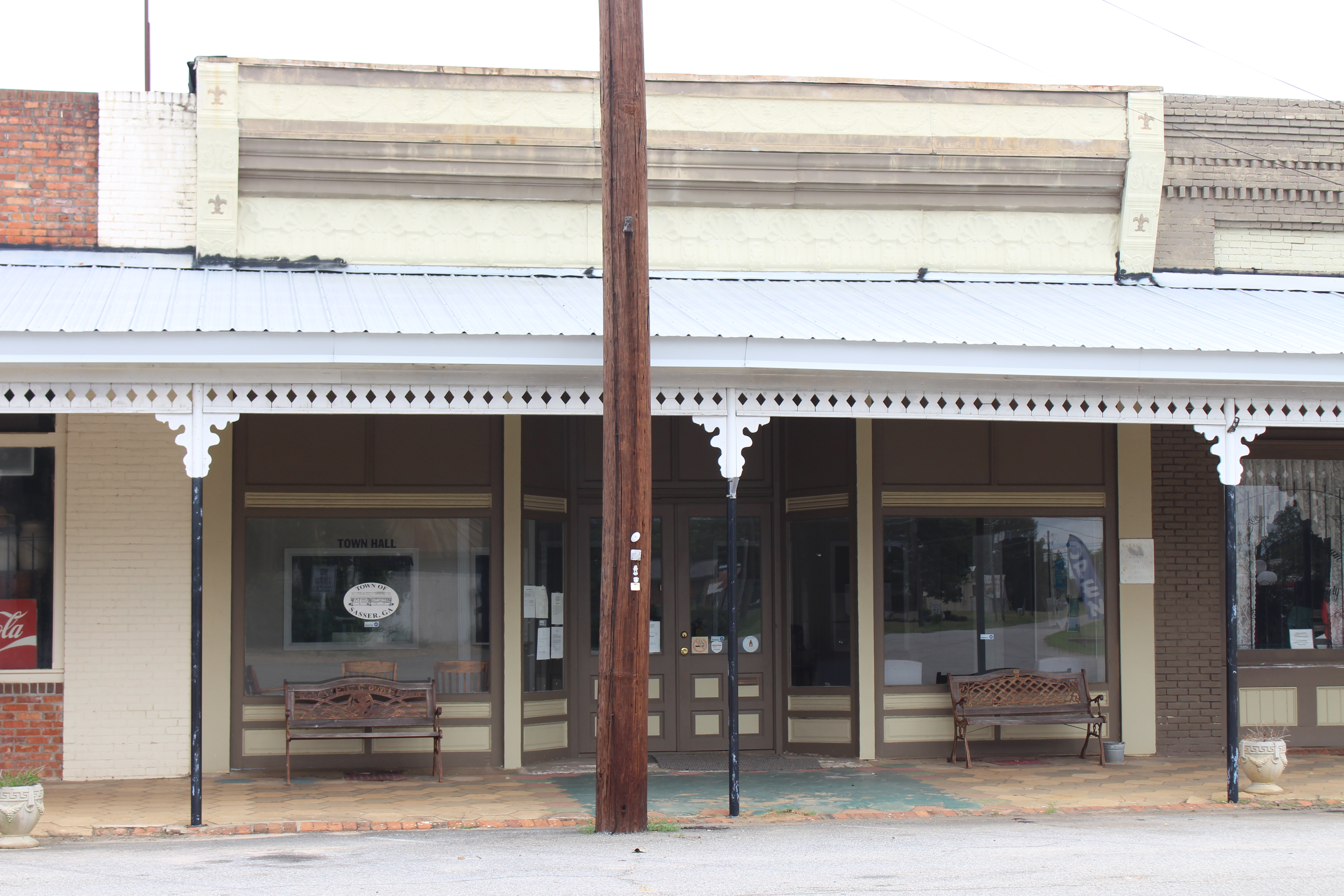
- Sasser Town Hall in Sasser Commercial Historic District

- Location in Terrell County and the state of Georgia
- Coordinates: 31°43′12″N 84°20′52″W
- Country: United States
- State: Georgia
- County: Terrell

Area
  - Total: 0.78 sq mi (2.02 km^{2})
  - Land: 0.78 sq mi (2.02 km^{2})
  - Water: 0 sq mi (0.00 km^{2})
- Elevation: 318 ft (97 m)

Population (2020)
  - Total: 287
  - Density: 368/sq mi (141.9/km^{2})
- Time zone: UTC-5 (Eastern (EST))
  - Summer (DST): UTC-4 (EDT)
- ZIP codes: 31785, 39885
- Area code: 229
- FIPS code: 13-68796
- GNIS feature ID: 0332984
- Website: https://townofsasserga.gov/

Sasser is a town in Terrell County, Georgia, United States. As of the 2020 census, Sasser had a population of 287. It is part of the Albany, Georgia metropolitan statistical area.

== History ==
A post office called Sasser was established in 1881. The Georgia General Assembly incorporated Sasser as a town in 1890. The community has the name of one William Sasser.

== Geography ==
Sasser water tower

Sasser is located at 31°43′12″N 84°20′52″W (31.720119, -84.347676). According to the United States Census Bureau, the town has a total area of 0.8 square miles (2.1 km^{2}), all land.

== Demographics ==
Historical population
Census	Pop.	Note	%±
1900	322		—
1910	441		37.0%
1920	402		−8.8%
1930	412		2.5%
1940	365		−11.4%
1950	371		1.6%
1960	382		3.0%
1970	339		−11.3%
1980	407		20.1%
1990	335		−17.7%
2000	393		17.3%
2010	279		−29.0%
2020	287		2.9%
U.S. Decennial Census; 1850-1870 1870-1880; 1890-1910 1920-1930; 1940 1950 1960; 1970 1980 1990; 2000 2010

As of the census of 2000, there were 393 people, 152 households, and 112 families residing in the town. In 2020, its population declined to 287.
