= 2020–21 United States Senate election in Georgia =

- November 3, 2020 (first round); January 5, 2021 (runoff)
- Turnout: 65.4% ▲ (first round); 61.5% ▼ (runoff)
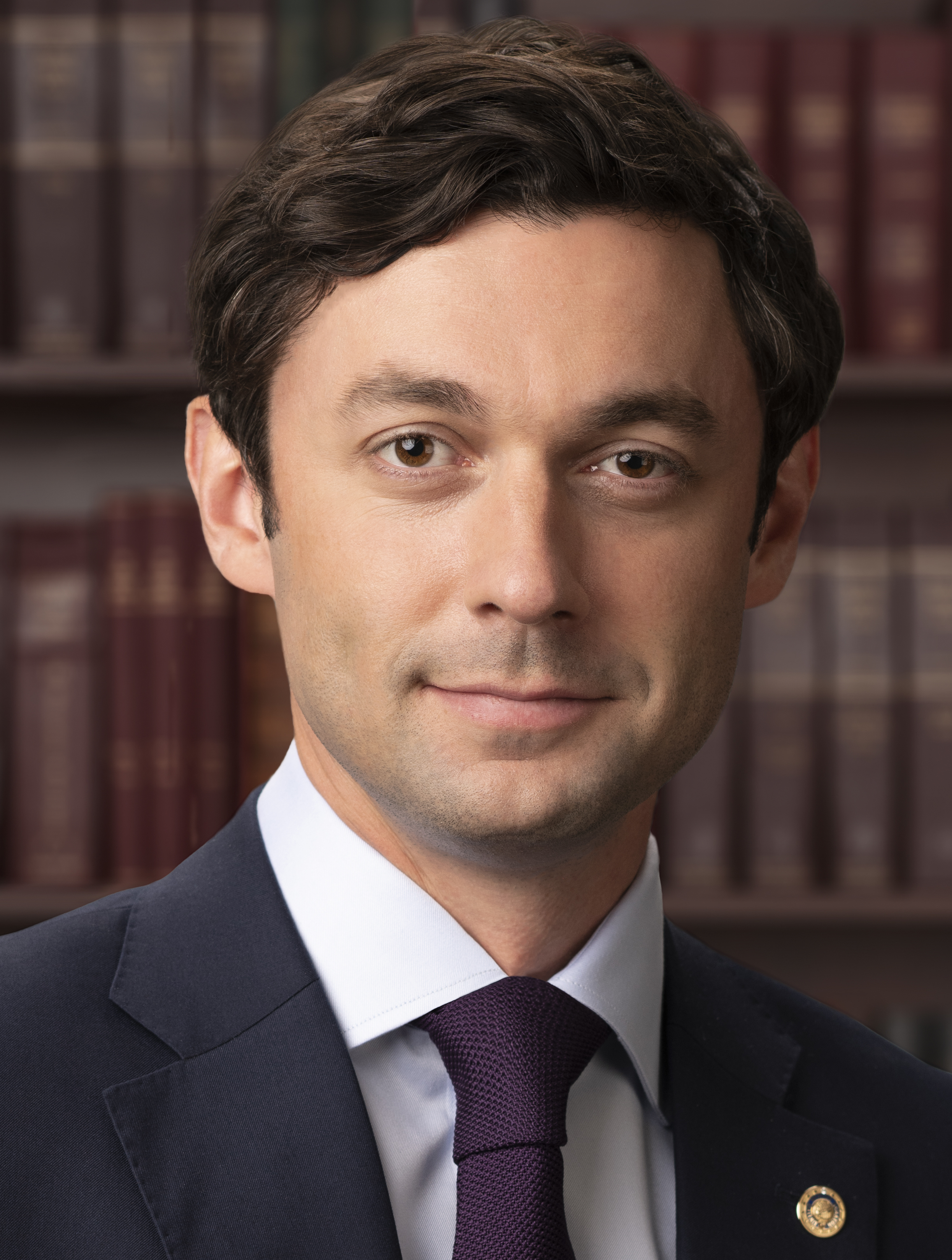

Candidate	Jon Ossoff	David Perdue
Party	Democratic	Republican
First round	2,374,519; 47.95%	2,462,617; 49.73%
Runoff	2,269,923; 50.61%	2,214,979; 49.39%
- Ossoff: 40–50% 50–60% 60–70% 70–80% 80–90% >90% Perdue: 40–50% 50–60% 60–70% 70–80% 80–90% >90% Tie: 40–50% 50% No data
U.S. senator before election
David Perdue
Republican
Elected U.S. Senator
Jon Ossoff
Democratic

The 2020–21 United States Senate election in Georgia was held on November 3, 2020, and on January 5, 2021 (as a runoff), to elect the Class II member of the United States Senate to represent the State of Georgia. Democrat Jon Ossoff narrowly defeated incumbent Republican Senator David Perdue in the runoff election, despite Perdue receiving more votes in the first round. The general election was held concurrently with the 2020 presidential election, as well as with other elections to the Senate, elections to the U.S. House of Representatives and various state and local elections.

No candidate received a majority of the vote during the general election on November 3, so the top two finishers—Perdue (49.7%) and Ossoff (47.9%)—advanced to a runoff election, held on January 5, 2021. The runoff was held concurrently with the special election for Georgia's other U.S. Senate seat (which had also advanced to a runoff), in which Republican incumbent Kelly Loeffler lost to Democratic nominee Raphael Warnock. After the general round of elections, Republicans held 50 Senate seats and the Democratic caucus 48 (including two independents who caucus with them). As a result, the two runoffs decided control of the Senate under the incoming Biden administration. By winning both seats, Democrats took control of the chamber, with Vice President Kamala Harris's tie-breaking vote giving them an effective majority. The extraordinarily high political stakes caused the races to attract significant attention nationwide and globally. On January 6, 2021, most major news outlets projected Ossoff the winner, in the midst of the US Capitol riot. Perdue conceded the race on January 8. According to OpenSecrets, this campaign had been the most expensive in U.S. Senate history, with over $468 million spent. Ossoff's victory, along with Warnock's, gave the Democrats control of the Senate for the first time since 2015. Ossoff and Warnock became the first Democrats to be elected to the U.S. Senate from Georgia since Zell Miller in a 2000 special election.

Ossoff became the first Democrat elected to a full term in the Senate from Georgia since Max Cleland, who held this seat from 1997 to 2003, and the first Jewish member of the Senate from the state. Ossoff became the youngest senator since Don Nickles won in 1980, and the youngest Democrat since Joe Biden won in 1972. Georgia election officials certified Ossoff's victory on January 19, 2021; he was sworn in on January 20. Ossoff is the first Jewish senator from the Deep South since Benjamin F. Jonas of Louisiana, who was elected in 1878, and the first millennial United States senator. The two elections mark the first time since the 1994 United States Senate election in Tennessee and the concurrent special election that both Senate seats in a state have flipped from one party to the other in a single election cycle. This was also the first time the Democrats achieved this since West Virginia's 1958 Senate elections. With a margin of 1.2%, this election was also the closest race of the 2020 Senate election cycle. Following his election loss, Perdue ran in the 2022 Georgia gubernatorial election but lost in the Republican primary to incumbent Brian Kemp. Perdue would later go on to be nominated as the U.S. ambassador to China following Donald Trump's victory in the 2024 presidential election.

== Republican primary ==
=== Candidates ===
==== Nominee ====
- David Perdue, incumbent U.S. senator

==== Withdrawn ====
- James Jackson
- Michael Jowers, veteran
- Ervan Katari Miller, perennial candidate

==== Declined ====
- Derrick Grayson, activist and U.S. Senate candidate in 2014 and 2016. (ran in the special Class 3 seat).

==== Results ====
Republican primary results, June 9, 2020
Party	Candidate	Votes	%
Republican	David Perdue (incumbent)	992,555	100.00%
Total votes		992,555	100.00%

== Democratic primary ==
=== Candidates ===
==== Nominee ====
- Jon Ossoff, investigative journalist, media executive, nominee for Georgia's 6th congressional district in 2017

==== Eliminated in primary ====
- Teresa Tomlinson, former mayor of Columbus
- Sarah Riggs Amico, nominee for Lieutenant Governor of Georgia in 2018
- Marckeith DeJesus, candidate for Georgia State Senate in 2017 and candidate for Georgia House of Representatives in 2016
- Maya Dillard-Smith, former two-term Senate Appointee Judge over judicial performance and Rules Committee Chair
- James Knox, retired U.S. Air Force officer
- Tricia Carpenter McCracken, journalist and nominee for Georgia's 12th congressional district in 2016

==== Withdrew ====
- Akhenaten Amun, high school teacher
- Harold Shouse
- Ted Terry, mayor of Clarkston (endorsed Ossoff)
- Elaine Whigham Williams, pastor and candidate for president in 2016

==== Declined ====
- Stacey Abrams, nominee for governor of Georgia in 2018 and former minority leader of the Georgia House of Representatives (endorsed Ossoff)
- Jason Carter, grandson of former Georgia Governor and President Jimmy Carter, former state senator, and nominee for governor of Georgia in 2014 (endorsed Tomlinson)
- Stacey Evans, former state representative and candidate for governor of Georgia in 2018 (ran for state house)
- Scott Holcomb, state representative
- Jen Jordan, state senator
- Michelle Nunn, nominee for U.S. Senate in 2014 and daughter of former Senator Sam Nunn
- Kasim Reed, former mayor of Atlanta
- Doug Teper, former state representative
- Sally Yates, former United States Deputy Attorney General

=== Polling ===
Poll source	Date(s) administered	Sample size	Margin of error	Sarah Riggs Amico	Jon Ossoff	Teresa Tomlinson	Other	Undecided
Landmark Communications	June 1, 2020	500 (LV)	± 4.4%	9%	42%	14%	7% (Note: "Another candidate" with 7.2%)	28%
Cygnal (R)	May 28–30, 2020	510 (LV)	± 4.3%	8%	49%	16%	4% (Note: Knox with 1.5%; DeJesus and Smith with 1%; McCracken with 0.3%)	24%
The Progress Campaign (D)	May 6–15, 2020	1,162 (LV)	–	9%	46%	29%	–	16% (Note: Listed as "other/undecided")
The Progress Campaign (D)	March 12–21, 2020	913 (RV)	± 4.6%	18%	34%	21%	27% (Note: Includes undecided)	–
University of Georgia	March 4–14, 2020	807 (LV)	± 3.4%	15%	31%	16%	–	39%

==== Head-to-head polling ====
Poll source	Date(s) administered	Sample size	Margin of error	Jon Ossoff	Teresa Tomlinson	Undecided
Cygnal (R)	May 28–30, 2020	510 (LV)	± 4.3%	58%	24%	18%

=== Endorsements ===
Jon Ossoff

U.S. representatives

- Hank Johnson, U.S. representative for GA-04
- John Lewis, U.S. representative for GA-05 (deceased)

State legislators

- Debra Bazemore, state representative
- Sharon Beasley-Teague, state representative
- Karen Bennett, state representative
- Rhonda Burnough, state representative
- Doreen Carter, state representative
- Steve Henson, state senator and Senate Minority Leader
- Shelly Hutchinson, state representative
- Derrick Jackson, state representative
- Donzella James, state senator
- Emanuel Jones, state senator (previously endorsed Teresa Tomlinson)
- Sheila Jones, state representative
- Josh McLaurin, state representative
- Miriam Paris, state representative and former state senator
- Doc Rhett, state senator
- Kim Schofield, state representative
- Erica Thomas, state representative

Local officials

- Ted Terry, mayor of Clarkston and former 2020 U.S. Senate candidate

Organizations

- End Citizens United
- Let America Vote
Teresa Tomlinson

Federal officials

- Max Cleland, former U.S. senator (GA) (1997–2003), former secretary of state of Georgia (1983–1996), former Administrator of Veterans Affairs (1977–1981), and former secretary of the American Battle Monuments Commission (2009–2017)
- Buddy Darden, former U.S. representative for GA-07 (1983–1995)
- Gordon Giffin, former United States Ambassador to Canada (1997–2001)
- Andrew Young, former mayor of Atlanta (1982–1990), former U.S. ambassador to the United Nations (1977–1979), and U.S. representative for GA-05 (1973–1977)

State officials

- Roy Barnes, former governor of Georgia (1999–2003)
- Debbie Buckner, state representative
- Gail Buckner, former state senator, former state representative, and Democratic nominee in 2006 Georgia Secretary of State election
- Jason Carter, former state senator, Democratic nominee in 2014 Georgia governor's election, and grandson of the 39th President of the United States and former governor of Georgia, Jimmy Carter
- J. Craig Gordon, state representative
- Carolyn Hugley, state representative
- Lester G. Jackson, state senator
- Harold V. Jones II, state senator
- Mary Margaret Oliver, state representative and former state senator
- Leah Ward Sears, former associate justice of the Georgia Supreme Court (1992–2005) and former chief justice (2005–2009)
- Freddie Sims, state senator and former state representative

Local officials

- Hardie Davis, mayor of Augusta
- Kelly Girtz, mayor of Athens-Clarke County
- Ceasar Mitchell, former president of the Atlanta City Council
- Felicia Moore, president of the Atlanta City Council

Individuals

- Hank Aaron, retired right-fielder for the Atlanta Braves
- Lil Yachty, Atlanta rapper, singer and songwriter

Organizations

- Democracy for America
- National Organization for Women
Sarah Riggs Amico

Labor unions

- BAC Local 8 Southeast
- Communication Workers of America
- International Brotherhood of Electrical Workers Local 613
- SMART
- Southeastern Carpenters Regional Council

=== Results ===
County results Ossoff: Ossoff—60–70%; Ossoff—50–60%; Ossoff—40–50%; Ossoff—30–40%; Ossoff—<30%; Ossoff/Riggs Amico tie: Ossoff/Riggs Amico tie—<30%; Tomlinson: Tomlinson—60–70%; Tomlinson—50–60%; Tomlinson—40–50%; Tomlinson—30–40%; Tomlinson—<30%; Riggs Amico: Riggs Amico—30–40%; Riggs Amico—<30%; Smith: Smith—30–40%; Smith—<30%; Knox: Knox—<30%

Almost four times as many Georgia voters participated in the 2020 Democratic Senate primary as in the 2016 primary, when only 310,053 votes were cast.

Democratic primary results, June 9, 2020
Party	Candidate	Votes	%
Democratic	Jon Ossoff	626,819	52.82%
Democratic	Teresa Tomlinson	187,416	15.79%
Democratic	Sarah Riggs Amico	139,574	11.76%
Democratic	Maya Dillard-Smith	105,000	8.85%
Democratic	James Knox	49,452	4.17%
Democratic	Marckeith DeJesus	45,936	3.87%
Democratic	Tricia Carpenter McCracken	32,463	2.74%
Total votes		1,186,660	100.00%

== Other candidates ==
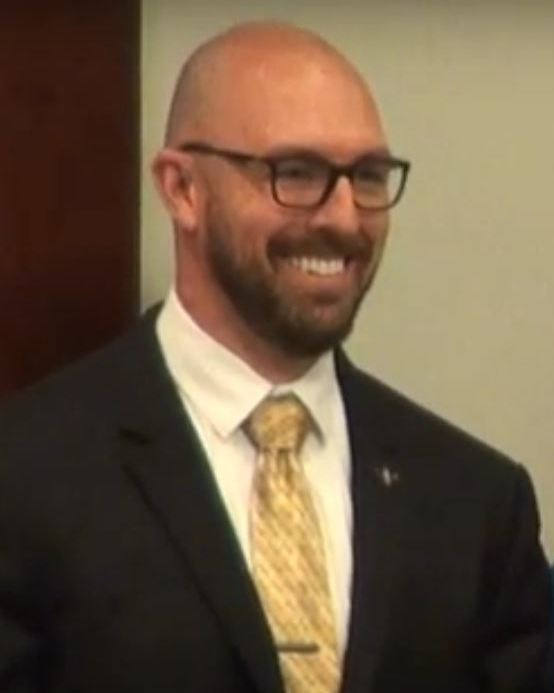
Hazel in 2018

=== Libertarian Party ===
==== Nominee ====
- Shane Hazel, former U.S. Marine, podcaster, and Republican candidate for Georgia's 7th congressional district in 2018

=== Independents ===
==== Withdrawn ====
- Elbert "Al" Bartell, perennial candidate (ran as an independent candidate in the special Class 3 seat)
- Allen Buckley, Libertarian candidate for 2016 (ran as an independent candidate in the special Class 3 seat)
- Tom Jones
- Clifton Kilby
- Darrell McGuire (write-in candidate), retired Georgia State Trooper
- Valencia Stovall, Georgian Democratic state representative from District 74 since 2013 (ran as an independent candidate in the special Class 3 seat)

== General election ==
=== Debates ===
The first debate between Hazel, Ossoff, and Perdue occurred virtually on October 12.

A second debate between Ossoff and Perdue, held on October 28 (Note: Initially scheduled for October 19.) in Savannah and aired on television station WTOC-TV, was more heated and made national headlines, with Ossoff saying that Perdue had claimed "COVID-19 was no deadlier than the flu", was "looking after [his] own assets, and ... portfolio", and that Perdue voted "four times to end protections for preexisting conditions". Ossoff also called Perdue a "crook" and criticized him for "attacking the health of the people that [he] represent[s]". Perdue said Ossoff will "say and do anything to my friends in Georgia to mislead them about how radical and socialist" his agenda is. Video of the exchange went viral.

The next day, October 29, Perdue said he would not attend the third and final debate, previously scheduled to be broadcast on WSB-TV on November 1; instead Perdue decided to attend a rally with President Donald Trump in Rome on the same day—"as lovely as another debate listening to Jon Ossoff lie to the people of Georgia sounds", according to a Perdue spokesman.

On December 6, Ossoff debated an empty podium as Perdue declined to participate in a Georgia Public Broadcasting-held debate. Ossoff criticized Perdue's absence, accusing him of skipping the event because of the negative response to his performance in the October debates.

=== Predictions ===
Source	Ranking	As of
DDHQ	Tossup	November 3, 2020
FiveThirtyEight	Tossup	November 2, 2020
Inside Elections	Tossup	October 28, 2020
Sabato's Crystal Ball	Tossup	November 2, 2020
RCP	Tossup	October 23, 2020
The Cook Political Report	Tossup	October 29, 2020
Economist	Tossup	November 2, 2020
Politico	Tossup	November 2, 2020
Daily Kos	Tossup	October 30, 2020

=== Post-primary endorsements ===
David Perdue (R)

U.S. executive branch officials

- Donald Trump, 45th president of the United States (2017–2021)
- George W. Bush, 43th president of the United States (2001–2009)

U.S. senators

- Saxby Chambliss, U.S. senator from Georgia (2003–2015)
- Johnny Isakson, U.S. senator from Georgia (2005–2019)
- Mack Mattingly, U.S. senator from Georgia (1981–1987)
- Tim Scott, U.S. senator from South Carolina (2013–present)

State officials

- Larry Hogan, Governor of Maryland (2015–2023)
- John F. King, Georgia Insurance and Safety Fire Commissioner and former Doraville chief of police
- Brad Raffensperger, Secretary of State of Georgia (2019–present)

Organizations

- Campaign for Working Families
- Council for Citizens Against Government Waste Political Action Committee (CCAGW PAC)
- Georgia Chamber of Commerce
- Huck PAC
- National Federation of Independent Business
- NRA Political Victory Fund
- National Right to Life Committee
- Republican Jewish Coalition
- Senate Conservatives Fund
Jon Ossoff (D)

U.S. executive branch officials

- Barack Obama, 44th president of the United States (2009–2017), U.S. senator from Illinois (2005–2008)
- Joe Biden, president-elect of the United States, 47th vice president of the United States (2009–2017), U.S. senator from Delaware (1973–2009)
- Kamala Harris, vice president-elect of the United States, U.S. senator from California (2017–2021)
- Hillary Clinton, former U.S. Secretary of State (2009–2013), U.S. Senator from New York (2001–2009), first lady of the United States (1993–2001) and 2016 Democratic nominee for president.

U.S. senators

- Cory Booker, U.S. senator from New Jersey (2013–present)
- Catherine Cortez Masto, U.S. senator from Nevada (2017–present)
- Amy Klobuchar, U.S. senator from Minnesota, 2020 Candidate for President (2007–present)

State legislators

- Stacey Abrams, nominee for governor of Georgia in 2018 and former minority leader of the Georgia House of Representatives

Local officials

- Pete Buttigieg, former Mayor of South Bend (2012–2020), 2020 Candidate for President

Organizations

- Black Economic Alliance
- Center for Biological Diversity
- Council for a Livable World
- Everytown for Gun Safety
- Humane Society of the United States Legislative Fund
- J Street PAC
- Jewish Democratic Council of America
- Joint Action Committee for Political Affairs
- League of Conservation Voters
- NARAL
- Natural Resources Defense Council Action Fund
- Planned Parenthood Action Fund
- Sierra Club
- Climate Hawks Vote

Unions

- AFL–CIO
- National Education Association
- United Auto Workers

Individuals

- Amy Acker, actress
- Patrick J. Adams, actor
- Usman Ally, actor
- Ed Asner, actor
- Dan Bakkedahl, actor
- Troian Bellisario, actress
- Sufe Bradshaw, actress
- Don Cheadle, actor
- Anna Chlumsky, actress
- Stephen Colbert, actor and comedian
- Gary Cole, actor
- David Costabile, actor
- Bryan Cranston, actor
- Denise Crosby, actress
- Zooey Deschanel, actress
- Julia Louis-Dreyfuss, actress
- Kevin Dunn, actor
- Clea DuVall, actress
- Billie Eilish, singer
- Beanie Feldstein, actress
- Will Ferrell, actor
- Nelson Franklin, actor
- Tony Hale, actor
- Mark Hamill, actor
- Rachael Harris, actress
- Ed Helms, actor and comedian
- Rick Hoffman, actor
- Aaron Korsh, writer and producer
- Lisa Ling, journalist and author
- John Lithgow, actor
- Gabriel Macht, actor
- Rory O'Malley, actor
- David Mandel, writer and director
- Kumail Nanjiani, actor
- Bob Newhart, actor
- Matt Oberg, actor
- Patton Oswalt, actor and comedian
- Lennon Parham, actress
- David Pasquesi, actor
- Jordan Peele, actor, director and comedian
- Sarah Rafferty, actress
- Anthony Rapp, actor
- Sam Richardson, actor
- Andy Richter, actor and comedian
- Paul Scheer, actor
- Amanda Schull, actress
- Reid Scott, actor
- Amy Sedaris, actress
- Timothy Simons, actor
- Mary Steenburgen, actress
- Sarah Sutherland, actress
- Max Topplin, actor
- Gina Torres, actress
- Matt Walsh, actor
- Kerry Washington, actress
- D. B. Woodside, actor
- Bowen Yang, actor and comedian

=== Polling ===
==== Aggregate polls ====
Source of poll aggregation	Dates administered	Dates updated	David Perdue Republican	Jon Ossoff Democratic	Other/ Undecided (Note: Calculated by taking the difference of 100% and all other candidates combined.)	Margin
270 To Win	November 2, 2020	November 3, 2020	46.2%	47.4%	6.4%	Ossoff +1.2
Real Clear Politics	November 1, 2020	November 3, 2020	46.3%	47.0%	6.7%	Ossoff +0.7

Poll source	Date(s) administered	Sample size (Note: Key: A – all adults RV – registered voters LV – likely voters V – unclear)	Margin of error	David Perdue (R)	Jon Ossoff (D)	Shane Hazel (L)	Other / Undecided
Landmark Communications	November 1, 2020	500 (LV)	± 4.4%	49%	47%	3%	1% (Note: Undecided with 1%)
Swayable	October 27 – November 1, 2020	407 (LV)	± 6.4%	49%	48%	3%	–
Data for Progress	October 27 – November 1, 2020	1,036 (LV)	± 3%	46%	51%	3%	0% (Note: "Other candidate or write-in" with 0%)
Emerson College	October 29–31, 2020	749 (LV)	± 3.5%	49% (Note: With voters who lean towards a given candidate)	51%	–	3% (Note: "Someone else" with 3%)
Morning Consult	October 22–31, 2020	1,743 (LV)	± 2.0%	46%	47%	–	–
Landmark Communications	October 28, 2020	750 (LV)	± 3.6%	47%	47%	3%	3% (Note: Undecided with 3%)
Public Policy Polling	October 27–28, 2020	661 (V)	–	44%	47%	3%	6% (Note: Undecided with 6%)
Monmouth University	October 23–27, 2020	504 (RV)	± 4.4%	46%	49%	2%	2% (Note: "Other candidate" and "No one" with 0%; Undecided with 2%)
Monmouth University	October 23–27, 2020	504 (LV) (Note: With a likely voter turnout model featuring higher turnout than in the 2016 presidential election)	± 4.4%	47%	49%	–	–
Monmouth University	October 23–27, 2020	504 (LV) (Note: With a likely voter turnout model featuring lower turnout than in the 2016 presidential election)	± 4.4%	48%	49%	–	–
Swayable	October 23–26, 2020	342 (LV)	± 7.2%	49%	48%	3%	–
Civiqs/Daily Kos	October 23–26, 2020	1,041 (LV)	± 3.4%	46%	51%	2%	2% (Note: "Someone else" and Undecided with 1%)
YouGov/CBS	October 20–23, 2020	1,090 (LV)	± 3.4%	47%	46%	–	6% (Note: "Someone else" with 2%; Undecided with 4%)
University of Georgia	October 14–23, 2020	1,145 (LV)	± 4%	45%	46%	4%	5% (Note: Undecided with 5%)
Landmark Communications	October 21, 2020	500 (LV)	± 4.4%	50%	45%	–	–
Citizen Data	October 17–20, 2020	1,000 (LV)	± 3%	41%	47%	–	12% (Note: "Other" with 5%; Undecided with 8%)
Morning Consult	October 11–20, 2020	1,672 (LV)	± 2.4%	46%	44%	–	–
Emerson College	October 17–19, 2020	506 (LV)	± 4.3%	46%	45%	–	9% (Note: "Someone else" with 3%; Undecided with 6%)
Siena College/NYT Upshot	October 13–19, 2020	759 (LV)	± 4.1%	43%	43%	4%	10% (Note: "Someone else" and would not vote with 1%; "Undecided/Refused" with 8%)
Opinion Insight (R) (Note: The American Action Forum is a 501 organization which usually supports Republican candidates.)	October 12–15, 2020	801 (LV)	± 3.46%	45%	45%	–	8% (Note: "Someone else" and did/would not vote with 1%; "Undecided/Refused" with 6%)
Garin-Hart-Yang Research Group (D) (Note: Poll sponsored by Ossoff's campaign.)	October 11–14, 2020	600 (LV)	–	43%	48%	6%	3%
Quinnipiac University	October 8–12, 2020	1,040 (LV)	± 3.0%	45%	51%	–	3% (Note: "Someone else" with 0%; Undecided with 3%)
SurveyUSA	October 8–12, 2020	677 (LV)	± 5.7%	46%	43%	–	11% (Note: "Some other candidate" with 3%; Undecided with 8%)
Data for Progress	October 8–11, 2020	782 (LV)	± 3.5%	43%	44%	1%	10%
Morning Consult	October 2–11, 2020	1,837 (LV)	± 2.3%	46%	42%	–	–
Public Policy Polling	October 8–9, 2020	528 (V)	± 4.3%	43%	44%	4%	9% (Note: Undecided with 9%)
Landmark Communications	October 7, 2020	600 (LV)	± 4%	47%	46%	2%	6%
University of Georgia	September 27 – October 6, 2020	1,106 (LV)	± 2.9%	49%	41%	3%	7% (Note: Undecided with 7%)
Civiqs/Daily Kos	September 26–29, 2020	969 (LV)	± 3.5%	46%	48%	3%	3% (Note: "Someone else" with 1%; Undecided with 2%)
Hart Research Associates (D) (Note: Poll sponsored by The Human Rights Campaign, which endorsed Biden before this poll's sampling period.)	September 24–27, 2020	400 (LV)	± 4.9%	49%	46%	–	–
Quinnipiac University	September 23–27, 2020	1,125 (LV)	± 2.9%	48%	49%	–	2% (Note: "Someone else" with 0%; Undecided with 2%)
Redfield & Wilton Strategies	September 23–26, 2020	789 (LV)	± 3.49%	42%	47%	–	12% (Note: "Another Third Party/Write-in" with 3%; Undecided with 9%)
YouGov/CBS	September 22–25, 2020	1,164 (LV)	± 3.4%	47%	42%	–	10% (Note: "Someone else" with 2%; Undecided with 8%)
Monmouth University	September 17–21, 2020	402 (RV)	± 4.9%	48%	42%	4%	6% (Note: "Other" and "No one" with 0%; Undecided with 6%)
Monmouth University	September 17–21, 2020	402 (LV)	± 4.9%	48%	43%	3%	5%
Monmouth University	September 17–21, 2020	402 (LV)	± 4.9%	50%	42%	2%	4% (Note: Undecided with 4%)
Siena College/NYT Upshot	September 16–21, 2020	523 (LV)	± 4.9%	41%	38%	5%	16% (Note: "Someone else" and would not vote with 0%; "Undecided/Refused" with 16%)
University of Georgia	September 11–20, 2020	1,150 (LV)	± 4%	47%	45%	4%	5%
Morning Consult	September 11–20, 2020	1,406 (LV)	± (2% – 7%)	43% (Note: Overlapping sample with the previous Morning Consult poll, but more information available regarding sample size)	44%	–	–
Data For Progress (D)	September 14–19, 2020	800 (LV)	± 3.5%	43%	41%	2%	14% (Note: Undecided with 14%)
Morning Consult	September 8–17, 2020	1,402 (LV) (Note: Additional data sourced from FiveThirtyEight)	± (2% – 4%)	43%	43%	–	–
GBAO Strategies (D) (Note: Poll sponsored by Warnock's campaign for the 2020–21 United States Senate special election in Georgia.)	September 14–16, 2020	600 (LV)	–	48%	49%	–	–
Redfield & Wilton Strategies	September 12–16, 2020	800 (LV)	± 3.46%	43%	43%	–	14% (Note: "Another Third Party/Write-in" with 3%; Undecided with 11%)
Fabrizio Ward/Hart Research Associates (Note: Poll sponsored by AARP.)	August 30 – September 5, 2020	800 (LV)	± 3.5%	47%	48%	–	5% (Note: Would not vote with 1%; Undecided with 4%)
Opinion Insight/American Action Forum	August 30 – September 2, 2020	800 (LV)	± 3.46%	45%	44%	–	11% (Note: Would not vote with 2%; Undecided with 9%)
HarrisX (D) (Note: Poll sponsored by Matt Lieberman's campaign.)	August 20–30, 2020	1,616 (RV)	± 2.4%	47%	40%	8%	4% (Note: Would not vote with 4%)
Public Policy Polling	August 13–14, 2020	530 (V)	± 4.1%	44%	44%	–	11% (Note: Undecided with 11%)
Garin-Hart-Yang Research (D)	August 10–13, 2020	601 (LV)	± 4.0%	46%	48%	–	6%
SurveyUSA	August 6–8, 2020	623 (LV)	± 5.3%	44%	41%	–	14% (Note: "Some other candidate" with 4%; Undecided with 10%)
YouGov/CBS	July 28–31, 2020	1,101 (LV)	± 3.4%	45%	43%	–	13% (Note: "Someone else" with 3%; Undecided with 10%)
HIT Strategies (D) (Note: This poll's sponsor, DFER, primarily supports Democratic candidates.)	July 23–31, 2020	400 (RV)	± 4.9%	39%	42%	–	19% (Note: "Third party candidate" with 3%; would not vote with 2%; Undecided with 14%)
Monmouth University	July 23–27, 2020	402 (RV)	± 4.9%	49%	43%	1%	7%
Monmouth University	July 23–27, 2020	402 (LV)	± 4.9%	50%	43%	1%	6%
Monmouth University	July 23–27, 2020	402 (LV)	± 4.9%	51%	43%	1%	6%
Morning Consult	July 17–26, 2020	1,337 (LV)	± 3.0%	45%	42%	–	12%
Spry Strategies (R) (Note: This poll's sponsor is the American Principles Project, a 501 that supports the Republican Party.)	July 11–16, 2020	700 (LV)	± 3.7%	46%	44%	–	10% (Note: "Another candidate" with 4%; Undecided with 6%)
Garin-Hart-Yang Research (D)	July 9–15, 2020	800 (LV)	± 3.5%	44%	45%	–	11%
Gravis Marketing (R) (Note: Poll is sponsored by OANN, a far-right political talkshow.)	July 2, 2020	513 (LV)	± 4.3%	48%	43%	–	9%
Fox News	June 20–23, 2020	1,013 (RV)	± 3.0%	45%	42%	–	13% (Note: Undecided with 8%; "Other" with 3%; would not vote with 2%)
Public Policy Polling	June 12–13, 2020	661 (V)	± 3.4%	44%	45%	–	11%
Civiqs/Daily Kos	May 16–18, 2020	1,339 (RV)	± 3.1%	45%	47%	–	7% (Note: "Someone else" with 4%; Undecided with 3%)
The Progress Campaign (D)	May 6–15, 2020	2,893 (LV)	± 2.0%	42%	42%	–	16%
BK Strategies (R) (Note: This poll was sponsored by the Republican State Leadership Committee.)	May 11–13, 2020	700 (LV)	± 3.7%	46%	41%	–	13%
Public Opinion Strategies (R)	May 4–7, 2020	500 (LV)	± 4.4%	43%	41%	7%	8% (Note: "Undecided" with 8%)
Cygnal (R) (Note: Poll conducted for the Speaker of Georgia's House Republican caucus.)	April 25–27, 2020	591 (LV)	± 4.0%	45%	39%	–	16%
The Progress Campaign (D)	March 12–21, 2020	3,042 (RV)	± 4.5%	39%	40%	–	20%

Hypothetical polling

with Teresa Tomlinson

Poll source	Date(s) administered	Sample size	Margin of error	David Perdue (R)	Teresa Tomlinson (D)	Other / Undecided
Civiqs/Daily Kos	May 16–18	1,339 (RV)	±3.1%	45%	44%	10% (Note: "Someone else" with 6%; Undecided with 4%)
The Progress Campaign (D)	May 6–15	2,893 (LV)	± 2%	41%	40%	19%
The Progress Campaign (D)	March 12–21	3,042 (RV)	± 4.5%	40%	39%	21%

with Sarah Riggs Amico

Poll source	Date(s) administered	Sample size	Margin of error	David Perdue (R)	Sarah Riggs Amico (D)	Other / Undecided
Civiqs/Daily Kos	May 16–18	1,339 (RV)	±3.1%	45%	42%	13% (Note: "Someone else" with 8%; Undecided with 5%)

with Stacey Abrams

Poll source	Date(s) administered	Sample size	Margin of error	David Perdue (R)	Stacey Abrams (D)	Other / Undecided
The Progress Campaign (D)	March 12–21	3,042 (RV)	± 4.5%	41%	46%	12%

with Generic Democrat

Poll source	Date(s) administered	Sample size	Margin of error	David Perdue (R)	Generic Democrat	Other / Undecided
SurveyUSA	November 15–18, 2019	1,303 (LV)	± 3.2%	40%	37%	23%
University of Georgia	October 28–30, 2019	1,028 (RV)	–	35.1%	21.1%	43.8%

with Generic Republican and Generic Democrat

Poll source	Date(s) administered	Sample size	Margin of error	Generic Republican	Generic Democrat	Other / Undecided
Global Strategy Group (D) (Note: Poll sponsored by the Democratic Senatorial Campaign Committee.)	March 17–19, 2019	603 (LV)	± 4.0%	40%	42%	18%

=== Results ===
First round state senate district results

No candidate received a majority of the vote on November 3, so the top two finishers—incumbent Republican senator David Perdue (49.7%) and Democratic challenger Jon Ossoff (47.9%)—advanced to a runoff election held on January 5, 2021.

Voters whose mail-in ballots were rejected were allowed to submit corrections until 5pm on November 6.

2020 United States Senate election in Georgia
Party	Candidate	Votes	%	±%
Republican	David Perdue (incumbent)	2,462,617	49.73%	−3.16%
Democratic	Jon Ossoff	2,374,519	47.95%	+2.74%
Libertarian	Shane T. Hazel	115,039	2.32%	+0.42%
Total votes		4,952,175	100.0%	

==== By county ====
County	David Perdue Republican		Jon Ossoff Democratic		Various candidates Other parties		Margin		Total votes cast
County	#	%	#	%	#	%	#	%	Total votes cast
Appling	6,306	77.02%	1,753	21.41%	128	1.56%	4,553	55.61%	8,187
Atkinson	2,272	73.36%	773	24.96%	52	1.68%	1,499	48.40%	3,097
Bacon	3,929	85.60%	591	12.88%	70	1.53%	3,338	72.72%	4,590
Baker	873	59.11%	591	40.01%	13	0.88%	282	19.10%	1,477
Baldwin	8,873	49.07%	8,783	48.57%	426	2.36%	90	0.50%	18,082
Banks	7,636	87.52%	899	10.30%	190	2.18%	6,737	77.22%	8,725
Barrow	26,317	69.94%	10,066	26.75%	1,244	3.31%	16,251	43.19%	37,627
Bartow	37,009	73.90%	11,664	23.29%	1,407	2.81%	25,345	50.61%	50,080
Ben Hill	4,077	62.95%	2,284	35.26%	116	1.79%	1,793	27.69%	6,477
Berrien	6,286	82.17%	1,204	15.74%	160	2.09%	5,082	66.43%	7,650
Bibb	26,645	38.07%	41,928	59.91%	1,414	2.02%	-15,283	-21.84%	69,987
Bleckley	4,281	75.85%	1,249	22.13%	114	2.02%	3,032	53.72%	5,644
Brantley	6,812	89.44%	688	9.03%	116	1.52%	6,124	80.41%	7,616
Brooks	4,250	60.92%	2,607	37.37%	119	1.71%	1,643	23.55%	6,976
Bryan	14,067	66.47%	6,497	30.70%	599	2.83%	7,570	35.77%	21,163
Bulloch	18,232	61.20%	10,846	36.40%	715	2.40%	7,386	24.80%	29,793
Burke	5,407	51.20%	4,989	47.24%	164	1.55%	418	3.96%	10,560
Butts	8,329	71.25%	3,129	26.77%	232	1.98%	5,200	44.48%	11,690
Calhoun	933	42.96%	1,211	55.76%	28	1.29%	-278	-12.80%	2,172
Camden	14,987	64.19%	7,467	31.98%	895	3.83%	7,520	32.21%	23,349
Candler	3,077	70.41%	1,233	28.22%	60	1.37%	1,844	42.19%	4,370
Carroll	36,997	68.55%	15,549	28.81%	1,427	2.64%	21,448	39.74%	53,973
Catoosa	24,571	76.28%	6,599	20.49%	1,042	3.23%	17,972	55.79%	32,212
Charlton	3,357	74.98%	1,016	22.69%	104	2.32%	2,341	52.29%	4,477
Chatham	52,988	40.19%	75,873	57.55%	2,986	2.26%	-22,885	-17.36%	131,847
Chattahoochee	850	54.91%	636	41.09%	62	4.01%	214	13.82%	1,548
Chattooga	7,777	78.26%	1,886	18.98%	275	2.77%	5,891	59.28%	9,938
Cherokee	99,384	69.24%	39,928	27.82%	4,214	2.94%	59,456	41.42%	143,526
Clarke	15,078	29.59%	34,549	67.81%	1,323	2.60%	-19,471	-38.22%	50,950
Clay	647	45.69%	748	52.82%	21	1.48%	-101	-7.13%	1,416
Clayton	14,841	13.36%	93,699	84.38%	2,505	2.26%	-78,858	-71.02%	111,045
Clinch	2,083	74.47%	660	23.60%	54	1.93%	1,423	50.87%	2,797
Cobb	169,658	43.42%	210,851	53.96%	10,263	2.63%	-41,193	-10.54%	390,772
Coffee	10,424	69.54%	4,281	28.56%	286	1.91%	6,143	40.98%	14,991
Colquitt	11,644	73.27%	3,990	25.11%	257	1.62%	7,654	48.16%	15,891
Columbia	50,220	62.85%	27,759	34.74%	1,928	2.41%	22,461	28.11%	79,907
Cook	4,864	69.76%	1,963	28.16%	145	2.08%	2,901	41.60%	6,972
Coweta	51,299	67.39%	22,915	30.10%	1,908	2.51%	28,384	37.29%	76,122
Crawford	4,330	71.86%	1,561	25.90%	135	2.24%	2,769	45.96%	6,026
Crisp	5,054	63.33%	2,809	35.20%	117	1.47%	2,245	28.13%	7,980
Dade	5,871	80.07%	1,253	17.09%	208	2.84%	4,618	62.98%	7,332
Dawson	13,217	83.00%	2,289	14.37%	418	2.62%	10,928	68.63%	15,924
Decatur	6,696	58.49%	4,563	39.86%	190	1.66%	2,133	18.63%	11,449
DeKalb	61,859	16.83%	298,479	81.19%	7,305	1.99%	-236,620	-64.36%	367,643
Dodge	5,793	72.85%	2,021	25.41%	138	1.74%	3,772	47.44%	7,952
Dooly	2,158	53.17%	1,826	44.99%	75	1.85%	332	8.18%	4,059
Dougherty	10,588	30.33%	23,821	68.23%	502	1.44%	-13,233	-37.90%	34,911
Douglas	25,002	36.53%	41,796	61.07%	1,643	2.40%	-16,794	-24.54%	68,441
Early	2,796	54.77%	2,232	43.72%	77	1.51%	564	11.05%	5,105
Echols	1,232	86.88%	162	11.42%	24	1.69%	1,070	75.46%	1,418
Effingham	22,832	72.90%	7,627	24.35%	860	2.75%	15,205	48.55%	31,319
Elbert	6,225	68.60%	2,717	29.94%	133	1.47%	3,508	38.66%	9,075
Emanuel	6,513	69.52%	2,720	29.04%	135	1.44%	3,793	40.48%	9,368
Evans	2,876	68.62%	1,251	29.85%	64	1.53%	1,625	38.77%	4,191
Fannin	11,972	81.52%	2,415	16.44%	299	2.04%	9,557	65.08%	14,686
Fayette	38,403	53.73%	31,477	44.04%	1,590	2.22%	6,926	9.69%	71,470
Floyd	28,752	69.64%	11,480	27.80%	1,056	2.56%	17,272	41.84%	41,288
Forsyth	85,652	66.78%	39,229	30.58%	3,386	2.64%	46,423	36.20%	128,267
Franklin	8,993	84.48%	1,465	13.76%	187	1.76%	7,528	70.72%	10,645
Fulton	146,466	28.12%	363,269	69.76%	11,043	2.12%	-216,803	-41.64%	520,778
Gilmer	13,206	80.98%	2,715	16.65%	386	2.37%	10,491	64.33%	16,307
Glascock	1,366	88.13%	150	9.68%	34	2.19%	1,216	78.45%	1,550
Glynn	25,560	61.64%	14,938	36.02%	970	2.34%	10,622	25.62%	41,468
Gordon	19,011	79.99%	4,182	17.60%	573	2.41%	14,829	62.39%	23,766
Grady	6,969	65.87%	3,465	32.75%	146	1.38%	3,504	33.12%	10,580
Greene	7,247	64.93%	3,763	33.71%	152	1.36%	3,484	31.22%	11,162
Gwinnett	166,754	41.69%	222,346	55.59%	10,901	2.73%	-55,592	-13.90%	400,001
Habersham	16,385	80.88%	3,340	16.49%	534	2.64%	13,045	64.39%	20,259
Hall	63,833	71.09%	23,487	26.16%	2,467	2.75%	40,346	44.93%	89,787
Hancock	1,173	28.63%	2,858	69.76%	66	1.61%	-1,685	-41.13%	4,097
Haralson	12,016	85.12%	1,764	12.50%	336	2.38%	10,252	72.62%	14,116
Harris	14,279	71.85%	5,192	26.13%	402	2.02%	9,087	45.72%	19,873
Hart	9,377	74.82%	2,937	23.44%	218	1.74%	6,440	51.38%	12,532
Heard	4,413	82.83%	802	15.05%	113	2.12%	3,611	67.78%	5,328
Henry	47,486	39.02%	71,592	58.82%	2,631	2.16%	-24,106	-19.80%	121,709
Houston	41,428	55.86%	30,955	41.74%	1,779	2.40%	10,473	14.12%	74,162
Irwin	3,095	74.63%	982	23.68%	70	1.69%	2,113	50.95%	4,147
Jackson	29,166	78.02%	7,262	19.43%	955	2.55%	21,904	58.59%	37,383
Jasper	5,751	75.75%	1,690	22.26%	151	1.99%	4,061	53.49%	7,592
Jeff Davis	4,574	80.27%	1,013	17.78%	111	1.95%	3,561	62.49%	5,698
Jefferson	3,539	46.85%	3,913	51.80%	102	1.35%	-374	-4.95%	7,554
Jenkins	2,155	63.38%	1,194	35.12%	51	1.50%	961	28.26%	3,400
Johnson	2,801	69.43%	1,158	28.71%	75	1.86%	1,643	40.72%	4,034
Jones	9,854	66.39%	4,687	31.58%	301	2.03%	5,167	34.81%	14,842
Lamar	6,280	69.87%	2,511	27.94%	197	2.19%	3,769	41.93%	8,988
Lanier	2,481	70.50%	944	26.83%	94	2.67%	1,537	43.67%	3,519
Laurens	14,363	63.91%	7,698	34.25%	413	1.84%	6,665	29.66%	22,474
Lee	11,862	71.63%	4,424	26.72%	273	1.65%	7,438	44.91%	16,559
Liberty	7,743	36.71%	12,738	60.40%	610	2.89%	-4,995	-23.69%	21,091
Lincoln	3,139	68.34%	1,371	29.85%	83	1.81%	1,768	38.49%	4,593
Long	3,389	60.72%	2,029	36.36%	163	2.92%	1,360	24.36%	5,581
Lowndes	25,620	55.97%	19,124	41.78%	1,028	2.25%	6,496	14.19%	45,772
Lumpkin	11,941	77.73%	2,926	19.05%	496	3.23%	9,015	58.68%	15,363
Macon	1,787	38.91%	2,727	59.37%	79	1.72%	-940	-20.46%	4,593
Madison	11,136	75.25%	3,303	22.32%	359	2.43%	7,833	52.93%	14,798
Marion	2,248	62.46%	1,267	35.20%	84	2.33%	981	27.26%	3,599
McDuffie	6,198	59.77%	3,968	38.26%	204	1.97%	2,230	21.51%	10,370
McIntosh	3,967	60.06%	2,498	37.82%	140	2.12%	1,469	22.24%	6,605
Meriwether	6,432	59.68%	4,135	38.37%	211	1.96%	2,297	21.31%	10,778
Miller	2,047	73.61%	687	24.70%	47	1.69%	1,360	48.91%	2,781
Mitchell	4,921	55.47%	3,832	43.20%	118	1.33%	1,089	12.27%	8,871
Monroe	10,929	70.84%	4,205	27.26%	294	1.91%	6,724	43.58%	15,428
Montgomery	2,927	74.67%	931	23.75%	62	1.58%	1,996	50.92%	3,920
Morgan	8,259	71.03%	3,151	27.10%	217	1.87%	5,108	43.93%	11,627
Murray	12,493	83.16%	2,296	15.28%	234	1.56%	10,197	67.88%	15,023
Muscogee	30,226	38.00%	47,552	59.78%	1,772	2.23%	-17,326	-21.78%	79,550
Newton	23,408	43.53%	29,220	54.33%	1,150	2.14%	-5,812	-10.80%	53,778
Oconee	17,108	68.05%	7,465	29.69%	569	2.26%	9,643	38.36%	25,142
Oglethorpe	5,500	68.26%	2,323	28.83%	234	2.90%	3,177	39.43%	8,057
Paulding	53,485	63.26%	28,755	34.01%	2,308	2.73%	24,730	29.25%	84,548
Peach	6,483	52.15%	5,702	45.87%	247	1.99%	781	6.28%	12,432
Pickens	13,860	81.68%	2,678	15.78%	431	2.54%	11,182	65.90%	16,969
Pierce	7,810	87.35%	1,002	11.21%	129	1.44%	6,808	76.14%	8,941
Pike	9,045	84.94%	1,430	13.43%	174	1.63%	7,615	71.51%	10,649
Polk	13,282	77.06%	3,537	20.52%	416	2.41%	9,745	56.54%	17,235
Pulaski	2,787	69.59%	1,139	28.44%	79	1.97%	1,648	41.15%	4,005
Putnam	8,279	70.36%	3,299	28.04%	189	1.61%	4,980	42.32%	11,767
Quitman	600	55.30%	470	43.32%	15	1.38%	130	11.98%	1,085
Rabun	7,392	78.04%	1,825	19.27%	255	2.69%	5,567	58.77%	9,472
Randolph	1,404	46.17%	1,606	52.81%	31	1.02%	-202	-6.64%	3,041
Richmond	27,052	31.47%	56,786	66.05%	2,130	2.48%	-29,734	-34.58%	85,968
Rockdale	12,716	28.73%	30,641	69.22%	906	2.05%	−17,925	-40.49%	44,263
Schley	1,783	79.03%	439	19.46%	34	1.51%	1,344	59.57%	2,256
Screven	3,893	59.46%	2,589	39.54%	65	0.99%	1,304	19.92%	6,547
Seminole	2,597	67.67%	1,187	30.93%	54	1.41%	1,410	36.74%	3,838
Spalding	17,768	59.70%	11,355	38.15%	641	2.15%	6,413	21.55%	29,764
Stephens	9,353	79.48%	2,187	18.58%	228	1.94%	7,166	60.90%	11,768
Stewart	803	41.12%	1,115	57.09%	35	1.79%	−312	-15.97%	1,953
Sumter	5,743	47.77%	6,114	50.86%	165	1.37%	−371	-3.09%	12,022
Talbot	1,386	40.17%	2,013	58.35%	51	1.48%	−627	-18.18%	3,450
Taliaferro	366	40.58%	521	57.76%	15	1.66%	−155	-17.18%	902
Tattnall	5,954	73.59%	1,978	24.45%	159	1.97%	3,976	49.141%	8,091
Taylor	2,399	63.26%	1,312	34.60%	81	2.14%	1,087	28.66%	3,792
Telfair	2,751	64.65%	1,435	33.73%	69	1.62%	1,316	30.92%	4,255
Terrell	2,040	46.63%	2,277	52.05%	58	1.33%	−237	-5.42%	4,375
Thomas	13,020	60.28%	8,158	37.77%	422	1.95%	4,862	22.51%	21,600
Tift	10,814	67.27%	4,956	30.83%	305	1.90%	5,858	36.44%	16,075
Toombs	7,793	72.17%	2,832	26.23%	173	1.60%	4,961	45.94%	10,798
Towns	6,291	79.75%	1,451	18.40%	146	1.85%	4,840	61.35%	7,888
Treutlen	2,078	68.74%	893	29.54%	52	1.72%	1,185	39.20%	3,023
Troup	18,162	60.93%	11,111	37.27%	536	1.80%	7,051	23.66%	29,809
Turner	2,334	62.39%	1,345	35.95%	62	1.66%	989	26.44%	3,741
Twiggs	2,313	52.80%	1,981	45.22%	87	1.99%	332	7.58%	4,381
Union	12,423	80.72%	2,616	17.00%	351	2.28%	9,807	63.72%	15,390
Upson	8,568	66.32%	4,000	30.96%	351	2.72%	4,568	35.36%	12,919
Walker	22,650	78.05%	5,435	18.73%	934	3.22%	17,215	59.32%	29,019
Walton	37,399	73.71%	12,146	23.94%	1,193	2.35%	25,253	49.77%	50,738
Ware	9,773	69.91%	3,937	28.16%	269	1.92%	5,836	41.75%	13,979
Warren	1,161	44.41%	1,407	53.83%	46	1.76%	-246	-9.42%	2,614
Washington	4,630	49.90%	4,477	48.25%	172	1.85%	153	1.65%	9,279
Wayne	9,734	77.05%	2,655	21.02%	244	1.93%	7,079	56.03%	12,633
Webster	736	53.64%	626	45.63%	10	0.73%	110	8.01%	1,372
Wheeler	1,562	69.30%	657	29.15%	35	1.55%	905	40.15%	2,254
White	12,072	82.03%	2,273	15.45%	371	2.52%	9,799	66.58%	14,716
Whitfield	25,158	69.31%	10,177	28.04%	962	2.65%	14,981	41.27%	36,297
Wilcox	2,369	73.34%	805	24.92%	56	1.73%	1,564	48.42%	3,230
Wilkes	2,810	56.83%	2,057	41.60%	78	1.58%	753	15.23%	4,945
Wilkinson	2,608	55.44%	2,017	42.88%	79	1.68%	591	12.56%	4,704
Worth	6,726	73.03%	2,327	25.27%	157	1.70%	4,399	47.76%	9,210
Totals	2,462,617	49.73%	2,374,519	47.95%	115,039	2.32%	88,098	1.78%	4,952,175

==== By congressional district ====
Perdue won eight of 14 congressional districts in the general election.

District	Perdue	Ossoff	Elected Representative
1st	56%	42%	Buddy Carter
2nd	44%	54%	Sanford Bishop
3rd	62%	36%	Drew Ferguson
4th	20%	78%	Hank Johnson
5th	14%	84%	Nikema Williams
6th	46%	51%	Lucy McBath
7th	47%	51%	Carolyn Bourdeaux
8th	62%	36%	Austin Scott
9th	76%	21%	Andrew Clyde
10th	60%	38%	Jody Hice
11th	58%	39%	Barry Loudermilk
12th	56%	42%	Rick W. Allen
13th	23%	75%	David Scott
14th	73%	25%	Marjorie Taylor Greene

== Runoff ==
The runoff election between Perdue and Ossoff was on January 5, 2021, alongside the special election for the other Senate seat held by Republican Kelly Loeffler, to fill the remainder of Johnny Isakson's unexpired term (which expired in 2023). Loeffler was defeated by Raphael Warnock in that special election.

Following the 2020 Senate elections, Republicans held 50 Senate seats and the Democratic caucus 48. Since Democrats won both Georgia runoffs, their caucus gained control of the Senate, as the resultant 50–50 tie is broken by Democratic vice president Kamala Harris. If the Democrats had lost either race, Republicans would have retained control of the Senate. The high political stakes caused the races to attract significant nationwide attention. These elections are the third and fourth Senate runoff elections to be held in Georgia since runoffs were first mandated in 1964, following runoffs in 1992 and 2008. It is also the third time that both of Georgia's Senate seats have been up for election at the same time, following double-barrel elections in 1914 and 1932.

The deadline for registration for the runoff election was December 7, 2020. Absentee ballots for the runoff election were sent out beginning on November 18, and in-person voting began on December 14. Ossoff's runoff campaign largely focused around accusing Perdue of corruption as well as aggressively courting Black voters in an attempt to drive up turnout, while Perdue characterised Ossoff as a socialist and accused him of having ties to the People's Republic of China. Perdue's campaign was hampered by his refusal to state that Joe Biden had won that year's presidential election, which made it exceedingly difficult for him to argue that an Ossoff victory would create a Democratic trifecta.

As Ossoff and Warnock were both sworn in on January 20, 2021 shortly after the start of the Biden administration, Ossoff became Georgia's senior senator and Democrats simultaneously held both of Georgia’s U.S. Senate seats for the first time since 2003.

=== Predictions ===
Source	Ranking	As of
The Cook Political Report	Tossup	January 4, 2021
Inside Elections	Tossup	December 14, 2020
Sabato's Crystal Ball	Tossup	January 5, 2021

=== Fundraising ===
Campaign finance reports as of December 31, 2020
Candidate	Raised	Spent	Cash on hand
Jon Ossoff (D)	$156,146,537	$151,814,804	$4,331,733
David Perdue (R)	$102,722,245	$90,354,529	$12,414,00
Source: Federal Election Commission

=== Polling ===
==== Aggregate polls ====
Source of poll aggregation	Dates administered	Dates updated	David Perdue Republican	Jon Ossoff Democratic	Undecided	Margin
270 To Win	Dec 30, 2020 – January 4, 2021	January 4, 2021	47.4%	50.2%	2.4%	Ossoff +2.8
RealClearPolitics	Dec 14, 2020 – January 4, 2021	January 5, 2021	48.8%	49.3%	1.9%	Ossoff +0.5
538	Nov 9, 2020 – January 4, 2021	January 5, 2021	47.4%	49.1%	3.5%	Ossoff +1.8
Average			47.9%	49.5%	2.6%	Ossoff +1.7

This section also contains pre-runoff polls excluding all candidates except head-to-head matchups.

Poll source	Date(s) administered	Sample size	Margin of error	David Perdue (R)	Jon Ossoff (D)	Undecided
Trafalgar Group (R)	January 2–4, 2021	1,056 (LV)	± 2.9%	49%	49%	2%
AtlasIntel	January 2–4, 2021	857 (LV)	± 3%	47%	51%	2%
InsiderAdvantage	January 3, 2021	500 (LV)	± 4.4%	49%	49%	3%
National Research Inc	January 2–3, 2021	500 (LV)	± 4.4%	45%	46%	9%
University of Nevada Las Vegas Lee Business School	December 30, 2020 – January 3, 2021	550 (LV)	± 4%	49%	48%	3%
Targoz Market Research	December 30, 2020 – January 3, 2021	713 (LV)	± 3.7%	50%	50%	0%
Targoz Market Research	December 30, 2020 – January 3, 2021	1,342 (RV)	± 3.7%	47%	51%	2%
AtlasIntel	December 25, 2020 – January 1, 2021	1,680 (LV)	± 2%	47%	51%	2%
Gravis Marketing	December 29–30, 2020	1,011 (LV)	± 3.1%	47%	50%	3%
JMC Analytics and Polling	December 28–29, 2020	500 (LV)	± 4.4%	45%	53%	2%
Trafalgar Group (R)	December 23–27, 2020	1,022 (LV)	± 3.0%	48%	50%	2%
Open Model Project	December 21–27, 2020	1,405 (LV)	± 4.7%	50%	46%	4%
InsiderAdvantage	December 21–22, 2020	500 (LV)	± 4.4%	49%	48%	3%
Mellman Group	December 18–22, 2020	578 (LV)	± 4.1%	47%	50%	3%
Reconnect Research/Probolsky Research	December 14–22, 2020	1,027 (LV)	± 4%	43%	42%	15%
SurveyUSA	December 16–20, 2020	600 (LV)	± 5.1%	46%	51%	3%
Trafalgar Group (R)	December 14–16, 2020	1,064 (LV)	± 3.0%	50%	48%	2%
Emerson College	December 14–16, 2020	605 (LV)	± 3.9%	51%	48%	1%
InsiderAdvantage	December 14, 2020	500 (LV)	± 4.4%	49%	48%	3%
Wick	December 10–14, 2020	1,500 (LV)	–	51%	47%	2%
RMG Research	December 8–14, 2020	1,417 (LV)	± 2.6%	47%	49%	4%
Baris/Peach State Battleground Poll	December 4–11, 2020	1,008 (LV)	± 3.1%	45%	47%	9%
Trafalgar Group (R)	December 8–10, 2020	1,018 (LV)	± 3.0%	49%	49%	2%
Fabrizio Ward/Hart Research Associates	November 30 – December 4, 2020	1,250 (LV)	± 3.2%	46%	48%	6%
Trafalgar Group (R)	December 1–3, 2020	1,083 (LV)	± 2.9%	47%	48%	5%
SurveyUSA	November 27–30, 2020	583 (LV)	± 5.2%	48%	50%	2%
RMG Research	November 19–24, 2020	1,377 (LV)	± 2.6%	47%	48%	5%
Data For Progress (D)	November 15–20, 2020	1,476 (LV)	± 2.6%	50%	48%	3%
InsiderAdvantage	November 16, 2020	800 (LV)	± 3.5%	49%	49%	2%
Remington Research Group	November 8–9, 2020	1,450 (LV)	± 2.6%	50%	46%	4%
Garin-Hart-Yang Research Group (D)	October 11–14, 2020	600 (LV)	–	45%	50%	5%
Data For Progress (D)	September 14–19, 2020	800 (LV)	± 3.5%	44%	44%	12%

Hypothetical polling

with Generic Republican and Generic Democrat

Poll source	Date(s) administered	Sample size	Margin of error	Generic Republican	Generic Democrat	Undecided
RMG Research/PoliticalIQ	December 8–14, 2020	1,377 (LV)	± 2.6%	46% (Note: "It is more important for Republicans to have control of the Senate" as opposed to "It is more important for Democrats to have control of the Senate" with 46%)	42%	11% (Note: "It does not matter which party has control of the Senate" with 7%; Undecided with 4%)
Quinnipiac University	September 23–27, 2020	1,125 (LV)	± 2.9%	48%	49%	3%

=== Results ===
Ossoff won Washington and Baldwin counties in the runoff, after having lost them in the general election.

2021 United States Senate election in Georgia runoff
Party	Candidate	Votes	%	±%
Democratic	Jon Ossoff	2,269,923	50.61%	N/A
Republican	David Perdue	2,214,979	49.39%	N/A
Total votes		4,484,902	100.00%	N/A
Democratic gain from Republican				

==== By county ====
By county

County	Jon Ossoff Democratic		David Perdue Republican		Margin		Total votes
County	#	%	#	%	#	%	Total votes
Appling	1,598	21.95	5,683	78.05	-4,085	-56.10	7,281
Atkinson	720	27.22	1,925	72.78	-1,205	-45.56	2,645
Bacon	559	13.54	3,569	86.46	-3,010	-72.92	4,128
Baker	630	43.78	809	56.22	-179	-12.44	1,439
Baldwin	8,515	51.78	7,931	48.22	584	3.55	16,446
Banks	836	11.22	6,612	88.78	-5,776	-77.55	7,448
Barrow	9,276	28.93	22,789	71.07	-13,513	-42.14	32,065
Bartow	10,735	24.98	32,239	75.02	-21,504	-50.04	42,974
Ben Hill	2,182	38.19	3,531	61.81	-1,349	-23.61	5,713
Berrien	1,141	17.08	5,538	82.92	-4,397	-65.83	6,679
Bibb	39,717	62.58	23,748	37.42	15,969	25.16	63,465
Bleckley	1,190	23.29	3,920	76.71	-2,730	-53.42	5,110
Brantley	615	9.29	6,003	90.71	-5,388	-81.41	6,618
Brooks	2,456	39.51	3,760	60.49	-1,304	-20.98	6,216
Bryan	6,020	32.34	12,596	67.66	-6,576	-35.32	18,616
Bulloch	9,832	37.61	16,311	62.39	-6,479	-24.78	26,143
Burke	4,686	49.37	4,806	50.63	-120	-1.26	9,492
Butts	3,004	29.43	7,205	70.57	-4,201	-41.15	10,209
Calhoun	1,202	59.21	828	40.79	374	18.42	2,030
Camden	6,856	34.50	13,015	65.50	-6,159	-30.99	19,871
Candler	1,134	28.97	2,781	71.03	-1,647	-42.07	3,915
Carroll	14,590	30.94	32,573	69.06	-17,983	-38.13	47,163
Catoosa	6,009	21.64	21,757	78.36	-15,748	-56.72	27,766
Charlton	966	24.70	2,945	75.30	-1,979	-50.60	3,911
Chatham	72,309	59.64	48,937	40.36	23,372	19.28	121,246
Chattahoochee	606	45.84	716	54.16	-110	-8.32	1,322
Chattooga	1,673	20.33	6,558	79.67	-4,885	-59.35	8,231
Cherokee	37,596	29.40	90,276	70.60	-52,680	-41.20	127,872
Clarke	32,901	71.20	13,311	28.80	19,590	42.39	46,212
Clay	728	55.53	583	44.47	145	11.06	1,311
Clayton	91,015	88.43	11,907	11.57	79,108	76.86	102,922
Clinch	615	25.06	1,839	74.94	-1,224	-49.88	2,454
Cobb	201,009	56.04	157,653	43.96	43,356	12.09	358,662
Coffee	4,058	30.71	9,154	69.29	-5,096	-38.57	13,212
Colquitt	3,714	26.43	10,339	73.57	-6,625	-47.14	14,053
Columbia	26,497	36.72	45,667	63.28	-19,170	-26.56	72,164
Cook	1,894	30.51	4,313	69.49	-2,419	-38.97	6,207
Coweta	21,527	31.99	45,776	68.01	-24,249	-36.03	67,303
Crawford	1,486	27.70	3,879	72.30	-2,393	-44.60	5,365
Crisp	2,681	37.58	4,454	62.42	-1,773	-24.85	7,135
Dade	1,131	17.79	5,227	82.21	-4,096	-64.42	6,358
Dawson	2,230	15.50	12,159	84.50	-9,929	-69.0	14,389
Decatur	4,127	41.08	5,919	58.92	-1,792	-17.84	10,046
DeKalb	291,667	83.49	57,674	16.51	233,993	66.98	349,341
Dodge	2,011	28.02	5,165	71.98	-3,154	-43.95	7,176
Dooly	1,802	48.18	1,938	51.82	-136	-3.64	3,740
Dougherty	22,745	70.88	9,346	29.12	13,399	41.75	32,091
Douglas	40,398	64.77	21,970	35.23	18,428	29.55	62,368
Early	2,182	47.96	2,368	52.04	-186	-4.09	4,550
Echols	130	10.95	1,057	89.05	-927	-78.10	1,187
Effingham	7,147	25.68	20,680	74.32	-13,533	-48.63	27,827
Elbert	2,493	31.11	5,521	68.89	-3,028	-37.78	8,014
Emanuel	2,547	30.49	5,807	69.51	-3,260	-39.02	8,354
Evans	1,198	32.06	2,539	67.94	-1,341	-35.88	3,737
Fannin	2,378	17.68	11,070	82.32	-8,692	-64.63	13,448
Fayette	30,938	45.90	36,463	54.10	-5,525	-8.20	67,401
Floyd	10,676	29.83	25,108	70.17	-14,432	-40.33	35,784
Forsyth	36,936	32.06	78,263	67.94	-41,327	-35.87	115,199
Franklin	1,345	14.63	7,849	85.37	-6,504	-70.74	9,194
Fulton	350,342	71.68	138,417	28.32	211,925	43.36	488,759
Gilmer	2,664	17.97	12,163	82.03	-9,499	-64.07	14,827
Glascock	134	9.82	1,230	90.18	-1,096	-80.35	1,364
Glynn	13,976	37.32	23,476	62.68	-9,500	-25.37	37,452
Gordon	3,881	19.07	16,471	80.93	-12,590	-61.86	20,352
Grady	3,099	33.22	6,229	66.78	-3,130	-33.55	9,328
Greene	3,703	34.87	6,917	65.13	-3,214	-30.26	10,620
Gwinnett	222,346	60.11	147,563	39.89	74,783	20.22	369,909
Habersham	3,160	17.53	14,871	82.47	-11,711	-64.95	18,031
Hall	21,883	27.69	57,157	72.31	-35,274	-44.63	79,040
Hancock	2,775	72.34	1,061	27.66	1,714	44.68	3,836
Haralson	1,610	13.24	10,553	86.76	-8,943	-73.53	12,163
Harris	4,986	27.27	13,297	72.73	-8,311	-45.46	18,283
Hart	2,869	25.60	8,336	74.40	-5,467	-48.79	11,205
Heard	780	16.68	3,895	83.32	-3,115	-66.63	4,675
Henry	68,235	62.38	41,145	37.62	27,090	24.77	109,380
Houston	29,608	44.60	36,779	55.40	-7,171	-10.80	66,387
Irwin	877	24.25	2,739	75.75	-1,862	-51.49	3,616
Jackson	6,785	20.83	25,793	79.17	-19,008	-58.35	32,578
Jasper	1,654	24.32	5,146	75.68	-3,492	-51.35	6,800
Jeff Davis	947	18.62	4,139	81.38	-3,192	-62.76	5,086
Jefferson	3,752	54.17	3,174	45.83	578	8.35	6,926
Jenkins	1,173	37.64	1,943	62.36	-770	-24.71	3,116
Johnson	1,044	29.22	2,529	70.78	-1,485	-41.56	3,573
Jones	4,517	33.88	8,815	66.12	-4,298	-32.24	13,332
Lamar	2,395	30.0	5,588	70.0	-3,193	-40.0	7,983
Lanier	905	29.85	2,127	70.15	-1,222	-40.30	3,032
Laurens	7,389	36.50	12,855	63.50	-5,466	-27.0	20,244
Lee	4,225	28.37	10,665	71.63	-6,440	-43.25	14,890
Liberty	11,830	64.59	6,485	35.41	5,345	29.18	18,315
Lincoln	1,311	31.09	2,906	68.91	-1,595	-37.82	4,217
Long	1,795	38.74	2,838	61.26	-1,043	-22.51	4,633
Lowndes	17,369	43.60	22,464	56.40	-5,095	-12.79	39,833
Lumpkin	2,820	20.59	10,877	79.41	-8,057	-58.82	13,697
Macon	2,664	62.49	1,599	37.51	1,065	24.98	4,263
Madison	3,074	23.29	10,125	76.71	-7,051	-53.42	13,199
Marion	1,217	37.85	1,998	62.15	-781	-24.29	3,215
McDuffie	3,733	40.42	5,502	59.58	-1,769	-19.16	9,235
McIntosh	2,399	40.40	3,539	59.60	-1,140	-19.20	5,938
Meriwether	4,012	40.75	5,833	59.25	-1,821	-18.50	9,845
Miller	650	26.53	1,800	73.47	-1,150	-46.94	2,450
Mitchell	3,546	45.14	4,309	54.86	-763	-9.71	7,855
Monroe	4,027	28.54	10,084	71.46	-6,057	-42.92	14,111
Montgomery	884	25.12	2,635	74.88	-1,751	-49.76	3,519
Morgan	3,097	28.60	7,730	71.40	-4,633	-42.79	10,827
Murray	2,036	15.66	10,963	84.34	-8,927	-68.67	12,999
Muscogee	44,875	62.76	26,626	37.24	18,249	25.52	71,501
Newton	28,177	57.74	20,620	42.26	7,557	15.49	48,797
Oconee	7,322	31.10	16,220	68.90	-8,898	-37.80	23,542
Oglethorpe	2,237	30.97	4,985	69.03	-2,748	-38.05	7,222
Paulding	27,083	36.62	46,872	63.38	-19,789	-26.76	73,955
Peach	5,335	48.27	5,717	51.73	-382	-3.46	11,052
Pickens	2,548	16.82	12,601	83.18	-10,053	-66.36	15,149
Pierce	956	12.06	6,972	87.94	-6,016	-75.88	7,928
Pike	1,372	14.24	8,266	85.76	-6,894	-71.53	9,638
Polk	3,305	22.25	11,546	77.75	-8,241	-55.49	14,851
Pulaski	1,118	30.36	2,564	69.64	-1,446	-39.27	3,682
Putnam	3,160	29.16	7,676	70.84	-4,516	-41.68	10,836
Quitman	463	45.80	548	54.20	-85	-8.41	1,011
Rabun	1,789	21.28	6,618	78.72	-4,829	-57.44	8,407
Randolph	1,672	56.45	1,290	43.55	382	12.90	2,962
Richmond	53,568	69.36	23,660	30.64	29,908	38.73	77,228
Rockdale	29,463	72.38	11,244	27.62	18,219	44.76	40,707
Schley	435	21.14	1,623	78.86	-1,188	-57.73	2,058
Screven	2,408	40.70	3,509	59.30	-1,101	-18.61	5,917
Seminole	1,147	32.79	2,351	67.21	-1,204	-34.42	3,498
Spalding	10,966	40.73	15,957	59.27	-4,991	-18.54	26,923
Stephens	2,058	20.50	7,979	79.50	-5,921	-58.99	10,037
Stewart	1,115	61.88	687	38.12	428	23.75	1,802
Sumter	5,847	52.79	5,230	47.21	617	5.57	11,077
Talbot	1,945	61.03	1,242	38.97	703	22.06	3,187
Taliaferro	513	60.71	332	39.29	181	21.42	845
Tattnall	1,872	25.94	5,344	74.06	-3,472	-48.12	7,216
Taylor	1,350	38.93	2,118	61.07	-768	-22.15	3,468
Telfair	1,348	35.06	2,497	64.94	-1,149	-29.88	3,845
Terrell	2,256	54.70	1,868	45.30	388	9.41	4,124
Thomas	7,647	39.78	11,577	60.22	-3,930	-20.44	19,224
Tift	4,726	32.80	9,681	67.20	-4,955	-34.39	14,407
Toombs	2,511	26.75	6,877	73.25	-4,366	-46.51	9,388
Towns	1,394	19.26	5,842	80.74	-4,448	-61.47	7,236
Treutlen	847	31.30	1,859	68.70	-1,012	-37.40	2,706
Troup	10,504	39.95	15,788	60.05	-5,284	-20.10	26,292
Turner	1,305	38.27	2,105	61.73	-800	-23.46	3,410
Twiggs	1,876	47.70	2,057	52.30	-181	-4.60	3,933
Union	2,570	18.12	11,613	81.88	-9,043	-63.76	14,183
Upson	3,833	34.30	7,342	65.70	-3,509	-31.40	11,175
Walker	4,891	20.25	19,268	79.75	-14,377	-59.51	24,159
Walton	11,583	25.46	33,908	74.54	-22,325	-49.08	45,491
Ware	3,704	30.36	8,498	69.64	-4,794	-39.29	12,202
Warren	1,387	56.24	1,079	43.76	308	12.49	2,466
Washington	4,368	51.21	4,161	48.79	207	2.43	8,529
Wayne	2,488	22.19	8,724	77.81	-6,236	-55.62	11,212
Webster	554	44.18	700	55.82	-146	-11.64	1,254
Wheeler	627	31.21	1,382	68.79	-755	-37.58	2,009
White	2,222	16.72	11,071	83.28	-8,849	-66.57	13,293
Whitfield	9,245	29.12	22,501	70.88	-13,256	-41.76	31,746
Wilcox	763	26.79	2,085	73.21	-1,322	-46.42	2,848
Wilkes	1,949	43.03	2,580	56.97	-631	-13.93	4,529
Wilkinson	1,960	45.51	2,347	54.49	-387	-8.99	4,307
Worth	2,229	26.91	6,053	73.09	-3,824	-46.17	8,282
Totals	2,269,923	50.61	2,214,979	49.39	54,944	1.23	4,484,902

Counties that flipped from Republican to Democratic

- Cobb (largest municipality: Marietta)
- Gwinnett (largest municipality: Peachtree Corners)

Counties that flipped from Democratic to Republican

- Baker (largest municipality: Newton)
- Burke (largest municipality: Waynesboro)
- Chattahoochee (largest municipality: Cusseta)
- Dooly (largest municipality: Vienna)
- Twiggs (largest municipality: Jeffersonville)

==== By congressional district ====
Despite losing the statewide runoff, Perdue held onto the eight congressional districts he had previously won in the general election.

District	Perdue	Ossoff	Elected Representative
1st	56%	44%	Buddy Carter
2nd	43%	57%	Sanford Bishop
3rd	62%	38%	Drew Ferguson
4th	19%	81%	Hank Johnson
5th	13%	87%	Nikema Williams
6th	47%	53%	Lucy McBath
7th	47%	53%	Carolyn Bourdeaux
8th	62%	38%	Austin Scott
9th	77%	23%	Andrew Clyde
10th	60%	40%	Jody Hice
11th	59%	41%	Barry Loudermilk
12th	56%	44%	Rick W. Allen
13th	22%	78%	David Scott
14th	74%	26%	Marjorie Taylor Greene

== See also ==
- Fair Fight Action
- Voter suppression in the United States 2019–2020: Georgia
- 2020 Georgia (U.S. state) elections

== Notes ==
Partisan clients

Voter samples and additional candidates
