= 2020 United States presidential election in Kansas =

- November 3, 2020
- Turnout: 65.9% ▲

Nominee	Donald Trump	Joe Biden
Party	Republican	Democratic
Home state	Florida	Delaware
Running mate	Mike Pence	Kamala Harris
Electoral vote	6	0
Popular vote	771,406	570,323
Percentage	56.14%	41.51%

Trump
40–50%
50–60%
60–70%
70–80%
80–90%
90–100%
Biden
40–50%
50–60%
60–70%
70–80%
80–90%
90–100%
Tie/No Data
President before election
Donald Trump
Republican
Elected President
Joe Biden
Democratic

The 2020 United States presidential election in Kansas was held on Tuesday, November 3, 2020, as part of the 2020 United States presidential election in which all 50 states plus the District of Columbia participated. Kansas voters chose electors to represent them in the Electoral College via a popular vote, pitting the Republican Party's nominee, incumbent President Donald Trump of Florida, and running mate Vice President Mike Pence of Indiana against Democratic Party nominee, former Vice President Joe Biden of Delaware, and his running mate Senator Kamala Harris of California. Kansas has six electoral votes in the Electoral College.

Although Trump won the state, Biden's 41.51 percent vote share represented the highest for a Democratic presidential nominee since Barack Obama's performance in 2008 and among the strongest swings to Biden, relative to Hillary Clinton's performance in 2016, in the nation. His 14.63-point defeat represented the first time since 1916, and only the second time ever, that Kansas voted more Democratic than neighboring Missouri, where his margin of defeat was 15.39 points. This trend repeated in 2024, with Kamala Harris's 16 point defeat in Kansas less than her 18.4 point defeat in Missouri.

Per exit polls by the Associated Press, Trump's strength in Kansas came from white voters, who supported Trump by 59%–38%; white voters with college degrees, however, were tied. This result included a 64% showing for Trump among Protestants and a 74% showing among other Christians. Trump's best margin was 72% in rural areas, while Biden's was 52% in suburban counties.

== Primary elections ==
=== Canceled Republican primary ===
On September 7, 2019, the Kansas Republican Party became one of several state GOP parties to cancel their respective primaries and caucuses officially. Donald Trump's re-election campaign and GOP officials have cited the fact that Republicans canceled several state primaries when George H. W. Bush and George W. Bush sought a second term in 1992 and 2004, respectively; and Democrats scrapped some of their primaries when Bill Clinton and Barack Obama were seeking reelection in 1996 and 2012, respectively. At its state convention held between January 31 and February 1, 2020, the state party voted to formally bind all 39 of its national pledged delegates to Trump.

=== Democratic primary ===
The Kansas Democratic primary was conducted entirely by mail. Votes were counted on May 2, 2020. Joe Biden was declared the winner.

2020 Kansas Democratic presidential primary final results
Candidate	Votes	%	Delegates
Joe Biden	110,041	74.92	29
Bernie Sanders (withdrawn)	33,142	22.57	10
Inactive votes (Note: Votes which had all its 5 ranked vote-choices allocated towards eliminated candidates who did not reach the threshold of 15%.)	3,690	2.51	
Total	146,873	100%	39

== General election ==
=== Predictions ===
Source	Ranking	As of
The Cook Political Report	Likely R	September 10, 2020
Inside Elections	Lean R	September 4, 2020
Sabato's Crystal Ball	Likely R	July 14, 2020
Politico	Likely R	October 16, 2020
RCP	Safe R	August 3, 2020
Niskanen	Safe R	July 26, 2020
CNN	Safe R	August 3, 2020
The Economist	Safe R	September 2, 2020
CBS News	Likely R	August 16, 2020
270towin	Safe R	August 2, 2020
ABC News	Safe R	July 31, 2020
NPR	Likely R	August 3, 2020
NBC News	Likely R	August 6, 2020
538	Safe R	November 2, 2020

=== Polling ===
View source data.

==== Aggregate polls ====
Source of poll aggregation	Dates administered	Dates updated	Joe Biden Democratic	Donald Trump Republican	Other/ Undecided (Note: Calculated by taking the difference of 100% and all other candidates combined.)	Margin
270 to Win	October 17–22, 2020	November 3, 2020	43.0%	51.7%	5.3%	Trump +8.7
FiveThirtyEight	until November 2, 2020	November 3, 2020	41.0%	53.9%	5.1%	Trump +12.9
Average			42.0%	52.8%	5.2%	Trump +10.8

==== Polls ====
Poll source	Date(s) administered	Sample size (Note: Key: A – all adults RV – registered voters LV – likely voters V – unclear)	Margin of error	Donald Trump Republican	Joe Biden Democratic	Jo Jorgensen Libertarian	Other	Undecided
SurveyMonkey/Axios	Oct 20 – Nov 2, 2020	2,321 (LV)	± 3%	55% (Note: Overlapping sample with the previous SurveyMonkey/Axios poll, but more information available regarding sample size)	44%	–	–	–
Data For Progress	Oct 27 – Nov 1, 2020	1,121 (LV)	± 2.9%	55%	41%	3%	2% (Note: Hawkins (G) and "Other candidate/write-in" with 1%)	–
SurveyMonkey/Axios	Oct 1–28, 2020	3,442 (LV)	± 2.5%	51%	47%	–	–	–
PPP/Protect Our Care (Note: Protect Our Care is a pro-Affordable Care Act organization)	Oct 19–20, 2020	897 (V)	± 3.3%	54%	42%	–	–	4%
Siena College/NYT Upshot	Oct 18–20, 2020	755 (LV)	± 4%	48%	41%	4%	2% (Note: "Someone else" and would not vote with 1%)	6% (Note: Includes "Refused")
co/efficient/Keep Kansas Great PAC (Note: Keep Kansas Great PAC endorsed Marshall prior to this poll's sampling period)	Oct 18–20, 2020	2,453 (LV)	± 3.7%	56%	39%	2%	–	3%
Fort Hays State University	Sep 21 – Oct 1, 2020	306 (RV)	± 4.8%	52%	38%	–	11% (Note: "Neither of the two candidates" with 11%)	–
SurveyMonkey/Axios	Sep 1–30, 2020	1,135 (LV)	–	52%	47%	–	–	1%
Civiqs/Daily Kos	Sep 26–29, 2020	677 (LV)	± 4.5%	52%	42%	–	4% (Note: "Someone else" with 4%)	1%
Data For Progress (D)	Sep 14–19, 2020	883 (LV)	± 3.3%	48% (Note: Standard VI response)	42%	3%	1% (Note: Hawkins (G) with 1%)	7%
Data For Progress (D)	Sep 14–19, 2020	883 (LV)	± 3.3%	49% (Note: If only Trump and Biden were candidates)	45%	–	–	6%
co/efficient/Keep Kansas Great PAC	Sep 15–16, 2020	794 (LV)	± 3.5%	53%	41%	–	–	–
SurveyMonkey/Axios	Aug 1–31, 2020	922 (LV)	–	54%	45%	–	–	1%
SurveyUSA	Aug 5–9, 2020	1,202 (LV)	± 3.3%	48%	41%	–	5% (Note: "Some other candidate" with 5%)	6%
Public Policy Polling (Note: Poll for EMILY's List, a Democratic PAC which seeks to elect pro-choice Democratic women to office)	Aug 5–6, 2020	864 (V)	± 3.3%	50%	43%	–	–	7%
SurveyMonkey/Axios	Jul 1–31, 2020	1,295 (LV)	–	51%	47%	–	–	2%
SurveyMonkey/Axios	Jun 8–30, 2020	466 (LV)	–	53%	45%	–	–	2%
Civiqs/Daily Kos	May 30 – Jun 1, 2020	699 (RV)	± 4.2%	52%	40%	–	6% (Note: "Someone else" with 6%)	2%
The Progress Campaign (D)	Apr 15–22, 2020	1,632 (LV)	± 4.7%	51%	41%	–	–	8%
Public Policy Polling	Mar 10–11, 2020	1,567 (V)	–	52%	40%	–	–	8%
DFM Research	Jan 30 – Feb 6, 2020	600 (A)	±4%	51%	43%	–	3% (Note: "Someone else" with 3%)	3%

Former candidates

Donald Trump vs. Michael Bloomberg

Poll source	Date(s) administered	Sample size	Margin of error	Donald Trump (R)	Michael Bloomberg (D)	Other	Undecided
DFM Research	Jan 30 – Feb 6, 2020	600 (A)	±4%	50%	43%	2% (Note: "Someone else" with 2%)	4%

Donald Trump vs. Pete Buttigieg

Poll source	Date(s) administered	Sample size	Margin of error	Donald Trump (R)	Pete Buttigieg (D)	Undecided
The Progress Campaign (D)	Feb 17, 2020	572 (RV)	± 5.2%	51%	40%	10%

Donald Trump vs. Bernie Sanders

Poll source	Date(s) administered	Sample size	Margin of error	Donald Trump (R)	Bernie Sanders (D)	Other	Undecided
Public Policy Polling	Mar 10–11, 2020	1,567 (V)	–	52%	40%	–	7%
The Progress Campaign (D)	Feb 17, 2020	572 (RV)	± 5.2%	63%	26%	–	11%
DFM Research	Jan 30 – Feb 6, 2020	600 (A)	±4%	53%	43%	2%	1%

Donald Trump vs. Elizabeth Warren

Poll source	Date(s) administered	Sample size	Margin of error	Donald Trump (R)	Elizabeth Warren (D)	Other	Undecided
The Progress Campaign (D)	Feb 17, 2020	572 (RV)	± 5.2%	63%	32%	–	5%
DFM Research	Jan 30 – Feb 6, 2020	600 (A)	±4%	53%	41%	3%	3%

=== Results ===
2020 United States presidential election in Kansas
Party	Candidate	Votes	%	±%
Republican	Donald Trump Mike Pence	771,406	56.14%	+0.11%
Democratic	Joe Biden Kamala Harris	570,323	41.51%	+5.85%
Libertarian	Jo Jorgensen Spike Cohen	30,574	2.23%	−2.40%
Green	Howie Hawkins (write-in) Angela Walker (write-in)	669	0.05%	−1.91%
American Solidarity	Brian Carroll (write-in) Amar Patel (write-in)	579	0.04%	N/A
Independent	Kanye West (write-in) Michelle Tidball (write-in)	332	0.02%	N/A
Write-in		103	0.01%	N/A
Total votes		1,373,986	100%	

==== By county ====
County	Donald Trump Republican		Joe Biden Democratic		Various candidates Other parties		Margin		Total
County	#	%	#	%	#	%	#	%	Total
Allen	4,218	71.59%	1,570	26.65%	104	1.77%	2,648	44.94%	5,892
Anderson	2,929	77.24%	782	20.62%	81	2.14%	2,147	56.62%	3,792
Atchison	4,906	65.94%	2,359	31.71%	175	2.35%	2,547	34.23%	7,440
Barber	2,014	85.99%	291	12.43%	37	1.58%	1,723	73.57%	2,342
Barton	8,608	77.20%	2,340	20.99%	202	1.64%	6,288	56.21%	11,130
Bourbon	5,023	75.24%	1,541	23.08%	112	1.68%	3,482	52.16%	6,676
Brown	3,262	72.96%	1,104	24.69%	105	2.35%	2,158	48.27%	4,471
Butler	22,634	69.60%	9,181	28.23%	705	2.17%	13,453	41.37%	32,520
Chase	1,123	75.32%	345	23.14%	23	1.54%	778	52.18%	1,491
Chautauqua	1,402	85.28%	212	12.90%	30	1.82%	1,190	72.38%	1,644
Cherokee	6,766	73.94%	2,194	23.98%	191	2.09%	4,572	49.96%	9,151
Cheyenne	1,183	82.79%	224	15.68%	22	1.54%	959	67.11%	1,429
Clark	904	84.72%	143	13.40%	20	1.87%	761	71.32%	1,067
Clay	3,177	75.97%	894	21.38%	111	2.65%	2,283	54.59%	4,182
Cloud	3,242	76.05%	920	21.58%	101	2.37%	2,322	54.47%	4,263
Coffey	3,489	76.43%	964	21.12%	112	2.45%	2,525	55.31%	4,565
Comanche	762	83.19%	126	13.76%	28	3.06%	636	69.43%	916
Cowley	9,656	67.85%	4,273	30.03%	302	2.12%	5,383	37.83%	14,231
Crawford	10,045	60.08%	6,179	36.96%	494	2.95%	3,866	23.12%	16,718
Decatur	1,260	84.11%	218	14.55%	20	1.34%	1,042	69.56%	1,498
Dickinson	7,126	76.22%	2,060	22.03%	163	1.74%	5,066	54.19%	9,349
Doniphan	2,976	80.24%	686	18.50%	47	1.27%	2,290	61.74%	3,709
Douglas	17,286	28.84%	40,785	68.04%	1,870	3.12%	-23,499	-39.20%	59,941
Edwards	1,141	79.73%	271	18.94%	19	1.33%	870	60.80%	1,431
Elk	1,140	83.76%	195	14.33%	26	1.91%	945	69.43%	1,361
Ellis	9,758	70.42%	3,737	26.97%	361	2.61%	6,021	43.45%	13,856
Ellsworth	2,148	75.29%	648	22.71%	57	2.00%	1,500	52.58%	2,853
Finney	7,236	61.08%	4,325	36.51%	285	2.41%	2,911	24.57%	11,846
Ford	5,803	65.09%	2,947	33.06%	165	1.85%	2,856	32.04%	8,915
Franklin	8,479	67.96%	3,690	29.57%	308	2.47%	4,789	38.38%	12,477
Geary	5,323	55.43%	3,983	41.48%	297	3.09%	1,340	13.95%	9,603
Gove	1,291	87.76%	166	11.28%	14	0.95%	1,125	76.48%	1,471
Graham	1,080	80.78%	228	17.05%	29	2.17%	852	63.72%	1,337
Grant	1,936	77.41%	518	20.71%	47	1.88%	1,418	56.70%	2,501
Gray	1,911	83.52%	341	14.90%	36	1.57%	1,570	68.62%	2,288
Greeley	549	85.65%	78	12.17%	14	2.18%	471	73.48%	641
Greenwood	2,444	79.43%	569	18.49%	64	2.08%	1,875	60.94%	3,077
Hamilton	698	81.26%	141	16.41%	20	2.33%	557	64.84%	859
Harper	2,168	80.96%	461	17.21%	49	1.83%	1,707	63.74%	2,678
Harvey	10,182	58.52%	6,747	38.78%	470	2.70%	3,435	19.74%	17,399
Haskell	1,122	79.57%	268	19.01%	20	1.42%	854	60.57%	1,410
Hodgeman	875	83.73%	154	14.74%	16	1.53%	721	69.00%	1,045
Jackson	4,517	68.61%	1,881	28.57%	186	2.83%	2,636	40.04%	6,584
Jefferson	6,334	64.75%	3,194	32.65%	254	2.60%	3,140	32.10%	9,782
Jewell	1,387	85.20%	212	13.02%	29	1.78%	1,175	72.17%	1,628
Johnson	155,631	44.54%	184,259	52.74%	9,496	2.72%	-28,628	-8.20%	349,386
Kearny	1,164	80.00%	267	18.35%	24	1.65%	897	61.65%	1,455
Kingman	3,130	79.26%	752	19.04%	67	1.70%	2,378	60.22%	3,949
Kiowa	980	84.12%	156	13.39%	29	2.49%	824	70.73%	1,165
Labette	5,735	66.97%	2,655	31.01%	173	2.02%	3,080	35.97%	8,563
Lane	762	85.14%	115	12.85%	18	2.01%	647	72.29%	895
Leavenworth	21,610	59.22%	13,886	38.05%	994	2.72%	7,724	21.17%	36,490
Lincoln	1,283	81.25%	266	16.85%	30	1.90%	1,017	64.41%	1,579
Linn	4,048	80.22%	896	17.76%	102	2.02%	3,152	62.47%	5,046
Logan	1,249	85.67%	186	12.76%	23	1.58%	1,063	72.91%	1,458
Lyon	7,550	53.74%	6,055	43.10%	444	3.16%	1,495	10.64%	14,049
Marion	4,465	73.06%	1,516	24.81%	130	2.13%	2,949	48.26%	6,111
Marshall	3,729	72.92%	1,259	24.62%	126	2.46%	2,470	48.30%	5,114
McPherson	9,964	69.01%	4,134	28.63%	340	2.35%	5,830	40.38%	14,438
Meade	1,523	83.45%	263	14.41%	39	2.14%	1,260	69.04%	1,825
Miami	12,308	68.42%	5,247	29.17%	434	2.41%	7,061	39.25%	17,989
Mitchell	2,504	80.75%	558	17.99%	39	1.26%	1,946	62.75%	3,101
Montgomery	9,931	73.97%	3,228	24.04%	267	1.99%	6,703	49.93%	13,426
Morris	2,124	73.27%	729	25.15%	46	1.59%	1,395	48.12%	2,899
Morton	1,034	86.31%	150	12.52%	14	1.17%	884	73.79%	1,198
Nemaha	4,664	82.05%	927	16.31%	93	1.64%	3,737	65.75%	5,684
Neosho	4,970	72.27%	1,796	26.12%	111	1.61%	3,174	46.15%	6,877
Ness	1,339	88.50%	149	9.85%	25	1.65%	1,190	78.65%	1,513
Norton	2,007	83.11%	364	15.07%	44	1.82%	1,643	68.03%	2,415
Osage	5,705	71.00%	2,136	26.58%	194	2.41%	3,569	44.42%	8,035
Osborne	1,629	83.75%	281	14.45%	35	1.80%	1,348	69.31%	1,945
Ottawa	2,610	81.79%	506	15.86%	75	2.35%	2,104	65.94%	3,191
Pawnee	2,045	74.66%	643	23.48%	51	1.86%	1,402	51.19%	2,739
Phillips	2,418	86.95%	318	11.43%	45	1.62%	2,100	75.51%	2,781
Pottawatomie	9,452	72.25%	3,313	25.32%	318	2.43%	6,139	46.92%	13,083
Pratt	3,108	75.13%	933	22.55%	96	2.32%	2,175	52.57%	4,137
Rawlins	1,261	83.84%	214	14.23%	29	1.93%	1,047	69.61%	1,504
Reno	18,443	65.73%	8,886	31.67%	731	2.61%	9,557	34.06%	28,060
Republic	2,182	82.12%	424	15.96%	51	1.92%	1,758	66.16%	2,657
Rice	3,262	75.53%	965	22.34%	92	2.13%	2,297	53.18%	4,319
Riley	11,610	46.12%	12,765	50.71%	796	3.16%	-1,155	-4.59%	25,171
Rooks	2,325	86.14%	339	12.56%	35	1.30%	1,986	73.58%	2,699
Rush	1,350	80.50%	295	17.59%	32	1.91%	1,055	62.91%	1,677
Russell	2,790	80.47%	600	17.31%	77	2.22%	2,190	63.17%	3,467
Saline	15,722	63.85%	8,214	33.36%	688	2.79%	7,508	30.49%	24,624
Scott	2,014	85.56%	299	12.70%	41	1.74%	1,715	72.85%	2,354
Sedgwick	122,416	54.44%	95,870	42.64%	6,576	2.92%	26,546	11.80%	224,862
Seward	3,372	63.69%	1,833	34.62%	89	1.68%	1,539	29.07%	5,294
Shawnee	40,443	46.96%	43,015	49.95%	2,664	3.09%	-2,572	-2.99%	86,122
Sheridan	1,282	88.72%	147	10.17%	16	1.11%	1,135	78.55%	1,445
Sherman	2,269	83.20%	396	14.52%	62	2.27%	1,873	68.68%	2,727
Smith	1,763	82.81%	336	15.78%	30	1.41%	1,427	67.03%	2,129
Stafford	1,645	80.88%	357	17.55%	32	1.57%	1,288	63.32%	2,034
Stanton	614	79.12%	148	19.07%	14	1.80%	466	60.05%	776
Stevens	1,760	86.66%	237	11.67%	34	1.67%	1,523	74.99%	2,031
Sumner	8,105	74.17%	2,591	23.71%	232	2.12%	5,514	50.46%	10,928
Thomas	3,130	82.15%	625	16.40%	55	1.44%	2,505	65.75%	3,810
Trego	1,363	83.62%	242	14.85%	25	1.53%	1,121	68.77%	1,630
Wabaunsee	2,845	72.91%	964	24.71%	93	2.38%	1,881	48.21%	3,902
Wallace	770	93.33%	44	5.33%	11	1.33%	726	88.00%	825
Washington	2,363	81.96%	475	16.48%	45	1.56%	1,888	65.49%	2,883
Wichita	808	83.47%	149	15.39%	11	1.14%	659	68.08%	968
Wilson	3,153	79.74%	723	18.29%	78	1.97%	2,430	61.46%	3,954
Woodson	1,228	79.43%	294	19.02%	24	1.55%	934	60.41%	1,546
Wyandotte	18,934	33.18%	36,788	64.46%	1,349	2.36%	-17,854	-31.28%	57,071
Totals	771,406	56.00%	570,323	41.40%	35,755	2.60%	201,083	14.60%	1,377,484

Counties that flipped from Republican to Democratic

- Johnson (largest municipality: Overland Park)
- Riley (largest municipality: Manhattan)
- Shawnee (largest municipality: Topeka)

==== By congressional district ====
Trump won three of Kansas' four congressional districts.

District	Trump	Biden	Representative
1st	69.7%	28.1%	Roger Marshall
1st	69.7%	28.1%	Tracey Mann
2nd	56.3%	41.3%	Steve Watkins
2nd	56.3%	41.3%	Jake LaTurner
3rd	43.7%	54.3%	Sharice Davids
4th	59.7%	38%	Ron Estes

== Analysis ==
Biden's gains relative to Hillary Clinton were powered by significant improvement in Kansas' suburbs and college towns: he became the first Democrat to carry Johnson County, the state's most populous and home to Overland Park and Olathe, since Woodrow Wilson in 1916. It was also the first since 1896 that Democrats received a majority in the county. Biden was also the first Democrat ever to win Riley County, anchored by the Fort Riley military installation and Kansas State University; and the first to win Shawnee County, home to the state capital of Topeka, since Bill Clinton's narrow plurality in 1992.

While he failed to break the 56-year Republican winning streak in Sedgwick County, the second most populous in the state and home to the state's largest city Wichita, his 42.9 percent of the vote there was the strongest for a Democrat since Jimmy Carter received 46.5 percent of the vote in 1976. Biden would also build upon Hillary Clinton's share (32.31%) and even break Carter's record at Seward County of 33.96%. At 34.62%, this was the highest percentage of votes a Democratic presidential candidate has won in the county since Lyndon B. Johnson won 46.14% in 1964. This was also the first election since the three-way contest of 1992 in which a Democratic candidate won at least five counties, along with it being the smallest margin of victory for a Republican nominee since George Bush in 1992.

== Notes ==
Partisan clients

== See also ==
- United States presidential elections in Kansas
- 2020 United States presidential election
- 2020 Democratic Party presidential primaries
- 2020 Republican Party presidential primaries
- 2020 United States elections
