= Ted Terry (politician) =

Former mayor of Clarkston, Georgia (born 1983)

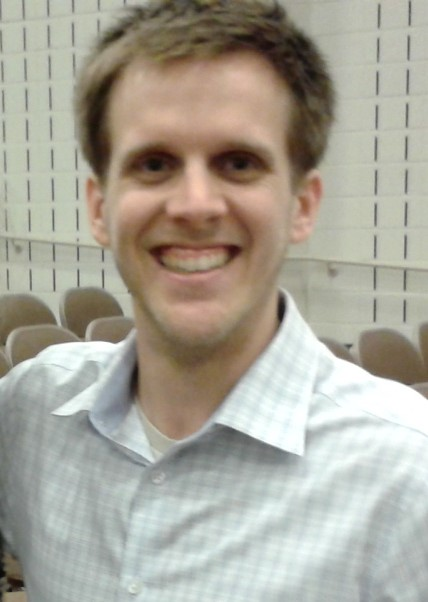

Member of the DeKalb County Commission from the 6th district
- Incumbent
- Assumed office January 1, 2021
- Preceded by: Kathie Gannon

Mayor of Clarkston
- In office January 7, 2014 – March 5, 2020
- Preceded by: Emanuel Ransom
- Succeeded by: Awet Eyasu (acting)

Personal details
- Born: Edward Terry; 1983 (age 42–43) Tallahassee, Florida, U.S.
- Party: Democratic
- Education: University of Florida (BS)
- Website: Campaign website

Edward Terry (born 1983) is an American politician who served as mayor of Clarkston, Georgia, from 2014 to 2020. Terry was a candidate in the 2020–21 United States Senate election in Georgia. In January 2020, Terry withdrew from the election and announced his candidacy for the DeKalb County Commission. Terry placed first in the August 2020 Democratic primary and faced no opposition in the general election.

== Early life and education ==
Terry graduated from the University of Florida in 2005, with a Bachelor of Science in food science and human nutrition. While completing his degree, he worked as a nursing assistant at a long-term care facility.

== Career ==
After graduating from college, Terry worked as a field organizer for the Democratic National Committee and the Democratic Party of Georgia. He was a finance director for U.S. Representative John Barrow. He moved to Clarkston in 2011, and worked in nonprofit consulting and development.

=== Mayor of Clarkston ===
==== First term ====
Terry was elected mayor of Clarkston, Georgia on November 5, 2013, with 53% of the vote. He took office in January 2014, and became the youngest mayor in Clarkston's 135-year history. In his first year of office, he presided over a city council that ended Clarkston's moratorium on refugee resettlement, made Clarkston a charted City of Compassion and Welcoming City, and signed the Supreme Court Amicus Brief in support of legalizing same-sex marriage. In his second year of office, he presided over a city council that raised the minimum wage to $15/hour, made Election Day a holiday, and decriminalized marijuana possession.

He was also the director of Georgia's chapter of the Sierra Club and a member of the DeKalb County Board of Health.

==== Second term ====
Terry was re-elected mayor on November 7, 2017, with 59% of the vote. During his second term, he presided over a city council that committed Clarkston to one hundred percent clean energy by 2050, approved the first ever tiny home neighborhood in Georgia, and became the third city in Georgia to pass a non-discrimination ordinance.

He also spoke on refugee resettlement issues at the Global Compact on Migration in Marrakech, Morocco, attended the Young Policy Network of Migration convention in Münchenwiler, Switzerland, and was appointed to serve on the advisory board of the Global Village Project.

=== 2020 Senate election ===
In July 2019, he announced that he would run for the Democratic nomination in the 2020–21 United States Senate election in Georgia. In January 2020, Terry announced he was withdrawing from the race due to the struggle to raise enough money to compete in the race being a principal concern.

=== 2020 DeKalb County Commission election ===
In January 2020, he announced he would seek the Democratic nomination for the DeKalb County (GA) Commission Super District 6 seat. He won the nomination in the August 11th runoff election with 58.6% of the vote. No Republican qualified for this district seat, thus Terry won by default. Terry's term began on January 1, 2021.

== Personal life ==
Terry appeared in the second season of Queer Eye in 2018. The show portrayed that he was nominated by his girlfriend Andrea Cervone, but Terry later revealed that the show's producers sought him out.
