= Anne Allen Westbrook =

American politician

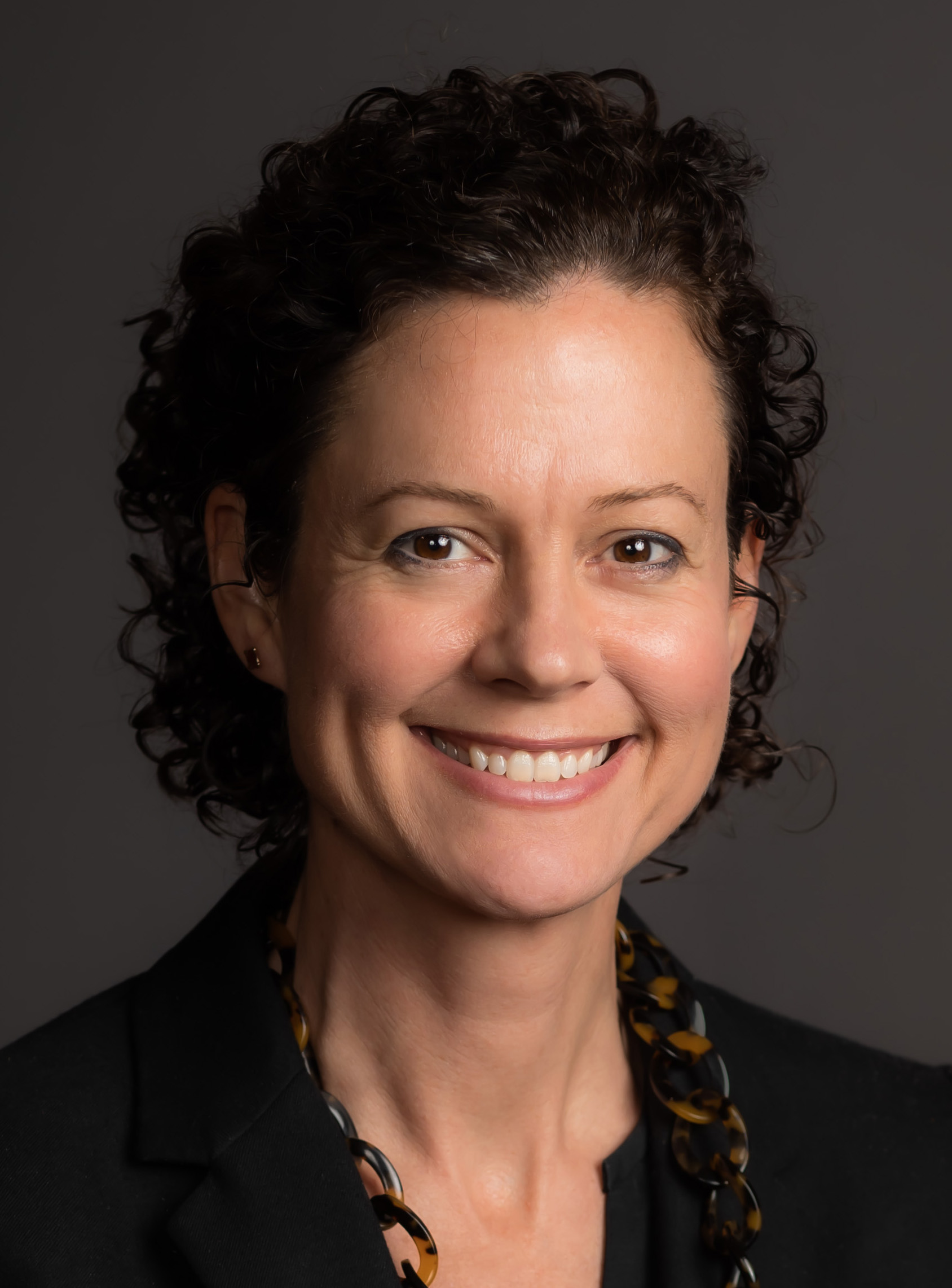

Member of the Georgia House of Representatives from the 163rd district
- Incumbent
- Assumed office January 9, 2023
- Preceded by: Derek Mallow (redistricting)

Personal details
- Party: Democratic
- Spouse: Todd Baiad
- Children: 3 (including 1 stepchild)
- Education: Hollins College (B.A.); University of Georgia (J.D.)
- Occupation: Attorney

Anne Allen Westbrook is an American politician from the Democratic Party of Georgia who serves as a member of the Georgia House of Representatives representing District 163.

Westbrook is an attorney and was a legislative aide to former state representative Edna Jackson. Westbrook narrowly lost the 2020 election to Derek Mallow by just 19 votes.

Following the withdrawal of Joe Biden from the 2024 United States presidential election, Westbrook endorsed the Kamala Harris 2024 presidential campaign.
