= J. Craig Gordon =

American politician (born 1977)

Member of the Georgia House of Representatives from the 163rd district
- In office January 14, 2013 – January 11, 2021
- Preceded by: Ben Watson
- Succeeded by: Derek Mallow

Member of the Georgia House of Representatives from the 162nd district
- In office January 8, 2007 – January 14, 2013
- Preceded by: Tom Bordeaux
- Succeeded by: Bob Bryant

Personal details
- Born: May 7, 1977 (age 49) Savannah, Georgia
- Party: Democratic
- Education: Armstrong Atlantic State University
- Website: J. Craig Gordon

J. Craig Gordon (born May 7, 1977) is a former member of the Georgia House of Representatives and a member of the Democratic Party representing the state's 163rd district.

== Personal life and education ==
Gordon was born in Savannah, Georgia and attended Armstrong Atlantic State University, graduating in 2000.

== Career ==
Gordon was first elected to the Georgia House in 2006. Gordon serves on the Economic Development & Tourism, Health & Human Services, Retirement, and Special Rules committees.

In 2013, Gordon introduced a bill that would study the possibility of a high-speed rail line between Savannah, Georgia and Atlanta, Georgia. Gordon also supports deepening the shipping channel of the Savannah River.

Gordon is the CEO of Statewide Healthcare, and also worked at the Savannah International Trade Center. In 2011, Gordon acknowledged under-reporting state payments to Statewide Healthcare, attributing to the incident to a mistake he made while being in a hurry.

Gordon announced that he would not run again in 2020 to represent the 163rd district; he stepped down in January 2021.
