= Jesse Petrea =

American politician

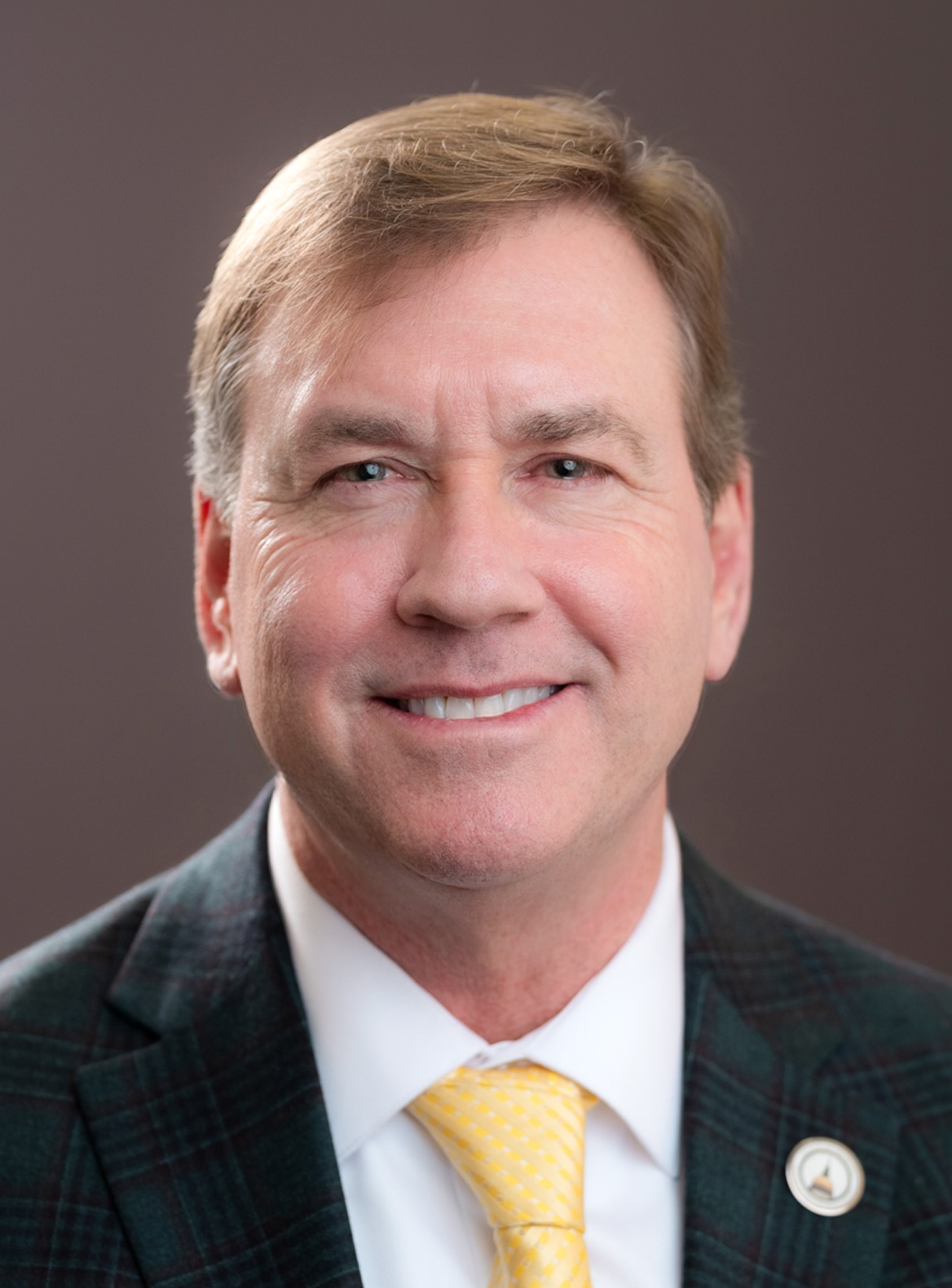
- Official headshot

Member of the Georgia House of Representatives from the 166th district
- Incumbent
- Assumed office January 12, 2015
- Preceded by: Ben Watson

Personal details
- Born: June 24, 1966 (age 60) Savannah, Georgia, U.S.
- Party: Republican
- Education: Georgia Southern University, Armstrong (BS)

Jesse Lewis Petrea III (born June 24, 1966) is an American politician who has served in the Georgia House of Representatives from the 166th district since 2015. He is a member of the Republican Party.
