= Georgia's 2nd Senate district =

American legislative district

Georgia's 2nd State Senate district
Senator
Derek Mallow; D–Savannah
- Demographics: 36.40% White; 47.51% Black; 8.36% Hispanic; 3.40% Asian; 0.21% Native American; 0.15% Hawaiian/Pacific Islander; 0.46% Other; 4.41% Multiracial
- Population (2020) • Voting age: 190,408; 150,843

District 2 of the Georgia Senate is a senatorial district in Southeast Georgia encompassing most of the city of Savannah and northwestern Chatham County. In addition to Savannah, the district includes Garden City, Port Wentworth, Thunderbolt, and part of Georgetown.

The current senator is Derek Mallow, a Democrat from Savannah first elected in 2022.

== District officeholders ==
Years	Senator, District 2	Counties in district
1997–1999	Diana H. Johnson (D)	Chatham (part)
1999–2001	Diana H. Johnson (D)	Chatham (part)
2001–2002	Regina D. Thomas (D)	Chatham (part)
2003–2004	Regina D. Thomas (D)	Chatham (Savannah (county seat), Garden City, Pooler, Port Wentworth, Thunderbolt)
2005–2006	Regina D. Thomas (D)	Chatham (Savannah (county seat), Garden City, Pooler, Port Wentworth, Thunderbolt)
2007–2008	Regina D. Thomas (D)	Chatham (Savannah (county seat), Garden City, Pooler, Port Wentworth, Thunderbolt)
2009–2010	Lester G. Jackson (D)	Chatham (Savannah (county seat), Garden City, Pooler, Port Wentworth, Thunderbolt)
2011–2012	Lester G. Jackson (D)	Chatham (Savannah (county seat), Garden City, Pooler, Port Wentworth, Thunderbolt)
2013–2014	Lester G. Jackson (D)	Chatham (part) (Note: A map is provided on the Georgia Senate website showing the district coverage as of 2013.)
2015–2016	Lester G. Jackson (D)	Chatham (part)
2017–2018	Lester G. Jackson (D)	Chatham (part)
2019–2020	Lester G. Jackson (D)	Chatham (part)
2021–2022	Lester G. Jackson (D)	Chatham (part)
2023–2024	Derek Mallow (D)	Chatham (part)
2025–2026	Derek Mallow (D)	Chatham (part)
