= Derek Mallow =

American politician

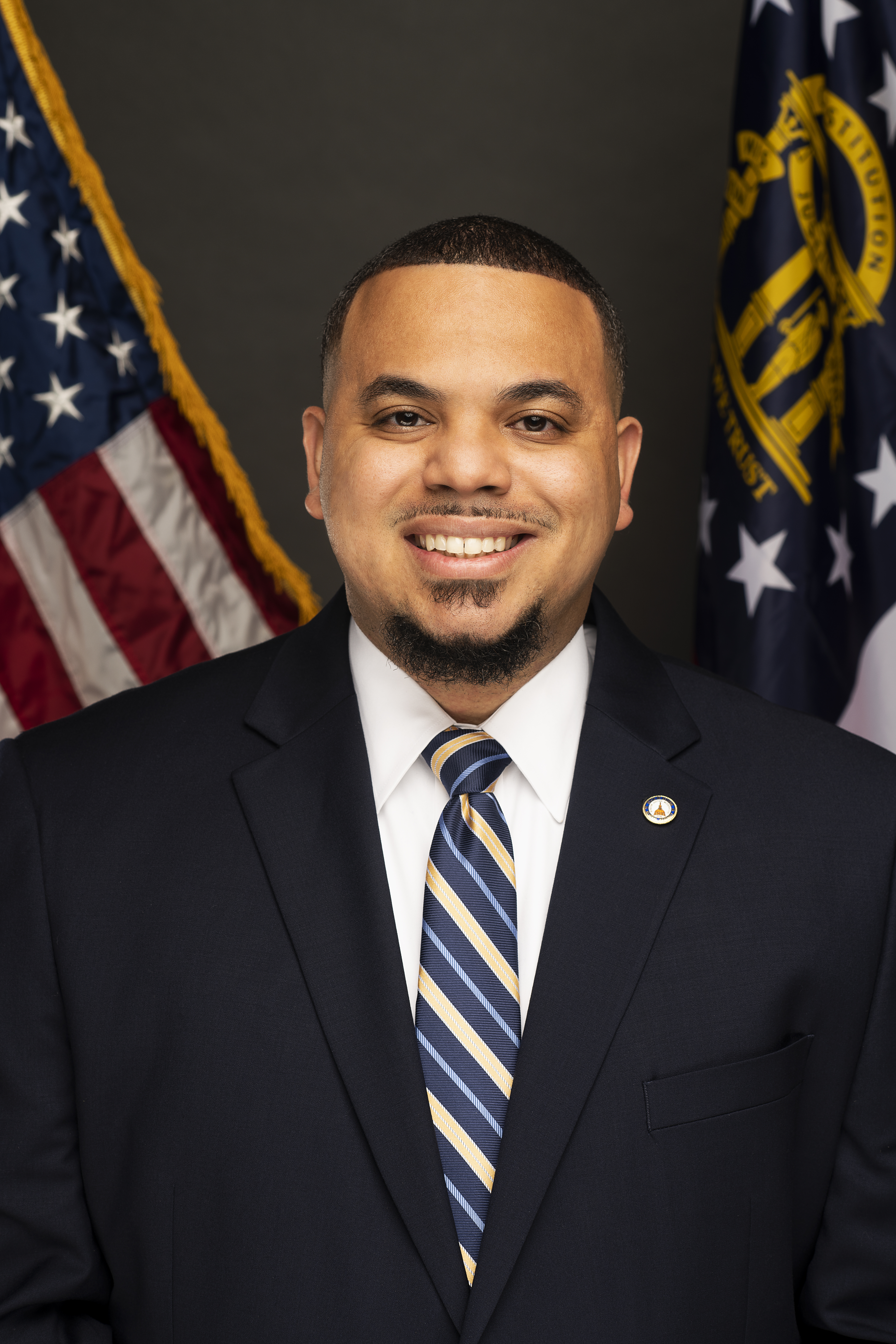

Member of the Georgia State Senate from the 2nd district
- Incumbent
- Assumed office January 9, 2023
- Preceded by: Lester Jackson

Member of the Georgia House of Representatives from the 163rd district
- In office January 11, 2021 – January 9, 2023
- Preceded by: Craig Gordon
- Succeeded by: Anne Allen Westbrook

Personal details
- Born: Derek John Mallow; June 12, 1989 (age 36)
- Party: Democratic
- Occupation: Politician

Derek John Mallow (born June 12, 1989) is an American politician from Georgia. Mallow is a Democratic member of the Georgia State Senate for the 2nd District. Prior to becoming a State Senator, Mallow was a member of the Georgia House of Representatives for the 163rd District.

Georgia House of Representatives
| Preceded by Craig Gordon | Member of the Georgia House of Representatives from the 163rd district 2021–2023 | Succeeded by Anne Allen Westbrook |
Georgia State Senate
| Preceded by Lester Jackson | Member of the Georgia Senate from the 2nd district 2023–Present | Incumbent |
