= Georgia's 166th House of Representatives district =

State district in Georgia, USA

Georgia's 166th State House of Representatives district
Representative
Jesse Petrea; R–Savannah
- Demographics: 84.0% White; 6.4% Black; 4.1% Hispanic; 3.7% Asian
- Population: 54,877

District 166 elects one member of the Georgia House of Representatives. It contains parts of Bryan County and Chatham County.

== Members ==
- Ben Watson (2013–2015)
- Jesse Petrea (since 2015)
