= Georgia's 163rd House of Representatives district =

State district in Georgia, USA

Georgia's 163rd State House of Representatives district
Representative
Anne Allen Westbrook; D–Savannah
- Demographics: 43.0% White; 50.2% Black; 3.5% Hispanic; 1.9% Asian
- Population: 20,239

District 163 elects one member of the Georgia House of Representatives. It contains parts of Chatham County.

== Members ==
- Ben Watson (2011–2013)
- J. Craig Gordon (2013–2021)
- Derek Mallow (2021–2023)
- Anne Allen Westbrook (since 2023)
