= Lester Jackson =

American politician

Lester Jackson III

Member of the Georgia State Senate from the 2nd district
- In office January 12, 2009 – January 9, 2023
- Preceded by: Regina Thomas
- Succeeded by: Derek Mallow

Personal details
- Born: Lester George Jackson III; July 26, 1959 (age 67) Savannah, Georgia, U.S.
- Party: Democratic
- Children: 4
- Education: Paine College, Meharry Medical College
- Profession: President at Gretsel Enterprises

Lester George Jackson III (born July 26, 1959) is an American dentist and politician. He is a former state senator from Chatham County, Georgia. He was the 2009 presidential appointee to the Democratic National Committee, becoming the first person from the coastal region of Georgia to serve in this capacity in over 19 years.

== Early life, family and education ==
Jackson is a lifelong resident of Savannah, Georgia. He attended Chatham County public schools. He subsequently attended Paine College in Augusta, Georgia. In 1985, he received his doctor of dental surgery degree from Meharry Medical College in Nashville, Tennessee.

== Career ==
Jackson is a U.S. Navy veteran. He is a family dentist and a Fellow of the Pierre Fauchard Academy Dental Society. He is an assistant adjunct professor at Medical College of Georgia and an adjunct professor at Armstrong Atlantic State University.

== Political career ==
In 2000, Jackson was a delegate to the Democratic National Convention in Boston; and again a delegate in Denver in 2008.

Jackson served 10 years in the House of Representatives. He was first elected to the State Senate in 2008. He served as assistant house majority whip.

As of 2013, Jackson served on the Senate Agriculture and Consumer Affairs, Economic Development, Health and Human Services, Higher Education, and Urban Affairs Committees.

== Awards and honors ==
- 1999: Georgia's Freshman Legislator of the Year by the Georgia Legislative Black Caucus
- 2000, 2002: Legislator of the Year by the Georgia Dental Association
- 2001 Distinguished Service Award from the National Dental Association
- 2008, 2010: Legislator of the Year by the Georgia Legislative Black Caucus
- 2009: Savannah Community Service Award
- 2009: Legislator of the Year Award from the Savannah State University Alumni Association

== Organizations and affiliations ==
He is a life member of the NAACP and the Kappa Alpha Psi fraternity. He is a charter member of the Savannah Chapter of the 100 Black Men. He is a member of the American Legion, Post 500.

== Personal life ==
Jackson has four children: Charity, Lester IV, Leah, and Johnathan.

== See also ==
- List of state government committees (Georgia)
