= Ben Watson (politician) =

American politician (born 1959)

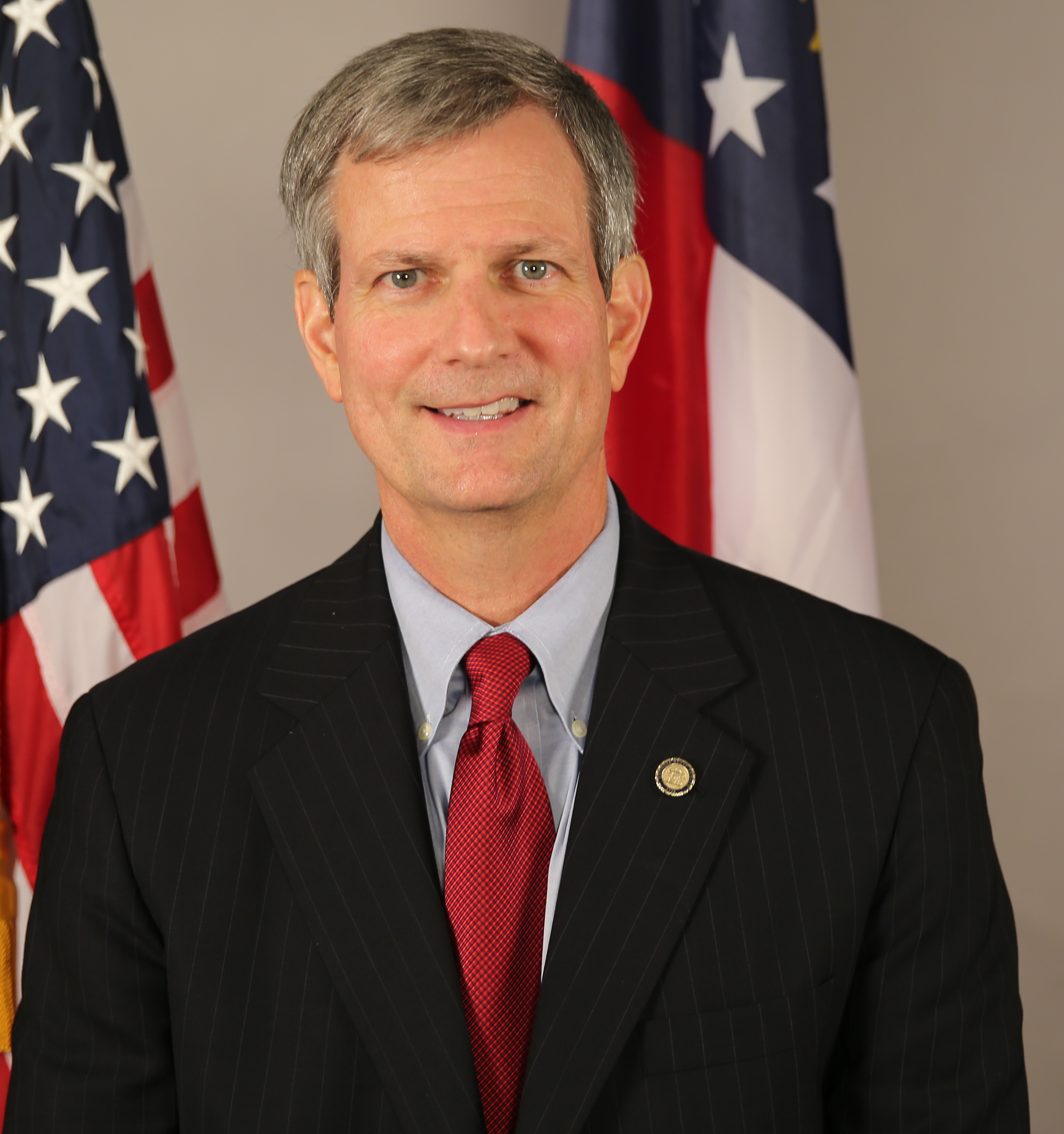

Member of the Georgia State Senate from the 1st district
- Incumbent
- Assumed office January 12, 2015
- Preceded by: Buddy Carter

Member of the Georgia House of Representatives
- In office January 10, 2011 – January 12, 2015
- Preceded by: Burke Day
- Succeeded by: Jesse Petrea
- Constituency: 163rd district (2011–2013); 166th district (2013–2015)

Personal details
- Born: Benjamin Luther Watson; July 27, 1959 (age 66) Twin City, Georgia, U.S.
- Party: Republican
- Education: University of Georgia (BA); Augusta University (MD)

Benjamin Luther Watson (born July 27, 1959) is an American politician who has served in the Georgia State Senate from the 1st District since he was elected in 2014. He previously served in the Georgia House of Representatives from 2010 to 2014. Watson is an active member of the Republican Party, and he has served on various legislative committees. Since 2019, he has chaired the State Senate's Health and Human Services committee.

== Background and education ==
According to his State Senate biography, Watson was born in 1959 and grew up in Twin City, Georgia. He now resides in Isle of Hope, Georgia with his wife, Bernice, who is a retired Savannah-Chatham Public School teacher. They have three sons. Former U.S. Representative Jack Kingston is Watson's brother-in-law.

Watson graduated high school from the Emanuel County Institute in 1977 and graduated with a BA from the University of Georgia in 1981. He earned his medical degree from the Medical College of Georgia of Augusta University.

== Career ==
Watson has practiced internal medicine at SouthCoast Medical Group since 1988, and he specializes in elderly patients. He began his career in politics with his election to the Georgia State House of Representatives in 2010. He represented the 163rd District from 2011 to 2013; as a result of redistricting, he then represented the 166th District from 2013 to 2015. In 2014, he was elected to the Georgia State Senate to represent District 1. He took over the seat from Sen. Buddy Carter, R-Pooler, who ran for a seat in Congress.

List of current legislative committees and subcommittees:

- Member, Appropriations
- Member, Appropriations Subcommittee on Economic Development
- Chair, Appropriations Subcommittee on Health and Human Development
- Chair, Health and Human Services
- Member, Judiciary
- Member, Rules
- Member, Administrative Affairs
- Member, Economic Development and Tourism [ex-officio]

List of former committees:

- Member, Georgia State Senate Appropriations Committee, present
- Member, Georgia State Senate Health and Human Services Committee, present
- Former Member, Georgia State Senate Public Safety Committee
- Former Member, Georgia State Senate Retirement Committee
- Former Member, Georgia State Senate Transportation Committee
- Former Chair, Georgia State Senate Veterans, Military, and Homeland Security Committee
- Former Vice Chair, Economic Development and Tourism Committee, Georgia State Senate
- Former Member, Ethics Committee, Georgia State Senate
- Former Member, Georgia State House of Representatives Appropriations Committee, Health Subcommittee
- Former Member, Georgia State House of Representatives Health and Human Services Committee
- Former Member, Georgia State House of Representatives Higher Education Committee
- Former Secretary, Georgia State House of Representatives Science and Technology Committee
- Former Member, Subcommittee on Abusive Billing Practices, Georgia State Senate
- Former Member, Subcommittee on Community Health, Georgia State Senate
- Former Member, Subcommittee on Insurance, Georgia State Senate
- Former Member, Subcommittee on Pharmacology, Georgia State Senate
- Former Member, Subcommittee on Healthcare Delivery and Access
- Former Member, Subcommittee on Scope of Practice, Georgia State Senate
- Former Member, Transportation, Georgia State Senate
- Former Member, Veterans, Military and Homeland Security, Georgia State Senate

In January 2024, Watson co-sponsored S.B. 390, which would withhold government funding for any libraries in Georgia affiliated with the American Library Association.

== Elections ==
=== Georgia State Senate ===
==== 2020 ====
In the November 3rd, 2020 election, Ben Watson ran for re-election to the Georgia State Senate to represent District 1 as a Republican incumbent. He initially ran against a Democratic challenger, Kerri McGinty, who withdrew from the race on September 30, 2020. Watson thus won an additional two-year term unopposed.

==== 2018 ====
Ben Watson defeated Democratic challenger Sandra Workman in the general election for Georgia State Senate District 1 on November 6, 2018. Watson received 61% of the total votes cast. Watson was not challenged in the Republican Primary.

==== 2014 - 2016 ====
Ben Watson ran unopposed in the Georgia State Senate District 1 general elections in 2014 and 2016.

=== Georgia House of Representatives ===
==== 2010 ====
In 2010, Representative Burke Day (R) did not seek reelection to District 163 in the Georgia State House of Representatives. Ben Watson, Joe Welch and Gary Wisenbaker competed in the Republican primary on July 20 for the heavily Republican seat. Watson won the primary with 64.5% of the vote to Welch's 18.7% and Wisenbaker's 16.9%. In the November 2 General Election, Watson defeated Jeremy Scheinbart (D) with 80.2% of the vote.
