= The Progress Campaign =

Political Organizing Team

- Founded: January 1, 2018
- Founder: Dan Krulwich
- Type: Political organizing group
- Purpose: Organizing for down-ballot candidates
- Website: ourprogress.org

The Progress Campaign is an American progressive political organizing group formed in January 2018 by a group of organizers to help promote down-ballot candidates in the 2018, 2019 and 2020 US election cycles. The team helped organize for hundreds of down-ballot candidates for the United States House of Representatives, State Legislatures and other statewide elections by partnering with local and state organizations, airing discussions with candidates and local university chapters and lead field organizing efforts in key swing districts across the country.

After the COVID-19 pandemic reached the United States and political ground operations were halted, the group published their key organizing tool as a forecast model for the 2020 Presidential Election. Their Presidential forecast rose to prominence being the only forecast to showcase county-level projections as well as changes to voter registration and demographic swings. According to local and state coverage of the presidential election, the forecast was one of the more optimistic of Former Vice President Joe Biden's chances in key U.S. states like Texas and Georgia while maintaining that his pathway to 270 remains outside the margin of error.

== History ==
The Progress Campaign was started by a group of organizers in early 2018 after working and volunteering on down-ballot campaigns in the 2016 and 2017 elections. After working on the 2018 midterm elections, which saw Democrats gain control of the United States House of Representatives and multiple state legislative chambers, the group became active in the 2019 elections for Kentucky Governor, Louisiana Governor and the state legislature elections in Virginia by mobilizing younger voters, organizing phone banking operations and conducting voter registration drives.
