= National Register of Historic Places listings in Pierce County, Georgia =

This is a list of properties and districts in Pierce County, Georgia, that are listed on the National Register of Historic Places (NRHP).

This National Park Service list is complete through NPS recent listings posted March 21, 2025.

== Current listings ==
	Name on the Register	Image	Date listed	Location	City or town	Description
1	Blackshear Depot	Blackshear Depot	February 10, 2000 (#00000070)	200 S. Central Ave. 31°18′10″N 82°14′28″W	Blackshear	Built in 1917
2	Pierce County Courthouse	Pierce County Courthouse	September 18, 1980 (#80001220)	Main St. 31°18′24″N 82°14′34″W	Blackshear	Built in 1902
3	Pierce County Jail	Pierce County Jail	May 28, 1980 (#80001221)	Taylor St. 31°18′11″N 82°14′24″W	Blackshear	Brick building completed in 1894, replacing an earlier building
