= Pierce County School District =

School district in Georgia (U.S. state)

Address
- 834 Main Street Blackshear, Georgia, 31516-2308; United States
- Coordinates: 31.344841°N 82.198677°W

District information
- Grades: Pre-school - 12
- Superintendent: Dara Bennett
- Accreditation(s): Southern Association of Colleges and Schools; Georgia Accrediting Commission

Students and staff
- Enrollment: 3,240
- Faculty: 216

Other information
- Telephone: (912) 449-2044
- Fax: (912) 449-2046
- Website: www.pierce.k12.ga.us

The Pierce County School District is a public school district in Pierce County, Georgia, United States, based in Blackshear. It serves the communities of Blackshear, Bristol, Jot Em Down Store, Mershon, Offerman, Otter Creek, Patterson and Waycross.

== Schools ==
The Pierce County School District has three elementary schools, one middle school, and one high school.

=== High school ===
- Pierce County High School

=== Middle school ===
- Pierce County Middle School

=== Elementary schools ===
- Blackshear Elementary School
- Midway Elementary School
- Patterson Elementary School
