= Georgia State Route 203 =

State highway in Georgia, United States

State Route 203
- Georgia State Route 203 highlighted in red

Route information
- Maintained by GDOT
- Length: 46.6 mi (75.0 km)
- Existed: mid-1940s–present

Major junctions
- South end: SR 15 / SR 121 in Blackshear
- SR 32 east of Alma; SR 15 southeast of Baxley
- North end: US 84 / SR 38 southwest of Jesup

Location
- Country: United States
- State: Georgia
- Counties: Pierce, Bacon, Appling, Wayne

Highway system
- Georgia State Highway System; Interstate; US; State; Special
← SR 202	→ SR 204

State Route 203 (SR 203) is a 46.7-mile-long (75.2 km) Arc shaped state highway in the southeastern part of the U.S. state of Georgia. Its routing is within portions of Pierce, Bacon, Appling, and Wayne counties. Its southern terminus is in Blackshear. It heads northwest to a point east of Alma and curves to the east to a point southwest of Jesup.

== Route description ==
SR 203 begins at an intersection with SR 15/SR 121 in Blackshear, in Pierce County. The route heads northwest through rural areas until it enters Bacon County. It continues northwest until it has a very brief concurrency with SR 32, east of Alma. SR 203 curves to the east, and enters Appling County. There, it meets SR 32 and SR 121. Then, it continues to the east, entering Wayne County, to meet its northern terminus, an intersection with US 84/SR 38, southwest of Jesup.

SR 203 is not part of the National Highway System, a system of roadways important to the nation's economy, defense, and mobility.

== Major intersections ==
County	Location	mi	km	Destinations	Notes
Pierce	Blackshear	0.0	0.0	SR 15 / SR 121 (Gordon Street) – Hoboken	Southern terminus
Pierce		6.3	10.1	Alabaha River	
Bacon		19.3	31.1	SR 32 east – Patterson	Southern end of SR 32 concurrency
Bacon		19.4	31.2	SR 32 west – Alma	Northern end of SR 32 concurrency
Appling		29.9	48.1	SR 15 (Blackshear Highway) – Blackshear, Baxley	
Appling		31.1	50.1	SR 121 south – Blackshear	Southern end of SR 121 concurrency
Appling		31.4	50.5	SR 121 north (Still Street) – Surrency	Northern end of SR 121 concurrency
Wayne		46.6	75.0	US 84 / SR 38 (South 1st Street/Waycross Highway)	Northern terminus
1.000 mi = 1.609 km; 1.000 km = 0.621 mi: Concurrency terminus
