= Pierce County, Georgia =

County in Georgia, United States

- County
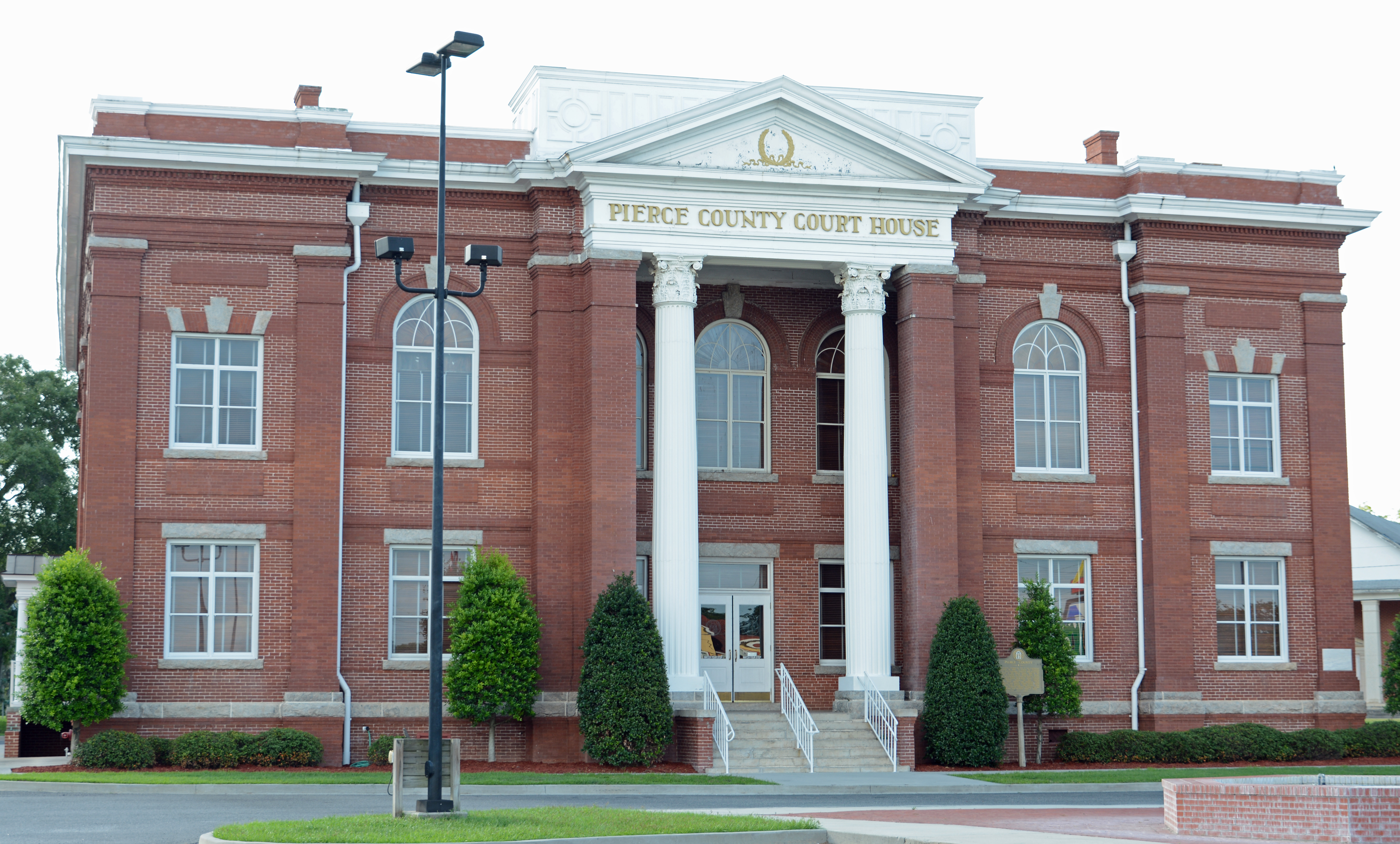
- Pierce County Courthouse in Blackshear

- Location within the U.S. state of Georgia
- Coordinates: 31°22′N 82°13′W
- Country: United States
- State: Georgia
- Founded: December 18, 1857; 168 years ago
- Named for: Franklin Pierce
- Seat: Blackshear
- Largest city: Blackshear

Area
  - Total: 343 sq mi (890 km^{2})
  - Land: 316 sq mi (820 km^{2})
  - Water: 27 sq mi (70 km^{2}) 7.8%

Population (2020)
  - Total: 19,716
  - Estimate (2025): 20,764 ▲
  - Density: 62.4/sq mi (24.1/km^{2})
- Time zone: UTC−5 (Eastern)
  - Summer (DST): UTC−4 (EDT)
- Congressional district: 1st
- Website: piercecountyga.gov

Pierce County is a county located in the southeastern part of the U.S. state of Georgia. As of the 2020 census, the population was 19,716. The county seat is Blackshear. Pierce County is part of the Waycross, Georgia Micropolitan Statistical Area.

== History ==
Pierce County is named for Franklin Pierce, fourteenth president of the United States. It was created December 18, 1857, from Appling and Ware counties.

== Geography ==
According to the U.S. Census Bureau, the county has a total area of 343 square miles (890 km^{2}), of which 316 square miles (820 km^{2}) is land and 27 square miles (70 km^{2}) (7.8%) is water.

The northeastern third of Pierce County, bordered by a line from just west of Mershon to just south of Bristol, then south to just north of Blackshear, and then heading due east, is located in the Little Satilla River sub-basin of the St. Marys River-Satilla River basin. The southern two-thirds of the county is located in the Satilla River sub-basin of the St. Marys-Satilla River basin.

=== Major highways ===
- U.S. Highway 84 / State Route 38
- State Route 15 / State Route 121
- State Route 32
- State Route 203

=== Adjacent counties ===
- Appling County - north
- Wayne County - northeast
- Brantley County - southeast
- Ware County - west
- Bacon County - northwest

== Communities ==
=== Cities ===
- Blackshear
- Offerman
- Patterson

=== Census-designated places ===
- Bristol
- Mershon

=== Unincorporated communities ===
- Otter Creek
- Walkerville

== Demographics ==
Historical population
Census	Pop.	Note	%±
1860	1,973		—
1870	2,778		40.8%
1880	4,538		63.4%
1890	6,379		40.6%
1900	8,100		27.0%
1910	10,749		32.7%
1920	11,934		11.0%
1930	12,522		4.9%
1940	11,800		−5.8%
1950	11,112		−5.8%
1960	9,678		−12.9%
1970	9,281		−4.1%
1980	11,897		28.2%
1990	13,328		12.0%
2000	15,636		17.3%
2010	18,758		20.0%
2020	19,716		5.1%
2025 (est.)	20,764	▲	5.3%
U.S. Decennial Census; 1790-1880 1890-1910; 1920-1930 1930-1940; 1940-1950 1960-1980; 1980-2000 2010

=== Racial and ethnic composition ===
Pierce County, Georgia – Racial and ethnic composition Note: the US Census treats Hispanic/Latino as an ethnic category. This table excludes Latinos from the racial categories and assigns them to a separate category. Hispanics/Latinos may be of any race.
Race / Ethnicity (NH = Non-Hispanic)	Pop 1980	Pop 1990	Pop 2000	Pop 2010	Pop 2020	% 1980	% 1990	% 2000	% 2010	% 2020
White alone (NH)	10,133	11,628	13,425	15,860	16,403	85.17%	87.24%	85.86%	84.55%	83.20%
Black or African American alone (NH)	1,618	1,566	1,691	1,646	1,597	13.60%	11.75%	10.81%	8.77%	8.10%
Native American or Alaska Native alone (NH)	8	20	34	70	41	0.07%	0.15%	0.22%	0.37%	0.21%
Asian alone (NH)	9	10	25	58	82	0.08%	0.08%	0.16%	0.31%	0.42%
Native Hawaiian or Pacific Islander alone (NH)	x	x	8	12	0	x	x	0.05%	0.06%	0.00%
Other race alone (NH)	1	0	5	10	45	0.01%	0.00%	0.03%	0.05%	0.23%
Mixed race or Multiracial (NH)	x	x	91	215	550	x	x	0.58%	1.15%	2.79%
Hispanic or Latino (any race)	128	104	357	887	998	1.08%	0.78%	2.28%	4.73%	5.06%
Total	11,897	13,328	15,636	18,758	19,716	100.00%	100.00%	100.00%	100.00%	100.00%

=== 2020 census ===
As of the 2020 census, the county had a population of 19,716, 7,506 households, and 5,319 families residing in the county.

The median age was 40.5 years, 24.4% of residents were under the age of 18, and 18.0% were 65 years of age or older; for every 100 females there were 96.3 males and 93.5 males age 18 and over. 1.3% of residents lived in urban areas, while 98.7% lived in rural areas.

The racial makeup of the county was 84.5% White, 8.1% Black or African American, 0.4% American Indian and Alaska Native, 0.4% Asian, 0.0% Native Hawaiian and Pacific Islander, 2.8% from some other race, and 3.7% from two or more races; Hispanic or Latino residents of any race comprised 5.1% of the population.

Of those households, 34.2% had children under the age of 18 living with them and 25.9% had a female householder with no spouse or partner present; about 24.1% of all households were made up of individuals and 11.8% had someone living alone who was 65 years of age or older.

There were 8,360 housing units, of which 10.2% were vacant. Among occupied housing units, 75.6% were owner-occupied and 24.4% were renter-occupied; the homeowner vacancy rate was 1.7% and the rental vacancy rate was 8.4%.

== Media ==
- The Blackshear Times (weekly newspaper)
- The Pierce County Press (weekly newspaper)
- Waycross Journal-Herald (daily newspaper)
- WKUB 105.1FM (Country radio)
- WWUF 97.7FM (Oldies radio)
- WSFN AM 1350 (Sports radio)
- WAYX AM 1230 (News Talk radio)

== Politics ==
As of the 2020s, Pierce County is a Republican stronghold, voting 88.67% for Donald Trump in 2024. For elections to the United States House of Representatives, Pierce County is part of Georgia's 1st congressional district, currently represented by Buddy Carter. For elections to the Georgia State Senate, Pierce County is part of District 8. For elections to the Georgia House of Representatives, Pierce County is part of District 178.

United States presidential election results for Pierce County, Georgia
Year	Republican		Democratic		Third party(ies)	
Year	No.	%	No.	%	No.	%
1912	63	10.96%	408	70.96%	104	18.09%
1916	85	14.19%	489	81.64%	25	4.17%
1920	122	23.06%	407	76.94%	0	0.00%
1924	83	16.57%	397	79.24%	21	4.19%
1928	285	35.27%	523	64.73%	0	0.00%
1932	29	2.57%	1,094	96.90%	6	0.53%
1936	45	2.91%	1,494	96.45%	10	0.65%
1940	84	8.16%	943	91.55%	3	0.29%
1944	165	13.37%	1,069	86.63%	0	0.00%
1948	108	7.13%	908	59.97%	498	32.89%
1952	592	23.73%	1,903	76.27%	0	0.00%
1956	298	14.44%	1,766	85.56%	0	0.00%
1960	544	27.30%	1,449	72.70%	0	0.00%
1964	1,981	66.86%	982	33.14%	0	0.00%
1968	579	17.93%	507	15.70%	2,144	66.38%
1972	1,982	88.05%	269	11.95%	0	0.00%
1976	544	17.15%	2,628	82.85%	0	0.00%
1980	1,027	34.41%	1,918	64.25%	40	1.34%
1984	1,978	56.86%	1,501	43.14%	0	0.00%
1988	1,947	55.49%	1,558	44.40%	4	0.11%
1992	1,899	42.46%	1,852	41.41%	721	16.12%
1996	2,319	56.73%	1,420	34.74%	349	8.54%
2000	3,348	71.52%	1,300	27.77%	33	0.70%
2004	4,680	78.99%	1,234	20.83%	11	0.19%
2008	5,500	80.92%	1,253	18.43%	44	0.65%
2012	5,667	82.67%	1,124	16.40%	64	0.93%
2016	6,302	86.20%	903	12.35%	106	1.45%
2020	7,898	87.29%	1,100	12.16%	50	0.55%
2024	8,655	88.67%	1,089	11.16%	17	0.17%

United States Senate election results for Pierce County, Georgia2
Year	Republican		Democratic		Third party(ies)	
Year	No.	%	No.	%	No.	%
2020	7,810	87.35%	1,002	11.21%	129	1.44%
2020	6,972	87.94%	956	12.06%	0	0.00%

United States Senate election results for Pierce County, Georgia3
Year	Republican		Democratic		Third party(ies)	
Year	No.	%	No.	%	No.	%
2020	4,034	45.91%	478	5.44%	4,274	48.65%
2020	6,980	88.05%	947	11.95%	0	0.00%
2022	6,325	88.25%	779	10.87%	63	0.88%
2022	5,929	88.49%	771	11.51%	0	0.00%

Georgia Gubernatorial election results for Pierce County
Year	Republican		Democratic		Third party(ies)	
Year	No.	%	No.	%	No.	%
2022	6,462	90.04%	674	9.39%	41	0.57%

== Education ==
The Pierce County School District has five schools, including the Pierce County High School.

== See also ==
- National Register of Historic Places listings in Pierce County, Georgia
- List of counties in Georgia
