= Blackshear Prison =

Short-lived POW camp in Blackshear, GA, US

Blackshear Prison was a temporary prisoner of war camp located in Blackshear, Georgia, during the American Civil War.

During Union Maj. Gen. William T. Sherman's 1864 "March to the Sea", Confederate officials hastily made plans to evacuate a number of existing POW camps and relocate their occupants further from the Federal army. As Blackshear is deep in southeast Georgia in a pine forest, it was thought to be a safe place for this relocation. The new prison was simply an open camp in a remote place, surrounded by a guardline, including some heavy artillery pieces. During the month of November 1864, some 5,000 Union soldiers began arriving at Blackshear. The first shipment of 600 prisoners arrived by the Atlantic and Gulf Railroad on November 16 from Savannah. Within a few weeks, the population had swelled to nearly 5,000.

As Sherman approached the coastline, most of the prisoners were further evacuated to Charleston, South Carolina and other places. By December, the "corral" at Blackshear was empty of Union prisoners. Approximately 27 Union soldiers were buried in Blackshear until the conclusion of the war, when they were reinterred at Beaufort National Cemetery, Beaufort, South Carolina. Their names are unknown.

== See also ==
- American Civil War prison camps
- Pierce County Jail
