= WSGT =

- Patterson, Georgia; United States
- Broadcast area: Waycross, Georgia; Jesup, Georgia
- Frequency: 107.1 MHz
- Branding: Kool 107.1

Programming
- Format: Classic hits

Ownership
- Owner: Broadcast South; (Higgs Multimedia Group, LLC)
- Sister stations: WKUB; WWUF

History
- First air date: 2012

Technical information
- Licensing authority: FCC
- Facility ID: 170483
- Class: A
- ERP: 6,000 watts
- HAAT: 100 meters (330 ft)
- Transmitter coordinates: 31°23′7.0″N 82°7′27.0″W

Links
- Public license information: Public file; LMS

WSGT (107.1 MHz) is a Classic Hits formatted broadcast radio station licensed to Patterson, Georgia, serving Waycross and Jesup in Georgia. WSGT is owned and operated by John Higgs' Broadcast South, through licensee Higgs Multimedia Group, LLC.
