= Blackshear Elementary School =

Blackshear Elementary School may refer to:

- Blackshear Elementary School - Blackshear, Georgia - Pierce County Schools
- Blackshear Elementary School - Austin, Texas - Austin Independent School District
- Blackshear Elementary School - Houston, Texas - Houston Independent School District
- Blackshear Elementary School - Harris County, Texas - Klein Independent School District
