= Michael Lington =

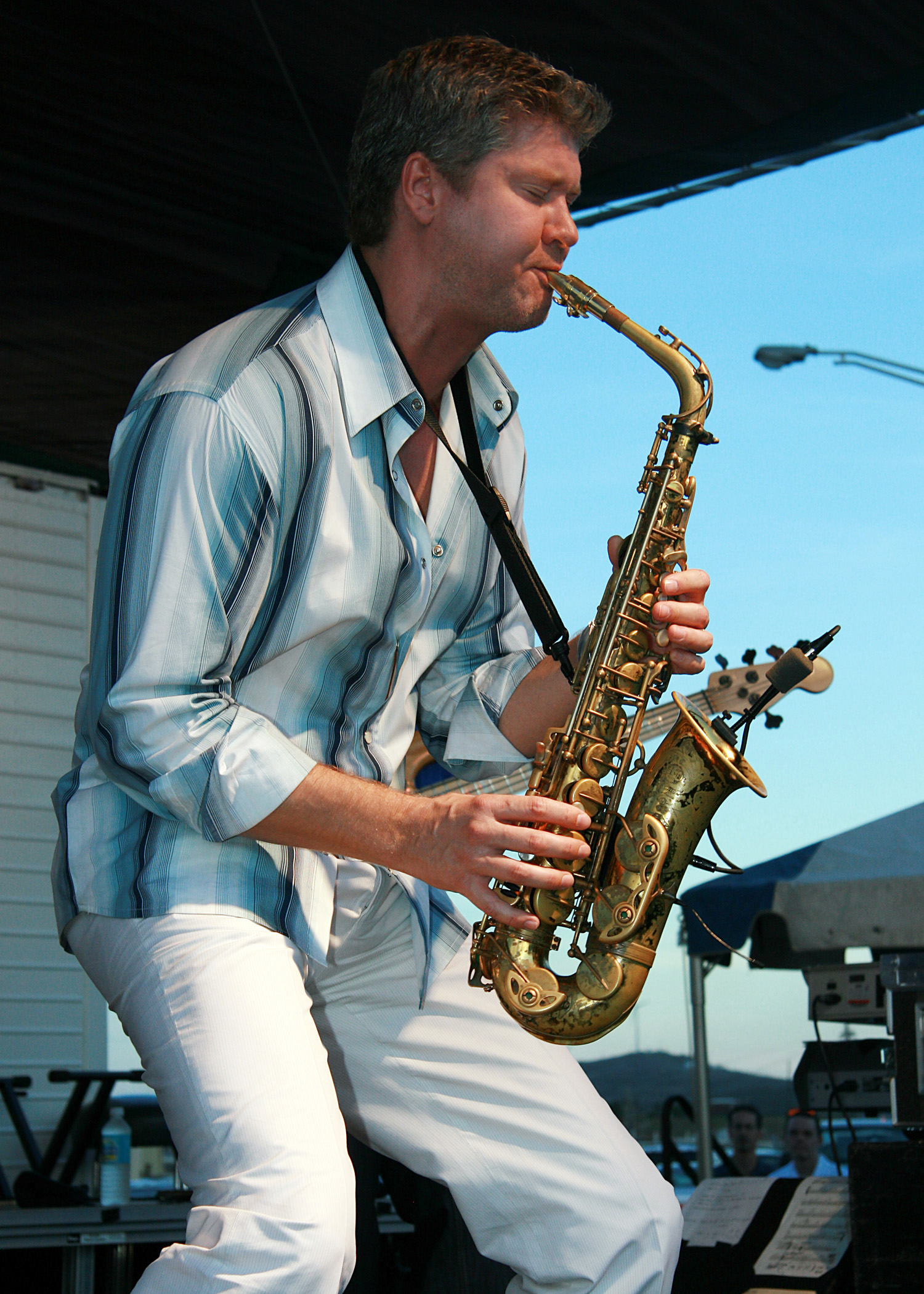
- Michael Lington at 2007 Guantanamo Bay Jazzfest

Background information
- Born: June 11, 1969 (age 57); Copenhagen, Denmark
- Genres: Jazz, soul
- Occupations: Musician, entrepreneur
- Instrument: Saxophone
- Years active: 1997–present
- Labels: Copenhagen Music, Sony/Red, Rendezvous, Gold Circle
- Spouse: Keri Murphy (m. 2021)
- Website: michaellington.com

Michael Lington (born June 11, 1969) is a Danish / American contemporary saxophonist, songwriter, producer, recording artist and a purveyor of soul and contemporary jazz.

Lington has released 14 solo albums and has 34 singles that have charted on the Billboard and Radio & Records (R&R) contemporary jazz radio charts. In 2024 Lington's radio single, South Bay, became the longest-running No. 1 song in the history of the Billboard Smooth Jazz Airplay chart holding its #1 position for seven weeks

Lington has collaborated with Michael Bolton, Barry Manilow, Aaron Neville, Mike Love, Randy Crawford, Bobby Caldwell, Kenny Lattimore, Peabo Bryson, Joan Sebastian, Cristian Castro, Booker T. Jones, Regina Belle, Ray Parker Jr., Taylor Dayne, Marcus Miller, William Bell, Dave Stewart, Vince Gill, Bebe Winans, and many others.

Lington performed at the Royal Wedding of Denmark's future king, Crown Prince Frederik and Crown Princess Mary Donaldson at Fredensborg Castle and has also played numerous other times for the Danish royal family. He is the grandson of Danish composer and band leader Otto Lington.

== Early life ==
Lington was born and raised in Copenhagen, Denmark, where he began his career at the age of seven as a clarinetist. He was a member of the Tivoli Boys Guard for seven years (1978–1985), which is where he began his formal music education, receiving a gold medal for his efforts. At 15, he became influenced by saxophonists David Sanborn and King Curtis and by American soul music artists like Sam Cooke, Wilson Pickett and Ray Charles, which precipitated his decision to take on the saxophone as an instrument of choice.

After attending college, Lington co-owned a recording studio with songwriter John Hatting while touring regularly throughout Europe. During this time, he performed on several of Denmark's Eurovision song contest entries. He also competed in the Danish newspaper Berlingske Tidene / Rhythmic Conservatory music youth competition, judged by musician Nils-Henning Ørsted Pedersen, where he won First Prize in 1987 and won the Gold Prize in 1988.

In 1990 (at age 21), Lington moved to Los Angeles with the assistance of drummer Mark Schulman and soon became heavily involved in LA's contemporary jazz scene. After playing various gigs around Southern California, he met Bobby Caldwell, with whom he toured for four years (1994–1998) and, subsequently, Randy Crawford, with whom he toured for three years (1998–2001).

== Solo career ==
Lington signed his first recording contract in 1996 with Nugroove Records and released his self-titled debut album in 1997. It produced the hit "Tell It Like It Is" (feat. Bobby Caldwell), a song that became a Top 10 Radio & Records (R&R) NAC/Smooth jazz song and a Top 20 R&R Adult Contemporary song.

In 2000, Lington signed with Gold Circle Records and released his 2nd album, Vivid, which produced two R&R charting singles, "Twice In A Lifetime" (#2) and "Sunset (Por Do Sol)" (#4). The album featured Randy Crawford singing the Burt Bacharach/Hal David classic, "Message to Michael."

In 2004, Lington signed with Rendezvous Music and released the albums Stay With Me (2004) [feat. Michael Sembello] and A Song For You (2006) (the latter of which featured a full orchestra arranged and co-produced by Randy Waldman). Stay With Me produced three Top 5 R&R charting radio singles; "Show Me" (#2), "Two Of A Kind"(#2), and "Pacifica" (#6). A Song For You also featured the notable single, "It's Too Late," penned by songwriter Carole King.

In 2008, Lington re-signed with Nugroove Records and released the album Heat, which reached the Top 5 on Billboard's Contemporary Jazz albums sales chart and was chosen as Jazztrax's 2008 Album of the Year. The album featured singers Aaron Neville and "American Idol" finalist Ace Young. It also featured Brazilian guitarist Torcuado Mariano, and the Academy Award-nominated songwriting team of Allan Rich and Jud Friedman. It was produced, in part, by Keith Olsen and Greg Phillinganes. Heat's lead single, "You and I," reached #2 on R&R's Smooth Jazz radio chart. Lington's duet with Neville, "That's When You Save Me", tied that year as JazzTrax Best Vocal Song of the Year.

In 2012, Lington released Pure on Trippin ‘N’ Rhythm Records, which featured guest artists Michael Bolton, Jonathan Butler, Lee Ritenour, Jeff Golub, and former American Idol and Tonight Show bandleader Rickey Minor. It produced the Billboard Top 5 radio single "Road Trip," which also hit #1 on the instrumental radio chart.

== Copenhagen Music ==
In 2014, Lington established his own label, Copenhagen Music, along with business partner Roy McClurg, on which he's since released the albums Soul Appeal (2014) and Second Nature (2016). Soul Appeal featured vocalists Kenny Lattimore and Ryan Shaw and produced 4 Billboard jazz radio singles; "Soul Appeal," "Uptown Groove," "In The Pocket" and "Taking Off." The self-titled first single becoming the #1 song of 2014 on the Groove Jazz music chart.

Lington released Second Nature in April 2016. The album has been described as an "audio love letter to the city and sound of Memphis," a place that the artist has said influenced him significantly as a young man. Special guests on the album include vocalists Taylor Dayne and Sy Smith, as well as Booker T. Jones, Ray Parker Jr., Paul Jackson Jr., and Brian Culbertson. Second Nature debuted at #3 on the Billboard Contemporary Jazz sales chart and #7 on the Billboard Combined Jazz sales chart. The album's first two radio singles, "Beale Street" and " Memphis Strut," were both Top 15 Billboard jazz radio singles... and the third single, "Midnight Drive," reached number one on multiple charts including The Radio Wave and Groove Jazz Music Chart.

== A Foreign Affair Christmas ==
Lington's first Christmas album, A Foreign Affair Christmas, was released on November 8, 2019, with the lead-off track being George Michael’s Last Christmas featuring French Keyboardist and Vibraphonist Philippe Saisse.

The album contains 9 traditional Christmas songs with arrangement styles that includes Jazz, Latin, Cuban, R&B and Gospel. It features an international line-up of guest artists including: Vince Gill, Philippe Saisse, Marc Antoine, Chris Standring, Dave Koz, Rick Braun, Sheléa and Russ Freeman. Musicians on the album includes: Gregg Phillinganes, Paul Jackson Jr, Luis Conte, Alex Al, Eric Valentine, David Garfield, Luis Conte, and more.

The album is produced by Michael Lington, Mixed by Paul Brown and Mastered by Bernie Grundman.

== Silver Lining ==
Lington's tenth solo album, Silver Lining, was released June 8, 2018 on Copenhagen Music. "City Life," the lead-off track and first single, was #2 Most Added at Contemporary/Smooth Jazz Radio its first week at radio. The song features Dave Stewart from the Eurythmics on guitar. The album's second single, "Deja Vu," was released to radio October 22, 2018.

The first two radio singles are two of nine songs Lington and his producer, Barry Eastmond, co-wrote for Silver Lining. In addition to Lington's alto sax and Eastmond's keyboards on all tracks, the participating musicians include Paul Jackson Jr. and Ray Parker Jr. on guitars, Freddie Washington and Alex Al sharing bass duties, Teddy Campbell on drums, Lenny Castro on percussion, and a number of other musicians appearing on other tracks – including one of the original FunkBrothers, Jack Ashford.

Stax soul legend William Bell, a 2017 Grammy-winner, sings lead on Lington's version of the Curtis Mayfield-penned "People Get Ready" and Dorian Holley handles vocals on the classic Tower of Power hit "So Very Hard to Go."

Silver Lining was recorded live at several studios, including Sunset Sound in Los Angeles and Royal Studios in Memphis.

== Touring ==
Lington has toured regularly his entire career, averaging 60-80 shows per year. From 2010 to 2013, Lington joined Michael Bolton on tour as his opening act & special guest. Lington and Bolton performed over 350 shows together in more than 40 countries. Venues on the tour included Royal Albert Hall, Sydney Opera House, Universal Amphitheatre, and the Kuwaiti Embassy in Washington, D.C. (where they performed for President Bill Clinton).

In February 2016, Barry Manilow invited Lington to join his "One Last Time" arena tour. Lington opened the show and joined Manilow on the song "Brooklyn Blues" during the headliner's main set. In April 2018, it was announced that Michael Lington will join Barry Manilow once again as his opening act starting June 8 at Wolf Trap in Vienna, Virginia.

In Nov. 2016, Lington performed for the Memphis Music Hall Of Fame ceremony, honoring 2016 inductee, (Memphis saxophonist) Charles Lloyd. Stax Records soul singer William Bell and Snoop Dogg also performed at the induction ceremony.

In December 2019, Lington joined the Dave Koz and Friends; Gifts Of The Season Christmas tour alongside Koz, Jonathan Butler, Melissa Manchester and Chris Walker. The tour traveled across the U.S. between November 29 and December 23, 2019.

Lington was nominated for International Instrumentalist of the Year at the 2009 Canadian Smooth Jazz Awards.

Lington is signed to Reliant Talent Agency for worldwide representation and has a publishing administration deal with Kobalt Music Publishing. He is an ASCAP songwriter/publisher and a 25-year voting member of the Recording Academy (NARAS). He is a Yamaha Saxophone and Vandoren reeds performing artist.

== Personal life ==
Lington lives in Southern California and is married to Keri Murphy. They have 2 children, Landon and Lauren.

== Discography ==
- 1997: Michael Lington
- 2000: Vivid
- 2002: Everything Must Change
- 2004: Stay With Me
- 2006: A Song For You
- 2008: Heat
- 2012: Pure
- 2014: Soul Appeal
- 2016: Second Nature
- 2018: Silver Lining
- 2019: A Foreign Affair Christmas
- 2021: Alone Together - The Duets
- 2023: Looking Ahead (EP)
- 2025: On The Scene (EP)
