= Otter Creek, Georgia =

Unincorporated community in Georgia, US

Coordinates: 31°19′26″N 82°08′03″W

Otter Creek is a small unincorporated community in Pierce County, Georgia, United States, separating the cities of Patterson and Blackshear. The community has a volunteer fire department. It also has a community center, and a popular restaurant also named "Otter Creek."
