= WAYX =

- Waycross, Georgia; United States
- Broadcast area: SE Georgia
- Frequency: 1230 kHz
- Branding: FS-1

Programming
- Format: Sports
- Affiliations: Fox Sports Radio

Ownership
- Owner: Satilla Broadcast Properties, LLC

History
- First air date: 1936
- Former call signs: WWGA (2001–2009)
- Former frequencies: 1200 kHz (1936–1941)
- Call sign meaning: Waycross, with an X for cross

Technical information
- Licensing authority: FCC
- Facility ID: 129162
- Class: C
- Power: 1,000 watts
- Translator: 96.3 W242BE (Waycross)

Links
- Public license information: Public file; LMS
- Website: wayx.com

WAYX (1230 AM) is an American radio station broadcasting a sports format. WAYX serves Ware, Pierce and Brantley Counties in southeast Georgia.

WAYX went on the air in 1936, originally on 1200 kHz with 100 watts of power. Over the last 80 years it has gone through several different ownerships before landing with its current owner. The community of license is Waycross, Georgia. The station is owned by Satilla Broadcast Properties, L.L.C.

WAYX formerly aired a news-talk format with Fox Radio News, Georgia Network News and Sports, and popular conservative or political talk shows. Glenn Beck, Rush Limbaugh, Sean Hannity and Neal Boortz were featured on the station, plus business talkers Clark Howard and Dave Ramsey, and computer guru and "digital goddess" Kim Komando. Weekend jazz music programming included Legends of Jazz by Ramsey Lewis and Jazztrax by Art Good. Sports Conversations with Loran Smith and the Regionsbank SEC (Southeastern Conference) football report were carried. The station also partnered with the Waycross-Ware County Chamber of Commerce to provide local event information with its "Community Happenings" and "Community Minute" announcements which aired up to 16 times daily. Vignette programs such as America's Most Wanted, Car Show Minute, National Geographic Environment Minute, the Success Journal and Wisdom Made in America added variety to the lineup. Despite the popularity and variety of the talk programming line-up, the news-talk format on WAYX was cancelled at the end of May 2011 due to lack of listener and advertiser support, and the station began simulcasting WSIZ-FM, Fitzgerald-Douglas to provide that station's 24-7 classic rock format to the Waycross area. This was not commercially successful either, and in July 2016, the station began simulcasting WKBX-FM in Kingsland, Georgia. This broadcast included country music and Camden County High School and Jacksonville Jaguars football.

In August 2025 the station started airing FS-1 (Fox Sports Radio).
