= Pierce County High School =

Public high school in Blackshear, Georgia, United States

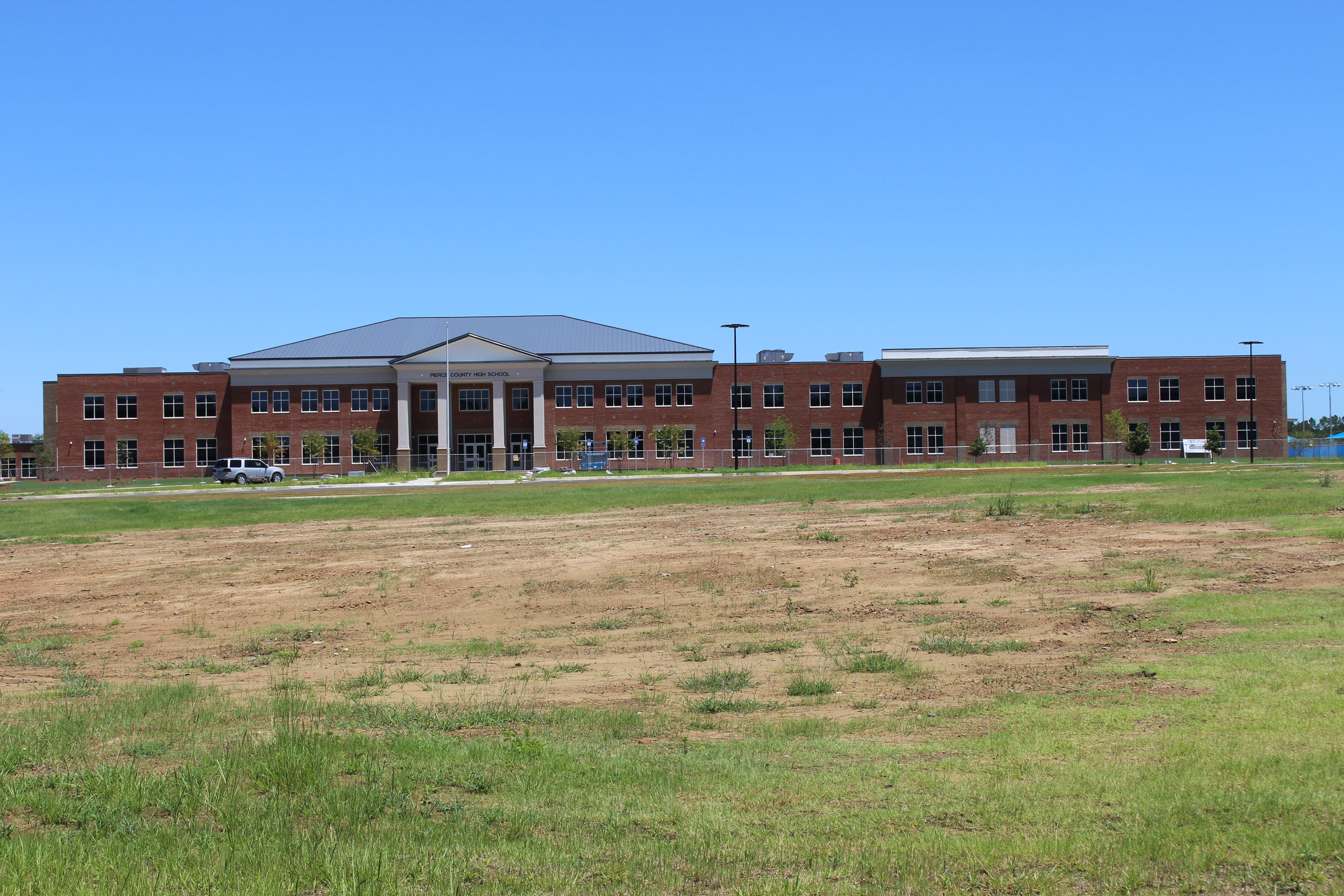

Location
- 4850 County Farm Road; Blackshear, Georgia 31516; United States; 31°20′38″N 82°13′01″W

Information
- School type: Public high school
- Motto: "Excellence is the Standard"
- School district: Pierce County School District
- Superintendent: Dara Bennett
- Principal: Kelly Murray
- Teaching staff: 63.60 (FTE)
- Grades: 9–12
- Gender: Co-educational
- Enrollment: 1,062 (2023–2024)
- Student to teacher ratio: 16.70
- Colors: Blue and silver
- Athletics conference: 1-AAA
- Sports: Baseball; Basketball; Cheerleading; Cross-Country; Football; Golf; Soccer; Tennis; Track; Volleyball
- Mascot: Bear
- Team name: Bears
- Rival: Appling County; Brantley County
- Accreditation: Southern Association of Colleges and Schools
- Yearbook: Polaris
- Website: pchs.pierce.k12.ga.us

Pierce County High School is the only public high school located in Blackshear, Georgia, United States. The school is part of the Pierce County School District, which serves Pierce County.

== History ==
Pierce County High School opened in 1981 following the merger of Blackshear High School and Patterson High School.

== Sports ==
=== State Championships ===
- Football (2020, 2023)
- Competition Cheerleading (2012, 2013, 2015, 2016, 2017, 2018, 2019, 2024, 2025, 2026)
- Boys' Golf (1988, 1989, 2009, 2017, 2026)
- Girls' Golf (2000, 2005, 2022, 2023, 2024, 2025)
- Boys' Tennis (2025, 2026)
- Girls' Tennis (2026)

=== Sports History ===
Football

The Pierce County Bears made their first title game appearance at the 2020 AAA State Championship, played at Center Parc Stadium, in which they defeated the Oconee County Warriors by a score of 13-7 in overtime. They made their second title game appearance at the 2023 AA State Championship, played at Mercedes-Benz Stadium, in which they defeated the Rockmart Yellow Jackets by a score of 48-45 in triple overtime. The head coach for both of these appearances was Ryan Herring. [4]

== Extra Curriculars ==
State Championships

- One-Act Play (1996, 2009, 2018)
- Debate (1982)

=== Sound of Silver Marching Band ===
The Pierce County Sound of Silver Marching Band won grand champion at the Royal City classic in 2007, the Blue and Gray Festival in 2009, and a nationally scored competition in Orange Park Florida in 2010. They won 32 Superior rankings for all 2014 marching band competitions. They hosted the state's largest marching competition, with 24 bands total.

=== Future Farmers of America ===
PCHS won State Forestry Field Day titles in 1982, 1983, and 1988. In 1986, Tony Waller was a member of Georgia's National Champion Forestry Team.

== Notable alumni ==
- Stetson Bennett IV – football player
- Elizabeth Cook – singer, songwriter
- Nikki DeLoach – actress, singer
- Chad Nimmer – Georgia state representative
- KaDee Strickland – actress
