= Walkersville, Georgia =

Unincorporated community in Georgia, U.S.

Coordinates: 31°23′38″N 82°16′33″W

Walkersville is an unincorporated community in Pierce County, in the U.S. state of Georgia.

== History ==
Walkersville was founded in the 1880s by Jackson Walker, and named for him. A variant name is "Walkerville". A post office called Walkersville was established in 1898, and remained in operation until 1910.
