= KaDee Strickland =

American actress (born 1975)

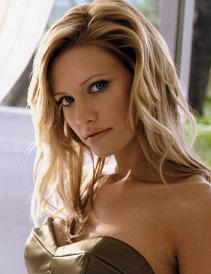
- Strickland in April 2005
- Born: Katherine Dee Strickland; December 14, 1975 (age 50); Blackshear, Georgia, U.S.
- Education: University of the Arts
- Occupation: Actress
- Years active: 1999–present
- Known for: Charlotte King on Private Practice
- Spouse: Jason Behr (m. 2006)
- Children: 1

Katherine Dee Strickland (born December 14, 1975) is an American actress. She is known for her role of Dr. Charlotte King on the ABC drama Private Practice (2007–2013).

Strickland began acting during high school. She studied acting in Philadelphia and New York City, where she obtained mostly small roles in film, television, and stage projects, among them The Sixth Sense (1999). Her participation in the 2003 Hollywood films Anything Else and Something's Gotta Give led to her receiving significant parts in the 2004 horror films Anacondas: The Hunt for the Blood Orchid and The Grudge. She was then referred to as "the pride of Patterson" and the horror genre's "newest scream queen", though her performances in both films received mixed critical reviews. In 2005, she garnered positive critical reviews for the romantic comedy Fever Pitch, and she was a regular on the television show The Wedding Bells in 2007. She was subsequently added to the cast of Private Practice.

Strickland has spoken against the emphasis placed on beauty in the Los Angeles acting community, in which she says her Southern U.S. background has helped to distinguish herself from other blonde actresses. She has spoken of an affinity for her strong female characters and a desire to avoid sexualizing or sensationalizing her self-presentation as a woman. She has also worked closely with RAINN after participating in a storyline in which her Private Practice character was sexually assaulted.

== Early life and education ==
Katherine Dee Strickland was born in Blackshear, Georgia, on December 14, 1975, to Susan, a nurse, and Dee Strickland, a high school football coach, principal, and superintendent. Her nickname comes from her parents combining the "K" in her first name with her father's name (and also her middle name) to make "KaDee". She was raised in Patterson, Georgia, which she referred to as a "one-stoplight town", and she had a job picking tobacco on a local farm for eight years. When she was a child, Strickland watched the Woody Allen film Annie Hall (1977) and was "wanting to be in that place, and being completely taken with the energy of those people [...] [she] wanted to be in it". During her childhood, she was well known locally as a member of the Strickland family and for her extracurricular activities and achievements; she was the Homecoming Queen in elementary, middle, and high school, as well as the student council president and a cheerleader. She never considered a career in the arts until her participation in a one-act play performed by students of her high school: "The minute I set foot on stage, that was it. Destiny took over. There were no other options. I felt like I fit my skin, I knew what I was here to do."

After graduating from high school, Strickland wanted to study drama at college in New York City, but her parents did not want her to live in such a large city so soon. She instead applied to the University of the Arts in Philadelphia. During her studies there, she joined the Screen Actors Guild and considered using her given name as the first part of her stage name, before deciding she was "much too tomboy" for it. She took a part-time job as a waitress at a local restaurant and interned at a casting agency, where one of her tasks was to read lines at auditions for small roles in local film and television projects; the job landed Strickland her first film role. After graduating from university with a fine arts degree, she was schooled in New York City, and she moved to Los Angeles in late 2003. In 2006, she received the University of the Arts's Silver Star Alumni Award.

== Career ==
=== Early work ===
Strickland's career began in 1999 with a brief appearance at a funeral after-party in The Sixth Sense, a two-line part that she received after impressing writer-director M. Night Shyamalan when reading lines for those auditioning for the film. According to Strickland, her role in the film helped her learn to temper her fake crying. The same year, she served as an extra in the independent film The Sterling Chase, and appeared in a small role opposite Winona Ryder and Angelina Jolie in James Mangold's drama Girl, Interrupted.

When staying in Philadelphia, Strickland had opportunities to take part in other films in production in and around the city. Those included Rel Dowdell's Train Ride, a date rape thriller filmed in 1998, but not commercially released until 2005 because of financing problems. She was also cast in the crime drama Diamond Men with Robert Forster and Donnie Wahlberg; it opened to sparkling reviews, with Richard Roeper of the Chicago Sun-Times declaring it "a fantastic film, with a good cast". After she moved to New York City, Strickland appeared in Adam Bhala Lough's filmmaking debut, Bomb the System, which received unenthusiastic notices from critics and was not shown outside film festivals until 2005.

Concurrent to her film work, Strickland acquired stage experience in productions such as A Requiem for Things Past in mid-1999, and John Patrick Shanley's Women of Manhattan. She acted in a December 2002 episode of the television show Law & Order: Criminal Intent and made nine guest appearances on All My Children, which enabled her to leave her waitressing job. In 2003, Strickland was cast opposite Eddie Cibrian in the pilot episode for an uncommissioned small screen serial adaptation of John Grisham's novel The Street Lawyer.

Strickland appeared in two romantic comedy films in 2003. Anything Else, written and directed by Woody Allen, featured her as the girlfriend of Jason Biggs's character (whom he snubs for Christina Ricci's Amanda Chase); she said it was a "dream come true" to work with Allen, of whom she is an "obsessive diehard" fan. The film was greeted with lukewarm reviews and dismal ticket sales, though Strickland later referred to it as her "big break". The second, Something's Gotta Give (starring Jack Nicholson and Diane Keaton), was a major critical and commercial success, though Strickland's part in the film was brief. She played the girlfriend of Keaton's character's ex-husband (played by Paul Michael Glaser), a relationship involving age disparity that raised the eyebrows of Keaton and her daughter (Amanda Peet). The following year, she made brief appearances in the direct-to-cable independent film Knots and the poorly received satirical comedy The Stepford Wives with Nicole Kidman, playing a partygoer and a game show contestant, respectively.

=== Major film roles ===
Strickland's first lead role came when producer Doug Belgrad saw the dailies of her scene in Something's Gotta Give. He cast her opposite Johnny Messner and Morris Chestnut in the jungle-set horror film Anacondas: The Hunt for the Blood Orchid, the sequel to Anaconda (1997). Strickland played an accomplished research scientist who travels to Borneo as part of an expedition team searching for a species of plant rumored to have life-extending properties. She said she initially did not want to follow a Woody Allen film with a "snake movie", but that she changed her mind because the hero was a female Southerner who was not "a complete idiot" or "a chick in shorts about to get whacked". Though its box office revenue tripled its production budget, Anacondas did not perform as well as its predecessor, and most reviews panned the project. The cast received positive comment from Variety magazine and the Chicago Sun-Times's Roger Ebert, but a critic for the San Diego Union-Tribune said the film was "so stupidly plotted and badly acted, it becomes unintentionally funny", and described Strickland and her co-stars' work as "garden-variety bad". Other reviews focused on the attractiveness of Strickland and her castmates; Slant Magazine said "[the film is] populated with anonymous, attractive plastic people from the Los Angeles talent pool." During the same period, The Florida Times-Union referred to her as "the pride of Patterson".

Strickland's next project, The Grudge, was another horror film. In Japanese director Takashi Shimizu's American remake of his film Ju-On: The Grudge (2003), Strickland played (in a role originated by Misaki Ito) a Tokyo-based American businesswoman whose relatives emigrate from the United States. Strickland received the role through a casting session with producer Sam Raimi, who picked her based on her work in footage for the then-unreleased Anacondas, and her willingness to work away from home for extended periods. She said that Japan and Japanese cinema had always fascinated her, and that she wanted to be "a part of that world" in which filmmakers communicate the story via action rather than dialogue; she also highlighted the importance of being "able to explore being in the wrong place at the wrong time without being a sex object/damsel in distress." The Grudge was a number-one U.S. box office hit and quickly became one of the year's most profitable films, but reviews were lukewarm. The Charlotte Observer wrote "the cast is drab and lifeless", and earned "nothing but demerits". Strickland's presence in The Grudge and Anacondas led horror fans to name her "[their] newest scream queen", but she said that when deciding what film to do next, she did not focus as much on genre as she did on good characters, scripts, and directors, which she said "don't come around that often." For the scene in which her character hides under her bed covers, Strickland received a 2005 Teen Choice Award nomination for Choice Movie Scary Scene.

In late 2004, Strickland embarked on what she called "the craziest job I've ever had": a role in the Farrelly brothers film Fever Pitch, a baseball-themed romantic comedy starring Drew Barrymore and Jimmy Fallon (Strickland's Anything Else co-star) and based on the Nick Hornby book. Strickland said it was "a blast" to play "such a maniac", particularly after playing emotionally traumatised characters in Anacondas and The Grudge. On the film's 2005 release, she received praise from PopMatters magazine, which described her as "irrepressible" in her role, and from MSNBC, which said she and JoBeth Williams "sometimes rescue [the picture] from its plodding moments". The film raised Strickland's profile further, though its critical response was mixed and it performed moderately at the box office. Strickland appeared as a lawyer and love interest in the film American Gangster, which stars Russell Crowe and Denzel Washington in 2007. In 2008, she played Jillian Cartwright in the film The Family That Preys. Since Private Practice ended its run in 2013, Strickland had starring roles in the 2019 film Grand Isle and The Time Capsule in 2022.

=== Work in television ===
In early 2005, Strickland was cast in the pilot episode for the fact-based ABC television series Laws of Chance. It was based on the career of Kelly Siegler, a highly successful Houston, Texas-based assistant district attorney. Strickland, whose co-stars in the pilot included Frances Fisher and Bruce McGill, said she was "really excited to have the opportunity to portray this phenomenal lady", but the series was dropped from development a few months later. Strickland was also cast in the independently financed 1950s-set film Walker Payne as laid-off stripminer Jason Patric's love interest; in a review of the film at the 2006 Tribeca Film Festival, Variety wrote that Strickland was "elegant". In late 2005, she joined the cast of The Flock, a crime drama featuring Richard Gere, Claire Danes and singer Avril Lavigne about a federal agent assigned to track down a missing girl and a paroled sex offender (played by Strickland). Strickland said it was important to participate in such a story because she felt members of society need to consider and be responsible for their views on the sex offender counterculture, which she says "[is] actually not counter at all, it's very real, very next door to you."

Strickland's first aired television project as a cast regular was the David E. Kelley-produced series The Wedding Bells. According to her, she wanted to be in the series because "the subject of love and commitment is something to me that I want to walk into every day. It's a lot better than dead bodies." The show began airing on the Fox Network in March 2007, and it was canceled the following month. The Baltimore Sun called it "awful in ways that make the word 'awful' seem inadequate [...] [the cast is] not a bad one at all, but just terrifically ill-served by the material." She joined the cast of the Grey's Anatomy spin-off Private Practice, which began airing in September 2007; and portrayed Charlotte King, chief of staff at the show's local hospital and a doctor specializing in urologic surgery, and later sexology. In 2015, Strickland was a main cast member in the first season of the mystery anthology television series Secrets and Lies. In 2016, she joined the series Shut Eye as Linda Haverford, the wife of lead character Charlie (played by Jeffrey Donovan). It was cancelled on January 30, 2018, after two seasons.

In 2022, she was cast in a leading role in the second season of the American teen drama thriller anthology series Cruel Summer, set for summer of 2023. Strickland will reunite onscreen with her Private Practice costars Griffin Gluck and Paul Adelstein, who played her son and husband, respectively. In 2024, she was cast as Monica Pascal in a recurring role for the thirteenth season of the American procedural drama series Chicago Fire.

=== Music video ===
In 1996, Strickland appeared briefly in the music video for Oasis's "Don't Look Back In Anger". In 2009, Strickland appeared in the music video for Rascal Flatts's "Here Comes Goodbye".

== Artistry and image ==
Strickland has cited Jessica Lange, Holly Hunter, Diane Keaton (in Annie Hall), Ione Skye (her Fever Pitch co-star) and Jane Fonda as her inspirations and/or influences; for The Grudge, she mimicked Fonda's performance in Klute (1971) and her "brilliant way in that film of creating tension and fear for the audience just by walking down a hallway and looking over her shoulder." She noted the input of her acting coach, Maggie Flanagan, who instructed Strickland to watch films with the sound turned off to gauge the quality and comprehensibility of a performance, and who Strickland credits as her "Jedi Knight".

Strickland cites her work ethic and her "active imagination" as sources of inspiration when she is required to convey certain emotions, particularly negative ones. She said she does not practise method acting, but that actors can bring to a role elements that are, in her words, "an extension of [their] life experience". According to her, she hopes to have her experience of growing up in an emotionally warm environment incorporated into her work. Strickland has spoken of her difficulty conveying different "versions" of emotions such as fear to different members of a worldwide film-watching audience, saying "what really kept me going was trying to communicate something universal." She said she is extremely flattered when people, particularly her fans, genuinely relate to her when her "version of storytelling" and work as an actress communicates to them. She said she believed she was "here" to act, and that she could not live without it: "It's my joy, it's what I love, and there's no feeling like being able to do what you love in life, and really fully doing it", she said. Strickland called her life as an actress "a crazy existence" and "completely unstable" because of the frequency with which she has to look for new jobs, but she said she is "gonna be whole hog with it" and continue to act until her death.

Strickland is a self-described "big fashionista" and "very concerned with looks", and has noted the need for "an element of vanity" in acting, particularly in Los Angeles, where she says she is "continually surrounded by super-human people" and has "never seen so much beauty". She says she has never had to rely on her appearance or felt pressured to be beautiful. With regard to sources such as magazines, Strickland said she is "very careful" about the way she wants to be presented as a woman, saying she strives to avoid "sensationalizing or sexualizing" herself. As she put it, she is not accustomed to being considered a "pretty girl" or "attractive by a standard that [she's] never felt that [she] was part of". She has a very noticeable Southern American accent, which she says is an advantage for her because it is "the one thing" that film and casting directors like the sound of and "really gravitate toward", particularly in Los Angeles, which she called "a town full of blondes". According to her, she learned to speak without the accent at university; because she does not want people to think she has no other skills, she uses it only when it is required or requested. She is experienced in stage combat and has said she "like[s] to do physical stuff". In an interview to discuss Anacondas, she said, "If there was a Braveheart for women, I'd be all over it."

== Personal life ==
Strickland met fellow actor Jason Behr on the set of The Grudge in 2004. According to her, they shared an affinity for Japanese culture and became friends almost instantly. The two began a relationship soon after filming ended. When asked about her love life in February 2005, Strickland said it was "quiet". On November 10, 2006, she married Behr in Ojai, California, in a ceremony inspired by Japanese culture. Strickland said her experience planning the wedding aided her preparation for her role in The Wedding Bells. Her work on the wedding provided the inspiration for the wedding garden of Casa de Estrellas (House of Stars), a luxury inn and spa in Santa Fe, New Mexico. Behr proposed to her on her birthday. They have a son, Atticus Elijah Behr.

In 2004, before the release of Anacondas, Strickland hosted the art debut of fellow actress Heidi Jayne Netzley at the Edgemar Center for the Arts in Santa Monica, California. She was among the actors who picketed alongside writers during the 2007–2008 Writers Guild of America strike. She also works closely with the anti-sexual assault organization RAINN. When Private Practice creator Shonda Rhimes wrote a storyline in which Strickland's character was assaulted and raped, Strickland turned to RAINN to ensure that her portrayal was true to life. Through her work for this storyline, Strickland felt a personal connection with RAINN and decided to become an advocate. Since then, she has spoken out for the elimination of the backlog of untested DNA evidence and has become a vocal advocate for using DNA evidence to solve rape cases. She also worked with Gorjana to create an exclusive piece of jewelry for RAINN, in which 80% of the sale price goes directly to the organization.

== Filmography ==
=== Film ===
Year	Film	Role	Notes
1999	The Sixth Sense	Visitor #5	Minor role
1999	The Sterling Chase	Cute Coed #1	Minor role
1999	Girl, Interrupted	Bonnie Gilcrest	
2000	Diamond Men	Monica	Theatrical release in 2001
2002	Bomb the System	Toni	Theatrical release in 2005
2003	Anything Else	Brooke	
2003	Something's Gotta Give	Kristen	
2004	Knots	Molly	Minor role; cable release in 2005
2004	The Stepford Wives	Tara	Minor role
2004	Anacondas: The Hunt for the Blood Orchid	Sam Rogers	
2004	The Grudge	Susan Williams	
2005	Train Ride	Dawn	Filmed in 1998
2005	Fever Pitch	Robin	
2006	Walker Payne	Audrey	Shown at the 2006 Tribeca Film Festival
2007	The Flock	Viola Frye	
2007	American Gangster	Richie's Attorney	
2008	The Family That Preys	Jillian Cartwright	
2019	Grand Isle	Fancy	
2022	The Time Capsule	Maggie	

=== Television ===
Year	Film	Role	Notes
2002	All My Children	Alison Waters	Guest appearance
2002	Law & Order: Criminal Intent	Sandi Tortomassi	Episode: "Shandeh"
2003	The Street Lawyer	Caroline Browne	TV movie
2007	The Wedding Bells	Annie Bell	Main cast
2007–13	Private Practice	Charlotte King	Main cast; 111 episodes
2013	Bloodline	Stella Killpriest	TV movie
2015	Secrets and Lies	Christine "Christy" Crawford	Main cast; 10 episodes
2015	The Player	Special Agent Rose Nolan	4 episodes
2016	Doubt	Sadie	Unaired pilot
2016–2017	Shut Eye	Linda Haverford	Main cast; 20 episodes
2023	Cruel Summer	Debbie Landry	Main cast (season 2)
2024–2025	Chicago Fire	Monica Pascal	Recurring role (season 13)

=== Music videos ===
Year	Title	Artist(s)
1996	"Don't Look Back in Anger"	Oasis
2009	"Here Comes Goodbye"	Rascal Flatts

=== Theatre ===
Year	Film	Role	Notes
1999	A Requiem for Things Past		
	Women of Manhattan		
