= Pierce County Jail =

Historic jail in the U.S.

- U.S. National Register of Historic Places
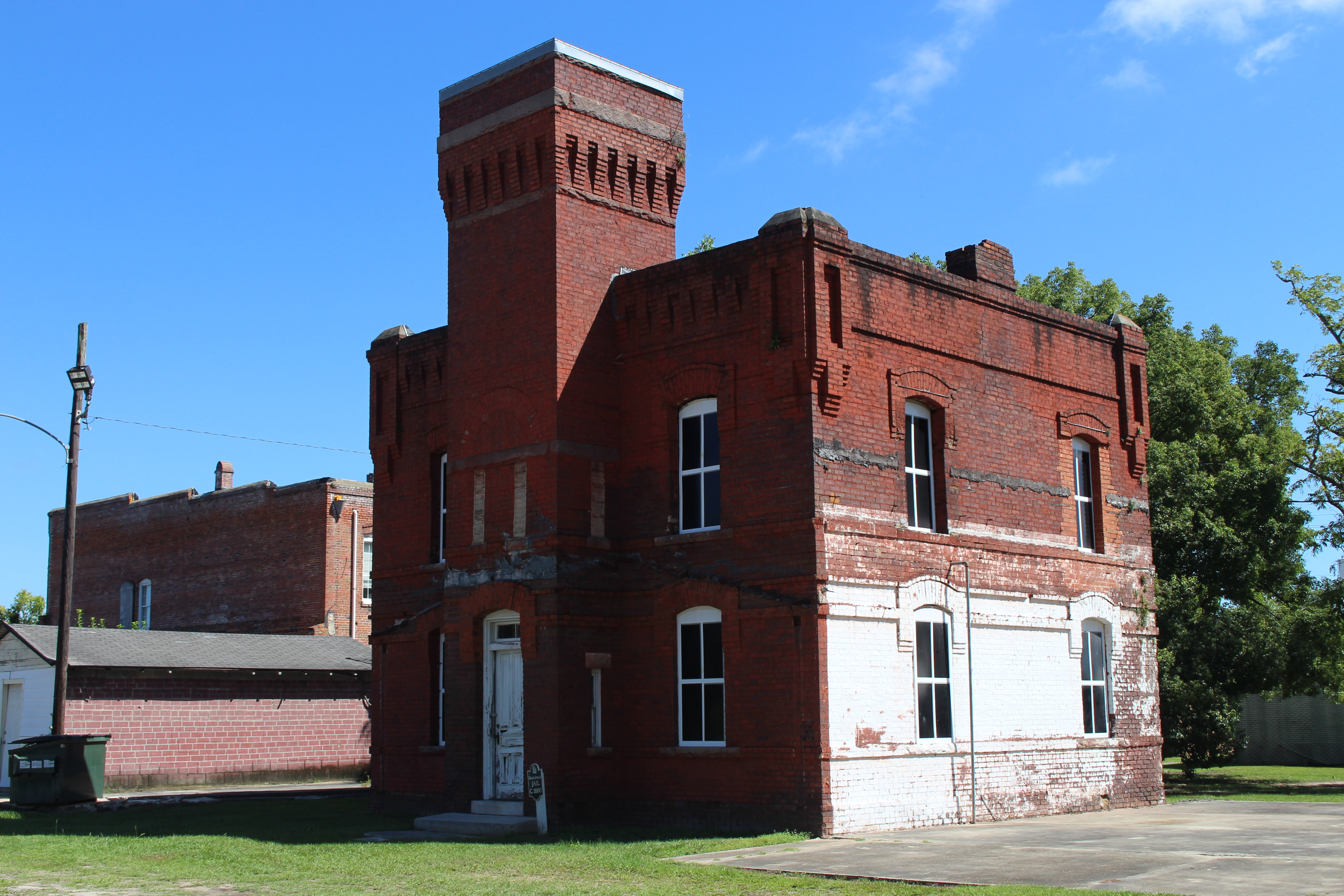

- Location within Georgia Location within the United States
- Location: Taylor St, Blackshear, Georgia
- Coordinates: 31.30300°N 82.24011°W
- Area: 18 acres (7.3 ha)
- Built: 1894
- Architect: Pauly Jail Building
- NRHP reference No.: 80001221
- Added to NRHP: May 28, 1980

The Pierce County Jail (also known as the Blackshear Jail) is a historic building built in 1894 in Blackshear, Georgia. It was added to the National Register of Historic Places on May 28, 1980.

== History ==
An old wooden jail burned in 1880 and a jail made of wood and metal was built in 1882. In 1894 a new two-story brick jail was built, with room for the jail keeper to live on the first floor. It was used as a jail from then until 1926. The building was then used as a city hall and police headquarters until 1976.

== Photos ==
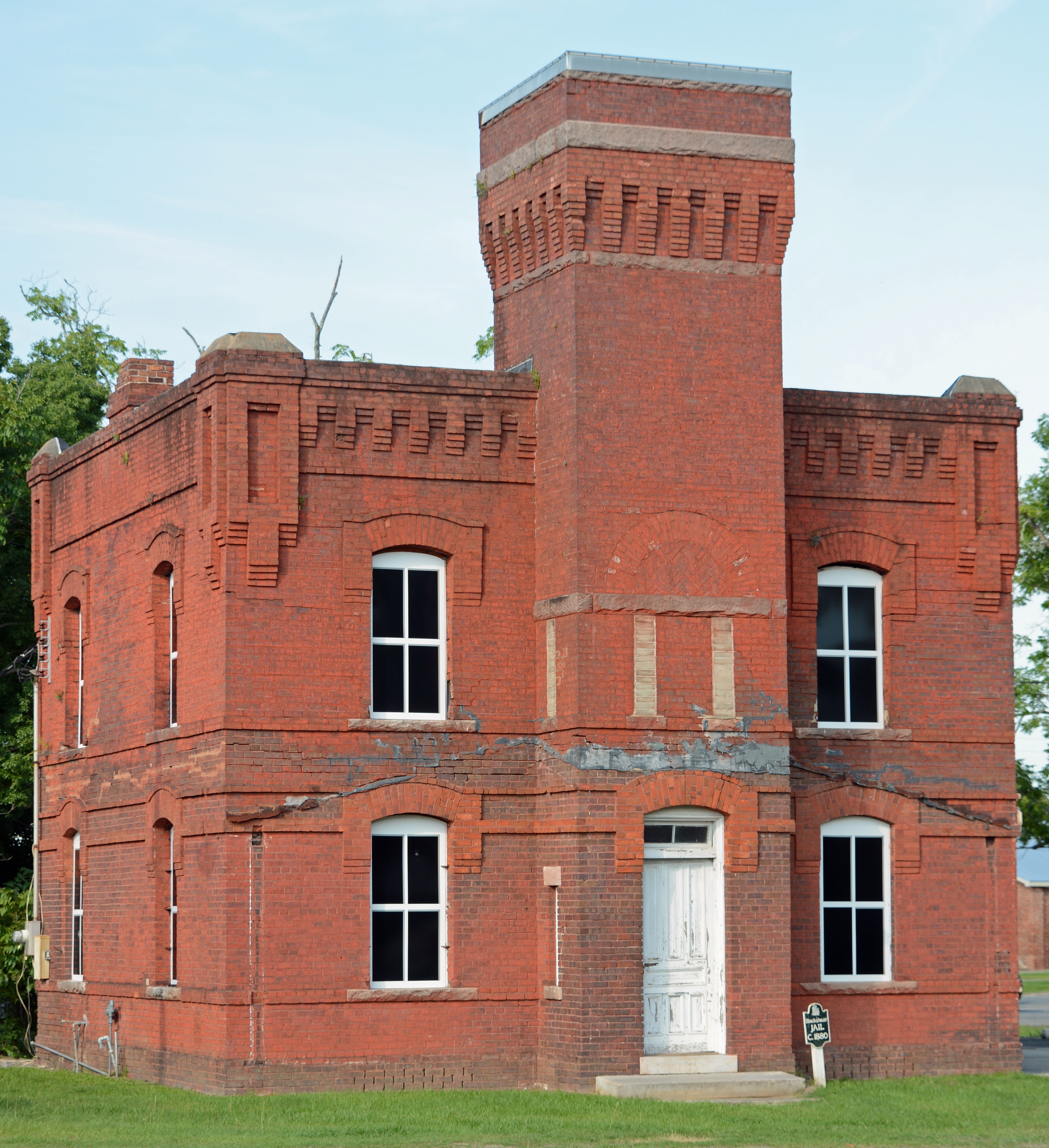
Front view

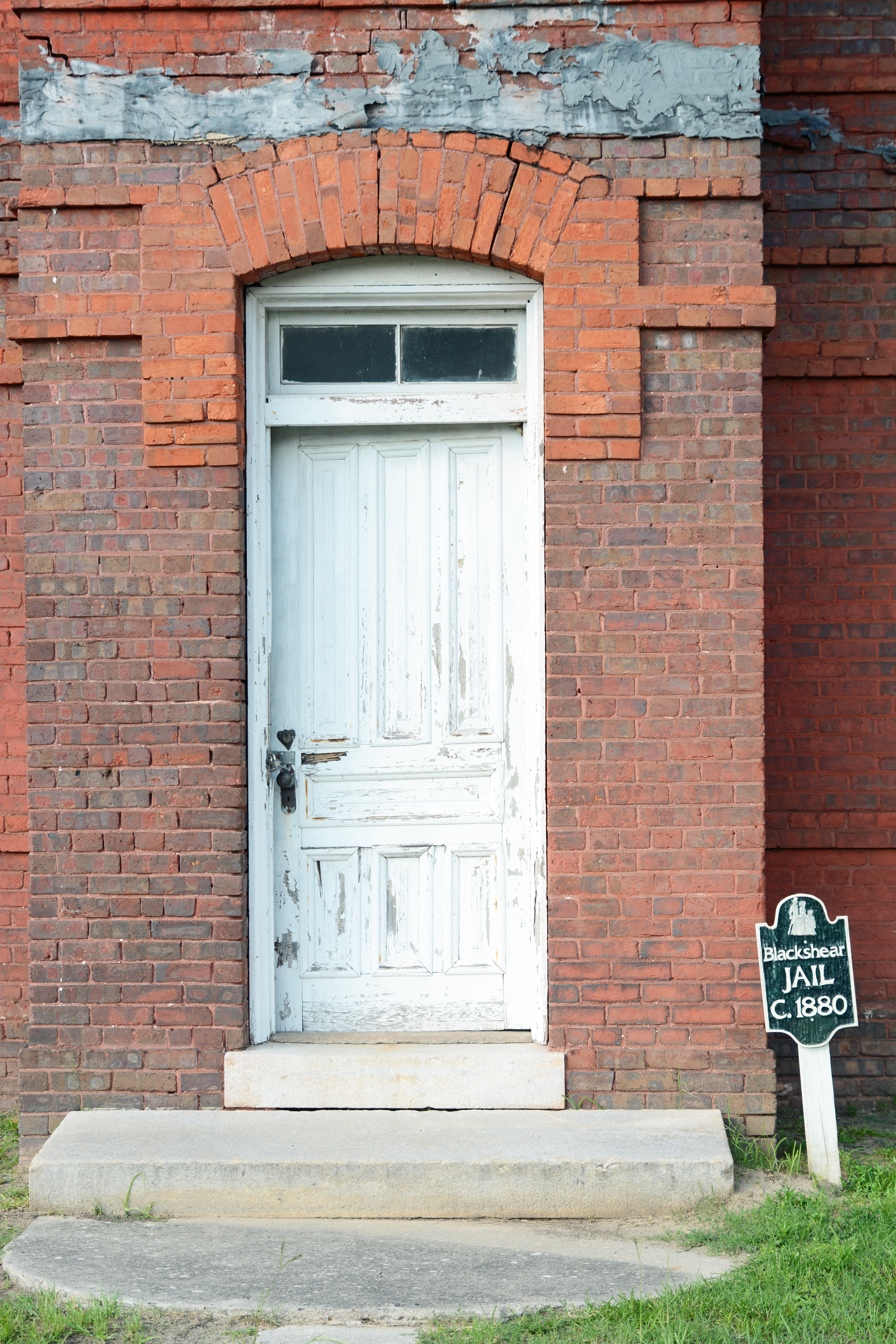
Door of the old jail

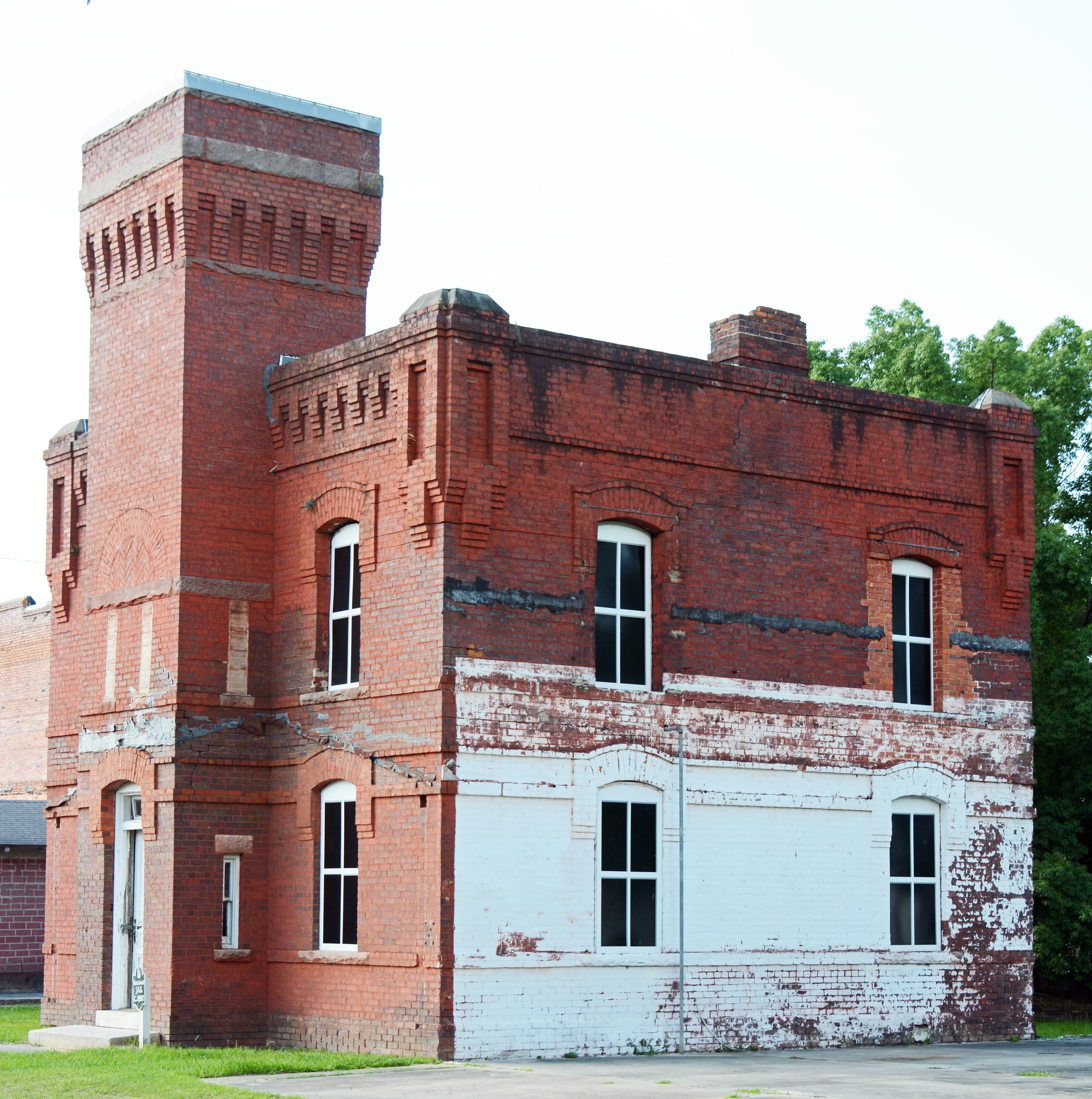
Side of the building (a one-story building once adjoined it)

== See also ==
- Blackshear Prison
