= Ella Brantley =

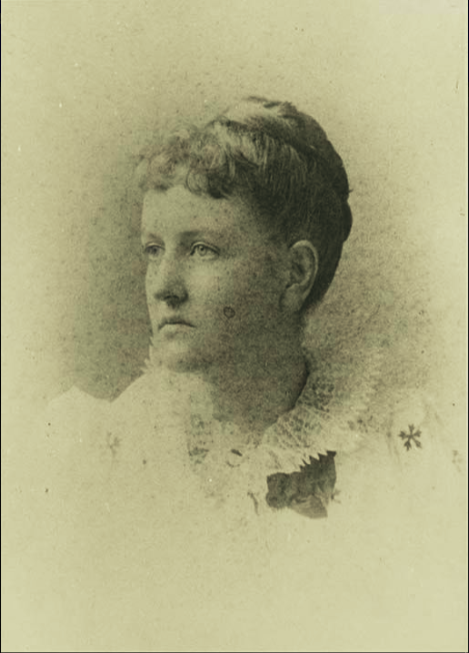
- Brantley in October 1888

President of the Georgia Federation of Women's Clubs

Personal details
- Born: Ella Thomas Foreacre; May 24, 1864; Atlanta, Georgia, U.S.
- Died: January 22, 1948; St. Augustine, Florida, U.S.
- Spouse: Archibald P. Brantley (m. 1888; died 1937)
- Children: 3
- Occupation: clubwoman; civic leader

Ella Thomas Foreacre Brantley (née Foreacre; also known as Mrs. A. P. Brantley; 1864–1948) was an American clubwoman and civic leader. She was one of the first members of the Atlanta chapter United Daughters of the Confederacy (UDC), and she served as President of the Georgia Federation of Women's Clubs (FWC).

== Early life and education ==
Ella Thomas Foreacre was born in Atlanta, Georgia, on May 24, 1864. Her parents were Col. Green Jonas (G.J.) Foreacre (died 1884 in Newark, Ohio) and Delia H. (Nichols) Foreacre (died 1917 in Charlotte, North Carolina). Col. Foreacre was one of the upbuilders of railroads in Georgia and a pioneer citizen of Atlanta, who became a resident of the city in 1850. He was a captain in the Confederate army in the seventh Georgia regiment, Company B, which was mustered into service in Atlanta. Mrs. Foreacre was one of the pioneer Reconstruction era leaders in social and church work in Atlanta.

She was educated at Mrs. Ballard's School for Girls, Atlanta. She finished her education at the Mt. Vernon Institute in Baltimore, Maryland.

== Career ==
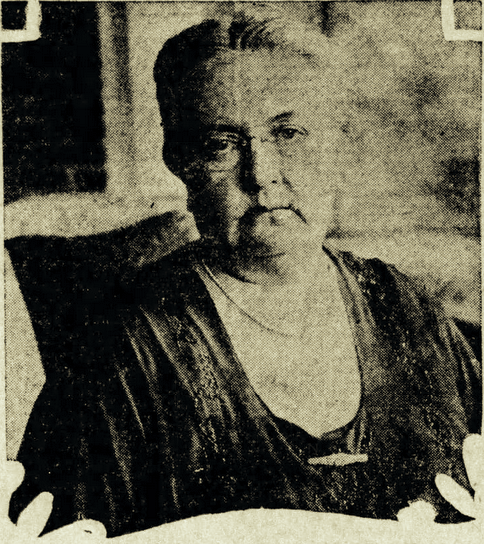
Brantley in 1923

Brantley served as 2nd Vice-President, Georgia FWC, 4 years; 1st Vice-President, Georgia FWC, 4 years; and Chair of club extension of the Georgia FWC. In 1923, she was elected President of the Georgia FWC. During her regime in the federation, she brought in 194 new clubs with an approximate total of 52,000 for state membership. this was the largest number of clubs and the greatest increase shown in club membership during a similar period at any time since the organization of the federation. In 1921, she brought in 100 clubs, a feat which had never before been accomplished in the history of the federation.

Wilson served as president of the Blackshear Woman's Club; trustee of Tallulah Falls School; member, Atlanta Historical Society; and member, History Class of 1894. It was through her father's connection in the civil war that Brantley had an interest in the work of the UDC. She was one of the first members of the Atlanta chapter UDC and her certificate was number 9 in this organization.

== Personal life ==
On October 3, 1888, in Blackshear, Georgia, she married Archibald P. Brantley. They had three children, including daughters Mrs. James Ragan and Mrs. Lawrence Willet. After becoming widowed in 1937, Brantley removed from Blackshear back to Atlanta.

In religion, she was Presbyterian. In politics, she was a Democrat.

== Death and legacy ==
Ella Brantley died in St. Augustine, Florida, on January 22, 1948.

In 1950, a memorial book shelf in the Passie Fenton Ottley Library at Tallulah Falls, Georgia was named in Brantley's honor.
