= The Time Capsule =

2022 American film by Erwann Marshall

- Theatrical release poster
- Directed by: Erwann Marshall
- Written by: Chad Fifer; Erwann Marshall
- Produced by: Amanda Marshall
- Starring: Todd Grinnell; Brianna Hildebrand; KaDee Strickland; Baron Vaughn; Ravi Patel
- Cinematography: Ed Herrera
- Edited by: Kyle Gilbertson
- Music by: René G. Boscio
- Production companies: Landier Entertainment; Dobré Films; Synapse Pictures
- Distributed by: FilmRise
- Release date: June 3, 2022
- Running time: 105 minutes
- Country: United States
- Language: English

The Time Capsule is a 2022 American science fiction romantic drama film directed by Erwann Marshall in his feature directorial debut from a screenplay co-written with Chad Fifer. It stars Todd Grinnell, Brianna Hildebrand, KaDee Strickland, Baron Vaughn, and Ravi Patel. It was released in the United States on June 3, 2022, by FilmRise.

== Plot ==
In high school, Jack's girlfriend Elise went on a space mission. Twenty years later, Jack is a married politician and Elise returns to Earth, having not aged a day due to time dilation. Jack, who still has feelings for her, faces a moral dilemma about love.

== Cast ==
- Todd Grinnell as Jack
- Brianna Hildebrand as Elise
- KaDee Strickland as Maggie
- Baron Vaughn as Patrice
- Ravi Patel as Roger

== Production ==
In December 2021, FilmRise acquired the distribution rights. The film was released in the U.S. in select theaters and on demand on June 3, 2022.

== Reception ==
On the review aggregator website Rotten Tomatoes, 33% of three reviews are positive.
