= Grand Isle (2019 film) =

- Theatrical release poster
- Directed by: Stephen Campanelli
- Written by: Iver William Jallah; Rich Ronat
- Starring: Nicolas Cage; KaDee Strickland; Luke Benward; Kelsey Grammer
- Edited by: Eric Potter
- Production companies: VMI Worldwide; Iver William Pictures; ORWO Studios; Saturn Films
- Distributed by: Screen Media Films
- Release dates: November 15, 2019 (Lone Star Film Festival); December 6, 2019 (United States)
- Running time: 97 minutes
- Country: United States
- Language: English
- Budget: $5 million
- Box office: $5,566

Grand Isle is a 2019 American action thriller film directed by Stephen Campanelli and starring Nicolas Cage. It was released in the United States on December 6, 2019.

== Plot ==
In the coastal town of Grand Isle, Louisiana, Fancy answers the door to find girl scouts selling cookies. She is very enthusiastic but also creepy.

In 1988, Walt, who has long hair and a beard and looks and acts scary, confronts a burglar, shooting him as he runs away. The burglar breaks the fence as he falls.

Buddy is covered with blood and being interrogated by Detective Jones. Occasionally, the interrogation is shown again.

In a flashback, Buddy, whose wife doesn't want sex after months with a baby, is having financial problems. When contacted by Walt, who lives in the house visited by the girl scouts, he says he can fix the fence for $200. Walt offers him $250 to fix the fence that day. Fancy, Walt's wife, flirts with him. On the news, the big stories are the approaching hurricane and several missing teenage boys.

The hurricane is approaching and Buddy can't finish his work. When his truck won't start, Fancy invites Buddy to dinner and gives him a tour of the house, which has been in her family for generations. But she won't explain the locks on the basement door. Fancy also flirts some more and says she couldn't have children but would have liked to very much.

Buddy falls asleep on the sofa but is awakened by Walt, who takes him up to the attic. They talk about their military service. Walt served as a Marine in Vietnam but went home before his entire unit was killed and he is bitter. Buddy was in the Navy and his ship was attacked, with 37 dead including his friend, who he says he tried to help. Walt shows Buddy thousands of dollars in cash and says his wife is terminally ill. He wants Buddy to kill her and gives him cyanide. Instead, when Buddy finds her in the bathtub, Fancy flirts some more which leads to sex.

Learning her husband's intentions, Fancy stabs Walt and he knocks her out. Buddy and Walt fight and when the power goes out, Buddy takes a flashlight to the basement and finds a young man hooked up to an IV, who is holding a colorful piece of cloth with Japanese writing and struggles to ask for help. Buddy goes back upstairs where he is knocked out and wakes up bloody in his truck next to a dead body, cop cars headed his way.

At the police station, Jones is finished with the interrogation. Another detective who was watching through a one-way mirror believes Buddy because of his description of the cloth the young man was holding. Shown a photo of a missing woman wearing a dress that looks like the cloth, Buddy says that is what he saw.

Using a search warrant, the police visit Walt and Fancy, and eventually find the missing woman, who was held prisoner to give them children, as well as missing teenagers. Walt gets away while the cops shoot. Lisa wants to leave Buddy because they can't make their marriage work.

On the news, the destruction caused by the hurricane is the biggest story, but Walt has been on the run for weeks.

At a restaurant, Walt shoots and everyone gets down to avoid the bullets. Buddy comes outside to see Walt holding Lisa hostage. Eventually, Walt is shot and Buddy and Lisa make up.

On the news, photos of the girl scouts are shown, as they have been found in bad shape.

== Cast ==
- Nicolas Cage as Walter, a hard-drinking Vietnam veteran who is haunted by his past.
- KaDee Strickland as Fancy, his wife, an older woman who desperately wants children and suffers from leukemia .
- Luke Benward as Buddy, a former USS Stark sailor who is currently working as a contractor.
- Kelsey Grammer as Detective Jones
- Zulay Henao as Detective Newton
- Emily Marie Palmer as Lisa
- Ziggy Elizabeth Marley as David Lizzie Roberts

== Reception ==
=== Critical response ===
On review aggregator Rotten Tomatoes, the film holds an approval rating of 9% based on 11 reviews, with an average rating of 3.8/10. On Metacritic, the film has a weighted average score of 29 out of 100, based on four critics, indicating "generally unfavorable" reviews.

Kristian Lin from Fort Worth Weekly gave a good review, praising the plot twists and the performances of Cage and Grammer. Dylan Andresen from Film Threat appreciated the film, writing that: "Generally, I enjoyed watching it, which already places it higher than most films out there. If you are a fan of Nick Cage, his acting antics, or just need a new film for the evening, then this one is most certainly worth a watch", giving it a positive rating of 6/10.

=== Awards ===
Grand Isle won the Spotlight Award at Lone Star Film Festival and received a Special Mention at Noir Film Festival.
