= Bristol, Georgia =

- Unincorporated community Census-designated place
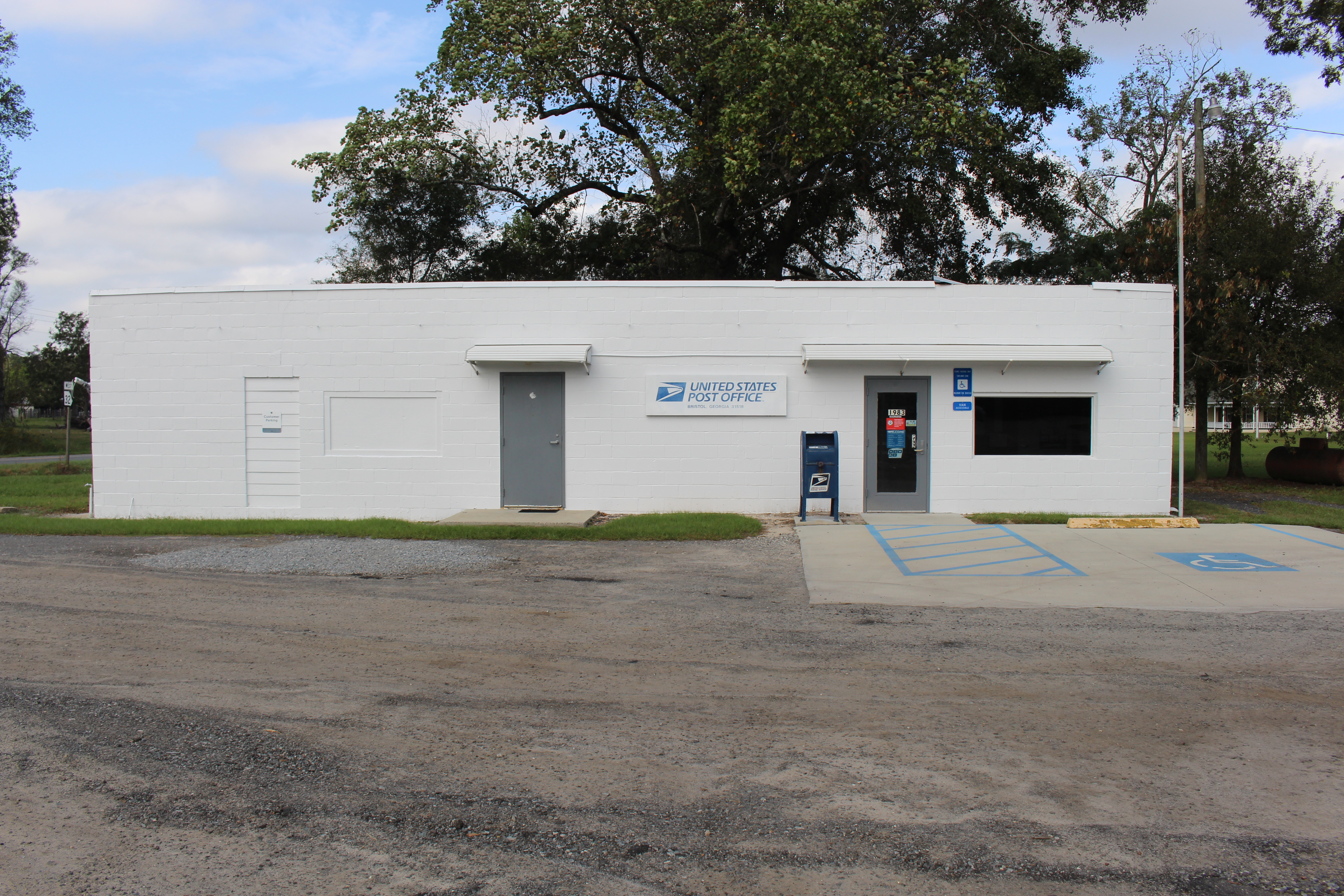
- Bristol Post office

- Location within Georgia
- Coordinates: 31°26′55″N 82°12′52″W
- Country: United States
- State: Georgia
- County: Pierce
- Elevation: 141 ft (43 m)

Population (2020)
  - Total: 122
- Time zone: UTC-5 (Eastern (EST))
  - Summer (DST): UTC-4 (EDT)
- Area code: 912
- GNIS feature ID: 354859

Bristol is an unincorporated community and census-designated place (CDP) in Pierce County, Georgia, United States. Bristol is located at the intersection of the concurrent Georgia State Route 15 and Georgia State Route 121, which runs north–south through Bristol, and Georgia State Route 32, which runs east–west. Bristol is 10 miles (16 km) north of Blackshear. Bristol is also known as Lightsey.

The 2020 census listed a population of 122.

== History ==
A variant name was "Lightsey". The Georgia General Assembly incorporated Bristol as a town in 1914. According to tradition, the present name is after Bristol, in England. Bristol's charter was dissolved in 1995.

== Demographics ==
Historical population
Census	Pop.	Note	%±
2020	122		—
U.S. Decennial Census; 1850-1870 1870-1880; 1890-1910 1920-1930; 1940 1950 1960; 1970 1980 1990; 2000 2010-2020

Bristol was first listed as a census designated place in the 2020 census.

Bristol CDP, Georgia – Racial and ethnic composition Note: the US Census treats Hispanic/Latino as an ethnic category. This table excludes Latinos from the racial categories and assigns them to a separate category. Hispanics/Latinos may be of any race.
Race / Ethnicity (NH = Non-Hispanic)	Pop 2020	% 2020
White alone (NH)	96	78.69%
Black or African American alone (NH)	14	11.48%
Native American or Alaska Native alone (NH)	0	0.00%
Asian alone (NH)	0	0.00%
Pacific Islander alone (NH)	0	0.00%
Other race alone (NH)	0	0.00%
Mixed race or Multiracial (NH)	0	0.00%
Hispanic or Latino (any race)	12	9.84%
Total	122	100.00%

In 2020, Bristol had a population of 122.
