= WKUB =

- Blackshear, Georgia; United States
- Broadcast area: Waycross, Georgia
- Frequency: 105.1 MHz
- Branding: Kub Country 105.1

Programming
- Format: Country music
- Affiliations: Fox News Radio; Real Country (Westwood One)

Ownership
- Owner: Broadcast South; (Higgs Multimedia Group, LLC)
- Sister stations: WSGT; WWUF

History
- First air date: December 10, 1979

Technical information
- Licensing authority: FCC
- Facility ID: 40704
- Class: C2
- ERP: 50,000 watts
- HAAT: 106.2 meters
- Transmitter coordinates: 31°10′54.00″N 82°22′51.00″W

Links
- Public license information: Public file; LMS

WKUB (105.1 FM) is a radio station broadcasting a gold-based country music format. Licensed to Blackshear, Georgia, United States, the station is currently owned by John Higgs' Broadcast South, through licensee Higgs Multimedia Group, LLC. It features programming from Fox News Radio and Westwood One.
