= Pierce County Courthouse (Georgia) =

- U.S. National Register of Historic Places
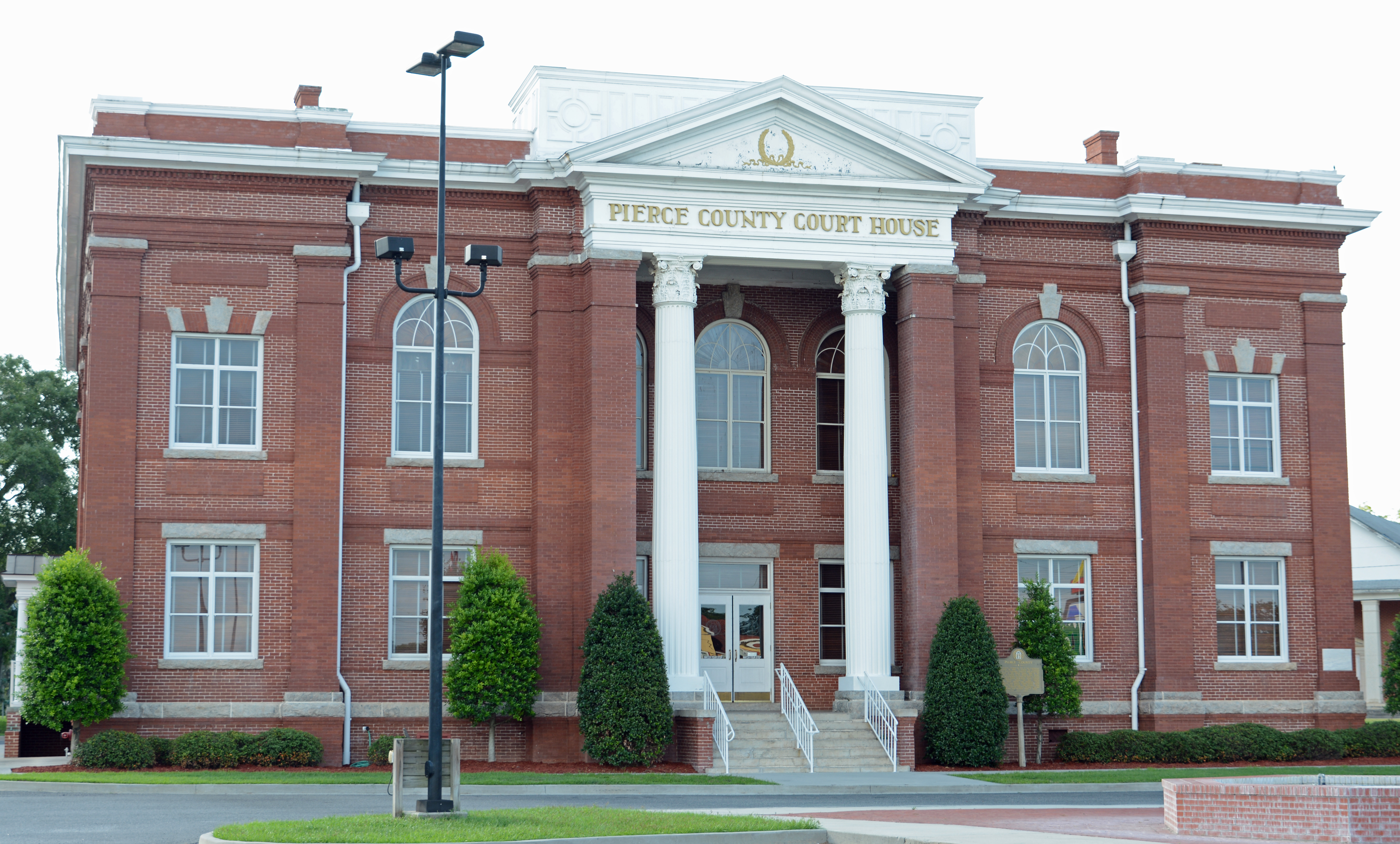

- Location within Georgia Location within the United States
- Location: Main Street, Blackshear, Georgia
- Coordinates: 31.30659°N 82.24290°W
- Area: 4 acres (1.6 ha)
- Built: 1902
- Built by: George A. Clayton
- Architect: J.W. Golucke & Co.
- Architectural style: Classical Revival
- MPS: Georgia County Courthouses TR
- NRHP reference No.: 80001220
- Added to NRHP: September 18, 1980

The Pierce County Courthouse is located in Blackshear, Georgia, on US 84. It was built in 1902 at a cost of $20,000. It is made of several shades of red brick with pink and white mortar. It has fluted columns made of metal. There is a brick addition in the rear of the building. The interior has a small rotunda. It was added to the National Register of Historic Places in 1980.
