= Baron Vaughn =

American comedian (b. 1980)

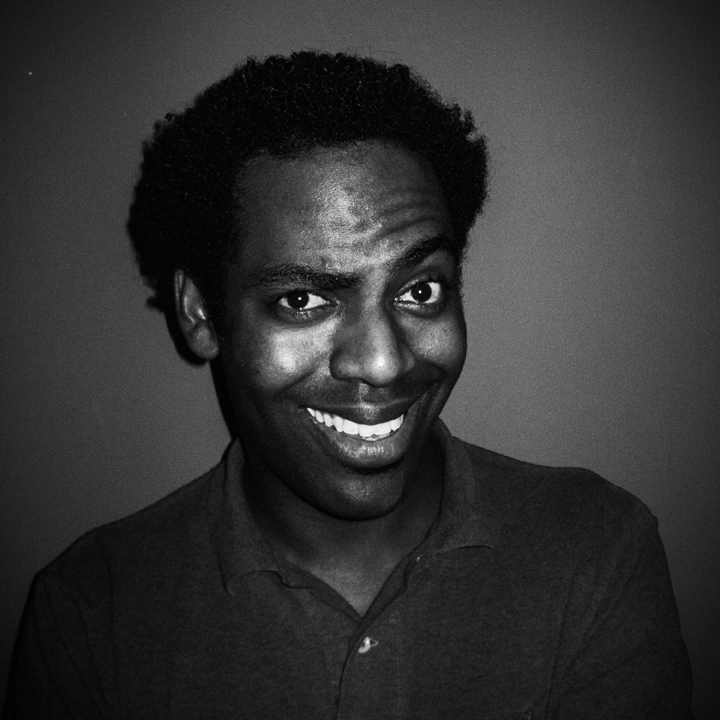
- Born: December 18, 1980 (age 45); Portales, New Mexico, U.S.
- Education: Boston University (BFA)
- Occupations: Comedian, actor
- Years active: 2006–present

Baron Vaughn (born December 18, 1980) is an American comedian and actor, known for his portrayal of Nwabudike "Bud" Bergstein on the Netflix television series Grace and Frankie and Tom Servo on the 2017 revival of Mystery Science Theater 3000. Previously, Vaughn appeared on the USA Network television series Fairly Legal, on which he played legal assistant Leonardo Prince.

== Career ==
A classically trained actor, Vaughn has appeared in Law & Order and has played supporting roles in a number of feature films, including Cloverfield and Black Dynamite. However, he is best known for his comedy work; credits include The Awkward Comedy Show with Hannibal Buress, and stand-up comedy featured on the talk shows Lopez Tonight, Conan, Late Night with Jimmy Fallon and The Late Late Show with Craig Ferguson. He has appeared on Comedy Central during Live at Gotham and Russell Simmons Presents "Live at the EL REY", has starred in various CollegeHumor videos, and has performed stand-up comedy at Collegehumor live.

Vaughn also has a philosophy podcast, Deep S##! with Baron Vaughn. In November 2014, he started another podcast with Leonard Maltin called Maltin on Movies on the Wolfpop network, sister network of Earwolf.

On November 23, 2015, Mystery Science Theater 3000 creator Joel Hodgson announced that Vaughn would provide the voice of Tom Servo in the series' revival. a role previously played by Josh Weinstein and Kevin Murphy. The first revival season was released April 14, 2017.

He provided the voice of Moon in the Disney XD series Right Now Kapow.

As of 2013, Vaughn lives in Los Angeles, California.

On October 10, 2019, he was featured in a 30-minute YouTube documentary created by SoulPancake in collaboration with Funny or Die wherein a variety of comedians discuss mental health called Laughing Matters.

== Filmography ==
=== Film ===
| Year | Title | Role | Notes |
|---|---|---|---|
| 2006 | My Brother | Reason Comic | |
| 2007 | Twisted Fortune | Jack the Counter Guy | |
| 2008 | Cloverfield | Party Goer | |
| 2009 | Black Dynamite | Jimmy | |
| 2009 | Cozy Bear | Baron | Short film |
| 2009 | Untitled Sketch Group | Baron Vaughn | Short film |
| 2010 | Ghostbusters Return | | Short film |
| 2010 | Anatomy of the Lonely | | |
| 2011 | Thugs, the Musical! | Donald Evan Lesley | Short film |
| 2012 | The Kitchen | Andre | |
| 2013 | The Assistant | Baron | Short film |
| 2014 | Jason Nash Is Married | Arthur | |
| 2015 | Life in Color | Accomplished Comic | |
| 2019 | Batman vs. Teenage Mutant Ninja Turtles | Donatello | Voice; Direct-to-video |
| 2019 | Scare Package | Varron Bonn | Segment "So Much To Do", also writer, director |
| 2022 | The Time Capsule | Patrice | |

=== Television ===
| Year | Title | Role | Notes |
|---|---|---|---|
| 2006 | Law & Order: Criminal Intent | Amos | Episode: "Siren Call" |
| 2006 | The Burg | The Photographer | Episode: "90's" |
| 2007 | The Gamekillers | Open Mike | Unknown episodes |
| 2008 | Teachers | Justin Hughes | TV movie |
| 2008–09 | Law & Order | Asst. M.E. Anskel | 2 episodes |
| 2009 | Rescue Me | Hipster #1 | Episode: "Zippo" |
| 2009 | Wake Up World | Davis Miles | TV movie |
| 2009 | Canned | Trent | TV movie |
| 2010 | The Whitest Kids U' Know | Jury Selector | Episode #4.6 |
| 2011–12 | Fairly Legal | Leonardo Prince | 23 episodes |
| 2012 | CollegeHumor Originals | Metatron | Episode: "God's Diary Is Embarrassing" |
| 2013 | Arrested Development | Hors D'oeuvre Server | Episode: "Double Crossers" |
| 2013 | Law of the Land | Umprey Nixon | Unknown episodes |
| 2013 | You're Whole | Eddie | Episode: "Attitude" |
| 2014 | Enlisted | Wallace | Episode: "Pilot" |
| 2014 | Key & Peele | Man at Bar | Episode: "Parole Officer Puppet" |
| 2014 | Dream Corp, LLC | Instructional Patient | TV short |
| 2014–16 | Comedy Bang! Bang! | Zeke | 9 episodes |
| 2015–2022 | Grace and Frankie | Nwabudike "Bud" Bergstein | Main cast |
| 2015–16 | TripTank | Thomas / Person in Line (voice) | 3 episodes |
| 2016 | Love | | Episode: "Party in the Hills" |
| 2016 | Girls | Wolfie | Episode: "Wedding Day" |
| 2016 | HelLA | Douche Bag | Episode: "Dating in LA Sucks" |
| 2016 | Hidden America with Jonah Ray | Shane | Episode: "Chicago: The Second Best City" |
| 2016 | The Meltdown with Jonah and Kumail | Himself | 1 episode |
| 2016–19 | Those Who Can't | Phil | 4 episodes |
| 2016–17 | Right Now Kapow | Moon (voice) | 26 episodes |
| 2016–18 | BoJack Horseman | Various voices | 2 episodes |
| 2017 | Michael Bolton's Big, Sexy Valentine's Day Special | Ben | TV special |
| 2017–22 | Mystery Science Theater 3000 | Tom Servo (voice) | 20 episodes |
| 2017 | Ya Killin' Me | Nurse | Unknown episodes |
| 2017–21 | Superstore | Ken | 6 episodes |
| 2018 | Take My Wife | Man Asking for Directions | Episode #2.8 |
| 2018–20 | Corporate | Baron | 9 episodes |
| 2019 | The New Negroes with Baron Vaughn and Open Mike Eagle | Himself (host) | 8 episodes |
| 2019–21 | Tuca & Bertie | Unknown Man (voice) | 2 episodes |
| 2019 | Black-ish | Doug | 2 episodes |
| 2020 | Wild Life | Hudson (voice) | 6 episodes |
| 2020 | Dream Corp LLC | Corporate Trainer | Episode: "Clone Disposal" |
| 2020 | The Great Debate | Host | 8 episodes |
| 2021 | History of Swear Words | Himself | 2 episodes |
| 2021 | Earth to Ned | Newscaster | Episode: "Like Father Like Ned?" |
| 2022 | Star Trek: Lower Decks | Captain Maier (voice) | 2 episodes |
| 2023 | Accused | Chad | Episode: "Brenda's Story" |

=== Video games ===
| Year | Title | Voice role |
|---|---|---|
| 2006 | Bully | Tad Spencer |
| 2007 | Manhunt 2 | Michael Grant |
| 2008 | Grand Theft Auto IV | The Crowd of Liberty City / Commercial |
