= Blackshear station =

Historic train station in Georgia, US

- Blackshear Depot
- U.S. National Register of Historic Places
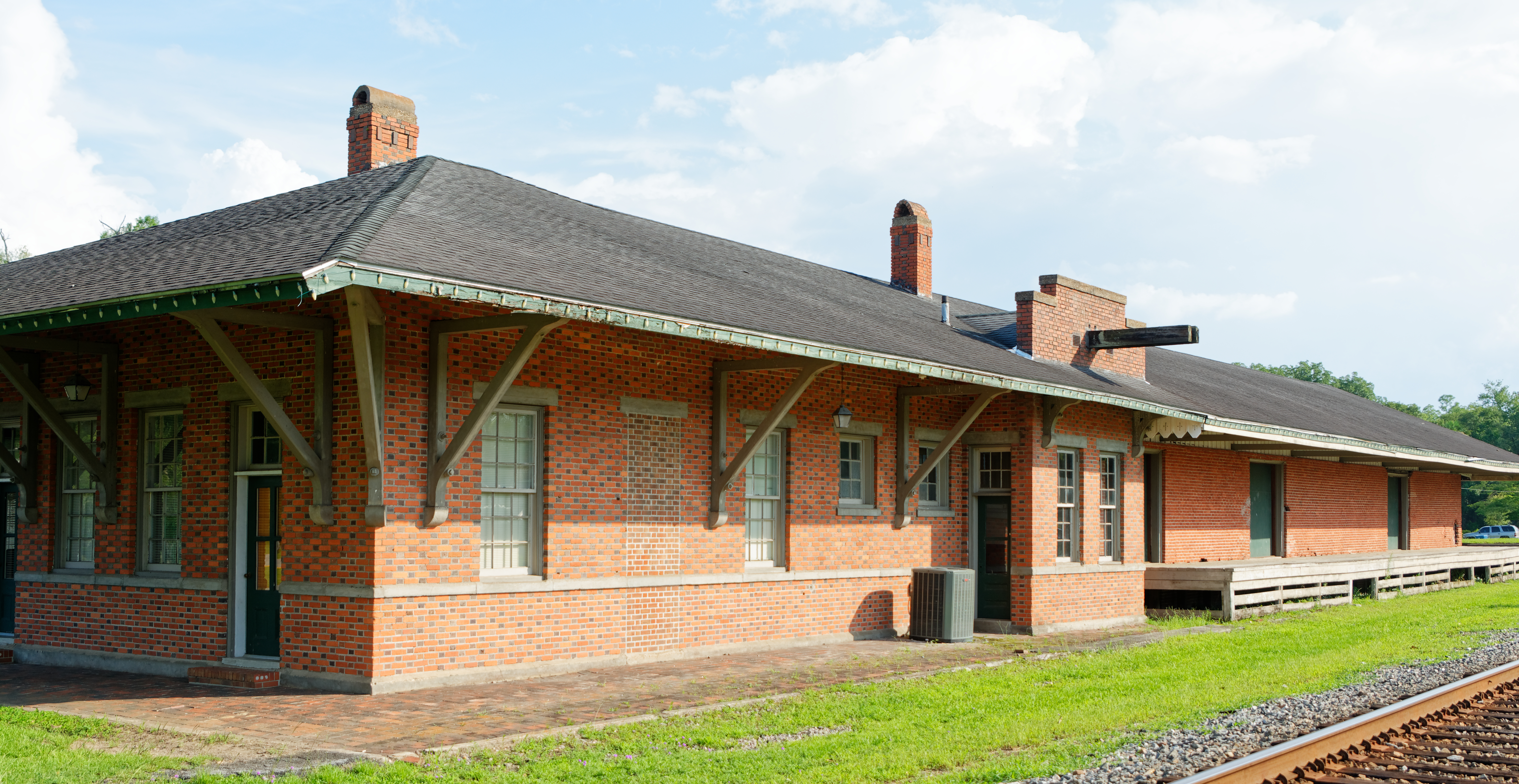

- Location within Georgia Location within the United States
- Location: 200 S. Central Ave., Blackshear, Georgia
- Coordinates: 31°18′9″N 82°14′29″W
- Area: 0.3 acres (0.12 ha)
- Built: 1917
- Built by: Savannah, Florida & Western RR Co.
- Architectural style: Depot
- NRHP reference No.: 00000070
- Added to NRHP: February 10, 2000

The Blackshear Depot is a train station located at 200 S. Central Ave. in Blackshear, Georgia. The station was built in 1917 by the Savannah, Florida & Western Railway It was used for passenger service into the 1950s and freight service in the 1970s. It is adjacent to the city hall and city park. It was listed on the National Register of Historic Places in 2000.

It is a one-story brick building with a long rectangular form, typical of depots in Georgia. It has a wide-eaved hipped roof over the main portion of the building, which held passenger waiting rooms and offices. It has a gabled-end roof over the long freight warehouse section of the building.

| Preceding station | Atlantic Coast Line Railroad | Following station |
|---|---|---|
| Waycross toward Tampa | Main Line | Patterson toward Richmond |
