= The Blackshear Times =

American weekly newspaper

- Type: Weekly newspaper
- Format: broadsheet
- Owner: Head Publishing
- Publisher: Rick Head
- Editor: Jason Deal
- Staff writers: Greg O'Driscoll
- Founded: 1889
- Headquarters: 126 NW Central Avenue; Blackshear, Georgia
- Circulation: 3,264 (as of 2013)
- Website: theblacksheartimes.com

The Blackshear Times is an American weekly newspaper founded in 1889 and published in Blackshear, Georgia. The Times is a community newspaper, and its coverage is primarily centered on the events in Pierce County, Georgia. The current owners of The Times are husband and wife Rick and Sandy Head, publisher and president, respectively. The paper's motto, as printed in the top-center of the front page, is "Liked by Many, Cussed by Some, Read by Them All."

== History ==
The name of weekly newspaper has been The Blackshear Times since October 10, 1889.

Exactly who came up with the name is not known, although E.Z. Byrd stated in an editorial on April 17, 1902, that "we presume it was Mr. B.D. Brantley, our present treasurer, who gave The Times its name." The paper was being published by The Times Publishing Company. It was owned by The A.P. Brantley Company.

On March 2, 1911, E.Z. Byrd, who had been owner of, or with, the county newspaper for 23 years, announced that he was selling The Times to Col. C.A. Sydnor.

The Times had eight owners over the next 15 years. Owners following Sydnor included H. (Harry) Johnsen, partners W.L. Knight and R.D. Thomas, W. Boyce Bailey, partners F.X. Ebner and G.M. Shepard, Jack Williams, W. Kirk Sutlive and Carl Broome.

Carl Broome eventually sold the newspaper to sons Lee and Dean Broome. The latter became sole owner of The Times in 1958 after having managed and edited the paper for 12 years under his father and as co-owner and editor with his brother Little change occurred in the operation after the takeover. On March 5, 1970, Dean Broome sold The Blackshear Times to Donald L. Ferrell.

When Ferrell bought the newspaper, he was part of the Pierce County Publishing Company. His partners were Roy Chalker Sr. and Wilkes Williams. Ferrell was president of the company.

Robert M. Williams Jr. bought into Blackshear Times and Pierce County Publishing Company on April 15, 1971, when he was age, 20 and he became its editor and publisher. In March 1976, Williams became sole editor and publisher when he bought out partners Roy Chalker Sr. and Wilkes Williams.

Williams moved The Times into a building previously known as Oak View Pharmacy, located on the corner of Gordon Street and Carter Avenue. The building was constructed by Quinton Boyette as a pharmacy building for Kenneth and Katherine Henley. The Henleys purchased the land from Mack Carter.

== Current ownership ==
Current editor and publishers are Rick and Sandra Head. The couple bought the Blackshear Times on August 1, 2023.

The Times currently uses a computerized newsroom to produce its products.

The newspaper operation moved to downtown Blackshear on SW Central Avenue in 2003 and moved to 121 SW Central Ave. in September 2012. The Times is currently housed at 126 NW Central Ave.

== Journalistic awards ==
The Blackshear Times has won over 360 awards total from the Georgia Press Association and National Newspaper Association during Williams' tenure as publisher.

== Associated newspapers ==
Head Publishing, LLC owns and publishes The Blackshear Times, The Brantley Beacon, and Waycross Journal-Herald.
