= Offerman, Georgia =

- City
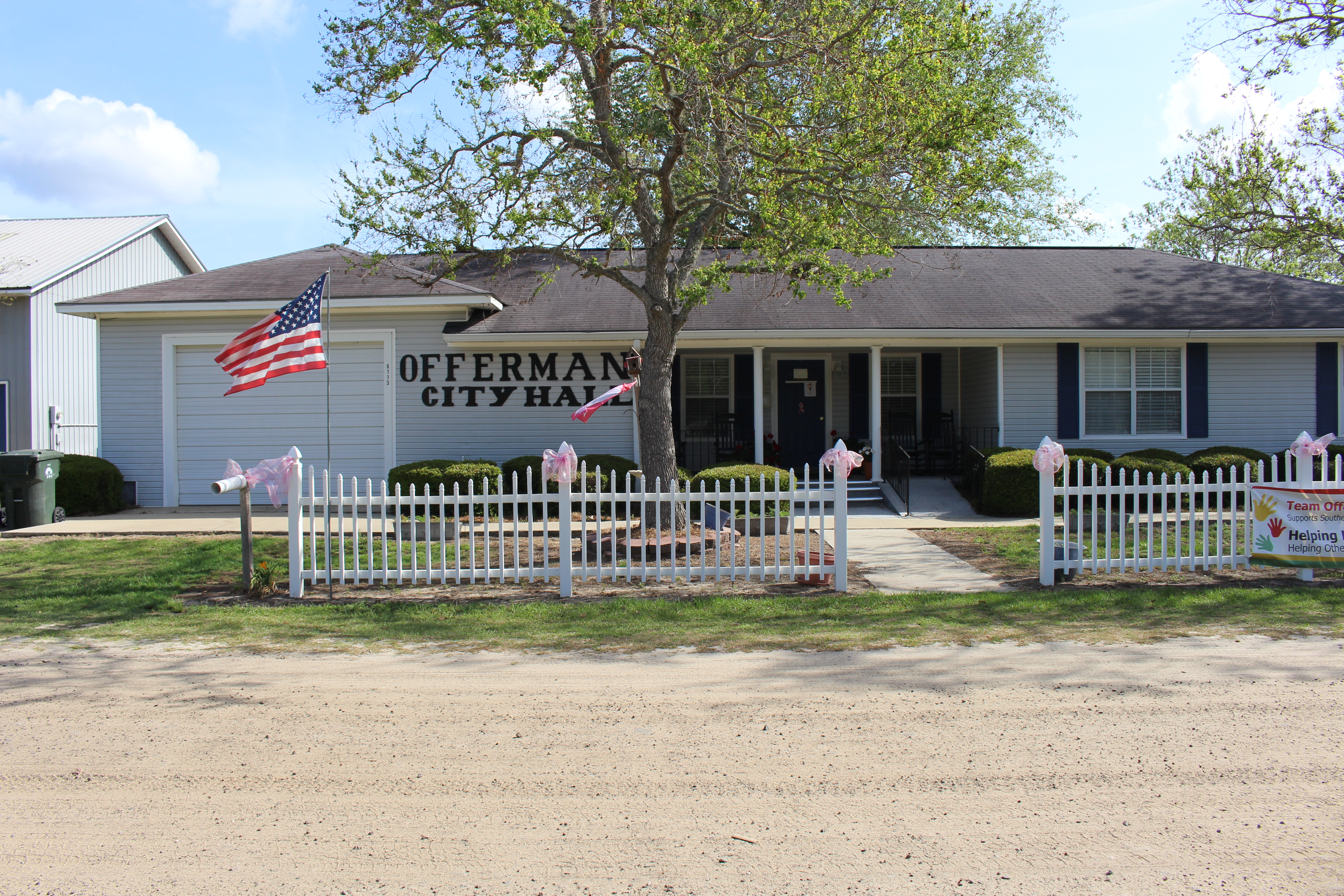
- Offerman City Hall

- Location in Pierce County and the state of Georgia
- Coordinates: 31°24′29″N 82°6′44″W
- Country: United States
- State: Georgia
- County: Pierce

Area
  - Total: 3.28 sq mi (8.49 km^{2})
  - Land: 3.27 sq mi (8.47 km^{2})
  - Water: 0.0039 sq mi (0.01 km^{2})
- Elevation: 105 ft (32 m)

Population (2020)
  - Total: 450
  - Density: 137.6/sq mi (53.11/km^{2})
- Time zone: UTC-5 (Eastern (EST))
  - Summer (DST): UTC-4 (EDT)
- ZIP code: 31556
- Area code: 912
- FIPS code: 13-57568
- GNIS feature ID: 0332558

Offerman is a city in Pierce County, Georgia, United States. As of the 2020 census, Offerman had a population of 450. It is part of the Waycross Micropolitan Statistical Area.

== Geography ==
Offerman is located at 31°24′29″N 82°6′44″W (31.408105, -82.112110).

According to the United States Census Bureau, the city has a total area of 3.1 square miles (8.0 km^{2}), all land.

== Demographics ==
Historical population
Census	Pop.	Note	%±
2000	403		—
2010	441		9.4%
2020	450		2.0%
U.S. Decennial Census

As of the census of 2000, there were 403 people, 160 households, and 119 families residing in the city. The population density was 128.2 inhabitants per square mile (49.5/km^{2}). There were 172 housing units at an average density of 54.7 per square mile (21.1/km^{2}). The racial makeup of the city was 83.62% White, 12.66% African American, 0.74% Native American, 0.25% Asian, 0.25% from other races, and 2.48% from two or more races. Hispanic or Latino of any race were 0.50% of the population.

There were 160 households, out of which 32.5% had children under the age of 18 living with them, 58.1% were married couples living together, 11.9% had a female householder with no husband present, and 25.6% were non-families. 23.8% of all households were made up of individuals, and 8.8% had someone living alone who was 65 years of age or older. The average household size was 2.52 and the average family size was 2.97.

In the city, the population was spread out, with 25.1% under the age of 18, 9.2% from 18 to 24, 29.5% from 25 to 44, 24.3% from 45 to 64, and 11.9% who were 65 years of age or older. The median age was 37 years. For every 100 females, there were 92.8 males. For every 100 females age 18 and over, there were 86.4 males.

The median income for a household in the city was $26,429, and the median income for a family was $31,875. Males had a median income of $28,750 versus $21,389 for females. The per capita income for the city was $11,393. About 18.6% of families and 21.6% of the population were below the poverty line, including 19.3% of those under age 18 and 52.2% of those age 65 or over.

== Government and infrastructure ==
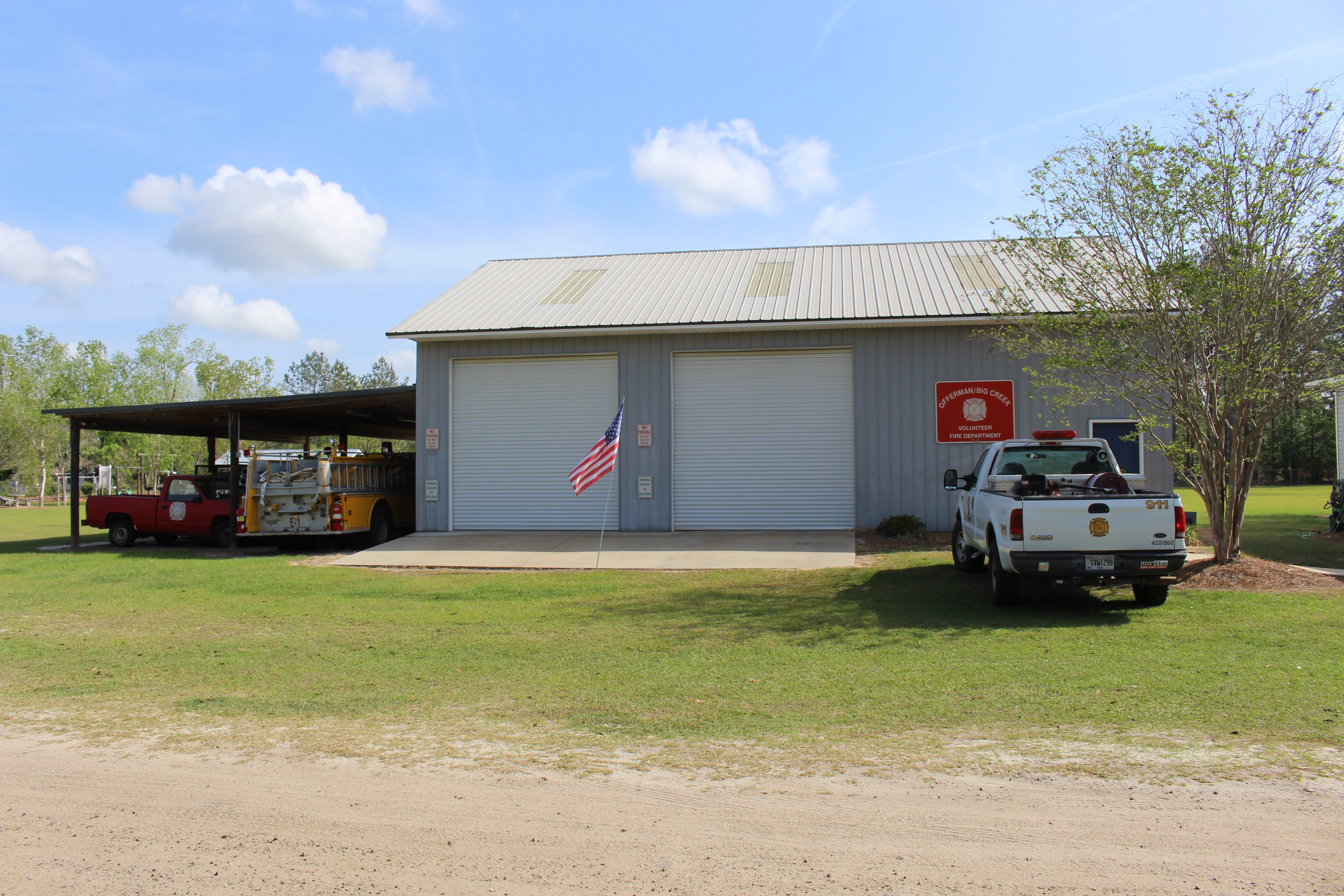
Offerman Big Creek Volunteer Fire Department

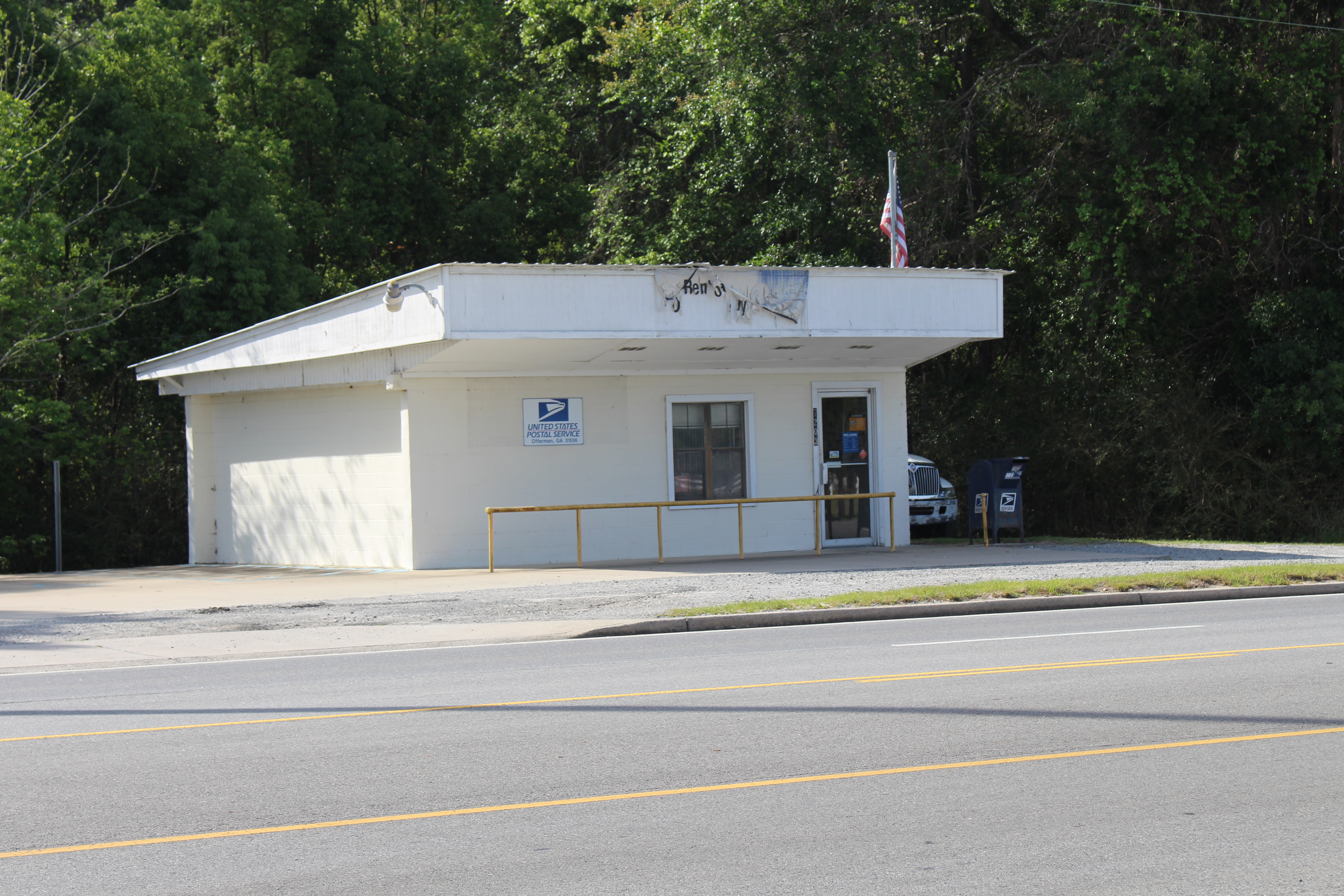
Offerman Post Office

The Offerman Big Creek Volunteer Fire Department operates fire protection services.

The U.S. Postal Service operates the Offerman Post Office.
