= Mershon, Georgia =

- Unincorporated community Census-designated place
- Location within Georgia
- Coordinates: 31°27′51″N 82°15′26″W
- Country: United States
- State: Georgia
- County: Pierce
- Elevation: 161 ft (49 m)

Population (2020)
  - Total: 44
- Time zone: UTC-5 (Eastern (EST))
  - Summer (DST): UTC-4 (EDT)
- Area code: 912
- GNIS feature ID: 318049

Mershon is an unincorporated community and census-designated place (CDP) in Pierce County, Georgia, United States.

The 2020 census listed a population of 44.

== History ==
A post office called Mershon was established in 1886. The community was named after Martin L. Mershon, a local judge.

== Demographics ==
Historical population
Census	Pop.	Note	%±
2020	44		—
U.S. Decennial Census; 2020

Mershon was first listed as a census designated place in the 2020 U.S. census.

Mershon CDP, Georgia – Racial and ethnic composition Note: the US Census treats Hispanic/Latino as an ethnic category. This table excludes Latinos from the racial categories and assigns them to a separate category. Hispanics/Latinos may be of any race.
Race / Ethnicity (NH = Non-Hispanic)	Pop 2020	% 2020
White alone (NH)	34	77.27%
Black or African American alone (NH)	0	0.00%
Native American or Alaska Native alone (NH)	0	0.00%
Asian alone (NH)	2	4.55%
Pacific Islander alone (NH)	0	0.00%
Some Other Race alone (NH)	0	0.00%
Mixed Race or Multi-Racial (NH)	1	2.27%
Hispanic or Latino (any race)	7	15.91%
Total	44	100.00%

In 2020, it had a population of 44.
