= WWUF =

- Waycross, Georgia; United States
- Frequency: 97.7 MHz
- Branding: 97.7 The Wolf

Programming
- Format: Hot AC
- Affiliations: ABC Radio

Ownership
- Owner: Broadcast South; (Higgs Multimedia Group, LLC)
- Sister stations: WKUB; WSGT

History
- First air date: January 25, 1986 (as WASE)
- Former call signs: WMUI (1984–1985); WASE (1985–1986)

Technical information
- Licensing authority: FCC
- Facility ID: 71149
- Class: A
- ERP: 6,000 watts
- HAAT: 99 meters
- Transmitter coordinates: 31°11′5.00″N 82°15′24.00″W

Links
- Public license information: Public file; LMS
- Webcast: Visit website
- Website: waycrossradio.com/977/

WWUF (97.7 FM) is a radio station broadcasting a Hot AC format. It is licensed to Waycross, Georgia, United States. The station is currently owned by John Higgs' Broadcast South, through licensee Higgs Multimedia Group, LLC, and features programming from ABC Radio.

== History ==
The station was assigned the call sign WMUI on February 29, 1984. On November 27, 1985, it changed its call sign to WASE, and changed on January 21, 1986, to the current WWUF.

On January 1, 2009, WWUF changed its format from oldies to classic hits, and on December 26, 2009, changed its format to hot AC. Current programming comes from Cumulus Media's Today's Best Hits format.
