= Women of Manhattan =

Women of Manhattan is a play written by John Patrick Shanley and originally produced in 1986.

== Production ==
Women of Manhattan premiered Off-Broadway in a Manhattan Theatre Club production at the City Center Theater on May 26, 1986, and closed on June 15, 1986, after 25 performances. Directed by Ron Lagomarsino, the cast featured Nancy Mette as Billie, J. Smith-Cameron as Rhonda, Jayne Haynes as Judy, Keith Szarabajka and Tom Wright.

The play was revived by Gesture & Discourse in New York in April, 1995. The play was later presented by The Barrow Group, at the John Houseman Studio Theater, running from May 30, 1997, officially on June 6, and ending June 29, 1997.

The play was produced in Santa Ana, California, in a Way Off Broadway production in February and March 1990. The play ran in San Francisco at the Next Stage in January 1999.

== Plot overview ==
The play revolves around the lives of three women living on the Upper West Side of Manhattan. Rhonda has recently split with her boyfriend, Billie is married, and Judy is considered a "fag hag" by the other two as she often unknowingly dates men who turn out to be homosexual.

== Critical response ==
Robert Coe wrote "this play, while beautifully written and complete, feels a little weightless", while a critic reviewing the 1999 San Francisco production for SF Weekly called it "an ordinary play, universal without being timeless". Mel Gussow, in his review for The New York Times, wrote: "These are the upper depths, specifically, the Upper West Side where conversation automatically becomes competitive, where everyone's consciousness is raised by the elixir of trendiness. The intention may have been to write a kind of Noel Coward comedy of Columbus Avenue, but the result mistakes brittleness for wit. Archness finishes in a dead heat with artificiality." The AP reviewer called the play a "slender character study masquerading as a play." The Los Angeles Times reviewer of the 1990 production noted: "Of course, providing accessible characters is one of Shanley's trademarks. He's written many, in both his plays ('Danny and the Deep Blue Sea' and 'Savage in Limbo') and screenplays ('Moonstruck'), and it's no surprise that we can get close to this threesome. That's really 'Women's' strength, and what makes it enough of a pleasure."

In reviewing the 1997 New York revival, the New York Times reviewer wrote: "In less capable hands, the trials of these lonely women in this light comedy of Upper West Side manners would be exercises in archness. But the trio of actresses who portray them -- Katie Davis as Billie, Fiona Gallagher as Rhonda Louise and especially Elizabeth Hanly Rice as Judy -- are so at home with Mr. Shanley's biting, smart-girl banter that Women of Manhattan radiates a surprising urbanity and wit...Mr. Shanley's 90-minute play consists of four vignettes in the social lives of the young women, the sharpest being a hilarious brunch in Rhonda's apartment that explicates the three unequal sides of their triangular relationship. The playwright and the director, Paul Rice, appreciate the high drama in the minor problems that overwhelm these 30-ish women..."
