= Art Good =

American radio personality

Art Good is an American radio personality who helped make smooth jazz popular during the 1980s through his program JazzTrax.

Before becoming a disk jockey, he contemplated becoming a minister. In 1981, while he was Program Director for KIFM, a struggling adult contemporary station in San Diego, he began an evening program of jazz-tinged instrumentals entitled Lites Out San Diego. By 1987, KIFM had changed its format to contemporary jazz. Good left KIFM for a brief period to host a program on competitor KSWV 102.9 but returned when the station discontinued its smooth jazz format.

In 1987, he founded the Catalina JazzTrax Festival on Santa Catalina Island in California. That festival hosted Spyro Gyra, Al Di Meola, Earl Klugh, and Andy Narell.

He was given an Industry Achievement Award at the National Smooth Jazz Awards in San Diego.
