= Patterson, Georgia =

- City
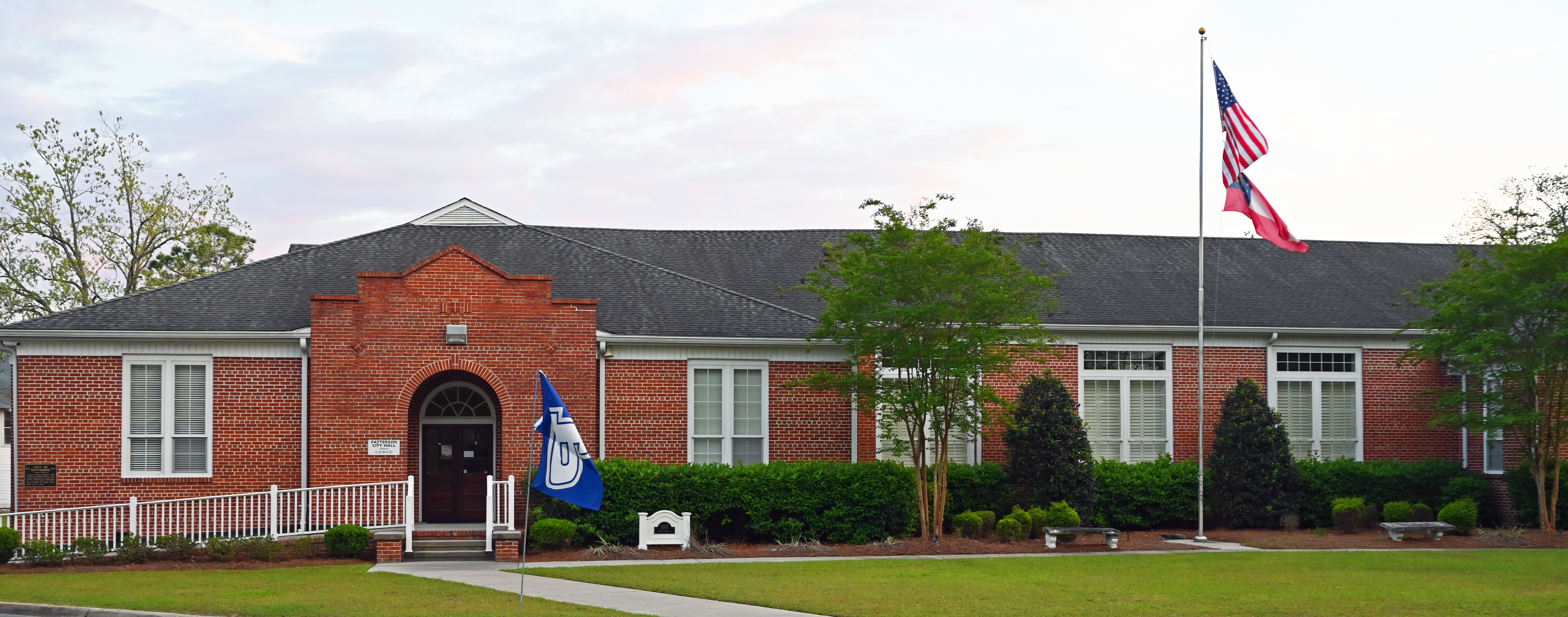
- Patterson City Hall

- Location in Pierce County and the state of Georgia
- Coordinates: 31°23′14″N 82°8′18″W
- Country: United States
- State: Georgia
- County: Pierce

Area
  - Total: 2.65 sq mi (6.86 km^{2})
  - Land: 2.64 sq mi (6.83 km^{2})
  - Water: 0.0077 sq mi (0.02 km^{2})
- Elevation: 105 ft (32 m)

Population (2020)
  - Total: 749
  - Density: 283.8/sq mi (109.59/km^{2})
- Time zone: UTC-5 (Eastern (EST))
  - Summer (DST): UTC-4 (EDT)
- ZIP code: 31557
- Area code: 912
- FIPS code: 13-59500
- GNIS feature ID: 0332619
- Website: cityofpattersonga.com

Patterson is a city in Pierce County, Georgia, United States. The population was 749 in 2020.

== History ==
Patterson was named after William Paterson, the proprietor of a local sawmill. The Georgia General Assembly incorporated Patterson in 1893.

== Geography ==
Patterson is located at 31°23′14″N 82°08′18″W. According to the United States Census Bureau, the city has a total area of 2.7 square miles (7.0 km^{2}), all land.

=== Climate ===
Climate data for Patterson, Georgia
Month	Jan	Feb	Mar	Apr	May	Jun	Jul	Aug	Sep	Oct	Nov	Dec	Year
Mean daily maximum °C (°F)	17 (63)	19 (66)	21 (70)	26 (78)	29 (85)	32 (90)	33 (92)	33 (92)	31 (87)	26 (79)	21 (69)	17 (62)	26 (78)
Mean daily minimum °C (°F)	4 (39)	3 (38)	7 (44)	11 (51)	16 (60)	20 (68)	21 (70)	22 (71)	19 (67)	13 (56)	7 (44)	3 (38)	12 (54)
Average precipitation mm (inches)	110 (4.2)	97 (3.8)	110 (4.3)	86 (3.4)	94 (3.7)	140 (5.5)	150 (6.1)	140 (5.7)	99 (3.9)	79 (3.1)	58 (2.3)	71 (2.8)	220 (8.7)
Source: Weatherbase

== Demographics ==
Historical population
Census	Pop.	Note	%±
1900	314		—
1910	264		−15.9%
1920	357		35.2%
1930	528		47.9%
1940	541		2.5%
1950	656		21.3%
1960	719		9.6%
1970	788		9.6%
1980	763		−3.2%
1990	626		−18.0%
2000	627		0.2%
2010	730		16.4%
2020	749		2.6%
U.S. Decennial Census

Patterson racial composition as of 2020
Race	Num.	Perc.
White (non-Hispanic)	601	80.24%
Black or African American (non-Hispanic)	99	13.22%
Asian	2	0.27%
Other/Mixed	23	3.07%
Hispanic or Latino	24	3.2%

As of the 2020 United States census, there were 749 people, 311 households, and 168 families residing in the city.

== Notable people ==
- KaDee Strickland, actress (b. 1975) Born in Blackshear but she grew up in Patterson and went to school in Pierce County. Her successful acting career includes a starring role in the television series Private Practice.
- Lindsay Thomas, Congressman born in Patterson.
- Naomi Whitehead, the oldest living American since October 22, 2024, and second-oldest living person in the world, grew up in Patterson.
