= Blackshear, Georgia =

- City
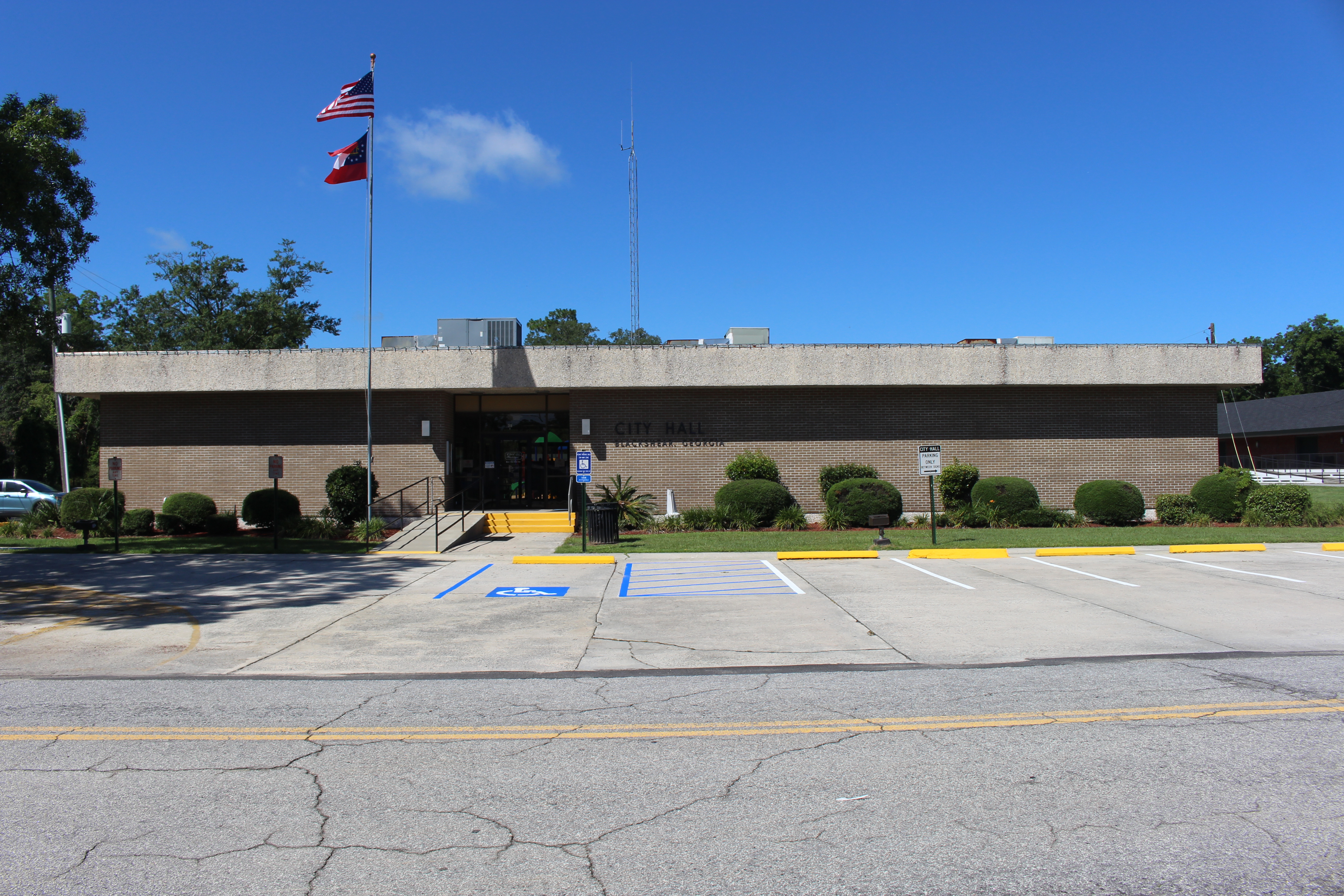
- Blackshear City Hall

- Location in Pierce County and the state of Georgia
- Coordinates: 31°17′56″N 82°14′52″W
- Country: United States
- State: Georgia
- County: Pierce

Government
  - Mayor: Keith Brooks

Area
  - Total: 5.14 sq mi (13.32 km^{2})
  - Land: 5.07 sq mi (13.12 km^{2})
  - Water: 0.077 sq mi (0.20 km^{2})
- Elevation: 112 ft (34 m)

Population (2020)
  - Total: 3,506
  - Density: 692/sq mi (267.2/km^{2})
- Time zone: UTC-5 (Eastern (EST))
  - Summer (DST): UTC-4 (EDT)
- ZIP code: 31516
- Area code: 912
- FIPS code: 13-08284
- GNIS feature ID: 0331178
- Website: blackshearga.org

The city of Blackshear is the county seat of Pierce County, Georgia, United States. As of the 2020 census, the city had a population of 3,506.

Blackshear is part of the Waycross Micropolitan Statistical Area.

== Geography ==
Blackshear is located at 31°17′56″N 82°14′52″W (31.298941, -82.247726).

According to the United States Census Bureau, the city has a total area of 4.4 square miles (11 km^{2}), of which 4.3 square miles (11 km^{2}) is land and 0.1 square miles (0.26 km^{2}) (2.06%) is water.

== History ==
Blackshear was founded in 1858 to serve as the seat of the newly formed Pierce County. The city was named after General David Blackshear, who authorized the construction of roads, bridges and 11 forts for defense. He was a patriot in the American Revolution, fighting in the Battle of Moore's Creek Bridge and the Battle of Buford's Bridge. He served as a general during the War of 1812. He also served in the Georgia state legislature as Senator of Laurens County.

During the American Civil War, the city became a temporary prisoner-of-war camp for more than 5,000 Union prisoners. This site is marked by a historical landmark sign.

The primary crop of this south Georgia community was once tobacco, and it is where the first brick tobacco warehouse in Georgia was built, known as the Brantley Brick.

== Demographics ==
Historical population
Census	Pop.	Note	%±
1860	319		—
1870	490		53.6%
1880	778		58.8%
1890	656		−15.7%
1900	876		33.5%
1910	1,235		41.0%
1920	1,329		7.6%
1930	1,817		36.7%
1940	2,010		10.6%
1950	2,271		13.0%
1960	2,482		9.3%
1970	2,624		5.7%
1980	3,222		22.8%
1990	3,263		1.3%
2000	3,283		0.6%
2010	3,445		4.9%
2020	3,506		1.8%
U.S. Decennial Census

=== 2020 census ===
As of the 2020 census, Blackshear had a population of 3,506. The median age was 40.9 years. 24.8% of residents were under the age of 18 and 22.0% of residents were 65 years of age or older. For every 100 females there were 85.6 males, and for every 100 females age 18 and over there were 78.5 males age 18 and over.

0.0% of residents lived in urban areas, while 100.0% lived in rural areas.

There were 1,428 households in Blackshear, of which 30.3% had children under the age of 18 living in them. Of all households, 38.5% were married-couple households, 16.2% were households with a male householder and no spouse or partner present, and 40.1% were households with a female householder and no spouse or partner present. About 35.1% of all households were made up of individuals and 18.3% had someone living alone who was 65 years of age or older. There were 898 families residing in the city.

There were 1,606 housing units, of which 11.1% were vacant. The homeowner vacancy rate was 3.1% and the rental vacancy rate was 6.8%.

Blackshear racial composition as of 2020
Race	Num.	Perc.
White (non-Hispanic)	2,552	72.79%
Black or African American (non-Hispanic)	696	19.85%
Native American	5	0.14%
Asian	24	0.68%
Other/Mixed	138	3.94%
Hispanic or Latino	91	2.6%

== Education ==
=== Pierce County School District ===
The Pierce County School District holds grades pre-school to grade twelve, and consists of three elementary schools, a middle school and a high school. The district has 216 full-time teachers and over 3,240 students. Four schools in the district are located in Blackshear.

- Blackshear Elementary School
- Midway Elementary School
- Patterson Elementary School
- Pierce County Middle School
- Pierce County High School

=== Private Education ===
- Crossroads Christian Academy

== Notable people ==
- Stetson Bennett (born 1997), quarterback for the University of Georgia Bulldogs football. Two-time national champion. NFL LA Rams draftee
- Ella Thomas Foreacre Brantley (1864–1948), President, Georgia Federation of Women's Clubs
- Nikki DeLoach (born 1979), actress and singer born in Waycross, but was raised in Blackshear
- KaDee Strickland (born 1975), actress

== See also ==
- The Blackshear Times (newspaper)
