= Ware County School District =

School district in Georgia (U.S. state)

Address
- 1301 Bailey Street Waycross, Georgia, 31501-6503; United States
- Coordinates: 31.226384°N 82.362672°W

District information
- Grades: Pre-kindergarten – 12
- Superintendent: Bert Smith
- Accreditation(s): Southern Association of Colleges and Schools; Georgia Accrediting Commission

Students and staff
- Enrollment: 5,973 (2022–23)
- Faculty: 452.90 (FTE)
- Student–teacher ratio: 13.19

Other information
- Telephone: (912) 283-8656
- Fax: (912) 283-8698
- Website: ware.k12.ga.us

The Ware County School District is a public school district in Ware County, Georgia, United States, based in Waycross. It serves the communities of Deenwood, Dixie Union, Manor, Millwood, Ruskin, Sunnyside, Waresboro, and Waycross.

== Schools ==
The Ware County School District has a pre-school, six elementary schools, two middle schools, and one high school.

=== Pre-schools ===
- Daffodil Preschool

=== Elementary schools ===
- Waresboro Elementary School
- Memorial Drive Elementary School
- Williams Heights Elementary School
- Center Elementary School
- Wacona Elementary
- Ruskin Elementary School

=== Middle school ===
- Waycross Middle School
- Ware County Middle School

=== High school ===
- Ware County High School
