= List of census-designated places in Georgia =

Map of the United States with Georgia highlighted

Census-designated places (CDPs) are unincorporated communities lacking elected municipal officers and boundaries with legal status. The term "census designated place" has been used as an official classification by the U.S. Census Bureau since 1980. Prior to that, select unincorporated communities were surveyed in the U.S. Census.

Since Tucker and Brookhaven (North Atlanta CDP) incorporated after the 2010 Census, Georgia has 138 census designated places as of 2020.

== Census-designated places ==
CDP	County	Location of County	Population (2020)	Population (2010)	Population (2000)	Population (1990)	Population (1980)	Notes
Antioch	Harris		613	x	x	x	x	
Appling	Columbia		658	x	x	x	x	
Axson	Atkinson		360	x	x	x	x	
Belvedere Park	DeKalb		15,113	15,152	18,945	18,089	17,766	
Bemiss	Lowndes		8,999	x	x	x	x	
Berry College	Floyd		1,565	x	x	x	x	
Bolingbroke	Monroe		497	x	x	x	x	
Bonanza	Clayton		4,406	3,135	2,904	x	x	
Box Springs	Talbot		303	x	x	x	x	
Boykin	Miller		151	143	x	x	x	
Bristol	Pierce		122	x	x	x	x	
Buckhead	Bryan		4,441	x	x	x	x	
Calvary	Grady		129	161	x	x	x	
Candler-McAfee	DeKalb		22,468	23,025	28,294	29,491	27,306	
Canoochee	Emanuel		70	71	x	x	x	
Cataula	Harris		1,433	x	x	x	x	
Cedar Springs	Early		75	74	x	x	x	
Chattanooga Valley	Walker		3,962	3,846	4,065	4,088	x	
Cherry Log	Gilmer		99	119	x	x	x	
Clyattville	Lowndes		552	x	x	x	x	
Cogdell	Clinch		23	x	x	x	x	
Coleman	Randolph		116	127	149	137	164	Dissolved as a town in 2007 although still listed as a CDP in 2000. Listed as a town prior to 2000.
Conley	Clayton		6,680	6,228	6,188	5,528	6,033	
Country Club Estates	Glynn		8,373	8,545	7,594	5,192	x	
Crescent	McIntosh		838	x	x	x	x	
Crooked Creek	Putnam		685	639	x	x	x	
Deenwood	Ware		2,207	2,146	1,836	2,055	3,580	Listed as the unincorporated place of Hebardville in the 1950 U.S. census (pop. 1,113) and 1960 U.S. census. Named change to Deenwood in the 1970 U.S. census with a population of 3,015
Dewy Rose	Elbert		161	154	x	x	x	
Dixie	Brooks		121	x	x	x	x	
Dixie Union	Ware		184	x	x	x	x	
Dock Junction	Glynn		8,266	7,721	6,951	7,094	6,189	Previously listed as an unincorporated place in 1970 (pop 6,009), 1960 (pop 5,417), and 1950 (pop 4,160)
Druid Hills	DeKalb		9,429	14,568	12,741	12,174	12,700	
Dutch Island	Chatham		1,238	1,247	x	x	x	
Eagle Grove	Hart		139	164	x	x	x	
East Griffin	Spalding		1,561	1,451	1,635	1,569	1,570	East Griffin was listed as an unincorporated place in the 1950 U.S. census (pop 1,539), the 1960 U.S. census (pop 1,715), and the 1970 U.S. census (pop 1,479)
East Newnan	Coweta		1,022	1,321	1,305	1,173	1,495	In 1970, East Newnan was listed as an unincorporated place with a population of 1,634
Ellerslie	Harris		1,053	x	x	x	x	
Empire	Bleckley; Dodge		319	393	x	x	x	Listed as an incorporated place in the 1920, 1930, 1940, and 1950 U.S. Censuses
Epworth	Fannin		668	480	x	x	x	Epworth was listed as a town in the 1910, 1920, and 1930 censuses
Eulonia	McIntosh		351	x	x	x	x	
Evans	Columbia		34,536	29,011	17,727	12,220	x	
Everett	Glynn		158	x	x	x	x	
Experiment	Spalding		3,328	2,894	3,233	3,762	3,731	Previously listed as an unincorporated place in 1970 (pop 2,256), 1960 (pop 2,497), and 1950 (pop 4,265)
Faceville	Decatur		136	x	x	x	x	
Fair Oaks	Cobb		9,028	8,225	8,443	6,996	8,486	Fair Oaks was listed as an unincorporated place in the 1950 U.S. census (pop 3,181) and the 1960 U.S. census (pop 7,543) but was not listed in the 1970 U.S. census
Fairfield Plantation	Carroll		4,898	x	x	x	x	
Fairplay	Douglas		1,267	x	x	x	x	
Fairview	Walker		6,409	6,769	6,601	6,444	6,558	
Fort Stewart	Liberty		8,821	4,924	11,205	13,774	15,031	In 1970, Fort Stewart was listed as an unincorporated place with a population of 4,467
Gardi	Wayne		91	x	x	x	x	
Georgetown	Chatham		11,916	11,823	10,599	5,554	2,785	
Glenn	Heard		101	x	x	x	x	
Godfrey	Morgan		108	x	x	x	x	Listed as a village in the 1910 through 1960 U.S. Censuses.
Gough	Burke		137	x	x	x	x	
Gresham Park	DeKalb		7,700	7,432	9,215	9,000	6,232	
Gumlog	Franklin		2,358	2,146	2,025	1,436	x	
Hannahs Mill	Upson		3,121	3,298	3,267	x	2,616	Did not appear in the 1990 Census after being partially annexed to Thomaston.
Hardwick	Baldwin		3,513	3,930	5,135	4,910	8,977	Listed as an unincorporated place in 1970 (pop 14,047), in 1960 (pop 16,909 ), and 1950 (pop 14,774).
Henderson	Chatham		2,178	1,647	x	x	x	
Heron Bay	Henry; Spalding		4,673	3,384	x	x	x	
Hickox	Brantley		234	x	x	x	x	
Hilltop	Pike		245	262	401	x	x	
Hortense	Brantley		252	x	x	x	x	
Howard	Taylor		50	110	x	x	x	
Indian Springs	Catoosa		2,336	2,241	1,982	1,273	x	
Irondale	Clayton		8,740	7,446	7,727	3,352	x	
Isle of Hope	Chatham		2,357	2,402	2,605	2,637	x	
Jekyll Island	Glynn		866	x	x	x	x	
Juliette	Monroe		290	x	x	x	x	
Kennesaw State University	Cobb		382	x	x	x	x	
Kings Bay Base	Camden		2,329	1,777	2,599	3,463	x	
Knoxville	Crawford		65	69	x	x	x	Appeared as a village in the 1890 through 1910 censuses
Lakeview	Catoosa; Walker		4,777	4,839	4,820	5,184	5,403	
Lakeview Estates	Rockdale		2,660	2,695	2,637	1,344	1,576	
Lincoln Park	Upson		817	833	1122	x	1,755	Did not appear in the 1990 Census after being partially annexed to Thomaston. Appeared as an unincorporated place 1970 (pop 1,852), 1960 (pop 1,840), and 1950 (pop 1,575).
Lindale	Floyd		4,283	4,191	4,088	4,187	2,958	Listed as an unincorporated place with a population of 2,768 in the 1970 U.S. census
Lithia Springs	Douglas		16,644	15,491	2,072	11,403	9,145	Listed as a town in the 2000 U.S. census and then redesignated a CDP in the 2010 U.S. census
Manor	Ware		94	x	x	x	x	
Martinez	Columbia		34,535	35,795	27,749	29,877	16,472	
Matthews	Jefferson		146	150	x	x	x	
Mendes	Tattnall		124	122	x	x	x	
Mershon	Pierce		44	x	x	x	x	
Millwood	Ware		72	x	x	x	x	
Milstead	Rockdale		628	x	x	x	x	
Mineral Bluff	Fannin		223	150	x	163	130	Appeared as a town in the 1890 through 1990 censuses
Montgomery	Chatham		4,443	4,523	4,134	4,327	x	
Moody AFB	Lowndes		1,307	886	993	1,288	1,297	In 1970, Moody Air Force Base was listed as an unincorporated place with a population of 1,424
Mountain Park	Gwinnett		13,089	11,554	11,753	11,025	9,425	
Musella	Crawford		104	x	x	x	x	
Naylor	Lowndes		139	x	x	x	x	
New England	Dade		546	x	x	x	x	
Norristown	Emanuel		54	50	x	x	x	
North Decatur	DeKalb		18,511	16,698	15,270	12,830	11,830	
North Druid Hills	DeKalb		20,385	18,947	18,852	14,170	12,438	
Ohoopee	Toombs		29	x	x	x	x	
Panthersville	DeKalb		11,237	9,749	11,791	9,874	11,366	
Perkins	Jenkins		93	91	x	x	x	
Phillipsburg	Tift		640	707	887	1,044	2,450	Previously listed as an unincorporated place in 1970 (pop 2,335) and 1960 (pop 2,037)
Piney Grove	Harris		434	x	x	x	x	
Putney	Dougherty		2,869	2,898	2,998	3,108	x	
Raoul	Habersham		2,803	2,558	1,816	1,674	x	
Redan	DeKalb		31,749	33,015	33,841	24,376	x	
Reed Creek	Hart		2,724	2,604	2,148	1,796	x	
Robins AFB	Houston		1,061	1,170	3,949	3,092	3,571	
Rock Spring	Walker		891	x	x	x	x	
Rockingham	Bacon		230	248	x	x	x	
Russell	Barrow		1,322	1,203	x	x	x	
Salem	Upson		307	310	339	x	x	
Satilla	Jeff Davis		487	421	x	x	x	
Sautee Nacoochee	White		332	363	x	x	x	
Scottdale	DeKalb		10,698	10,631	9,803	8,636	8,770	
Seville	Wilcox		197	202	x	x	x	
Shannon	Floyd		1,919	1,862	1,682	1,514	2,040	Listed as an unincorporated community in the 1950 U.S. census (pop 1,563) and the 1960 U.S. census (pop 1,629).
Skidaway Island	Chatham		9,310	8,341	6,914	4,495	1,264	
Smarr	Monroe		218	x	x	x	x	
St. Simons	Glynn		14,982	12,743	13,381	12,026	6,566	Previously listed as an unincorporated place in 1970 (pop 5,346), 1960 (pop 3,199), and 1950 (pop 1,706)
Sterling	Glynn		2,534	x	x	x	x	
Stockton	Lanier		135	x	x	x	x	
Sunny Side	Spalding		203	x	x	x	x	
Sunnyside	Ware		1,472	1,303	1,385	1,506	1,658	
Sunset Village	Upson		921	846	871	x	x	
Talahi Island	Chatham		1,247	1,248	x	x	x	
Tate City	Towns		27	16	x	x	x	
Tazewell	Marion		93	x	x	x	x	
The Rock	Upson		179	160	x	88	78	Former town dissolved in 1995
Unionville	Tift		1,688	1,845	2,074	2,710	1,942	Previously listed as an unincorporated place in 1970 (pop 1,646) and 1960 (pop 1,607)
Vinings	Cobb		12,581	9,734	9,677	7,417	x	
Waresboro	Ware		375	x	x	x	x	
Warthen	Washington		132	x	x	x	x	
Waverly	Camden		281	x	x	x	x	
Waynesville	Brantley		331	x	x	x	x	
Wenona	Crisp		231	x	x	x	x	
West Brow	Dade		887	x	x	x	x	
Whitemarsh Island	Chatham		6,983	6,792	5,824	2,554	x	
Wildwood	Dade		382	x	x	x	x	
Wilmington Island	Chatham		15,129	15,138	14,213	11,230	7,546	
Yonah	White		657	507	x	x	x	

== Former Census-Designated Places ==
CDP	County	Location of County	Population (2020)	Population (2010)	Population (2000)	Population (1990)	Population (1980)	Notes
North Atlanta	DeKalb		x	40,456	38,579	27,812	30,521	Designated as North Atlanta CDP through the 2010 U.S. census. Incorporated as Brookhaven city in 2012.
Sandy Springs	Fulton		x	x	85,781	67,842	46,877	Incorporated prior to the 2010 Census
Statenville	Echols		x	1,040	x	x	x	Appeared as a CDP in the 2010 U.S. census. Consolidated into Echols County government thereafter.
Tucker	DeKalb		x	27,581	26,532	25,781	25,399	Appeared as a CDP in the 2010 U.S. census. Incorporated as a city in 2015.
Garden Lakes	Floyd		x	x	x	x	4,053	First appeared as an unincorporated community name Alto Park in the 1950 census (pop 1,195) and 1960 census (pop. 2,526). The unincorporated place was renamed Alto Park-Garden Lakes in the 1970 census (pop 2,963) and then appeared as the Garden Lakes CDP in the 1980 census (pop. 4,053). Absorbed into Rome city prior to the 1990 census.
Gainesville Mills	Hall		x	x	x	1,084	1,281	Listed as the unincorporated community Gainesville Cotton Mills in the 1950 U.S. census (pop. 1,708), 1960 U.S. census (pop. 2,207), and 1970 U.S. census (pop. 2,060). Listed as the Gainesville Mills CDP in the 1980 United States census. It was deleted prior to the 2000 U.S. census.
