= John McIntosh Kell =

Officer in the Confederate navy during the American Civil War (1823–1900)

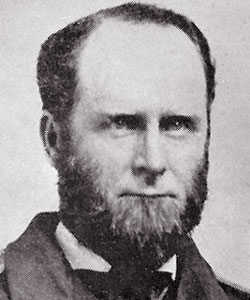
- Born: January 26, 1823; Darien, Georgia, U.S.
- Died: October 5, 1900 (aged 77); Sunnyside, Georgia, U.S.
- Burial place: Oak Hill Cemetery; Griffin, Georgia, U.S.
- Military career
- Allegiance: United States of America; Confederate States
- Branch: United States Navy; Confederate Navy
- Service years: 1841–1861 (USN); 1861–1865 (CSN)
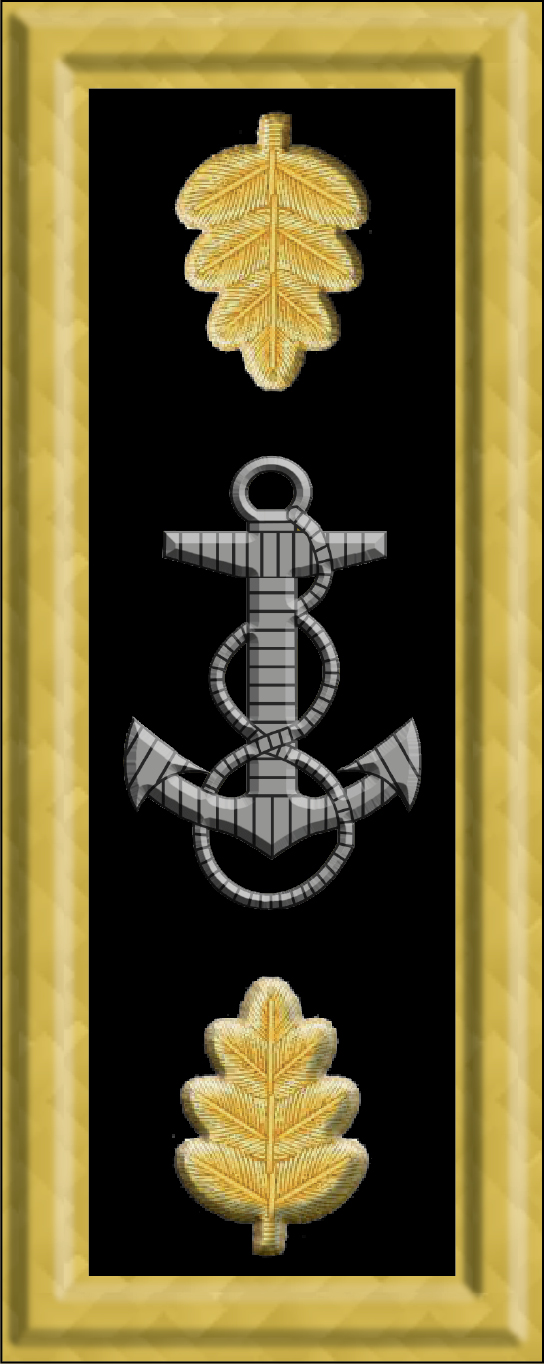
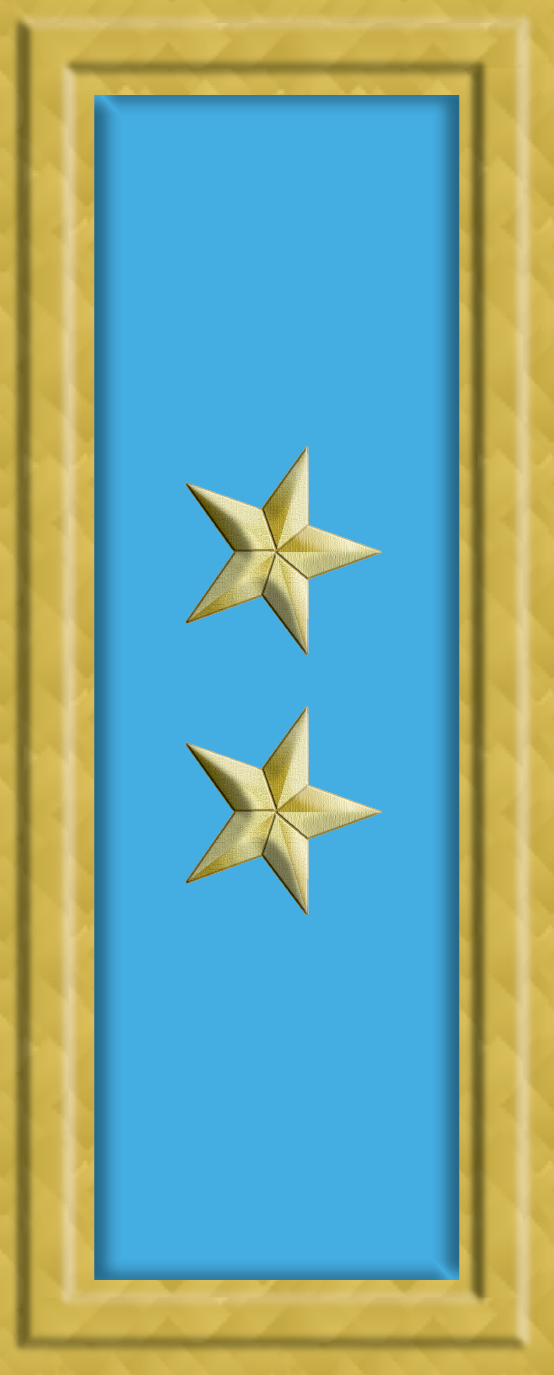
- Rank: Lieutenant Commander (USN) Commander (CSN)
- Commands: CSS Savannah; CSS Richmond
- Conflicts: Opening of Japan; Mexican–American War; American Civil War: Battle of Cherbourg; Action off Galveston Light

John McIntosh Kell (January 26, 1823 – October 5, 1900) was an officer in the Confederate navy during the American Civil War, during which time Kell was First Lieutenant and Executive Officer of the commerce raider CSS Alabama.

== Early life ==
John McIntosh Kell was born near Darien, Georgia on January 26, 1823, the son of John and Margery Spalding Baillie Kell. He spent his childhood at Laurel Grove Plantation and with his great uncle Thomas Spalding, whose family owned a large part of Sapelo Island.

== Career ==
Kell was appointed midshipman at the age of 17 in the United States Navy on September 9, 1841. He would serve in the Mexican War, was a member of the expedition of Commodore Matthew Perry to Japan in 1853 and Master of the flagship USS Mississippi on the cruise home. When Georgia seceded from the Union in early 1861, Lieutenant Kell resigned from the United States Navy and was the first Naval officer to render his services to the Confederate States.

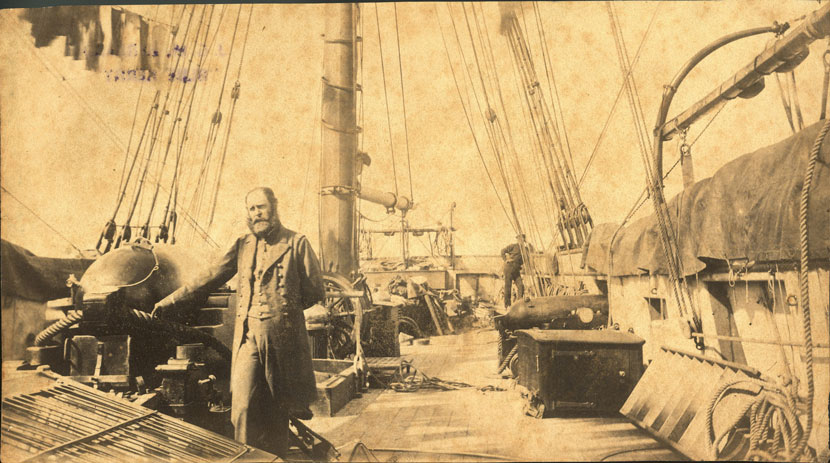
John McIntosh Kell on CSS Alabama

In April 1861, he commanded the Georgia state gunboat CSS Savannah; but received a Confederate States Navy commission as First Lieutenant the following month and was sent to New Orleans. He then served as executive officer of the CSS Sumter under the command of Captain Raphael Semmes during Sumter's commerce raiding voyage during 1861–62.

First Lieutenant Kell was Semmes' Executive Officer on CSS Alabama throughout her career and was on board when she was sunk by USS Kearsarge in June 1864. He was rescued by the British yacht Dearhound and taken to England. Promoted to the rank of Commander in that month, he commanded the ironclad CSS Richmond in the James River Squadron in 1865.

=== After the war ===
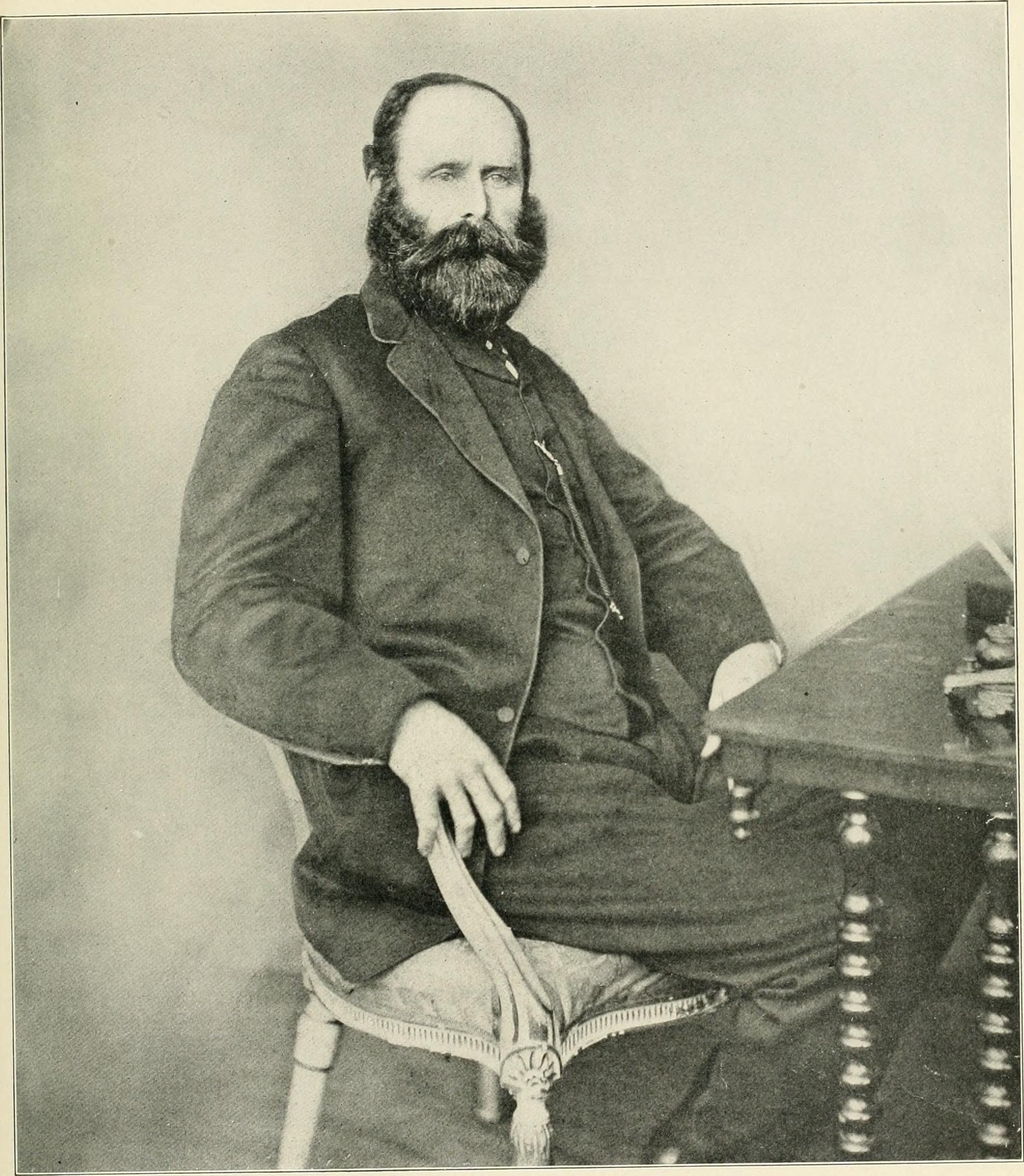
John Mcintosh Kell during Civil War

After the end of the Civil War, Kell returned home to Georgia and became a farmer. Later years, he served as Adjutant General of Georgia. He also served as an early keeper of the Capitol Building and Grounds. His work in the U.S. Navy, C.S.A. Navy, and work as groundskeeper at the Capitol were all commemorated through symbolism in the portrait of him commissioned by the Georgia General Assembly in 1912. He wrote his memoir, Recollections of a Naval Life Including the Cruises of Confederate Steamers "Sumter" and "Alabama" near the end of his life, It was released in 1900.

John McIntosh Kell died at his home in Sunnyside, Georgia on October 5, 1900, and is buried in Oak Hill Cemetery, Griffin, Georgia. The Georgia General Assembly honored him posthumously with a portrait in by Emma Cheves Wilkinson in 1912.

=== Honors ===
The John McIntosh Kell Camp #107 of the Sons of Confederate Veterans located in Griffin, Georgia, is named in his memory and honor on July 18, 1898.

== Papers ==
The Georgia Historical Society holds the papers of John McIntosh Kell and his wife, Julia Blanche Munroe Kell.

- John McIntosh Kell Papers
- Julia Blanche Munroe Kell papers

== See also ==
- Bibliography of early American naval history
- Bibliography of the American Civil War
- List of ships captured in the 19th century

== Sources ==
- Kell, John McIntosh (1900). Recollections of a naval life : including the cruises of the Confederate States steamers "Sumpter" and "Alabama". Washington : Neale.
- Ellicott, John Morris (1905). The life of John Ancrum Winslow, rear-admiral, United States navy, who commanded the U.S. steamer "Kearsarge" in her action with the Confederate cruiser "Alabama";. New York and London, G.P. Putnam's sons.
