= Waycross micropolitan area =

Waycross Micropolitan Area
- Micropolitan Statistical Area
- Waycross, GA Micropolitan Statistical Area
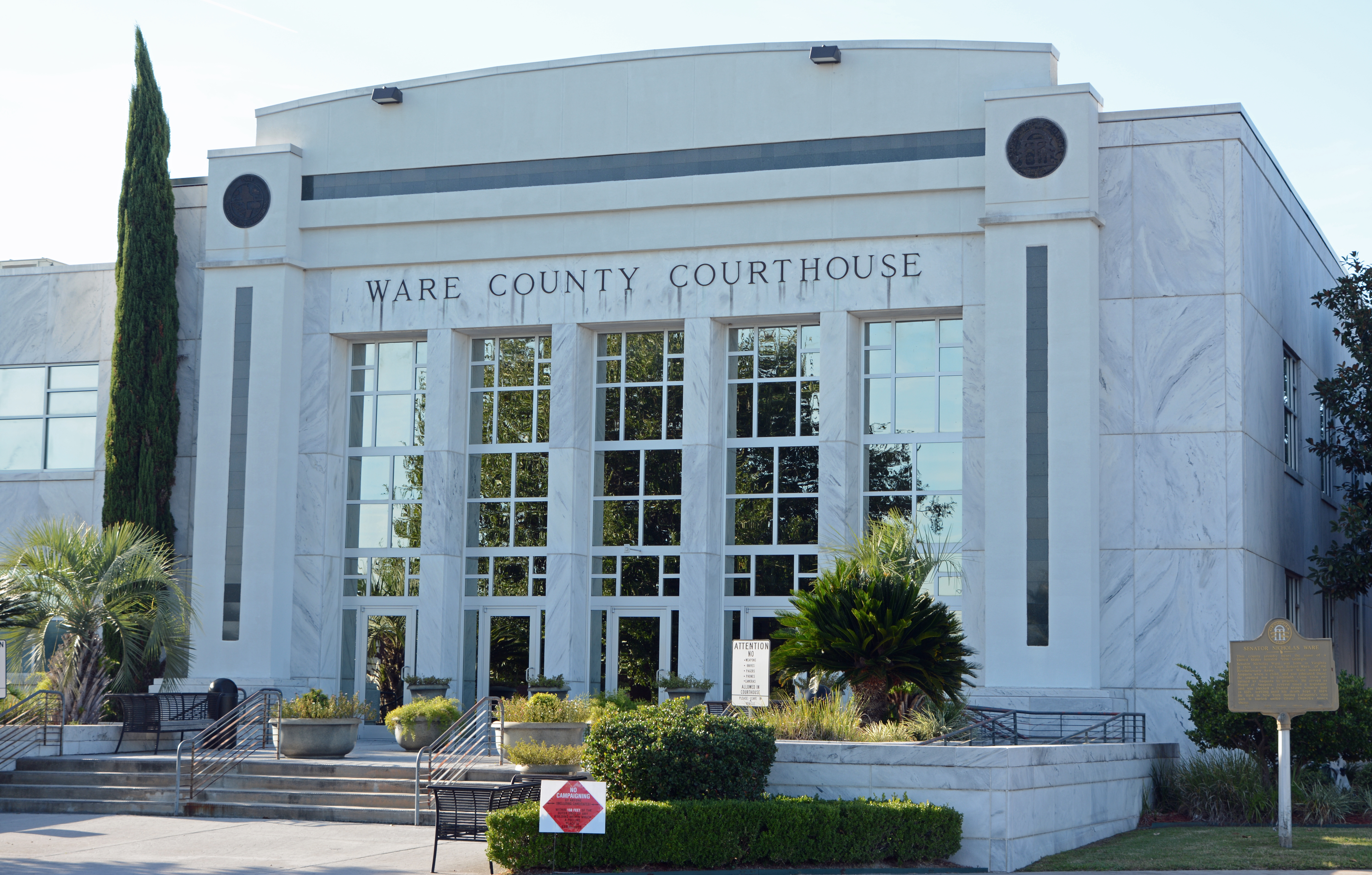
- Ware County Courthouse in Waycross
Interactive Map of Waycross, GA μSA
City of Waycross
Waycross, GA μSA
- Country: United States
- State: Georgia
- Principal city: Waycross
- Time zone: UTC−5 (EST)
  - Summer (DST): UTC−4 (EDT)

The Waycross Micropolitan Statistical Area (μSA), as defined by the United States Census Bureau, is an area consisting of two counties in Georgia, anchored by the city of Waycross.

As of the 2000 census, the μSA had a population of 51,119 (though a July 1, 2009 estimate placed the population at 54,494).

== Counties ==
- Pierce
- Ware

== Communities ==
- Incorporated places
  - Blackshear
  - Offerman
  - Patterson
  - Waycross (Principal city)
- Census-designated places (Note: All census-designated places are unincorporated)
  - Deenwood
  - Sunnyside
- Unincorporated places
  - Bristol
  - Dixie Union
  - Hacklebarney
  - Manor
  - Mershon
  - Millwood
  - Otter Creek
  - Ruskin
  - Sandy Bottom
  - Walkerville
  - Waresboro

== Demographics ==
As of the census of 2000, there were 51,119 people, 19,433 households, and 13,735 families residing within the μSA. The racial makeup of the μSA was 74.93% White, 22.78% African American, 0.20% Native American, 0.39% Asian, 0.04% Pacific Islander, 0.98% from other races, and 0.68% from two or more races. Hispanic or Latino of any race were 2.04% of the population.

The median income for a household in the μSA was $29,128, and the median income for a family was $35,138. Males had a median income of $27,621 versus $20,098 for females. The per capita income for the μSA was $14,307.

== See also ==
- Georgia census statistical areas
