= Jimmy Staten =

American football player (born 1991)

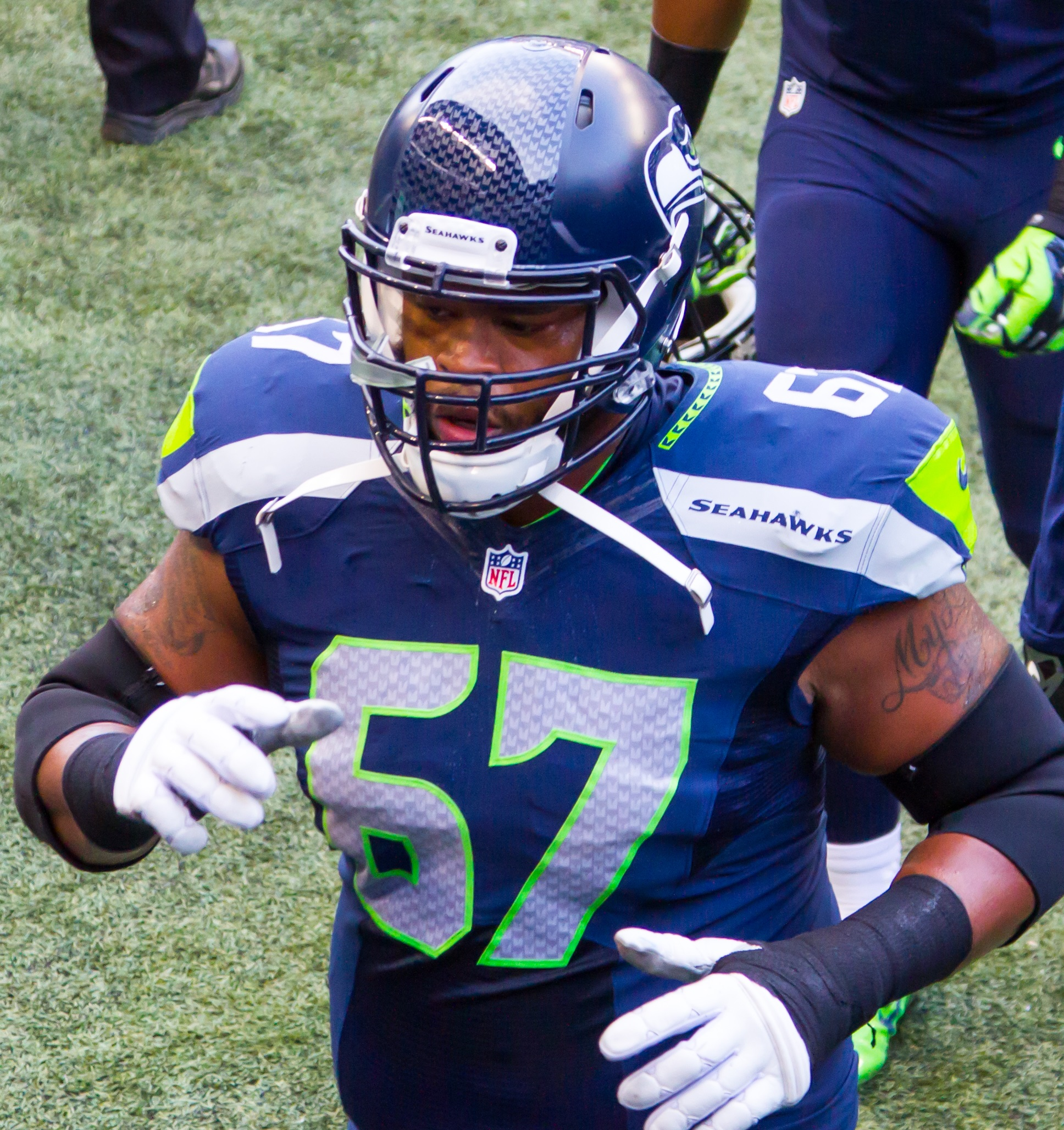
- Staten with the Seattle Seahawks in 2014

Profile
- Position: Defensive end

Personal information
- Born: May 4, 1991 (age 35)
- Listed height: 6 ft 4 in (1.93 m)
- Listed weight: 304 lb (138 kg)

Career information
- High school: Waycross (GA) Ware County
- College: Middle Tennessee (2009–2013)
- NFL draft: 2014: 5th round, 172nd overall pick

Career history
- Seattle Seahawks (2014–2015)*; New York Giants (2015)*; New England Patriots (2015)*; Kansas City Chiefs (2015–2016)*; Chicago Bears (2016); Atlanta Falcons (2016–2017)*; Tennessee Titans (2017)
- * Offseason or practice squad member only
- Stats at Pro Football Reference

Jimmy Lewis Staten IV (born May 4, 1991) is an American former football defensive end. He was selected by the Seattle Seahawks in the fifth round of the 2014 NFL draft. He played college football at Middle Tennessee.

== Early life ==
Staten was born on May 4, 1991, to Jimmy Staten III and Shirley Staten. He attended Ware County High School in Waycross, Georgia, where he was a two-way player in football. As a junior, Staten earned Class AAAA All-State honors as an offensive lineman from The Atlanta Journal-Constitution (AJC) and the Georgia Sports Writers Association. Even then, he was "seen as even more valuable" as a defensive end, according to The Florida Times-Union. As a senior, Staten posted 87 tackles and was voted one of the top 100 players in the South by The AJC. He was also selected to play in the 2008 Georgia Athletic Coaches Association (GACA) North/South All-Star Game as a member of the South squad. In addition to football, Staten lettered in track and field, reaching the state finals in the shot put. He verbally committed to playing college football at Middle Tennessee State University three weeks before signing his National Letter of Intent with the Blue Raiders on February 4, 2009.

== College career ==
As a freshman in 2009, Staten took a redshirt and was a member of the scout team. He appeared in 13 games in 2010, recording five tackles. The following season in 2011, Staten started all 12 games and tallied 29 tackles, four tackles for loss and a sack. He started all 12 games again in 2012, posting 36 tackles, 1.5 tackles for loss, a sack and a QB hurry.

In 2013, Staten was voted one of four team captains for the Blue Raiders. In 12 games played, he recorded 30 tackles, 1.5 tackles for loss, a pass breakup and two QB hurries in his final season. He earned All-Conference USA honorable mention honors and was invited to the NFLPA Collegiate Bowl.

== Professional career ==
Pre-draft measurables
Height	Weight	Arm length	Hand span	Wingspan	Vertical jump	Broad jump	Bench press
6 ft 4 1/2 in (1.94 m)	303 lb (137 kg)	33 1/2 in (0.85 m)	10 1/8 in (0.26 m)	6 ft 7 1/2 in (2.02 m)	27.0 in (0.69 m)	7 ft 10 in (2.39 m)	30 reps
All values from Pro Day

=== Seattle Seahawks ===
After being projected as a seventh round pick or free agent, Staten was selected by the Seattle Seahawks in the fifth round (172nd overall) of the 2014 NFL draft. Staten was sitting in his college graduation ceremony at Murphy Center when he received the phone call from Seattle indicating that they were going to draft him.

Staten was signed to a rookie contract with Seattle on May 16, 2014. On August 17, 2015, he was waived by the Seahawks.

=== New York Giants ===
On August 19, 2015, Staten was claimed off waivers by the New York Giants. On September 1, 2015, he was waived by the Giants.

=== New England Patriots ===
On September 7, 2015, the New England Patriots signed Staten to their practice squad. On September 16, 2015, he was released by the Patriots. He was re-signed to the practice squad on September 18.

=== Kansas City Chiefs ===
On September 30, 2015, Staten was signed to the Kansas City Chiefs' practice squad. On January 18, 2016, the Chiefs signed Staten to a future/reserve contract. On September 3, 2016, he was released by the Chiefs.

=== Chicago Bears ===
On September 14, 2016, Staten was signed to the Chicago Bears' practice squad. He was promoted to the active roster on November 19, 2016 but was released two days later and re-signed to the practice squad. He was released on December 27, 2016.

=== Atlanta Falcons ===
On January 17, 2017, Staten was signed to the Atlanta Falcons' practice squad. He signed a reserve/future contract with the Falcons on February 7, 2017. On April 26, 2017, Staten was waived by the Falcons.

=== Tennessee Titans ===
On May 15, 2017, Staten was signed by the Tennessee Titans. He was waived/injured on September 2, 2017 and placed on injured reserve. He was released on September 11, 2017.
