= Leodis McKelvin =

American football player (born 1985)

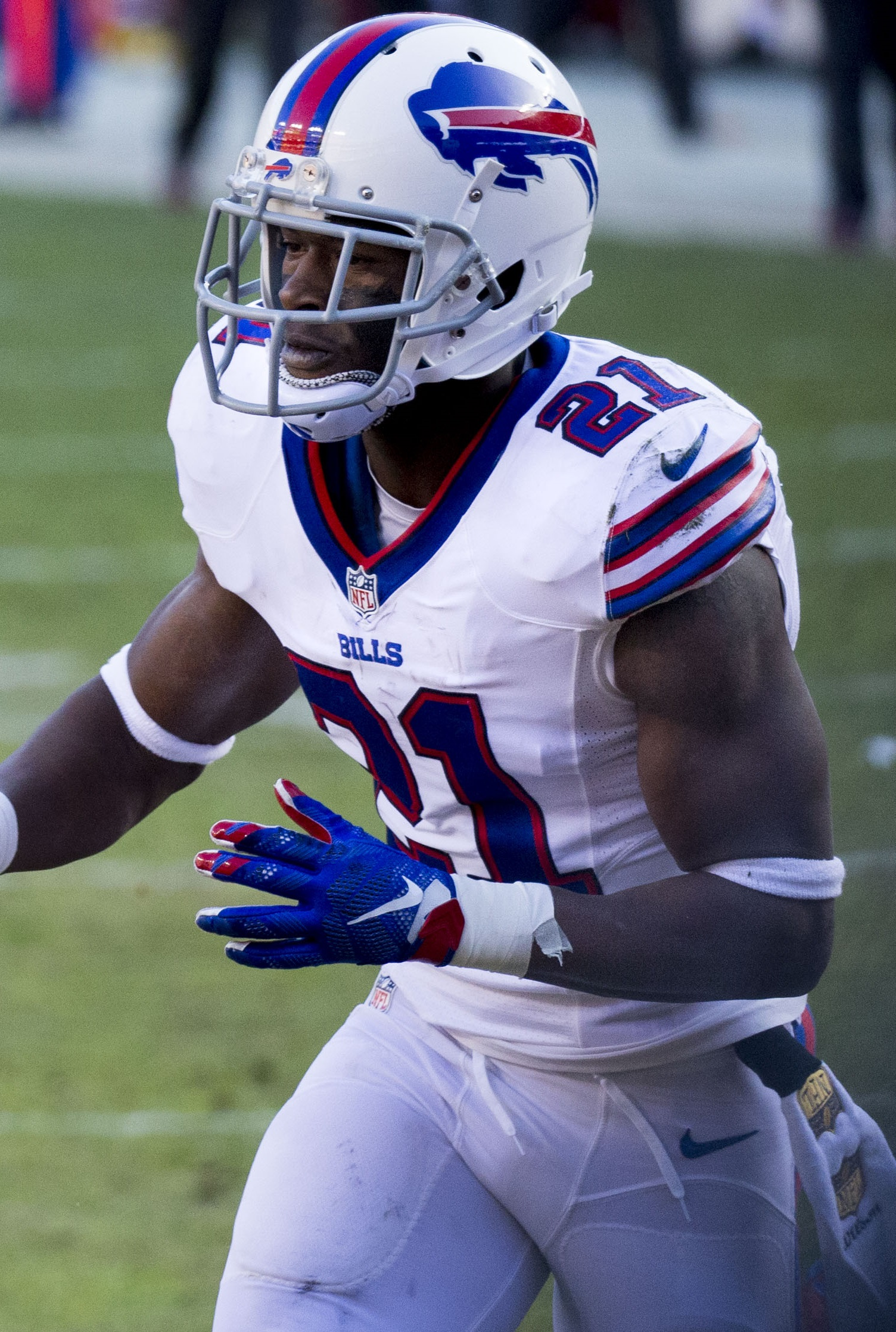
- McKelvin with the Buffalo Bills in 2015

No. 28, 21
- Position: Cornerback

Personal information
- Born: September 4, 1985 (age 41); Waycross, Georgia, U.S.
- Listed height: 5 ft 10 in (1.78 m)
- Listed weight: 185 lb (84 kg)

Career information
- High school: Ware County (Waycross)
- College: Troy (2004–2007)
- NFL draft: 2008: 1st round, 11th overall pick

Career history
- Buffalo Bills (2008–2015); Philadelphia Eagles (2016)

Awards and highlights
- First-team All-Pro (2008); PFWA All-Rookie Team (2008); First-team All-American (2007); 3× All-Sun Belt (2005–2007); Second-team All-Sun Belt (2004)

Career NFL statistics
- Total tackles: 360
- Forced fumbles: 4
- Interceptions: 15
- Pass deflections: 80
- Total return yards: 3,492
- Total touchdowns: 6
- Stats at Pro Football Reference

Leodis Anquan McKelvin (born September 4, 1985) is an American former professional football player who was a cornerback and return specialist in the National Football League (NFL). He played college football for the Troy Trojans, earning first-team All-American honors in 2007. He was selected by the Buffalo Bills in the first round of the 2008 NFL draft with the 11th overall pick.

== Early life ==
McKelvin attended Ware County High School in Waycross, Georgia, where he played cornerback for the Ware County Gators. As a junior, he recorded 60 tackles and six interceptions, while also returning eight receptions for over 300 yards. In his senior year, he recorded 51 tackles, recovered three fumbles, intercepted six passes and broke up six passes, while helping Ware to a 9–2 record, a regional title and a second-round AAAA playoff appearance in 2003. He was named defensive player of the year in the area as well as to the Georgia Times Union Super 11 team.

Considered only a two-star recruit by Rivals.com, McKelvin was not ranked among the nation's best cornerback prospects. He received only few scholarship offers and picked Troy over Louisville on January 30, 2004.

== College career ==
McKelvin enrolled in Troy University, where he played for the Troy Trojans football team from 2004 to 2007. As a true freshman, McKelvin saw action in all 12 games as a return man and reserve in the secondary, averaging 11.7 yards per punt return and 21.9 yards per kickoff return for the season. In his sophomore year, he earned first-team All-Sun Belt Conference honors as a return man by averaging 25.8 yards per kickoff return and 12.6 yards on punt returns. At cornerback, McKelvin was credited with 30 tackles, including 26 solo stops, one sack, a fumble recovery and five pass breakups.

His junior year was his first season as a regular cover corner, as he recorded 66 tackles on the year, including 56 solo stops, while starting all 13 games. McKelvin was credited with one tackle for loss during the season, had two forced fumbles, two quarterback hurries and seven pass breakups. As a senior, he returned three punts for touchdowns. He was named All-Sun Belt in both his junior and senior year as well.

== Professional career ==
=== Pre-draft ===
Prior to the draft, McKelvin was compared to Johnathan Joseph.

Pre-draft measurables
| Height | Weight | 40-yard dash | 10-yard split | 20-yard split | 20-yard shuttle | Three-cone drill | Vertical jump | Broad jump | Bench press |
|---|---|---|---|---|---|---|---|---|---|
| 5 ft 10 1/8 in (1.78 m) | 184 lb (83 kg) | 4.39 s | 1.50 s | 2.52 s | 4.10 s | 7.07 s | 40 1/2 in (1.03 m) | 10 ft 5 in (3.18 m) | 18 reps |
All values from NFL Combine

=== Buffalo Bills ===
==== 2008 ====
McKelvin was selected by the Buffalo Bills 11th overall in the 2008 NFL draft, the first cornerback selected.

On July 26, 2008, McKelvin signed a five-year, $19.4 million contract with the Bills with up to $12.6 million in bonuses. McKelvin made an immediate impact with his kick returning skills, returning a kickoff 95-yards for a touchdown in a preseason game against the Pittsburgh Steelers.

Although he showed promise during the pre-season, he began his rookie season as the fifth cornerback on the depth chart. He would see his first action on September 28, 2008, during a game against the St. Louis Rams and finished his regular season debut with two tackles. He earned his first career start on November 9 during a 20–10 loss to the New England Patriots.

On November 17, 2008, on Monday Night Football, he returned a kickoff 98-yards for a touchdown against the Cleveland Browns. The following week on Sunday on the road against the Kansas City Chiefs, McKelvin intercepted Tyler Thigpen twice, returning one for a 64-yard touchdown. The Bills went on to win the game 54–31. After his two interception game and an injury to cornerback Jabari Greer, McKelvin remained a starting cornerback for the last six games and finished his first season with 32 total tackles, five pass deflections, two interceptions, and a single touchdown. He was named to the NFL All-Rookie Team.

==== 2009 ====
After Jabari Greer left via free agency during the 2009 offseason, McKelvin was named the starting cornerback opposite Terrence McGee to begin the season.

On September 14, 2009, during the Bills' season opener on Monday Night Football, McKelvin caught a kickoff in his own endzone with Buffalo up 24–19 over the New England Patriots and 2:06 left in the game. He chose to return it instead of downing it and fumbled it around the 30-yard line, making it his second fumble of the game. New England drove from the 31-yard line for the winning touchdown. As a result, two teenage males vandalized the Hamburg, New York, home of McKelvin spray-painting obscenities as well as the phrase "take a knee" and the winning score of 25–24 in favor of New England on his front lawn. McKelvin chose not to press charges against the two teenage males.

On September 27, 2009, McKelvin suffered a broken fibula during a 27–7 loss to the New Orleans Saints. He was placed on injured-reserve four days later, effectively ending his season. In three starts, he earned 11 tackles and a pass deflection.

==== 2010 ====
McKelvin began the season as the third cornerback on the depth chart after Drayton Florence performed well after replacing him during his injury the previous season. He made his return on September 12, 2010, in the season opener against the Miami Dolphins and finished the 15–10 loss with three tackles and two pass deflections. On September 26 he received his first start of the season against the New England Patriots and finished with five total tackles. During a Week 5 contest against the Jacksonville Jaguars, McKelvin collected a season-high eight tackles during the Bills 36–26 loss. On December 5, 2010, he had his first interception of the season and also made seven tackles and a pass deflection during a 38–14 loss to the Minnesota Vikings. The following week, he made a second consecutive interception during a Week 14 victory over the Cleveland Browns. He finished his third season with 62 combined tackles, 11 pass deflections, a forced fumble, and two interceptions in 14 starts and appeared in all 16 regular season games while the Buffalo Bills finished 4–12 in their first season under head coach Chan Gailey.

==== 2011 ====
The Bills began their season with a 3–0 record with McKelvin as one of their starting cornerbacks. On September 25, 2012, McKelvin recorded his only interception of the season and made six tackles in a 34–31 victory over the New England Patriots. The following game, he gave up four receptions and 118 yards to A. J. Green as the Bills suffered their first loss of the season to the Cincinnati Bengals. He was demoted to third string after giving up over 100-yards during the Bills Week 5 win over the Philadelphia Eagles. He was given punt return duties for the rest of the season beginning on November 27 against the New York Jets. On December 24, 2011, McKelvin returned a punt return for an 80-yard touchdown against the Denver Broncos. McKelvin finished the season with 39 total tackles, eight pass deflections, and one interception while appearing in all 16 games with six starts. After starting 3–0 the Bills lost nine of their last 11 games and finished with a 6–10 record.

==== 2012 ====
To begin the season, he was the third cornerback on the depth chart behind Aaron Williams and rookie Stephon Gilmore but continued to handle punt and kick return duties. On September 16, 2012, McKelvin returned a punt for an 88-yard touchdown during the Bill's 35–17 victory over the Kansas City Chiefs. The following week, he intercepted his first pass of the season and also made a tackle and a pass deflection against the Cleveland Browns. On November 11, 2012, McKelvin received his first start of the season in place on an injured Aaron Williams. He finished the game with four tackles and a pass deflection while the Bills lost 37–31 to the New England Patriots. Four days later, he returned a punt for a 79-yard touchdown against the Miami Dolphins on Thursday Night Football. For his game against Miami, he earned AFC Special Teams Player of the Week. He finished the season with 21 tackles and an interception in four starts and 13 games.

==== 2013 ====
On March 9, 2013, McKelvin re-signed with the Bills on a four-year, $20 million contract with $7.5 million in guaranteed money. He began the season as a starting punt returner and cornerback after Aaron Williams was switched to strong safety. During the season opener against the New England Patriots, McKelvin finished with a total of six tackles and four pass deflections as the Bills lost 23–21. On December 1, 2013, he finished with a career-high ten tackles and two pass deflections during a 34–31 overtime loss to the Atlanta Falcons in Toronto. He intercepted his only pass of the season during a Week 16 matchup against the Miami Dolphins. McKelvin finished his first season under new head coach Doug Marrone with 60 total tackles and 19 deflected passes in 15 total games and 13 starts.

==== 2014 ====
McKelvin started the 2014 season with a career-high 13 solo tackles and forced a fumble during a 23–20 victory over the Chicago Bears. The following week against the Miami Dolphins, he made his first interception of the season and made three tackles during their 29–10 victory. On October 19, he intercepted two passes off quarterback Teddy Bridgewater in the 17–16 victory over the Minnesota Vikings. On November 13, 2014, McKelvin suffered a broken ankle against the Dolphins. It required surgery and he was placed on injured-reserve for the rest of the season. He finished the season with 48 combined tackles, eight pass deflections, and a career-high four interceptions in nine starts and ten games.

==== 2015 ====
He suffered a setback during his recovery and most of his training camp was spent on the sideline with his ankle in a cast. On September 4, 2015, he was placed on the Reserve/Non-Football Injury list, which required him to sit out at least the first six weeks of the 2015 season. He was activated to the 53-man roster on November 7. He made his first start of the season the following day against the Miami Dolphins and finished the game with six solo tackles. On December 13, 2015, he made his first interception of the season off of Philadelphia Eagles quarterback Sam Bradford. He finished his first and only season under new head coach Rex Ryan with 32 total tackles, nine pass deflections, and two interceptions.

On March 4, 2016, the Bills released McKelvin.

=== Philadelphia Eagles ===
McKelvin signed with the Philadelphia Eagles on March 8, 2016, reuniting with the defensive coordinator Jim Schwartz, who was with Buffalo in 2014. His contract was for two-years for $6.2 million. with $3 million guaranteed and a signing bonus of $500,000. He played in 13 games with 12 starts for the Eagles in 2016, recording 43 tackles, 16 passes defensed and two interceptions including one returned 29 yards for a touchdown in Week 14 against the Washington Redskins in a 27–22 loss.

On February 8, 2017, McKelvin was released by the Eagles.

== NFL career statistics ==
| Year | Team | GP | Comb | Solo | Asst | Sacks | FF | FR | Yds | Int | Yds | Avg | Lng | TD | PD |
|---|---|---|---|---|---|---|---|---|---|---|---|---|---|---|---|
| 2008 | BUF | 16 | 32 | 26 | 6 | 0.0 | 1 | 1 | 0 | 2 | 64 | 32 | 64 | 1 | 5 |
| 2009 | BUF | 3 | 11 | 8 | 3 | 0.0 | 0 | 0 | 0 | 0 | 0 | 0 | 0 | 0 | 1 |
| 2010 | BUF | 16 | 62 | 53 | 9 | 0.0 | 1 | 0 | 0 | 2 | 10 | 5 | 10 | 0 | 11 |
| 2011 | BUF | 16 | 39 | 31 | 8 | 0.0 | 0 | 2 | 0 | 1 | 21 | 21 | 21 | 0 | 8 |
| 2012 | BUF | 13 | 21 | 20 | 1 | 0.0 | 0 | 0 | 0 | 1 | 9 | 9 | 9 | 0 | 3 |
| 2013 | BUF | 15 | 72 | 60 | 12 | 0.0 | 1 | 0 | 0 | 1 | 0 | 0 | 0 | 0 | 19 |
| 2014 | BUF | 10 | 48 | 45 | 3 | 0.0 | 1 | 0 | 0 | 4 | 10 | 2.5 | 9 | 0 | 9 |
| 2015 | BUF | 9 | 32 | 25 | 7 | 0.0 | 0 | 0 | 0 | 2 | 0 | 0 | 0 | 0 | 9 |
| 2016 | PHI | 13 | 43 | 32 | 11 | 0.0 | 0 | 0 | 0 | 2 | 29 | 14.5 | 29 | 1 | 16 |
| Career | | 111 | 360 | 300 | 60 | 0.0 | 4 | 3 | 0 | 15 | 143 | 16 | 64 | 2 | 80 |
