= Yonah, Georgia =

Census-designated place in White County, Georgia, United States

- Census-designated place Unincorporated Community
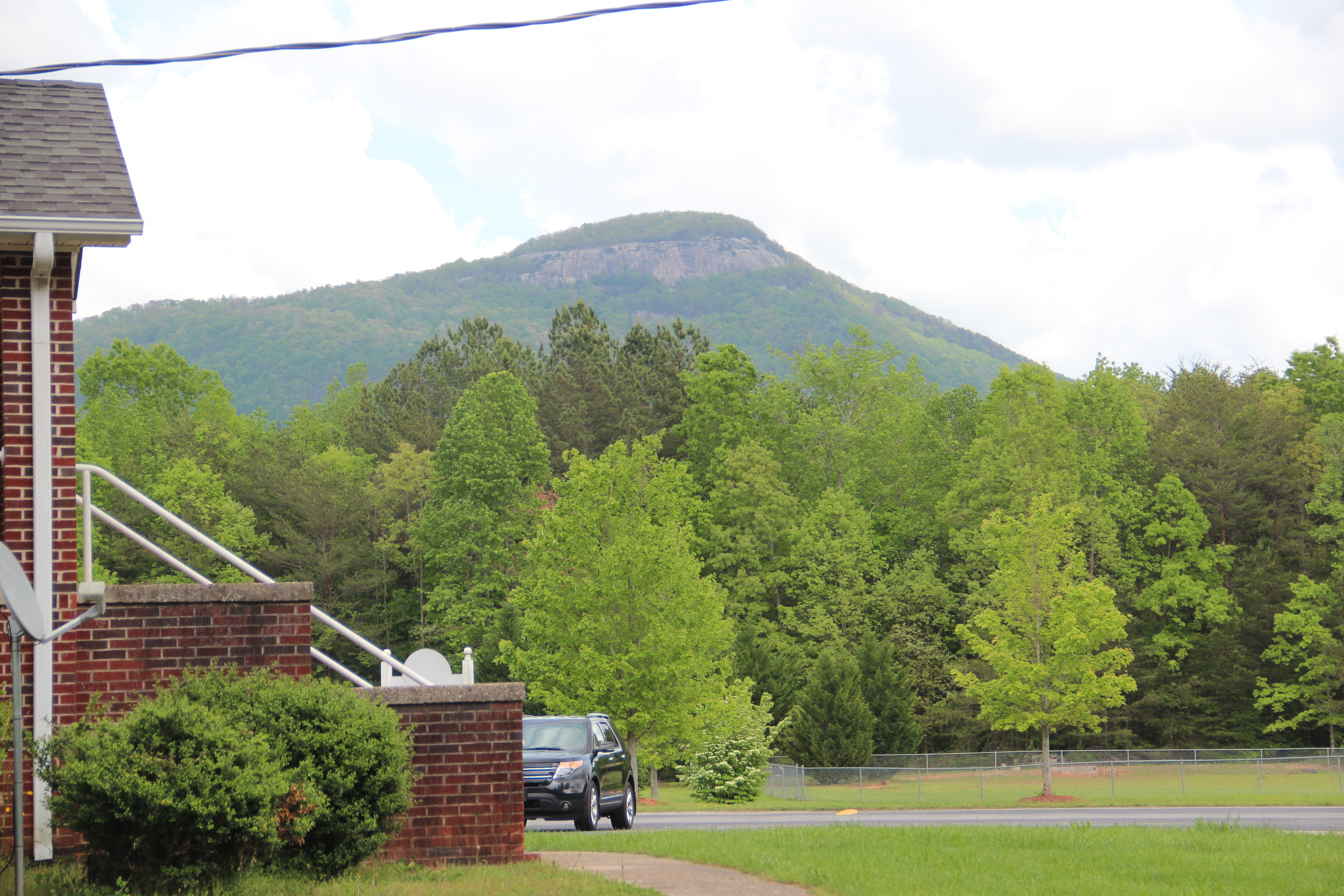
- Yonah Mountain viewed from Mount Yonah Baptist Church

- Location within Georgia
- Coordinates: 34°38′28″N 83°45′13″W
- Country: United States
- State: Georgia
- County: White

Area
  - Total: 3.15 sq mi (8.17 km^{2})
  - Land: 3.13 sq mi (8.10 km^{2})
  - Water: 0.027 sq mi (0.07 km^{2})
- Elevation: 1,595 ft (486 m)

Population (2020)
  - Total: 657
  - Density: 210.1/sq mi (81.13/km^{2})
- Time zone: UTC-5 (Eastern (EST))
  - Summer (DST): UTC-4 (EDT)
- Area codes: 706 & 762
- GNIS feature ID: 2587050

Yonah is an unincorporated community and census-designated place (CDP) in White County, Georgia, United States. It first appeared as a CDP in the 2010 census. Its population was 657 as of the 2020 census. Georgia State Route 75 passes through the community.

== History ==
Yonah is a name derived from the Cherokee language meaning "bear".

== Demographics ==
Yonah first appeared as a census designated place in the 2010 United States census.

Historical population
Census	Pop.	Note	%±
2010	507		—
2020	657		29.6%
U.S. Decennial Census; 2010 2020

Yonah CDP, Georgia – Racial and ethnic composition Note: the US Census treats Hispanic/Latino as an ethnic category. This table excludes Latinos from the racial categories and assigns them to a separate category. Hispanics/Latinos may be of any race.
Race / ethnicity (NH = Non-Hispanic)	Pop 2010	Pop 2020	% 2010	% 2020
White alone (NH)	485	590	95.66%	89.80%
Black or African American alone (NH)	3	9	0.59%	1.37%
Native American or Alaska Native alone (NH)	6	4	1.18%	0.61%
Asian alone (NH)	0	0	0.00%	0.00%
Pacific Islander alone (NH)	0	0	0.00%	0.00%
Some Other Race alone (NH)	0	2	0.00%	0.30%
Mixed Race or Multi-Racial (NH)	8	33	1.58%	5.02%
Hispanic or Latino (any race)	5	19	0.99%	2.89%
Total	507	657	100.00%	100.00%

== See also ==
- List of census-designated places in Georgia (U.S. state)
