= Obediah Barber Homestead =

Historic house in Georgia, United States

- Barber, Obediah, Homestead
- U.S. National Register of Historic Places
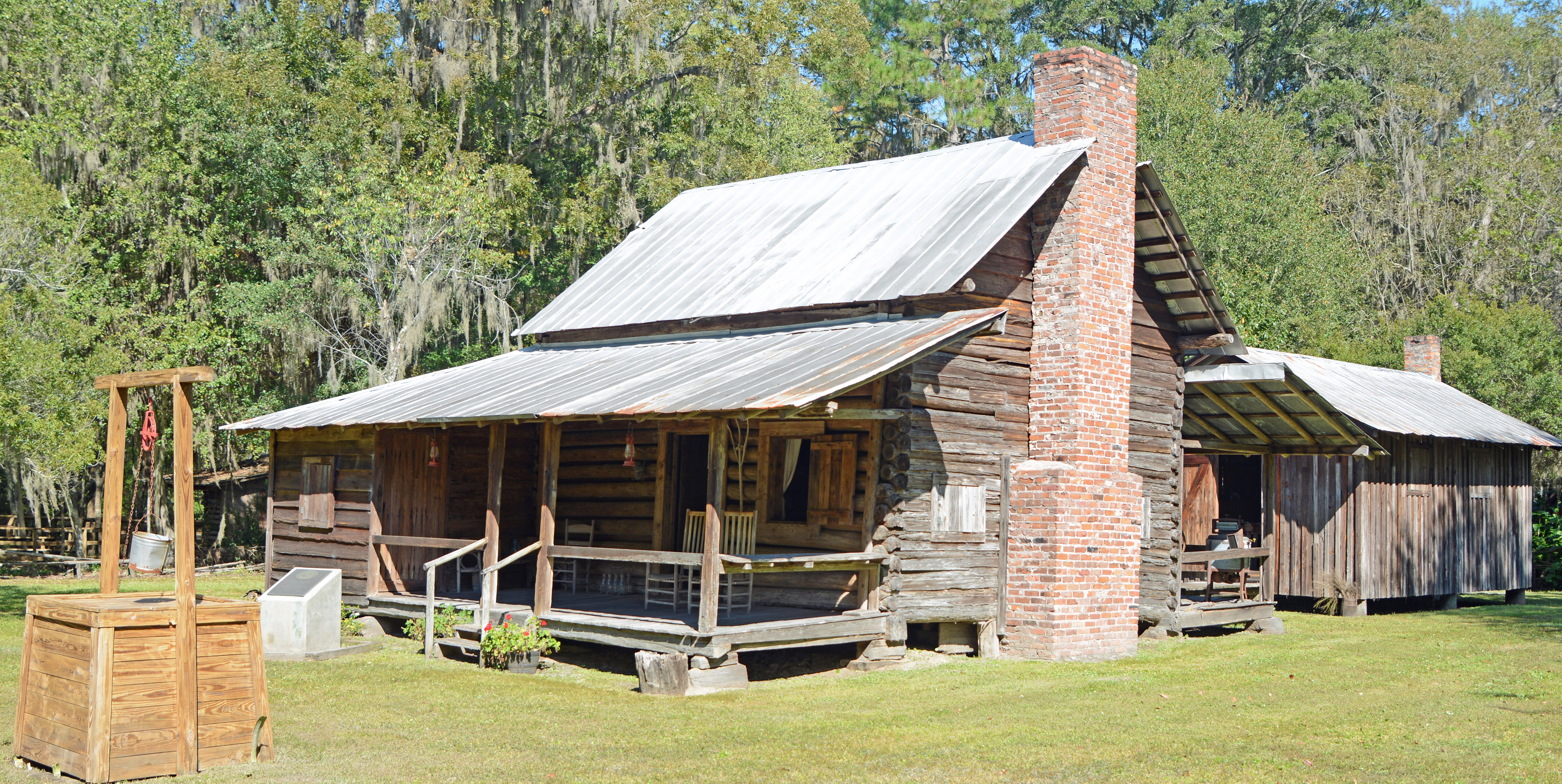
- Main house, kitchen, and well

- Location within Georgia Location within the United States
- Nearest city: Waycross, Georgia
- Coordinates: 31°5′25″N 82°20′45″W
- Area: less than one acre
- Built: 1870
- Architectural style: Single Pen
- NRHP reference No.: 95000742
- Added to NRHP: June 20, 1995

The Obediah Barber Homestead is a late-19th century homestead of Obediah Barber (1825-1909). The homestead was built in 1870 and is near the northern edge of the Okefenokee Swamp in Ware County, Georgia, 7 miles south of Waycross, Georgia. Barber, who was known as the "King of the Swamp", was a great explorer of the swamp. The main house, the detached kitchen, and the well were added to the National Register of Historic Places in 1995.

== Today ==
Today the site is run as a museum to show typical life of the late 1800s in the area. There are over 20 structures, but none of them are original except the main house and the kitchen. The site features a large collection of pre-mechanical farming equipment and a moonshine still. It contains a nature trail and few animals.

== Photos ==
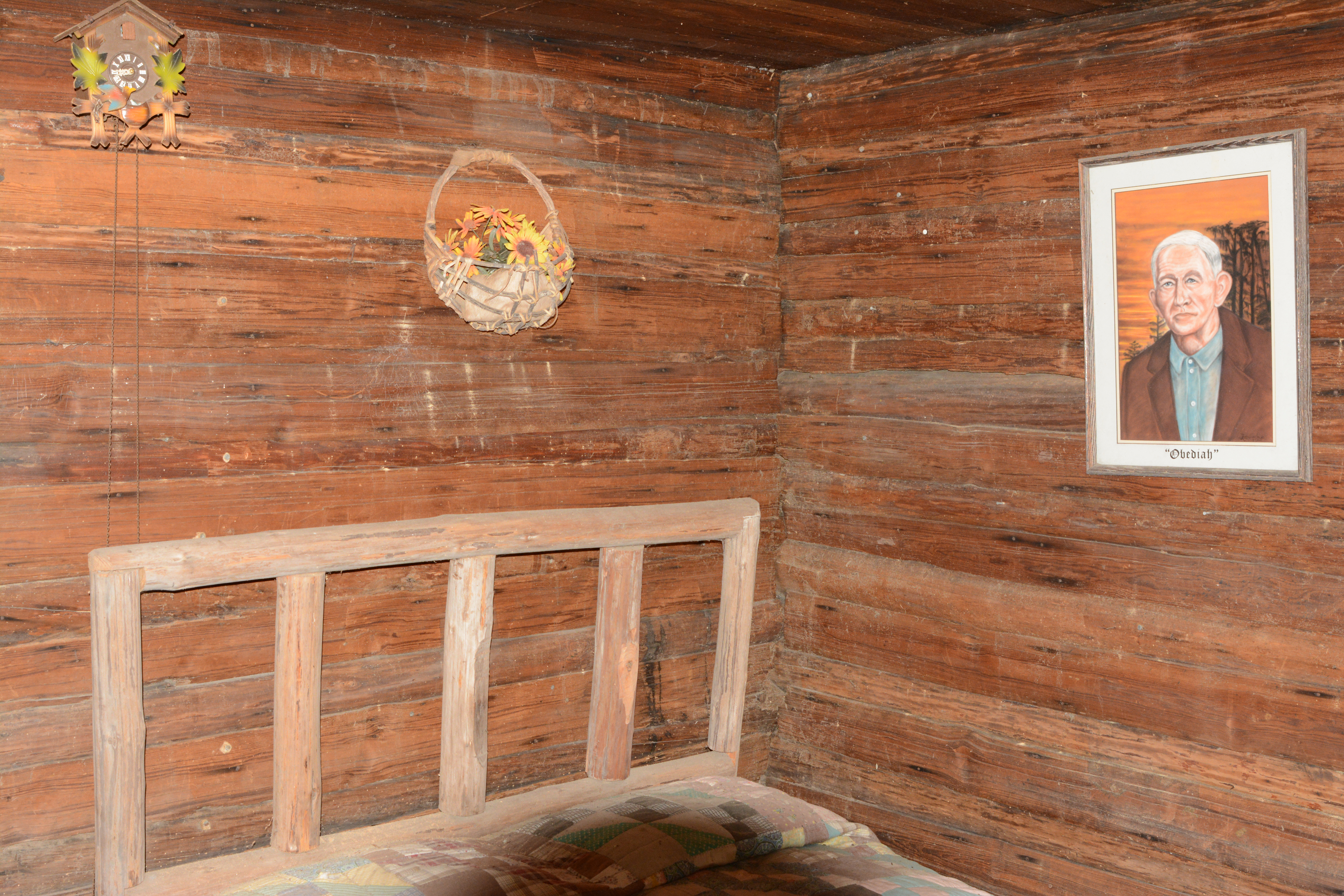
Inside

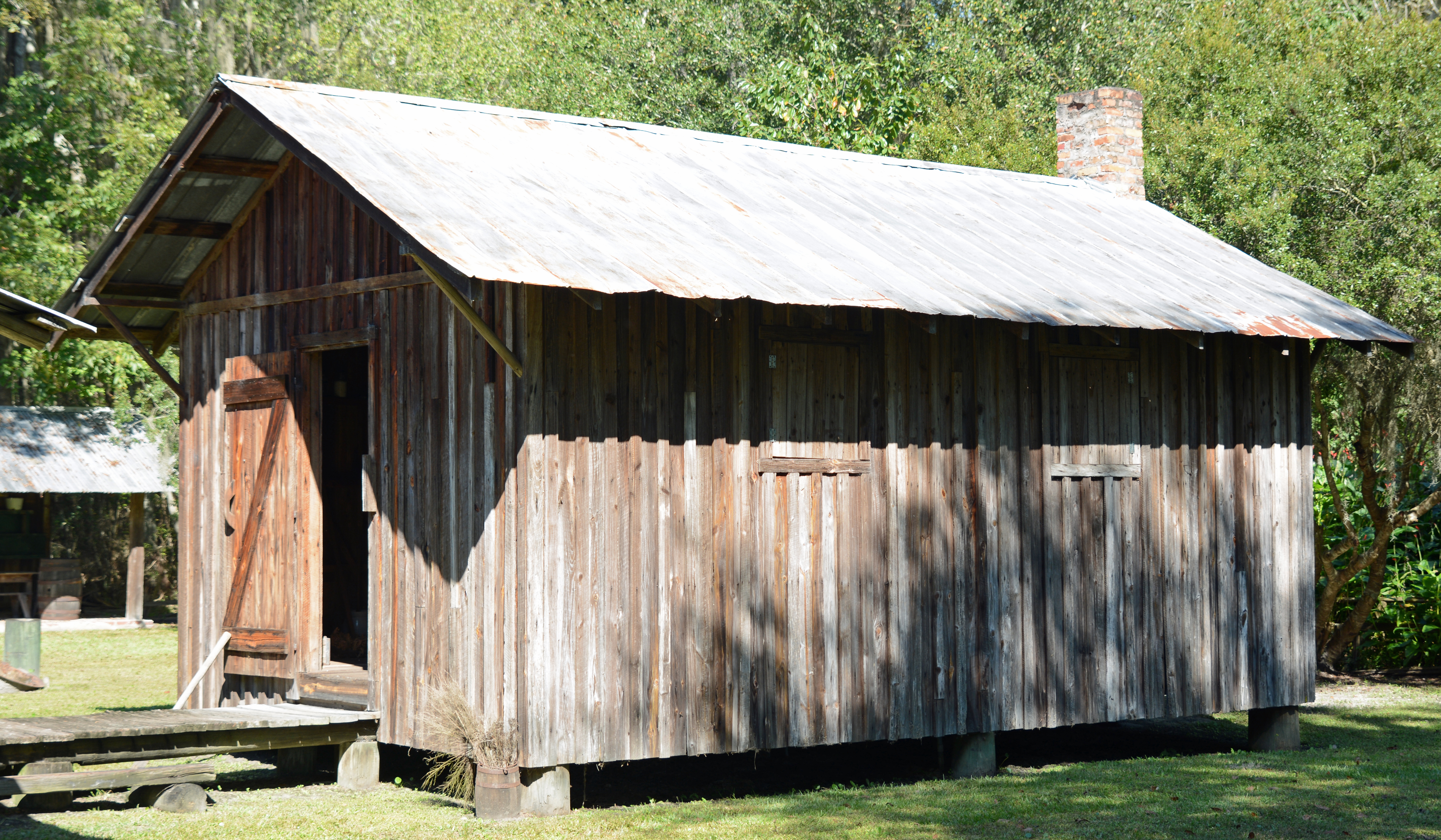
Detached kitchen (for fire safety)

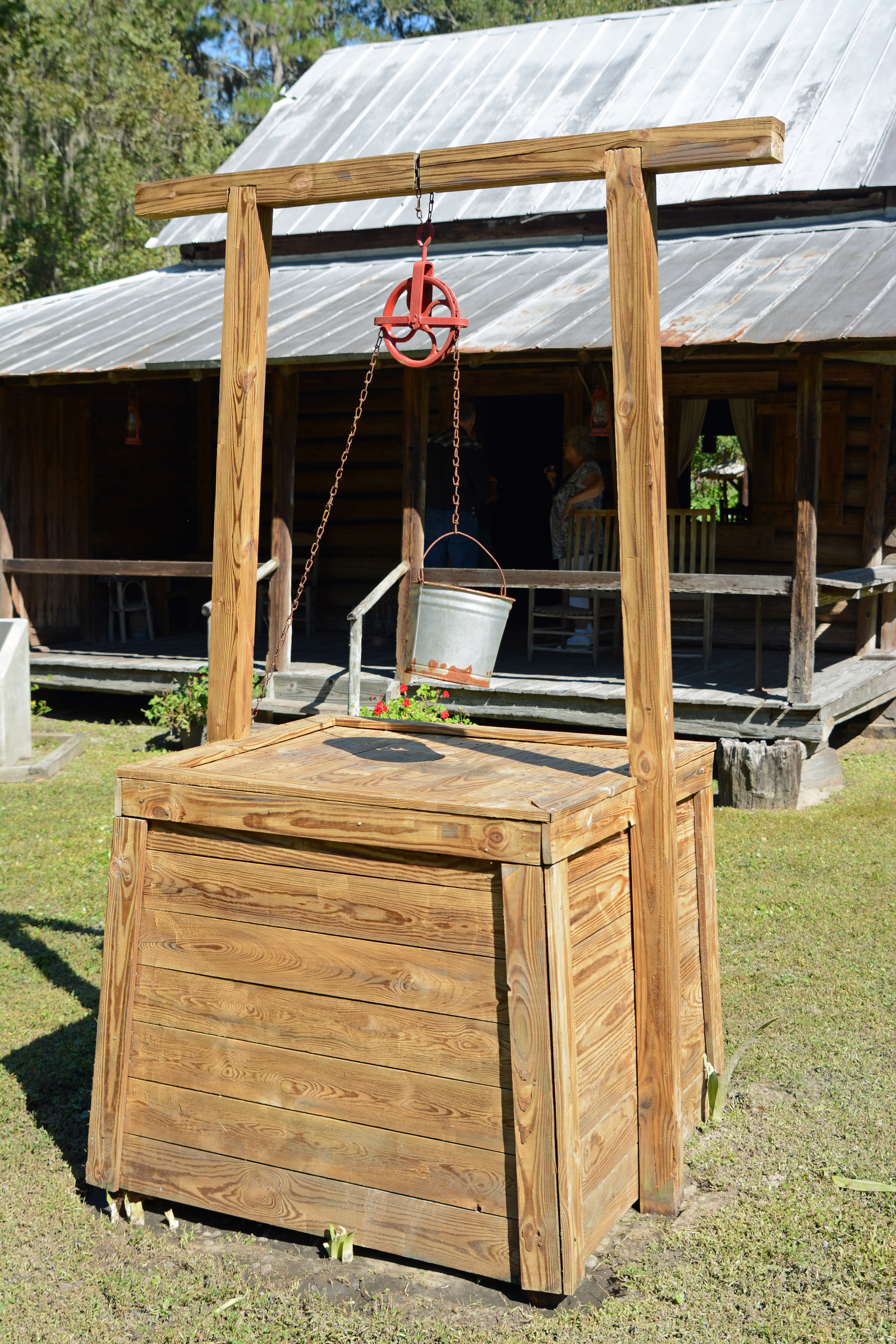
Well

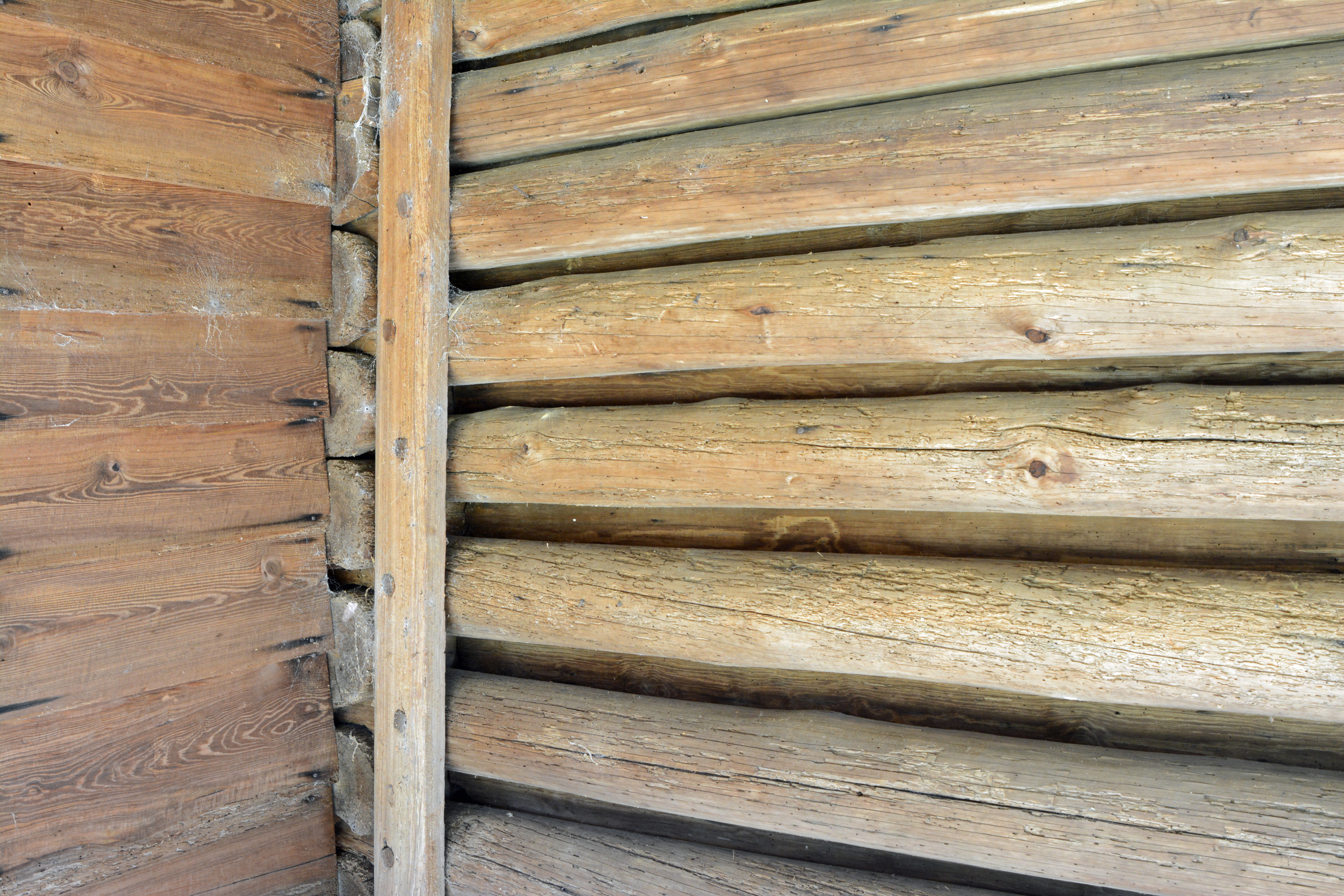
Log details

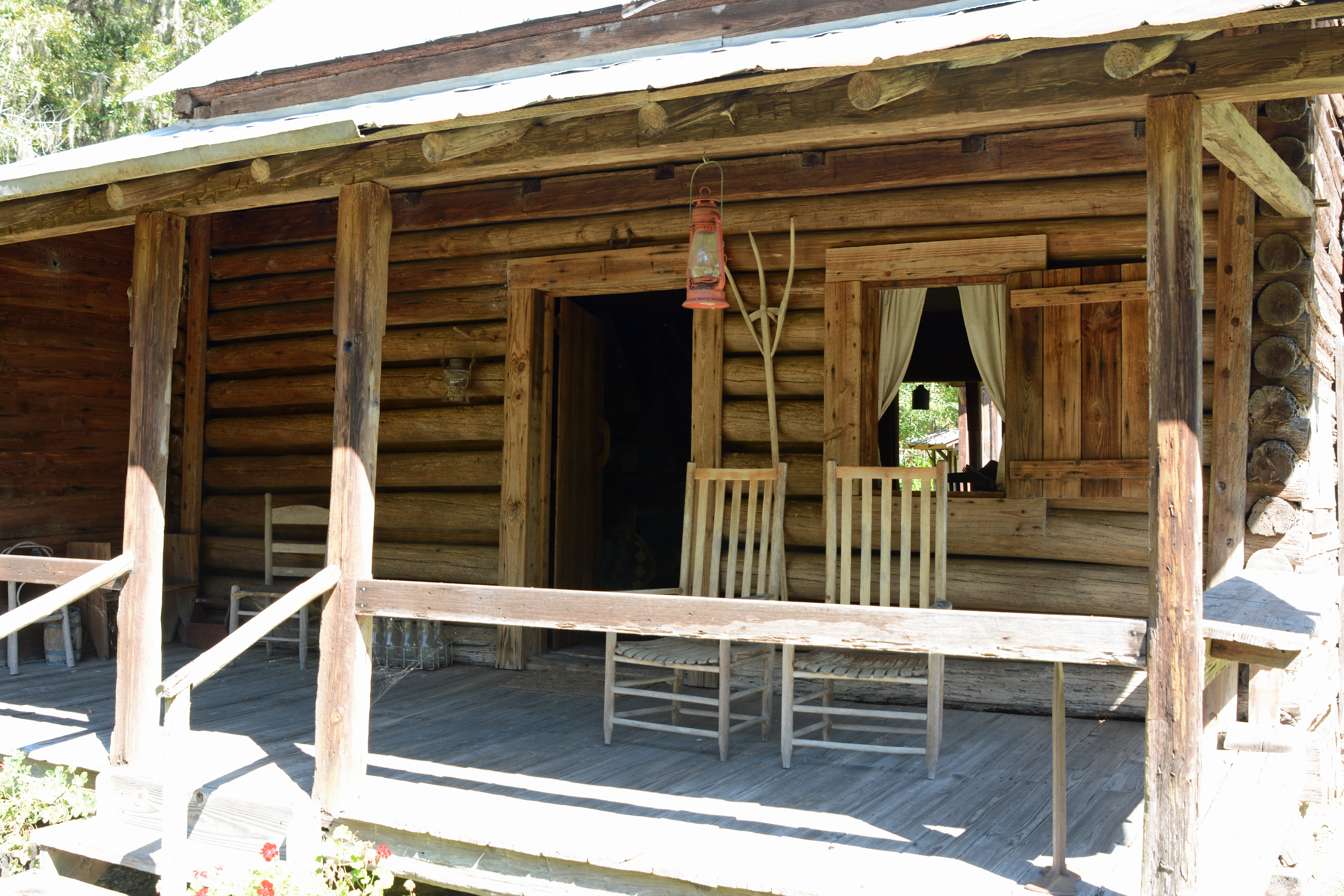
Porch

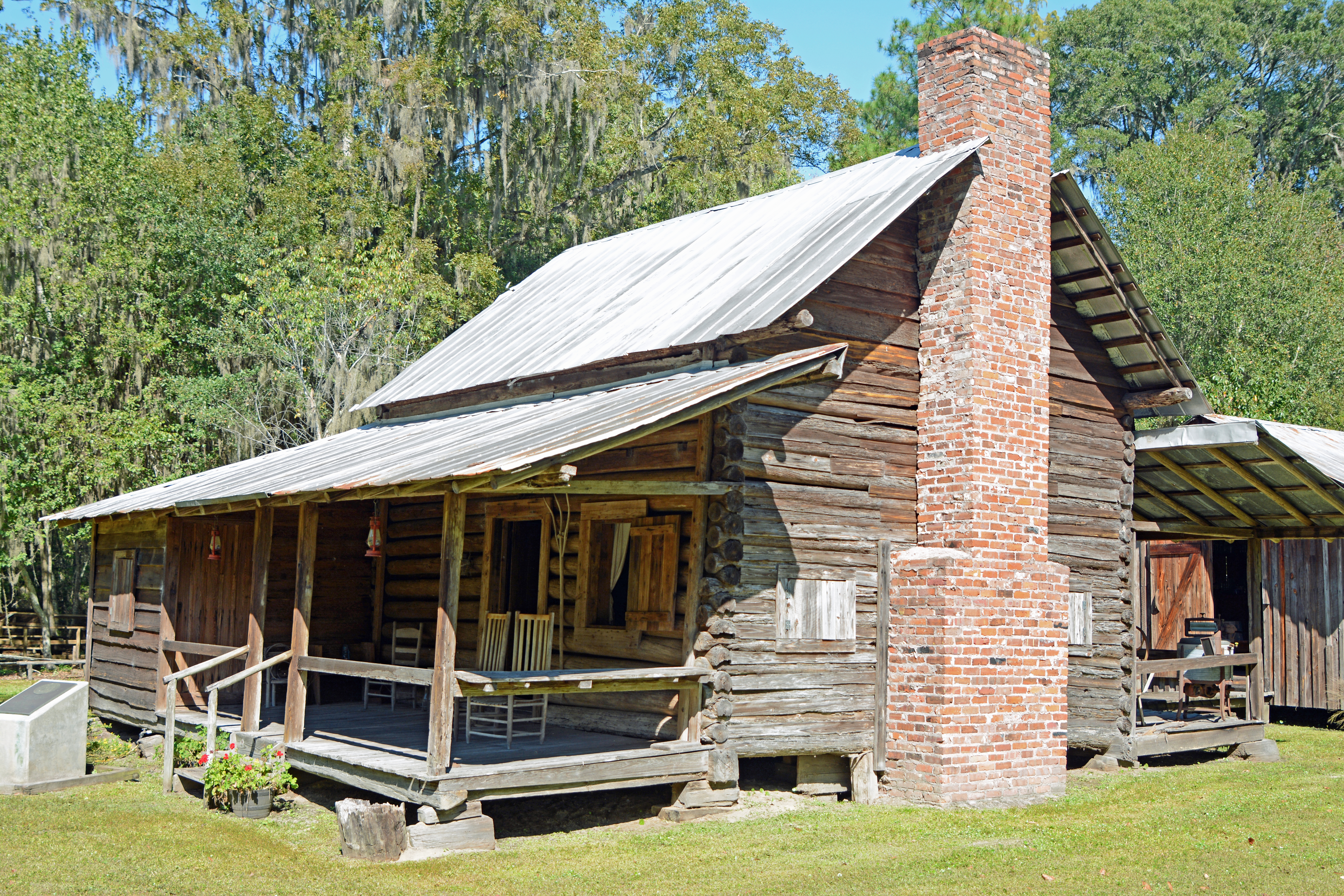
Main house

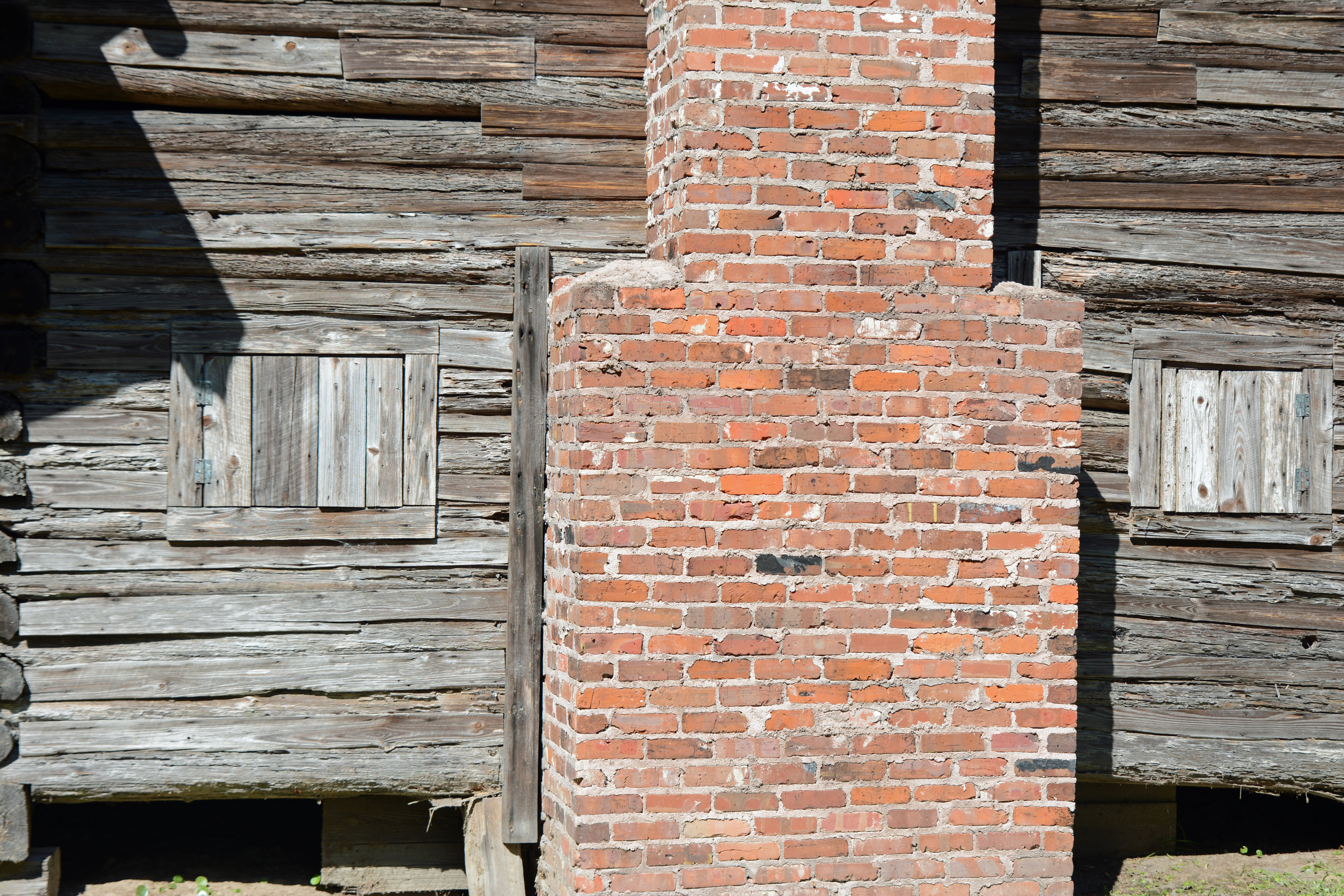
Side details
