= Ruskin, Georgia =

Unincorporated community in Georgia, US

Ruskin is an unincorporated community in Ware County, Georgia, United States. It lies between Waycross and Manor on U.S. Route 84. The community is part of the Waycross Micropolitan Statistical Area.

== History ==
Ruskin was established in the 1890s, and was named after John Ruskin, a Victorian art critic. A post office called Ruskin was established in 1899, and remained in operation until 1932.

The Old Ruskin Church was built around 1895.
