= Ware County High School =

Public high school in Waycross, Georgia, United States

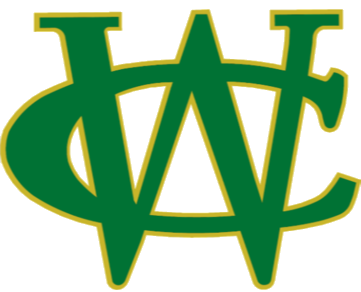

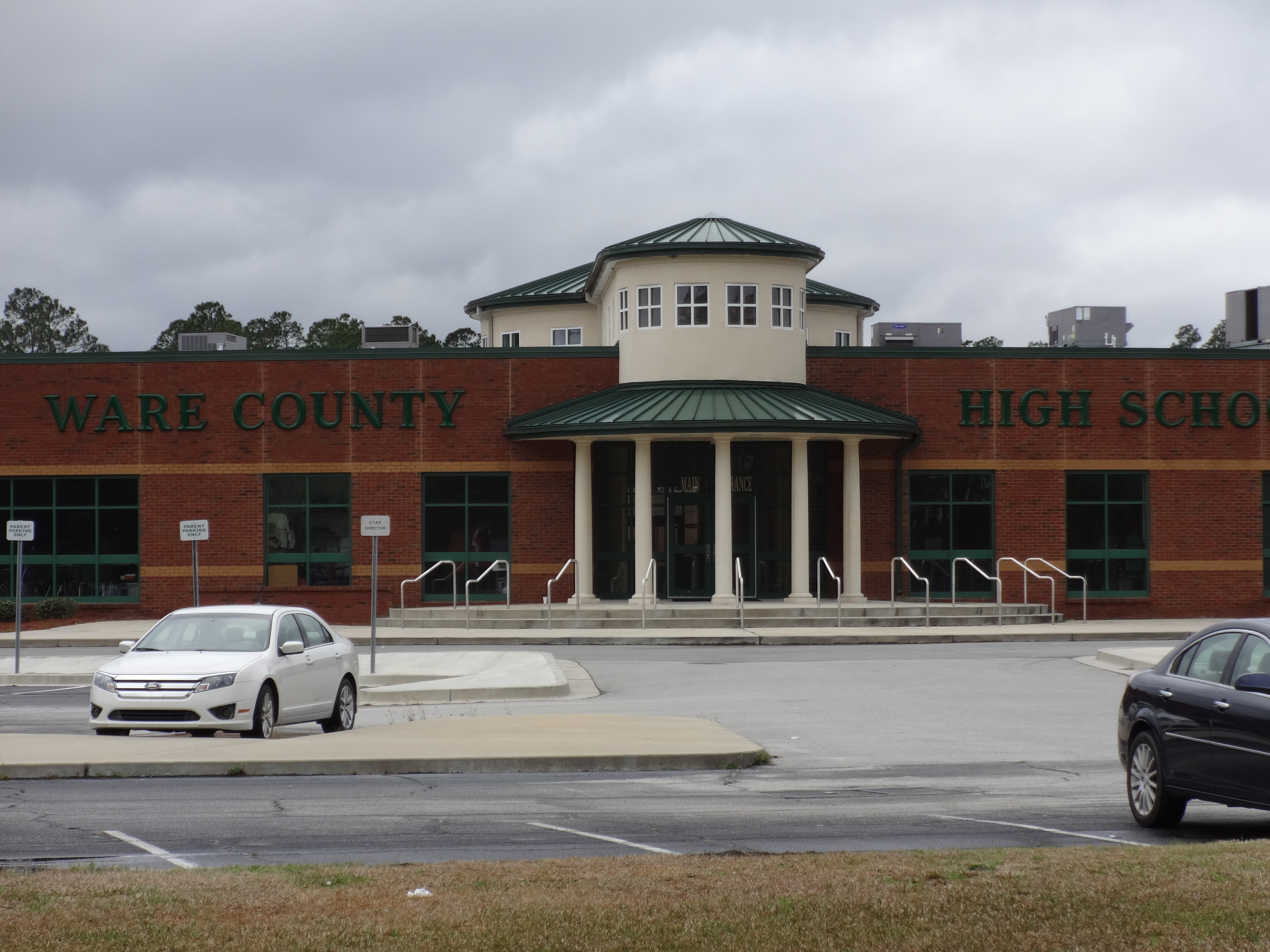
- Ware County High School in 2015

Location
- 700 Victory Drive; Waycross, Georgia 31503-8856; United States; 31.202°N 82.383°W

Information
- Type: Public
- Established: 1958
- School district: Ware County School District
- Principal: Buford Kellogg
- Teaching staff: 116.90 (FTE)
- Grades: 9–12
- Enrollment: 1,618 (2023–2024)
- Student to teacher ratio: 13.84
- Colors: Green and Gold
- Athletics conference: GHSA Class AAAAA Region 1
- Mascot: Gator
- Team name: Gators
- Rivals: Coffee High School
- Yearbook: Echo
- Website: ware.k12.ga.us/ware-county-high-school

Ware County High School is the only public high school in Ware County, Georgia, United States. It is located in the city of Waycross.

== History ==
Ware County High School was formed in 1958 by the merging of Waresboro High School and Wacona High Schools. Expansion occurred in 1993 when the Waycross City Schools dropped their charter and Waycross High was absorbed by Ware County Senior High. In 1994, the doors were opened to a new high school in Ware County. It is located on Victory Drive, and is home to more than 1500 students and 110 faculty members.

== Sports offered ==
- Baseball
- Basketball
- Competitive cheerleading
- Cross country
- Drill team
- Football
- Golf
- Raiders (dissolved for the 2020–2021 school year - reinstated 2021–2022 school year)
- Rifle
- Soccer
- Softball
- Swimming
- Tennis
- Track
- Volleyball
- Wrestling

== Sports history ==
The Ware County Gators high school football team made it to the state AAAA championship game during the 2007 season and the AAAAA championship game during the 2012 season. The Gators lost 20–14 to Northside Warner Robins High School Eagles in 2007 and lost 49–13 to the Gainesville High School Red Elephants in 2012. They challenged Charlie Grisham's Carrollton Trojans for the 1961 A championship, but lost 21–0. It was a rare weekend in that their cross-town rivals, the Waycross Bulldogs, had won the AA State Championship the night before, defeating Rossville 23–7. Head coach Jason Strickland lead the Gators to a GHSA Class 5A state championship in 2022 over the Warner Robins Demons 38-13.

The Gators play at Memorial Stadium.

=== State Championships ===
- Girls' Basketball (1) – 1964 (2A)
- Girls' Golf (1) – 2015 (5A), 2022 (5A)
- Riflery (5) – 1997 (Open), 2017 (Open), 2018 (Open), 2019 (Open), 2022 (Open)
- Football (1) – 2022 (5A)

== Army program ==
The school's Army JROTC program is run by SFC Rena Rivere and CW2 Johnson

== Notable alumni ==
- Tommy Castellanos – quarterback for Florida State
- Ernest Jones – professional football player
- Leodis McKelvin – professional football player
- Jimmy Staten – professional football player
