= Bickley, Georgia =

Unincorporated community in Georgia, U.S.

Coordinates: 31°24′20″N 82°36′10″W

Bickley is an unincorporated community in Ware County, Georgia, United States. It is located northwest of Waycross and is south of Nicholls, Georgia in Coffee County. Bickley is an agricultural community.

== History ==
A post office called Bickley was established in 1881, and remained in operation until 1909. In 1900, the community had 100 inhabitants.

== Demographics ==
Historical population
Census	Pop.	Note	%±
1900	100		—
U.S. Decennial Census

As previously stated, the community was home to 100 inhabitants in 1900. Bickley was founded just after the 1880 census, and its census records from the Census of 1890 were burned. It was disorganized before the census of 1910, so despite the settlement existing for 28 years, only census data from 1900 is available.
