= Deenwood, Georgia =

- Unincorporated community Census-designated place
- Location in Ware County and the state of Georgia
- Coordinates: 31°14′20″N 82°22′18″W
- Country: United States
- State: Georgia
- County: Ware

Area
  - Total: 3.39 sq mi (8.77 km^{2})
  - Land: 3.36 sq mi (8.69 km^{2})
  - Water: 0.035 sq mi (0.09 km^{2})
- Elevation: 135 ft (41 m)

Population (2020)
  - Total: 2,207
  - Density: 658.1/sq mi (254.09/km^{2})
- Time zone: UTC-5 (Eastern (EST))
  - Summer (DST): UTC-4 (EDT)
- FIPS code: 13-22080
- GNIS feature ID: 0357663

Deenwood is an unincorporated community and census-designated place (CDP) in Ware County, Georgia, United States. The population was 2,207 at the 2020 census. It is part of the Waycross micropolitan statistical area. Deenwood Baptist Church is named after this geographical area.

== Geography ==
Deenwood is located at 31°14′20″N 82°22′18″W (31.238993, -82.371540).

According to the United States Census Bureau, the CDP has a total area of 3.4 square miles (8.8 km^{2}), all land.

=== Climate ===
The climate in this area is characterized by relatively high temperatures and evenly distributed precipitation throughout the year. According to the Köppen Climate Classification system, Deenwood has a humid subtropical climate, abbreviated "Cfa" on climate maps.

Climate data for Deenwood, Georgia
Month	Jan	Feb	Mar	Apr	May	Jun	Jul	Aug	Sep	Oct	Nov	Dec	Year
Mean daily maximum °C (°F)	16 (60)	19 (66)	22 (71)	26 (78)	29 (84)	32 (89)	33 (91)	32 (89)	30 (86)	26 (78)	22 (71)	17 (62)	25 (77)
Mean daily minimum °C (°F)	4 (39)	6 (42)	9 (48)	12 (53)	16 (60)	20 (68)	21 (69)	21 (69)	19 (66)	14 (57)	9 (48)	5 (41)	13 (55)
Average precipitation mm (inches)	130 (5.1)	97 (3.8)	110 (4.5)	48 (1.9)	56 (2.2)	130 (5.2)	140 (5.7)	180 (7.1)	110 (4.2)	89 (3.5)	76 (3)	74 (2.9)	1,250 (49.2)
Source: Weatherbase

== Demographics ==
Historical population
Census	Pop.	Note	%±
1950	1,113		—
1960	2,758		147.8%
1970	3,015		9.3%
1980	3,580		18.7%
1990	2,055		−42.6%
2000	1,836		−10.7%
2010	2,146		16.9%
2020	2,207		2.8%
U.S. Decennial Census; 1850-1870 1870-1880; 1890-1910 1920-1930; 1940 1950 1960; 1970 1980 1990; 2000 2010 2020; 1950 and 1960 as Hebardville

In the 1950 U.S. census and 1960 U.S. census, the census recognized the unincorporated place of Hebardville which was roughly coterminous with Deenwood. In the 1970 U.S. census, the unincorporated community was renamed Deenwood and designated a CDP in 1980 United States census.

=== Racial and ethnic composition ===
Deenwood, Georgia – Racial and ethnic composition Note: the US Census treats Hispanic/Latino as an ethnic category. This table excludes Latinos from the racial categories and assigns them to a separate category. Hispanics/Latinos may be of any race.
Race / Ethnicity (NH = Non-Hispanic)	Pop 2000	Pop 2010	Pop 2020	% 2000	% 2010	% 2020
White alone (NH)	1,672	1,735	1,605	91.07%	80.85%	72.72%
Black or African American alone (NH)	134	309	405	7.30%	14.40%	18.35%
Native American or Alaska Native alone (NH)	0	4	3	0.00%	0.19%	0.14%
Asian alone (NH)	10	26	30	0.54%	1.21%	1.36%
Pacific Islander alone (NH)	2	0	0	0.11%	0.00%	0.00%
Some Other Race alone (NH)	2	0	13	0.11%	0.00%	0.59%
Mixed race or Multiracial (NH)	3	39	72	0.16%	1.82%	3.26%
Hispanic or Latino (any race)	13	33	79	0.71%	1.54%	3.58%
Total	1,836	2,146	2,207	100.00%	100.00%	100.00%

=== 2020 census ===
As of the 2020 census, Deenwood had a population of 2,207. The median age was 43.3 years. 23.1% of residents were under the age of 18 and 20.6% of residents were 65 years of age or older. For every 100 females there were 96.5 males, and for every 100 females age 18 and over there were 91.8 males age 18 and over.

87.2% of residents lived in urban areas, while 12.8% lived in rural areas.

There were 892 households in Deenwood, of which 35.3% had children under the age of 18 living in them. Of all households, 50.6% were married-couple households, 17.7% were households with a male householder and no spouse or partner present, and 28.0% were households with a female householder and no spouse or partner present. About 22.9% of all households were made up of individuals and 12.8% had someone living alone who was 65 years of age or older.

There were 1,012 housing units, of which 11.9% were vacant. The homeowner vacancy rate was 1.1% and the rental vacancy rate was 5.5%.
