= Millwood, Georgia =

- Unincorporated community Census-designated place
- Interactive map of Millwood, Georgia
- Country: United States
- State: Georgia
- County: Ware

Population (2020)
  - Total: 72

Millwood is an unincorporated community and census-designated place (CDP) in Ware County, Georgia, United States, located west of Waycross. The community is part of the Waycross Micropolitan Statistical Area.

The 2020 census listed a population of 72.

== History ==
A post office was established at Millwood in 1887.

The Georgia General Assembly incorporated Millwood as a town in 1905. The town's municipal charter was repealed in 1909.

== Demographics ==
Historical population
Census	Pop.	Note	%±
2020	72		—
U.S. Decennial Census; 2020

Millwood was first listed as a census designated place in the 2020 U.S. census.

Millwood CDP, Georgia – Racial and ethnic composition Note: the US Census treats Hispanic/Latino as an ethnic category. This table excludes Latinos from the racial categories and assigns them to a separate category. Hispanics/Latinos may be of any race.
Race / Ethnicity (NH = Non-Hispanic)	Pop 2020	% 2020
White alone (NH)	69	95.83%
Black or African American alone (NH)	0	0.00%
Native American or Alaska Native alone (NH)	0	0.00%
Asian alone (NH)	0	0.00%
Pacific Islander alone (NH)	0	0.00%
Some Other Race alone (NH)	0	0.00%
Mixed Race or Multi-Racial (NH)	3	4.17%
Hispanic or Latino (any race)	0	0.00%
Total	72	100.00%

In 2020, it had a population of 72.

== Geography ==
Millwood is located near 31°15′54.5″N 82°39′36.6″W.
