= Dixie Union, Georgia =

Unincorporated community in Ware County, Georgia, United States

Dixie Union
- Unincorporated community Census-designated place
- Location within the state of Georgia Dixie Union (the United States)
- Coordinates: 31°20′22″N 82°27′47″W
- Country: United States
- State: Georgia
- County: Ware

Population (2020)
  - Total: 184
- Time zone: UTC-5 (Eastern (EST))
  - Summer (DST): UTC-4 (EDT)
- ZIP code: 31503
- Area code: 912
- GNIS feature ID: 313496

Dixie Union is an unincorporated community and census-designated place (CDP) in Ware County, Georgia, United States. It lies north of Waycross on U.S. Route 1 and 23. The community is part of the Waycross Micropolitan Statistical Area.

The 2020 census listed a population of 184.

== Demographics ==
Historical population
Census	Pop.	Note	%±
2020	184		—
U.S. Decennial Census; 2020

Dixie Union was first listed as a census designated place in the 2020 census.

Dixie Union CDP, Georgia – Racial and ethnic composition Note: the US Census treats Hispanic/Latino as an ethnic category. This table excludes Latinos from the racial categories and assigns them to a separate category. Hispanics/Latinos may be of any race.
Race / Ethnicity (NH = Non-Hispanic)	Pop 2020	% 2020
White alone (NH)	155	84.24%
Black or African American alone (NH)	14	7.61%
Native American or Alaska Native alone (NH)	1	0.54%
Asian alone (NH)	2	1.09%
Pacific Islander alone (NH)	1	0.54%
Some Other Race alone (NH)	0	0.00%
Mixed Race or Multi-Racial (NH)	0	0.00%
Hispanic or Latino (any race)	11	5.98%
Total	184	100.00%

In 2020, it had a population of 184.
