= Ware County, Georgia =

County in Georgia, United States

- County
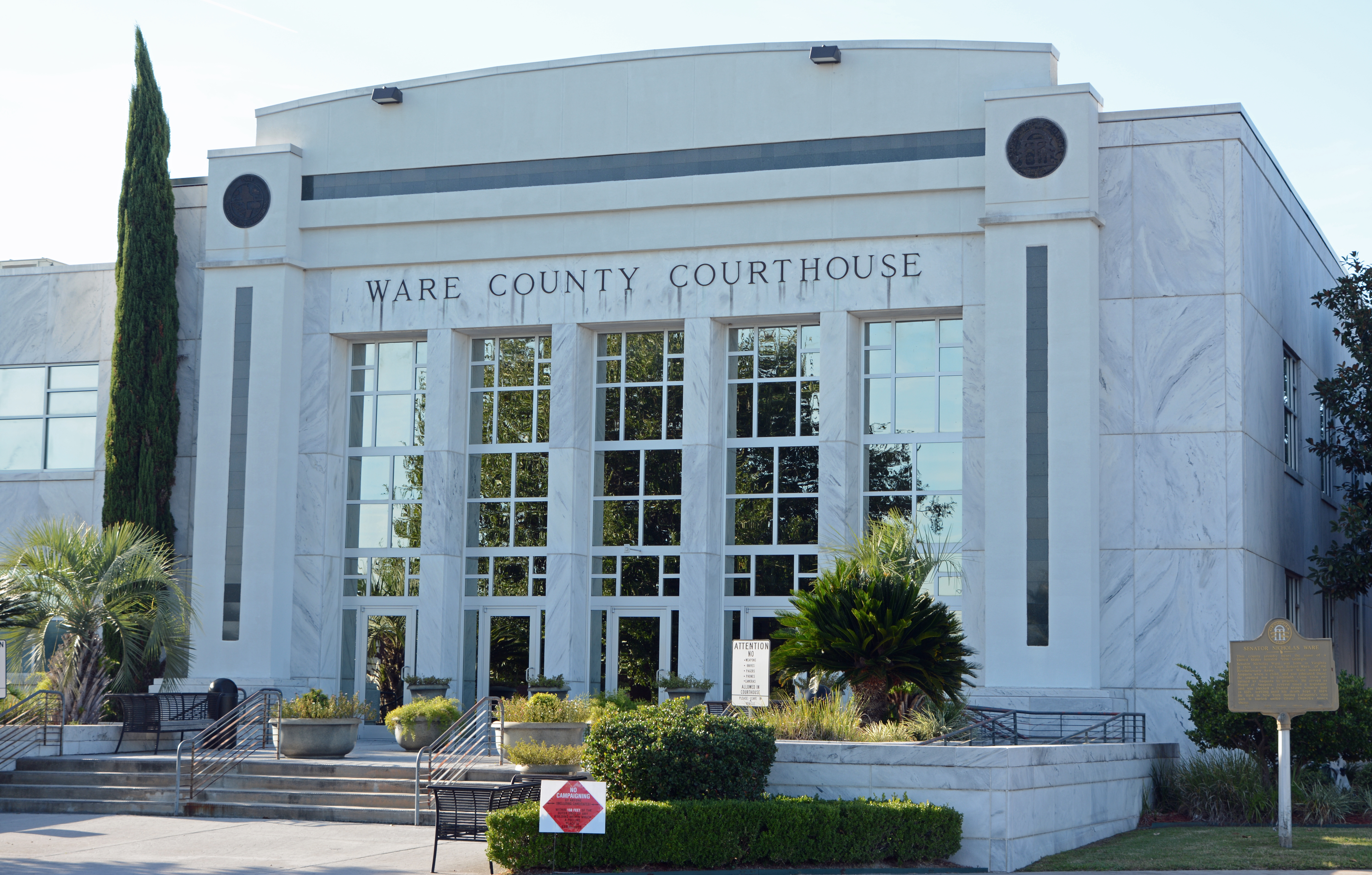
- Ware County Courthouse in Waycross

- Seal

- Location within the U.S. state of Georgia
- Coordinates: 31°03′N 82°25′W
- Country: United States
- State: Georgia
- Founded: December 15, 1824; 201 years ago
- Named for: Nicholas Ware
- Seat: Waycross
- Largest city: Waycross

Area
  - Total: 908 sq mi (2,350 km^{2})
  - Land: 892 sq mi (2,310 km^{2})
  - Water: 16 sq mi (41 km^{2}) 1.7%

Population (2020)
  - Total: 36,251
  - Estimate (2025): 36,906 ▲
  - Density: 41/sq mi (16/km^{2})
- Time zone: UTC−5 (Eastern)
  - Summer (DST): UTC−4 (EDT)
- Congressional district: 1st
- Website: warecountyga.gov

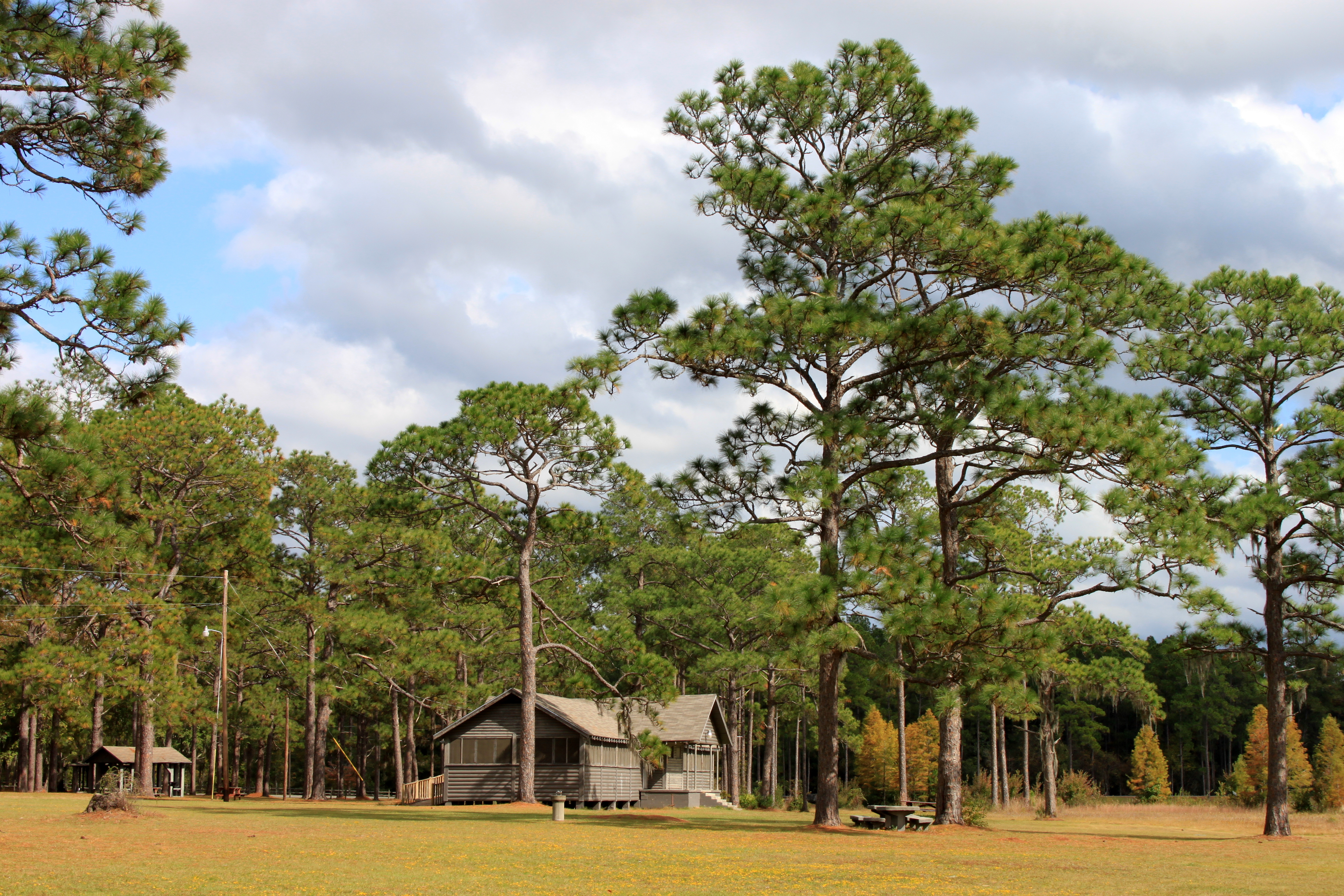
Laura S. Walker State Park

Ware County is a county located in the southeastern part of the U.S. state of Georgia. As of the 2020 census, the population was 36,251. The county seat and only incorporated place is Waycross. Ware County is part of the Waycross, Georgia micropolitan statistical area.

== History ==
Ware County, Georgia's 60th county, was created on December 15, 1824, by an act of the Georgia General Assembly from land that was originally part of Appling County.

The county is named for Nicholas Ware, the mayor of Augusta, Georgia from (1819–1821) and United States Senator who represented Georgia from 1821 until his death in 1824.

Several counties were later created from parts of the original Ware County borders:

- Bacon County (from portions of Appling, Pierce, and Ware counties in 1917)
- Charlton County (from portions of Camden and Ware county in 1854)
- Clinch County (from portions of Lowndes and Ware counties in 1850)
- Coffee County (from portions of Clinch, Irwin, Telfair, and Ware counties in 1854)
- Pierce County (from portions of Appling and Ware counties in 1857)

Ware County was home to Laura S. Walker (1861–1955) a noted author and conservationist. Walker promoted a comprehensive program of forestry activity, including the establishment of forest parks. She erected markers and monuments along old trails and at historic sites, in Waycross and Ware County so that local history would not be forgotten. Walker wrote three books about the land and history of her home. They are: History of Ware County, Georgia About "Old Okefenåok" and Doctors of Primitive Times and Horse and Buggy Days of Ware County. An effort to recognize her work culminated in President Franklin D. Roosevelt issuing a proclamation to establish the Laura S. Walker National Park, located in Ware County, in her honor. She was the only living person for whom a state or national park was named. In 1937, the federal government purchased distressed farmland for the park. Work on the park was undertaken by the Works Progress Administration and the Civilian Conservation Corps. In 1941, the national park was deeded over to Georgia, becoming the State's 13th state park.

== Geography ==
According to the U.S. Census Bureau, the county has a total area of 908 square miles (2,350 km^{2}), of which 892 square miles (2,310 km^{2}) is land and 16 square miles (41 km^{2}) (1.7%) is water. It is the largest county in Georgia by area. A large portion of the county lies within the Okefenokee Swamp and its federally protected areas.

More than half of Ware County, made up by the western half of the southern portion of the county, the land bridge to the northern portion of the county, and the southern and western portion of the northern section of the county, is located in the Upper Suwannee River sub-basin of the Suwannee River basin. The eastern half of the southern portion of Ware County is located in the St. Marys River sub-basin of the St. Marys-Satilla River basin. The rest of the county, from just southeast to north and west of Waycross, is located in the Satilla River sub-basin of the same St. Marys-Satilla River basin.

=== Major highways ===
- U.S. Route 1 / U.S. Route 23 / State Route 4
  - U.S. Route 1 Business / U.S. Route 23 Business / State Route 4 Business
- U.S. Route 82 / State Route 520
- U.S. Route 84 / State Route 38
- State Route 122
- State Route 158
- State Route 177

=== Adjacent counties ===
- Bacon County - north
- Pierce County - east
- Brantley County - east
- Charlton County - southeast
- Baker County, Florida - south
- Clinch County - west
- Atkinson County - west
- Coffee County - northwest

=== National protected area ===
- Okefenokee National Wildlife Refuge (part)

== Communities ==
=== City ===
- Waycross

=== Census-designated places ===
- Deenwood
- Dixie Union
- Manor
- Millwood
- Sunnyside
- Waresboro

=== Unincorporated communities ===
- Bickley
- Ruskin
- Jamestown
- Telmore

== Demographics ==
Historical population
Census	Pop.	Note	%±
1830	1,205		—
1840	2,323		92.8%
1850	3,888		67.4%
1860	2,200		−43.4%
1870	2,286		3.9%
1880	4,159		81.9%
1890	8,811		111.9%
1900	13,761		56.2%
1910	22,957		66.8%
1920	28,361		23.5%
1930	26,558		−6.4%
1940	27,929		5.2%
1950	30,289		8.4%
1960	34,219		13.0%
1970	33,525		−2.0%
1980	37,180		10.9%
1990	35,471		−4.6%
2000	35,483		0.0%
2010	36,312		2.3%
2020	36,251		−0.2%
2025 (est.)	36,906	▲	1.8%
U.S. Decennial Census; 1790-1880 1890-1910; 1920-1930 1930-1940; 1940-1950 1960-1980; 1980-2000 2010

=== Racial and ethnic composition ===
Ware County, Georgia – Racial and ethnic composition Note: the US Census treats Hispanic/Latino as an ethnic category. This table excludes Latinos from the racial categories and assigns them to a separate category. Hispanics/Latinos may be of any race.
Race / Ethnicity (NH = Non-Hispanic)	Pop 1980	Pop 1990	Pop 2000	Pop 2010	Pop 2020	% 1980	% 1990	% 2000	% 2010	% 2020
White alone (NH)	28,473	25,912	24,434	23,583	22,275	76.58%	73.05%	68.86%	64.95%	61.45%
Black or African American alone (NH)	8,284	9,193	9,907	10,662	10,703	22.28%	25.92%	27.92%	29.36%	29.52%
Native American or Alaska Native alone (NH)	63	55	62	97	77	0.17%	0.16%	0.17%	0.27%	0.21%
Asian alone (NH)	87	120	166	278	333	0.23%	0.34%	0.47%	0.77%	0.92%
Native Hawaiian or Pacific Islander alone (NH)	x	x	11	7	18	x	x	0.03%	0.02%	0.05%
Other race alone (NH)	0	1	23	35	112	0.00%	0.00%	0.06%	0.10%	0.31%
Mixed race or Multiracial (NH)	x	x	192	443	1,121	x	x	0.54%	1.22%	3.09%
Hispanic or Latino (any race)	273	190	688	1,207	1,612	0.73%	0.54%	1.94%	3.32%	4.45%
Total	37,180	35,471	35,483	36,312	36,251	100.00%	100.00%	100.00%	100.00%	100.00%

=== 2020 census ===
As of the 2020 census, the county had a population of 36,251 and 8,909 families residing in the county. The median age was 39.8 years. 23.3% of residents were under the age of 18 and 18.6% of residents were 65 years of age or older. For every 100 females there were 100.4 males, and for every 100 females age 18 and over there were 98.5 males age 18 and over. 67.9% of residents lived in urban areas, while 32.1% lived in rural areas.

The racial makeup of the county was 62.4% White, 29.7% Black or African American, 0.3% American Indian and Alaska Native, 0.9% Asian, 0.0% Native Hawaiian and Pacific Islander, 2.4% from some other race, and 4.3% from two or more races. Hispanic or Latino residents of any race comprised 4.4% of the population.

There were 13,651 households in the county, of which 31.5% had children under the age of 18 living with them and 33.8% had a female householder with no spouse or partner present. About 29.0% of all households were made up of individuals and 13.6% had someone living alone who was 65 years of age or older.

There were 15,858 housing units, of which 13.9% were vacant. Among occupied housing units, 62.2% were owner-occupied and 37.8% were renter-occupied. The homeowner vacancy rate was 2.0% and the rental vacancy rate was 7.7%.

== Education ==
=== High schools ===
- Ware County High School, Waycross

=== Middle schools ===
- Ware County Middle School, Waycross
- Waycross Middle School, Waycross

=== Elementary schools ===
- Wacona Elementary School, Waycross
- Center Elementary School, Waycross
- Williams Heights Elementary School, Waycross
- Memorial Drive Elementary School, Waycross
- Ruskin Elementary School, Waycross
- Waresboro Elementary School, Waycross

=== Preschools ===
- DAFFODIL Preschool, Waycross

=== Private schools ===
- Southside Christian School

=== Higher education ===
- South Georgia State College, Waycross
- Coastal Pines Technical College, Waycross

== Politics ==
As of the 2020s, Ware County is a Republican stronghold, voting 71% for Donald Trump in 2024. Ware County has favored the Republican Party in recent presidential elections, although it was a strongly Democratic Solid South county until the 1980s. In the 1992 election, Ware County gave Democrat Bill Clinton and Republican George H. W. Bush an exact tie, the most recent time in American history a county was tied between the two major party presidential candidates.

For elections to the United States House of Representatives, Ware County is part of Georgia's 1st congressional district, currently represented by Buddy Carter. For elections to the Georgia State Senate, Ware County is part of districts 3 and 8. For elections to the Georgia House of Representatives, Ware County is part of districts 174 and 176.

United States presidential election results for Ware County, Georgia
Year	Republican		Democratic		Third party(ies)	
Year	No.	%	No.	%	No.	%
1880	201	36.28%	353	63.72%	0	0.00%
1884	179	32.90%	365	67.10%	0	0.00%
1888	186	32.52%	369	64.51%	17	2.97%
1892	262	23.06%	775	68.22%	99	8.71%
1896	330	36.11%	545	59.63%	39	4.27%
1900	107	15.11%	601	84.89%	0	0.00%
1904	158	19.46%	635	78.20%	19	2.34%
1908	190	18.85%	771	76.49%	47	4.66%
1912	39	3.66%	972	91.27%	54	5.07%
1916	59	4.69%	1,066	84.74%	133	10.57%
1920	215	19.27%	901	80.73%	0	0.00%
1924	216	10.82%	1,497	75.00%	283	14.18%
1928	1,339	48.60%	1,416	51.40%	0	0.00%
1932	205	7.53%	2,504	91.96%	14	0.51%
1936	256	9.06%	2,566	90.77%	5	0.18%
1940	308	10.31%	2,672	89.48%	6	0.20%
1944	459	16.59%	2,306	83.34%	2	0.07%
1948	655	14.09%	2,611	56.15%	1,384	29.76%
1952	2,418	30.06%	5,627	69.94%	0	0.00%
1956	2,276	27.88%	5,888	72.12%	0	0.00%
1960	2,235	30.47%	5,099	69.53%	0	0.00%
1964	4,948	48.81%	5,189	51.19%	0	0.00%
1968	2,047	20.07%	2,255	22.11%	5,895	57.81%
1972	6,578	79.23%	1,724	20.77%	0	0.00%
1976	2,661	25.64%	7,719	74.36%	0	0.00%
1980	3,715	36.65%	6,307	62.22%	115	1.13%
1984	5,547	55.57%	4,435	44.43%	0	0.00%
1988	4,819	52.59%	4,292	46.84%	52	0.57%
1992	4,573	43.87%	4,573	43.87%	1,278	12.26%
1996	4,746	49.55%	4,171	43.54%	662	6.91%
2000	6,099	63.35%	3,480	36.14%	49	0.51%
2004	7,790	68.99%	3,449	30.55%	52	0.46%
2008	8,311	66.83%	4,034	32.44%	91	0.73%
2012	7,941	66.44%	3,900	32.63%	112	0.94%
2016	8,513	69.87%	3,440	28.23%	231	1.90%
2020	9,903	69.79%	4,169	29.38%	117	0.82%
2024	10,279	71.42%	4,068	28.27%	45	0.31%

United States Senate election results for Ware County, Georgia2
Year	Republican		Democratic		Third party(ies)	
Year	No.	%	No.	%	No.	%
2020	9,773	69.91%	3,937	28.16%	269	1.92%
2020	8,498	69.64%	3,704	30.36%	0	0.00%

United States Senate election results for Ware County, Georgia3
Year	Republican		Democratic		Third party(ies)	
Year	No.	%	No.	%	No.	%
2020	5,305	38.60%	1,748	12.72%	6,690	48.68%
2020	9,865	70.08%	4,211	29.92%	0	0.00%
2022	7,567	70.69%	2,976	27.80%	161	1.50%
2022	7,005	71.00%	2,861	29.00%	0	0.00%

Georgia Gubernatorial election results for Ware County
Year	Republican		Democratic		Third party(ies)	
Year	No.	%	No.	%	No.	%
2022	7,855	73.06%	2,828	26.30%	69	0.64%

== See also ==
- National Register of Historic Places listings in Ware County, Georgia
- Obediah Barber Homestead
- Laura S. Walker State Park
- List of counties in Georgia
