= Sunnyside, Georgia =

- Unincorporated community Census-designated place
- Location in Ware County and the state of Georgia
- Country: United States
- State: Georgia
- Counties: Ware

Area
  - Total: 1.5 sq mi (3.8 km^{2})
  - Land: 1.4 sq mi (3.7 km^{2})
  - Water: 0.039 sq mi (0.1 km^{2})

Population (2020)
  - Total: 1,472
  - Density: 1,003/sq mi (387.4/km^{2})

Sunnyside is an unincorporated community and census-designated place (CDP) in Ware County, Georgia, United States. The population was 1,472 in 2020. It is part of the Waycross micropolitan statistical area.

== Geography ==
Sunnyside is located at 31°14′13″N 82°20′22″W.

According to the United States Census Bureau, the CDP has a total area of 1.5 square miles (3.8 km^{2}), of which 1.4 square miles (3.7 km^{2}) is land and 0.1 square mile (0.2 km^{2}) (4.08%) is water.

=== Climate ===
The climate is characterized by relatively high temperatures and evenly distributed precipitation throughout the year. The Köppen Climate Classification subtype for this climate is "Cfa" (Humid Subtropical Climate).

Climate data for Sunnyside, Georgia
Month	Jan	Feb	Mar	Apr	May	Jun	Jul	Aug	Sep	Oct	Nov	Dec	Year
Mean daily maximum °C (°F)	17 (62)	19 (66)	22 (71)	26 (78)	30 (86)	33 (91)	33 (91)	33 (91)	31 (87)	27 (80)	22 (71)	18 (64)	25 (77)
Mean daily minimum °C (°F)	3 (37)	4 (39)	8 (46)	11 (51)	15 (59)	19 (66)	21 (69)	21 (69)	19 (66)	13 (55)	7 (44)	4 (39)	12 (53)
Average precipitation mm (inches)	91 (3.6)	97 (3.8)	100 (4.1)	79 (3.1)	91 (3.6)	140 (5.5)	170 (6.7)	150 (6)	110 (4.5)	69 (2.7)	56 (2.2)	79 (3.1)	1,240 (48.8)
Source: Weatherbase

== Demographics ==
Historical population
Census	Pop.	Note	%±
1980	1,658		—
1990	1,506		−9.2%
2000	1,385		−8.0%
2010	1,303		−5.9%
2020	1,472		13.0%
U.S. Decennial Census; 1850-1870 1870-1880; 1890-1910 1920-1930; 1940 1950 1960; 1970 1980 1990; 2000 2010 2020

Sunnyside was first listed as a CDP in the 1980 United States census.

=== Racial and ethnic composition ===
Sunnyside, Georgia – Racial and ethnic composition Note: the US Census treats Hispanic/Latino as an ethnic category. This table excludes Latinos from the racial categories and assigns them to a separate category. Hispanics/Latinos may be of any race.
Race / Ethnicity (NH = Non-Hispanic)	Pop. 2000	Pop. 2010	Pop. 2020	% 2000	% 2010	% 2020
White alone (NH)	1,286	1,105	1,074	92.85%	84.80%	72.96%
Black or African American alone (NH)	75	134	258	5.42%	10.28%	17.53%
Native American or Alaska Native alone (NH)	3	5	2	0.22%	0.38%	0.14%
Asian alone (NH)	5	10	14	0.36%	0.77%	0.95%
Pacific Islander alone (NH)	0	0	0	0.00%	0.00%	0.00%
Other race alone (NH)	3	0	12	0.22%	0.00%	0.82%
Mixed race or Multiracial (NH)	5	14	59	0.36%	1.07%	4.01%
Hispanic or Latino (any race)	8	35	53	0.58%	2.69%	3.60%
Total	1,385	1,303	1,472	100.00%	100.00%	100.00%

=== 2020 census ===
As of the 2020 census, Sunnyside had a population of 1,472. The median age was 39.6 years. 24.5% of residents were under the age of 18 and 18.1% were 65 years of age or older. For every 100 females there were 86.6 males, and for every 100 females age 18 and over there were 78.9 males age 18 and over.

100.0% of residents lived in urban areas, while 0.0% lived in rural areas.

There were 571 households in Sunnyside, of which 28.9% had children under the age of 18 living in them. Of all households, 44.8% were married-couple households, 12.3% were households with a male householder and no spouse or partner present, and 38.5% were households with a female householder and no spouse or partner present. About 31.5% of all households were made up of individuals, and 15.3% had someone living alone who was 65 years of age or older.

There were 628 housing units, of which 9.1% were vacant. The homeowner vacancy rate was 2.4%, and the rental vacancy rate was 9.9%.

== Notable people ==
- Ken Barfield, football player
