= Manor, Georgia =

- Unincorporated community Census-designated place
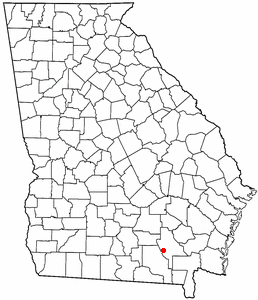
- Location of Manor, Georgia
- Coordinates: 31.104°N 82.573°W
- Country: United States
- State: Georgia
- County: Ware

Population (2020)
  - Total: 94
- ZIP Code: 31550
- Area code: 912

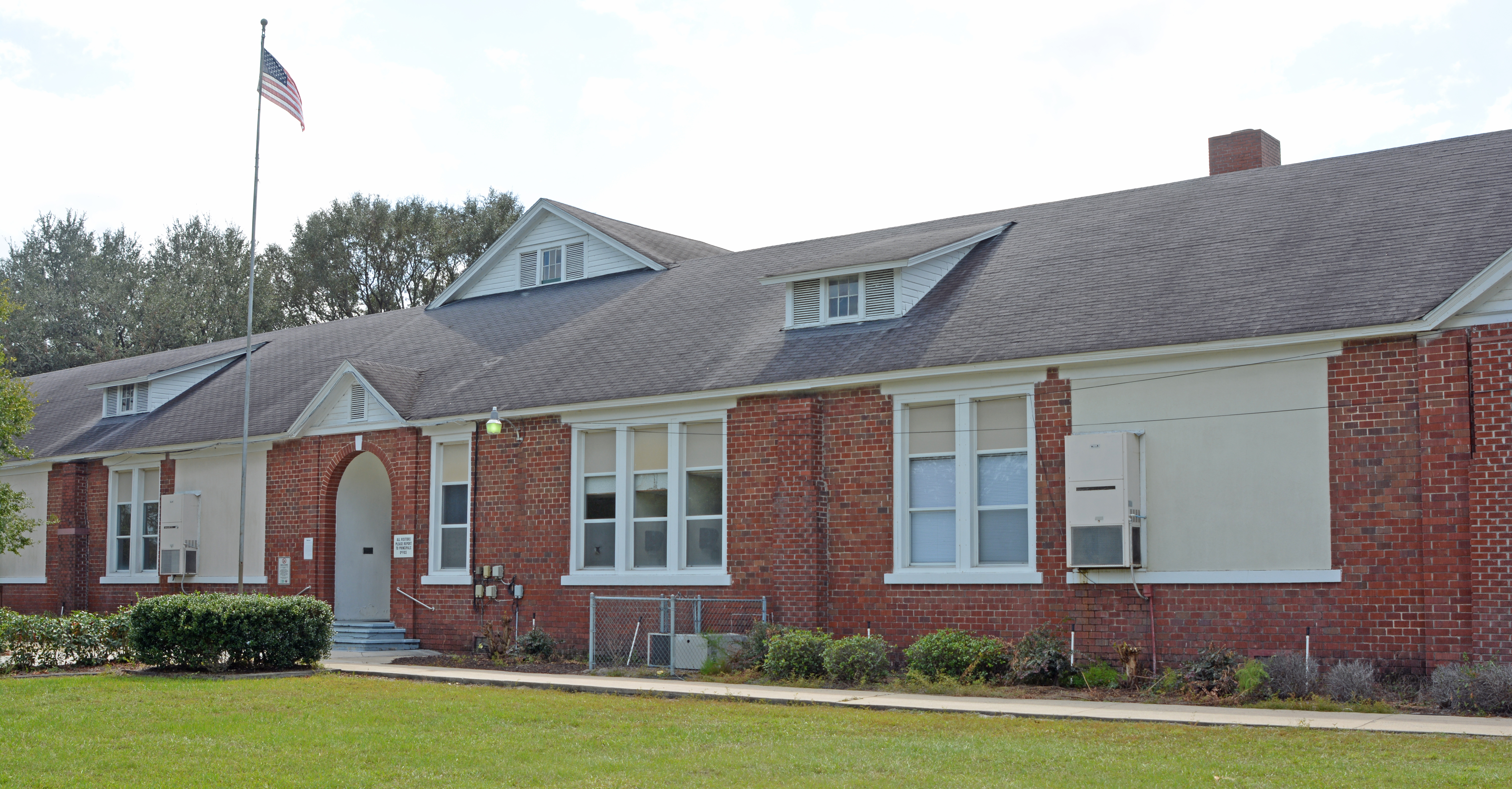
Former Manor School

Manor (pronounced with a long "a") is an unincorporated community and census-designated place (CDP) in Ware County, Georgia, United States. It lies southwest of Waycross on U.S. Route 84. The community is part of the Waycross Micropolitan Statistical Area.

It is the former home of Ware Magnet, a Georgia School of Success. After a majority vote by school board members, the K-12 school was closed in May 2010 due to financial issues, despite its academic excellence.

The 2020 census listed a population of 94.

== Geography ==
Manor is located at 31.104°N 82.573°W.

== Demographics ==
Historical population
Census	Pop.	Note	%±
2020	94		—
U.S. Decennial Census; 2020

Manor was first listed as a census designated place in the 2020 United States census.

Manor CDP, Georgia – Racial and ethnic composition Note: the US Census treats Hispanic/Latino as an ethnic category. This table excludes Latinos from the racial categories and assigns them to a separate category. Hispanics/Latinos may be of any race.
Race / Ethnicity (NH = Non-Hispanic)	Pop 2020	% 2020
White alone (NH)	79	84.04%
Black or African American alone (NH)	2	2.13%
Native American or Alaska Native alone (NH)	0	0.00%
Asian alone (NH)	8	8.51%
Pacific Islander alone (NH)	0	0.00%
Some Other Race alone (NH)	0	0.00%
Mixed Race or Multi-Racial (NH)	1	1.06%
Hispanic or Latino (any race)	4	4.26%
Total	94	100.00%

In 2020, it had a population of 94.
