= National Register of Historic Places listings in Ware County, Georgia =

This is a list of properties and districts in Ware County, Georgia that are listed on the National Register of Historic Places (NRHP).

This National Park Service list is complete through NPS recent listings posted March 21, 2025.

== Current listings ==
	Name on the Register	Image	Date listed	Location	City or town	Description
1	Obediah Barber Homestead	Obediah Barber Homestead	June 20, 1995 (#95000742)	Off Swamp Rd. approximately 7 mi. S of Waycross; 31°05′25″N 82°20′45″W	Waycross	Built in 1870, the main house, kitchen building, and well are on the NRHP. website
2	Downtown Waycross Historic District	Downtown Waycross Historic District	March 20, 1992 (#92000125)	Roughly bounded by the Seaboard Coast Line RR tracks and Albany, Isabella, Remshart and Nicholls Sts. 31°12′35″N 82°21′36″W	Waycross	Includes the Post Office, the Phoenix Hotel, and many other buildings
3	First African Baptist Church and Parsonage	First African Baptist Church and Parsonage	April 11, 2003 (#03000197)	615 Knight St. and 407 Satilla Blvd. 31°12′37″N 82°20′36″W	Waycross	Church built ca. 1905, parsonage built ca. 1910
4	Lott Cemetery	Lott Cemetery	July 24, 2008 (#08000712)	Bounded by Butler St., Quarterman St., Tebeau St., and Pendleton Pl. 31°13′13″N 82°21′19″W	Waycross	Established in 1877
5	Manor School	Manor School	July 17, 2017 (#100001310)	4650 Manor Millwood Rd. 31°06′18″N 82°34′27″W	Manor	
6	Phoenix Hotel	Phoenix Hotel	April 17, 1986 (#86000802)	201-222 Pendleton St. 31°12′33″N 82°21′37″W	Waycross	Built ca. 1890, remodeled in 1913
7	U.S. Post Office and Courthouse	U.S. Post Office and Courthouse	February 1, 1980 (#80001258)	605 Elizabeth St. 31°12′34″N 82°21′41″W	Waycross	Built in 1911, expanded in 1936
8	Waycross Historic District	Waycross Historic District	June 29, 1976 (#76000656)	Roughly bounded by Plant Ave., Williams, Lee, Chandler, and Stephen Sts. 31°12′19″N 82°21′16″W	Waycross	Pictured: Summerall Tillman Home, Gilmore St.
