= Waycross, Georgia =

City in Georgia, US

Waycross
- City
- City of Waycross
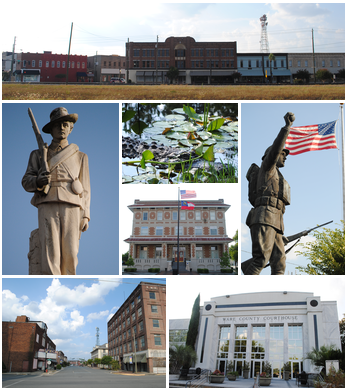
- Images from top, left to right: Downtown Waycross, Confederate memorial, alligator in the Okefenokee Swamp, Waycross City Hall, World War I memorial, Downtown Waycross Historic District, Ware County Courthouse

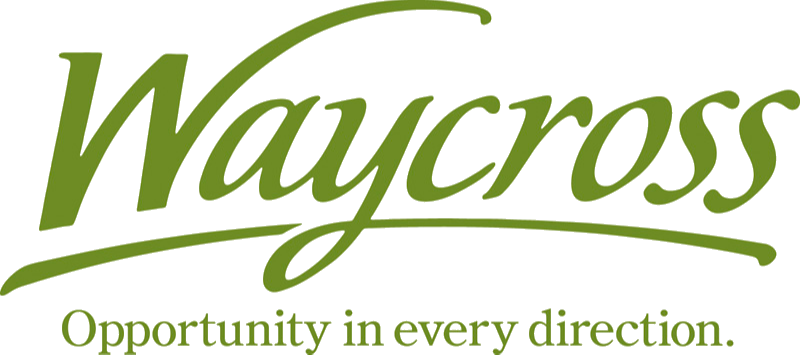
- Flag Seal Logo
- Motto: Headwaters of the Okefenokee
- Location in Ware County and the state of Georgia
- Coordinates: 31°12′50″N 82°21′18″W
- Country: United States
- State: Georgia
- County: Ware
- Established: 1820

Government
  - Mayor: Michael-Angelo James

Area
  - City: 11.96 sq mi (30.97 km^{2})
  - Land: 11.86 sq mi (30.73 km^{2})
  - Water: 0.089 sq mi (0.23 km^{2})
- Elevation: 130 ft (40 m)

Population (2020)
  - City: 13,942
  - Density: 1,180/sq mi (454/km^{2})
  - Urban: 36,312
  - Metro: 54,494
- Time zone: UTC−5 (EST)
  - Summer (DST): UTC−4 (EDT)
- ZIP Codes: 31501–31503
- Area code: 912
- FIPS code: 13-80956
- GNIS feature ID: 0356622
- Website: www.waycrossga.gov

Waycross is the seat of government of and the only incorporated city in Ware County in the U.S. state of Georgia. Its population was 13,942 at the 2020 census.

Waycross gets its name from the city's location at key railroad junctions; lines from six directions meet at the city.

== History ==
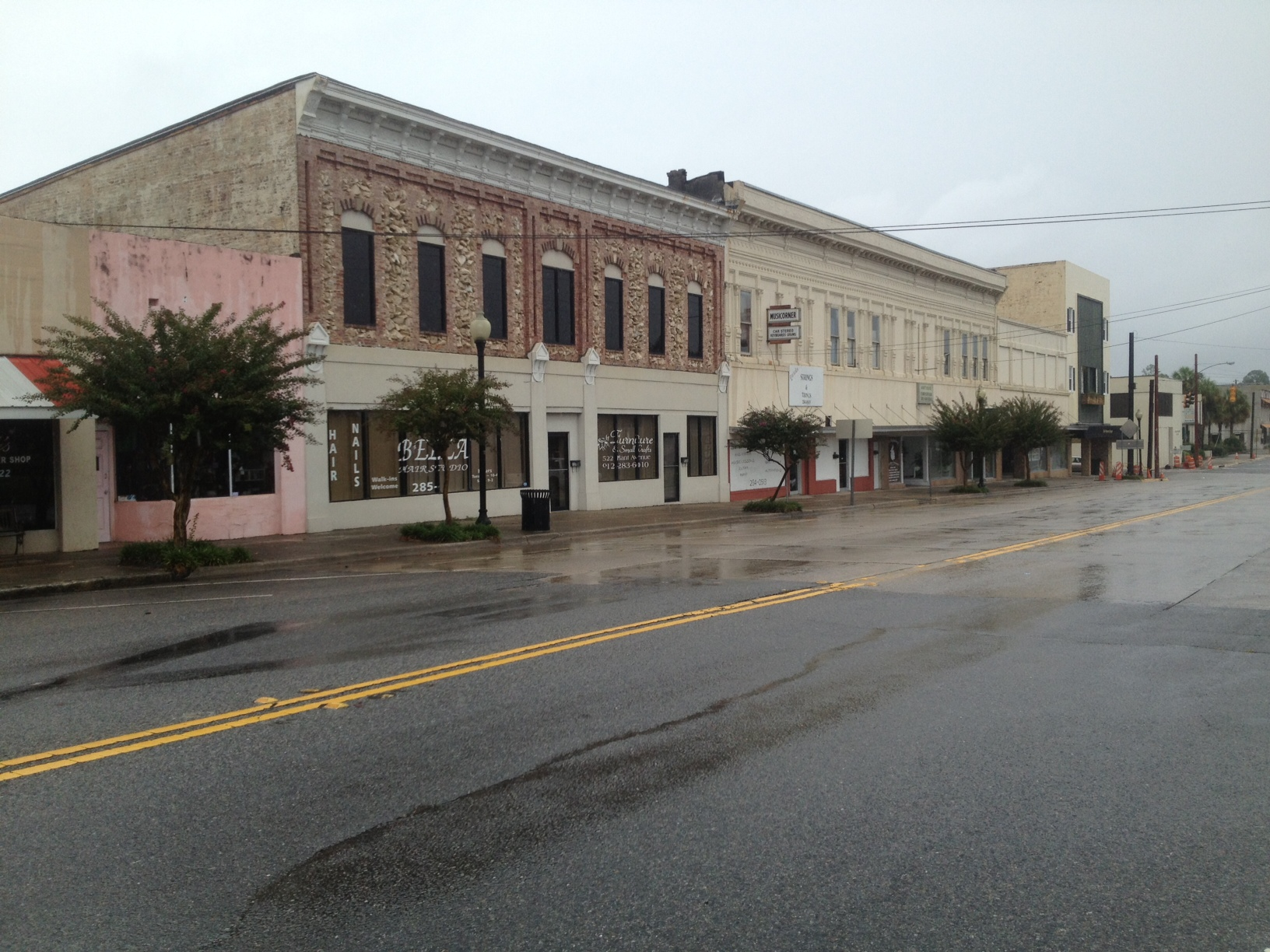
Street in the Downtown Waycross Historic District

Waycross includes two historic districts (Downtown Waycross Historic District and Waycross Historic District) and several other properties that are on the National Register of Historic Places, including the U.S. Post Office and Courthouse, Lott Cemetery, the First African Baptist Church and Parsonage, and the Obediah Barber Homestead (which is seven miles south of the city).

The area now known as Waycross was first settled c. 1820, locally known as "Old Nine" or "Number Nine" and then Pendleton. It was renamed Tebeauville in 1857, incorporated under that name in 1866, and designated county seat of Ware County in 1873. It was incorporated as "Way Cross" on March 3, 1874.

The city council in Waycross opened municipal primary elections to white women in 1917, the first town in Georgia to do so. This action was taken because some of the largest property owners in town were women who wanted a say in how their tax dollars were spent. Two years later in 1919, Atlanta became the second Georgia city to do this. Georgia women would not generally get the right to vote in all elections until 1922.

Waycross was home to Laura S. Walker (1861–1955), a noted author and conservationist. Walker promoted a comprehensive program of forestry activity, including establishing forest parks. She erected markers and monuments along old trails and at historic sites, in Waycross and Ware County so that local history would not be forgotten. An effort to recognize her work culminated in President Franklin D Roosevelt issuing a proclamation to establish the Laura S. Walker National Park in her honor. She was the only living person for whom a state or national park was named. In 1937, the federal government purchased distressed farmland for the park. Work on the park was undertaken by the Works Progress Administration and the Civilian Conservation Corps. In 1941, the national park was deeded over to Georgia, becoming the state's 13th state park.

Waycross was the site of a B-29 crash in 1948, which led to the legal case United States v. Reynolds (1953), expanding the government's state secrets privilege.

During the 1950s, the city had a tourist gimmick; local police would stop motorists with out-of-state license plates and escort them to downtown Waycross. There, they would be met by the Welcome World Committee and given overnight lodging, dinner, and a trip to the Okefenokee Swamp. The tradition faded away after the interstates opened through Georgia.

In the mid-1990s, Walter "Bubba" Eaves created a frozen hamburger ("Bubba Burger") that needed no defrosting. This was the marketed by Eaves Foods, Inc., which changed its name to Flanders Hamburgers in 2000. Bubba Burgers are now sold nationwide, as well as worldwide, through the United States military commissary system.

== Geography ==
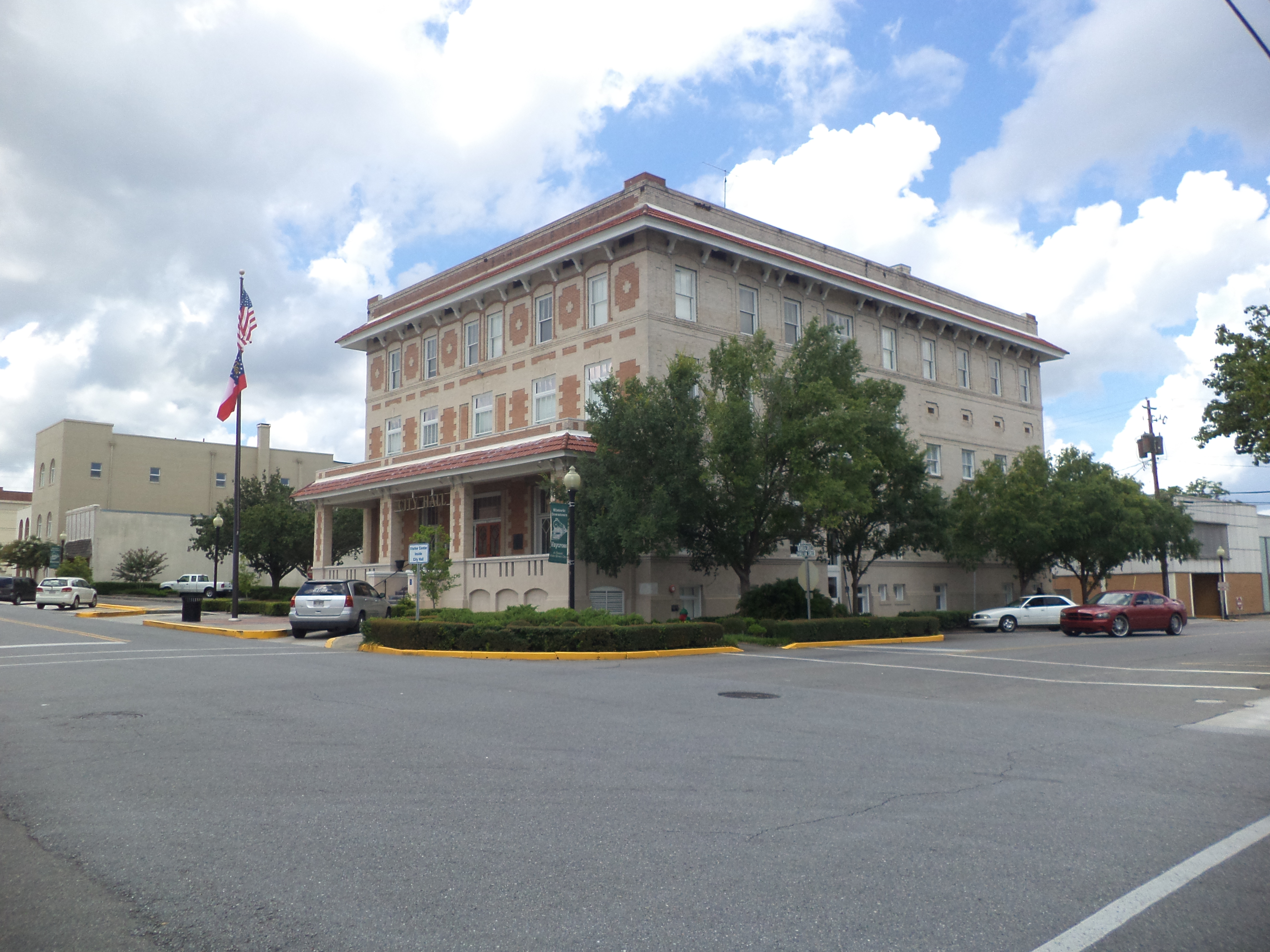
Waycross City Hall

Waycross is located at 31°12′50″N 82°21′18″W (31.213860, -82.354911) and is the closest city to the Okefenokee Swamp.

According to the United States Census Bureau, the city has a total area of 11.7 square miles (30 km^{2}), of which 0.04 sq mi (0.10 km^{2}), or 0.17%, is covered by water. The closest major city is Jacksonville, Florida, which is roughly 81 miles (130 km) away.

In May 2010, the city purchased the Bandalong Litter Trap and installed it in Tebeau Creek, a tributary of the Satilla River. The trap was invented in Australia, but is manufactured in the United States. Although the city has maintained good standing with the state's Environmental Protection Division, the city wanted to take action to reduce the amount of human-generated trash entering the Satilla River and ultimately the Atlantic Ocean. Georgia Governor Sonny Perdue said, "Water is one of Georgia's most important and precious resources... the litter trap installed by Waycross is a model of stewardship for the state and the nation." The Satilla River litter trap is the first in Georgia and only the second in the nation.

A portion of Waycross had been situated in Pierce County, but effective July 1, 2015, it was no longer allowed to be located in that county. State Rep. Chad Nimmer had introduced HB 523 during the 2015 legislative session without providing the required statutory notice to the City of Waycross. It deannexed the portion of Waycross located in Pierce County and precluded it from coming back into Pierce County.

=== Climate ===
Climate data for Waycross 4NE (1991-2020) extremes 1897–present
Month	Jan	Feb	Mar	Apr	May	Jun	Jul	Aug	Sep	Oct	Nov	Dec	Year
Record high °F (°C)	88 (31)	88 (31)	95 (35)	98 (37)	104 (40)	106 (41)	108 (42)	106 (41)	104 (40)	99 (37)	92 (33)	87 (31)	108 (42)
Mean daily maximum °F (°C)	63.9 (17.7)	68.0 (20.0)	74.5 (23.6)	80.9 (27.2)	87.7 (30.9)	92.0 (33.3)	94.1 (34.5)	92.9 (33.8)	88.9 (31.6)	81.0 (27.2)	73.9 (23.3)	67.1 (19.5)	80.4 (26.9)
Daily mean °F (°C)	50.3 (10.2)	54.1 (12.3)	59.9 (15.5)	66.2 (19.0)	74.0 (23.3)	80.4 (26.9)	82.7 (28.2)	81.9 (27.7)	77.4 (25.2)	68.1 (20.1)	59.4 (15.2)	53.0 (11.7)	67.3 (19.6)
Mean daily minimum °F (°C)	36.7 (2.6)	40.1 (4.5)	45.2 (7.3)	51.5 (10.8)	60.2 (15.7)	68.8 (20.4)	71.4 (21.9)	70.8 (21.6)	65.9 (18.8)	55.2 (12.9)	44.9 (7.2)	39.0 (3.9)	54.1 (12.3)
Record low °F (°C)	2 (−17)	2 (−17)	15 (−9)	22 (−6)	33 (1)	43 (6)	54 (12)	57 (14)	34 (1)	22 (−6)	18 (−8)	8 (−13)	2 (−17)
Average precipitation inches (mm)	3.89 (99)	3.71 (94)	3.95 (100)	3.13 (80)	3.32 (84)	6.80 (173)	5.93 (151)	6.84 (174)	4.46 (113)	3.28 (83)	2.22 (56)	2.89 (73)	50.42 (1,280)
Average precipitation days (≥ 0.01 in)	9.0	8.0	8.0	6.0	7.0	11.0	12.0	12.0	8.0	6.0	7.0	8.0	102
Source: NOAA

== Demographics ==
Historical population
Census	Pop.	Note	%±
1880	628		—
1890	3,364		435.7%
1900	5,919		76.0%
1910	14,485		144.7%
1920	18,068		24.7%
1930	15,510		−14.2%
1940	16,763		8.1%
1950	18,899		12.7%
1960	20,944		10.8%
1970	18,996		−9.3%
1980	19,371		2.0%
1990	16,410		−15.3%
2000	15,333		−6.6%
2010	14,649		−4.5%
2020	13,942		−4.8%
U.S. Decennial Census; 1850-1870 1870-1880; 1890-1910 1920-1930; 1940 1950 1960; 1970 1980 1990; 2000 2010

=== 2020 census ===
As of the 2020 census, Waycross had a population of 13,942. The median age was 38.5 years; 26.5% of the residents were under 18 and 19.0% were 65 or older. For every 100 females, there were 85.2 males, and for every 100 females 18 and over, there were 78.9 males 18 and over.

Most of the residents lived in urban areas, while 2.2% lived in rural areas.

Of the 5,510 households (with 3,197 families) in Waycross, 32.0% had children under 18 living in them, 27.6% were married-couple households, 21.7% were households with a male householder and no spouse or partner present, and 43.8% were households with a female householder and no spouse or partner present. About 34.6% of all households were made up of individuals, and 15.3% had someone living alone who was 65 or older.

The city had 6,775 housing units, of which 18.7% were vacant. The homeowner vacancy rate was 4.1% and the rental vacancy rate was 8.5%.

Waycross racial composition as of 2020
Race	Number	Percentage
White	4,940	35.43%
Black or African American	7,672	55.03%
Native American	30	0.22%
Asian	138	0.99%
Pacific Islander	8	0.06%
Other/mixed	559	4.01%
Hispanics or Latinos	595	4.27%

== Media ==
- Waycross Journal-Herald discontinued, restarted as weekly paper(daily newspaper)
- The Florida Times-Union (Georgia Times-Union edition)
- Waycross Area Television Service (WATS) Channel 10

AM Radio

- WAYX AM 1230 (News-talk)
- WSFN AM 1350 (Sports)

FM Radio

- W201DK 88.1 (Christian)
- WXVS 90.1 (GPB and NPR)
- WASW 91.9 (Contemporary Christian)
- WAYX 96.3 Classic Rock) Simulcast with WSIZ
- WWUF 97.7 (Adult Contemporary)
- WYNR 102.5 (Country)
- WQGA 103.3 (Adult Contemporary)
- WKUB 105.1 (Country)
- WSGT 107.1 (Oldies)

=== Television ===
WXGA-TV, a Georgia Public Broadcasting outlet, is licensed to Waycross and also serves nearby Valdosta.

Waycross is part of the Jacksonville, Florida, television market.

== Health care ==
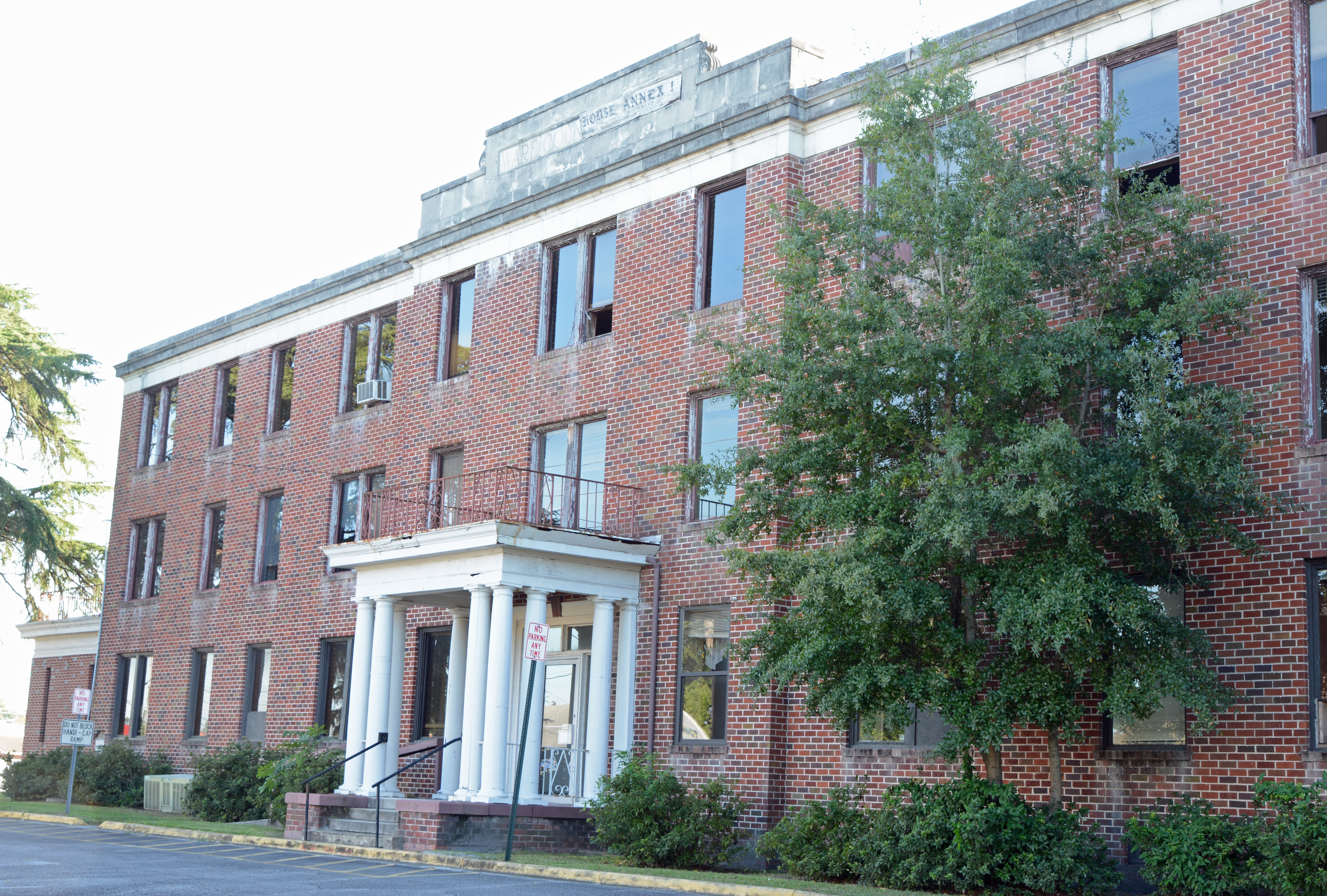
Front of the old hospital.

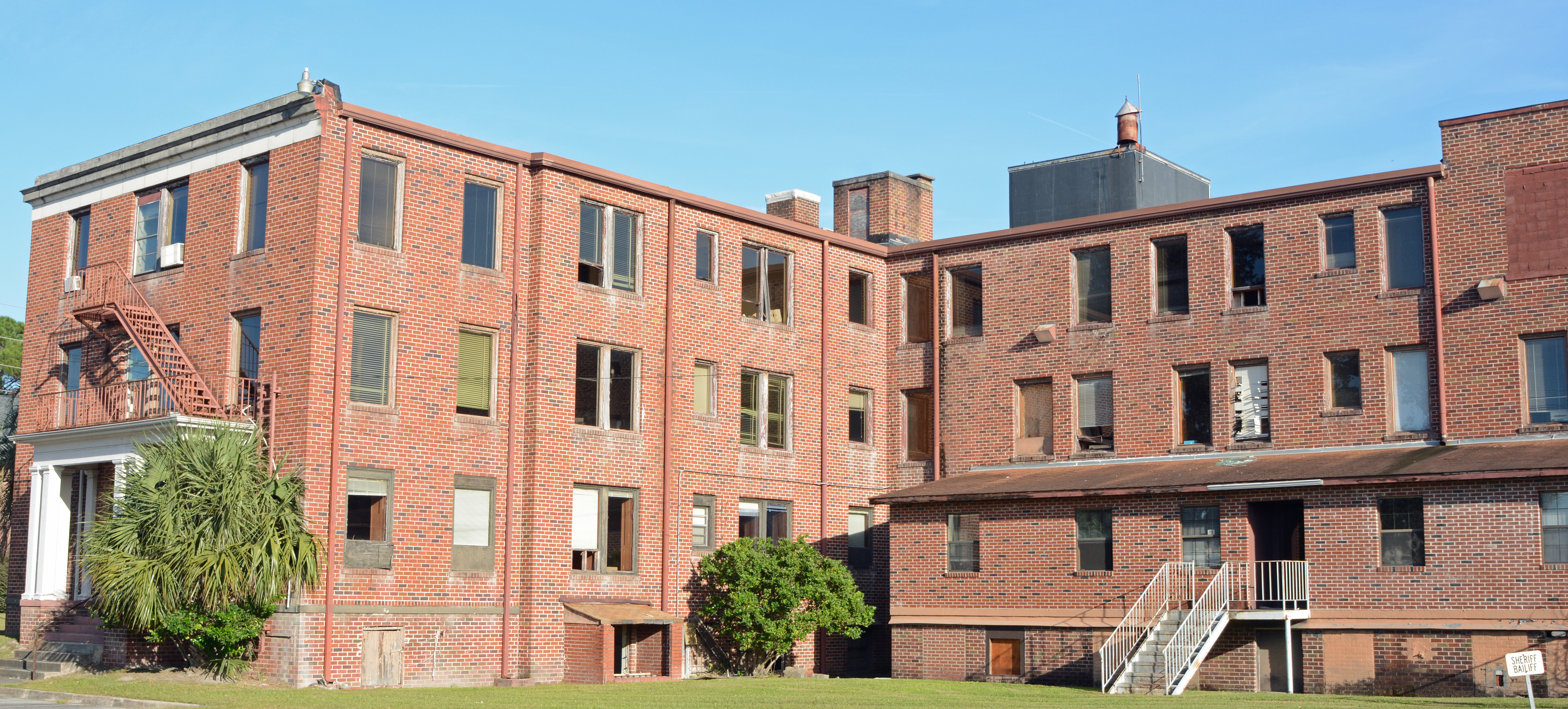
Back of the old hospital.

With over 100 employees and 10 physicians, Satilla Regional Medical Center is a leading center in health care in the area. The three-story facility has a trauma unit, cancer care unit, outpatient surgery, and imaging services. In 2012, Satilla Regional Medical Center joined the Mayo Clinic Health System and became the Mayo Clinic Health System in Waycross. The Mayo Clinic ceased operations at the hospital in 2015. The hospital later joined HCA Healthcare and has since been renamed Memorial Satilla Health.

== Education ==
=== Ware County School District ===
The Ware County School District offers preschool to grade 12, and consists of a preschool, six elementary schools, two middle schools, and one high school. The district has 431 full-time teachers and over 6,370 students.

=== Private education ===
- Southside Christian School (dissolved as of May 2024)
- Lighthouse Christian Academy (est. 2024)
- Discovery Montessori School
- St Joseph Academy operated from September 1948 to June 1976. Parochial school (K-8) affiliated with St Joseph's Catholic Church.

=== Higher education ===
- South Georgia State College - Waycross campus
- Coastal Pines Technical College - Waycross campus

== Transportation ==
U.S. Highway 1 runs north–south through Waycross, while concurrent with U.S. Highway 23. U.S. Highway 82 and U.S. Highway 84 run east–west through Waycross.

Waycross-Ware County Airport (IATA: AYS, ICAO: KAYS, FAA LID: AYS) is a public airport located three miles (5 km) northwest of the central business district of Waycross. The City of Waycross and Ware County own it.

Waycross had been a major junction on the Atlantic Coast Line Railroad (post-1967: Seaboard Coast Line Railroad); currently, those routes are operated by successor CSX. Tracks run from Waycross northeast to Jesup, east to Nahunta, southeast to Folkston, southwest to Valdosta, west to Axson and northwest (over pre-1946 tracks of the Atlanta, Birmingham and Coast Railroad) to Douglas. CSX operates Rice Yard, a major "hump" classification yard, here. Rice Yard is also home to CSX's largest locomotive and car shops.

== Notable people ==
- Johnny Archer — professional pool player, "The Scorpion"
- Michael P. Boggs — Chief Justice of the Supreme Court of Georgia and former judge on the Georgia Court of Appeals.
- Stanley Booth — author, journalist, music critic
- Billy Carter — brother of former President Jimmy Carter, promoter of Billy Beer
- Sonora Webster Carver — first woman horse diver
- Tommy Castellanos — quarterback at Florida State
- Ossie Davis — actor, writer, director, producer, Kennedy Center Honors award recipient, was born in Clinch County
- Nikki DeLoach — former member of The New Mickey Mouse Club, the girl group Innosense, and actress on the television series North Shore and Windfall
- Harry D. Dixon — state representative; served in the Georgia House of Representatives for 38 years; served on the board of the Georgia Department of Transportation
- Drayton Florence — professional football player, cornerback who played 11 seasons in NFL, highest draft pick ever from Tuskegee University
- Ernest Jones - professional football player for the Seattle Seahawks
- Tim McCray — professional football player from 1985 to 1990 in the CFL with the Saskatchewan Roughriders
- Leodis McKelvin — former cornerback in the NFL
- Caroline Pafford Miller — Pulitzer Prize-winning author
- Gram Parsons — country singer and musician; The Byrds, The Flying Burrito Brothers, and solo artist
- Pernell Roberts — actor, star of TV series Bonanza and Trapper John, M.D., was born in Waycross
- Bill Shanks — Atlanta Braves sportscaster
- Gerald Williams, former nose tackle for the Pittsburgh Steelers.
- Brenda Wilkinson — writer raised in Waycross whose Ludell books are set there

== See also ==
On the National Register of Historic Places:

- First African Baptist Church and Parsonage
- Lott Cemetery
- Phoenix Hotel
- United States Post Office and Courthouse
