= Downtown Waycross Historic District =

Historic district in Georgia, United States

- U.S. National Register of Historic Places
- U.S. Historic district
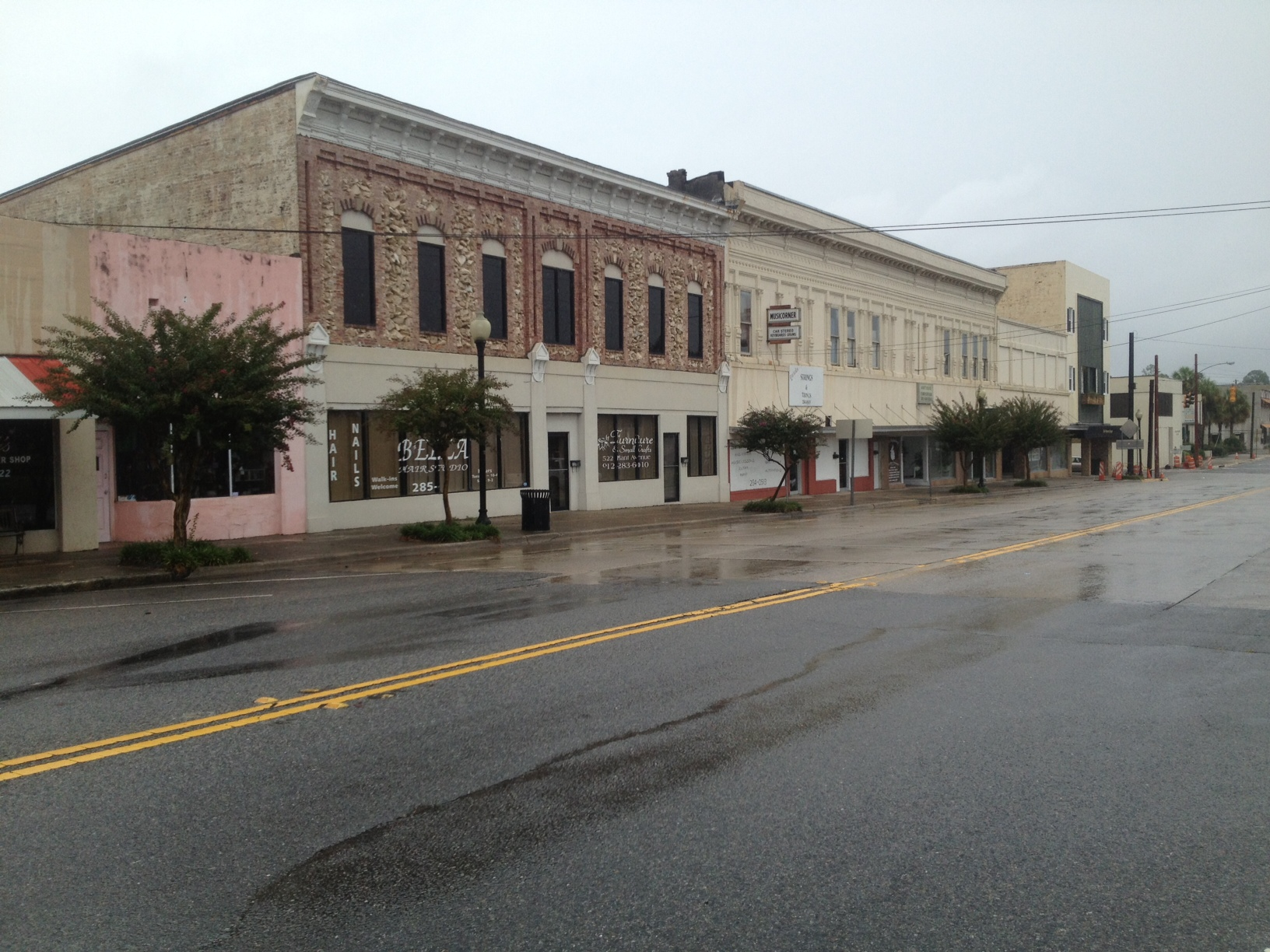

- Location within Georgia Location within the United States
- Location: Roughly bounded by the Seaboard Coast Line RR tracks and Albany, Isabella, Remshart and Nicholls Sts., Waycross, Georgia
- Coordinates: 31.209722°N 82.36°W
- Area: 50 acres (20 ha)
- Architect: Taylor, James Knox; Et al.
- Architectural style: Late 19th And 20th Century Revivals, Modern Movement, Italianate
- NRHP reference No.: 92000125
- Added to NRHP: March 20, 1992

The Downtown Waycross Historic District in Waycross, Georgia is a 50-acre (20 ha) historic district which was listed on the National Register of Historic Places in 1992.

It includes the Post Office, the Phoenix Hotel among totals of 47 contributing buildings, two other contributing structures, two contributing sites, and three contributing objects in the district.

Also the Bunn Building was Waycross's first "skyscraper", among the first reinforced concrete buildings in the state. It is a five-story building which was home for offices and a Masonic Lodge.

== See also ==
- Waycross Historic District, also NRHP-listed
