= First African Baptist Church and Parsonage (Waycross, Georgia) =

Historic church in Georgia, United States

- U.S. National Register of Historic Places
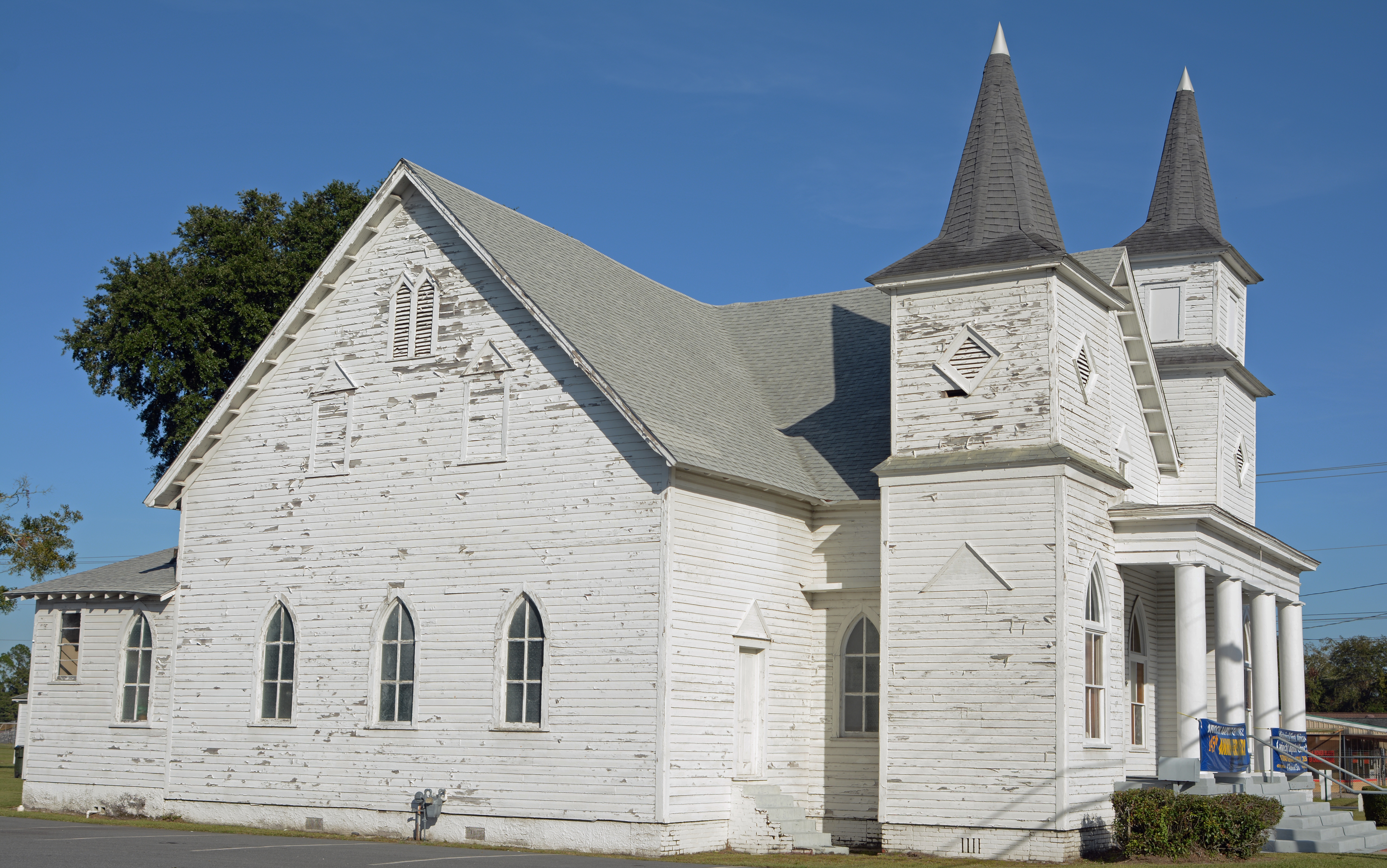
- Side view

- Location within Georgia Location within the United States
- Location: 615 Knight Ave. (church) and 407 Satilla Blvd. (parsonage), Waycross, Georgia
- Coordinates: 31.21021°N 82.34336°W
- Area: less than one acre
- Built: c. 1905, c. 1910
- Architectural style: Gothic Revival, Queen Anne
- NRHP reference No.: 03000197
- Added to NRHP: April 11, 2003

First African Baptist Church and Parsonage is a historic church and its parsonage in a traditionally African-American neighborhood of Waycross, Georgia. The church is now known as First Antioch Missionary Baptist Church. The property was added to the National Register of Historic Places on April 11, 2003. It is located at 615 Knight Street and 407 Satilla Boulevard.

The church was constructed c. 1905 and is Gothic Revival in style, wood-framed on a brick pier foundation. The front entrance to the church was changed sometime before 1957. The parsonage, built c. 1910, is a Queen Anne cottage with clapboard siding.

== Photos ==
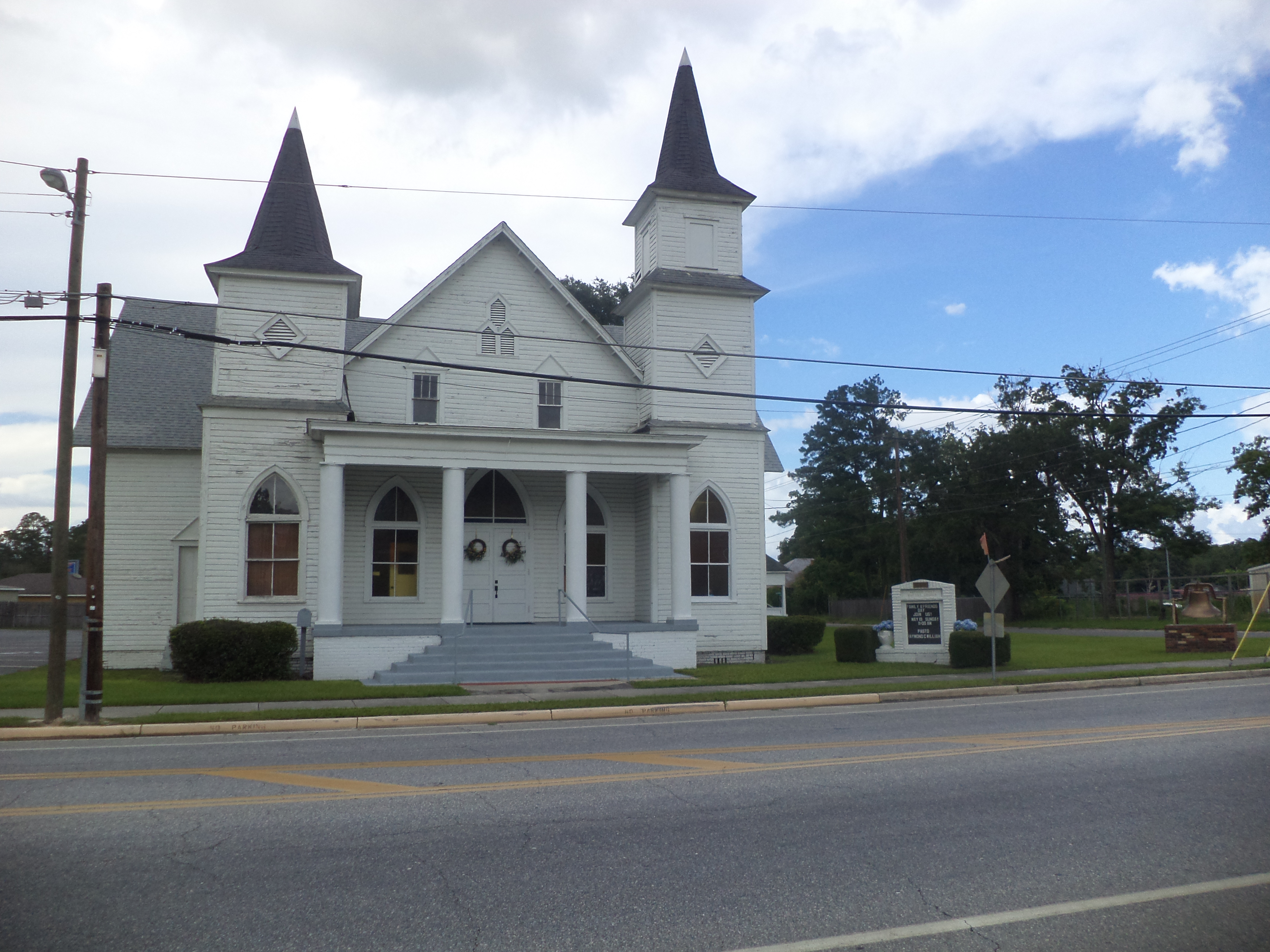
Front

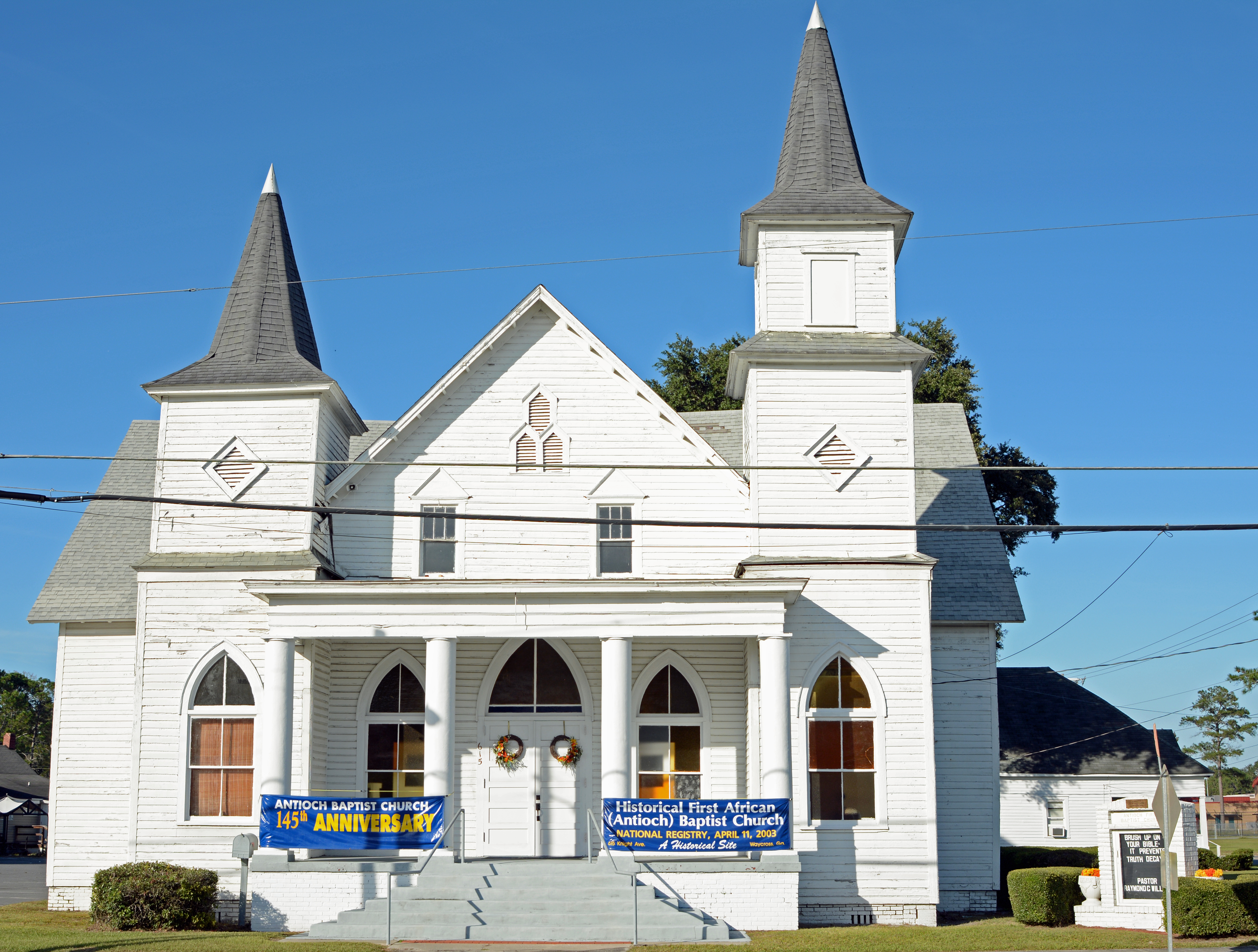
Front (parsonage behind on the right)

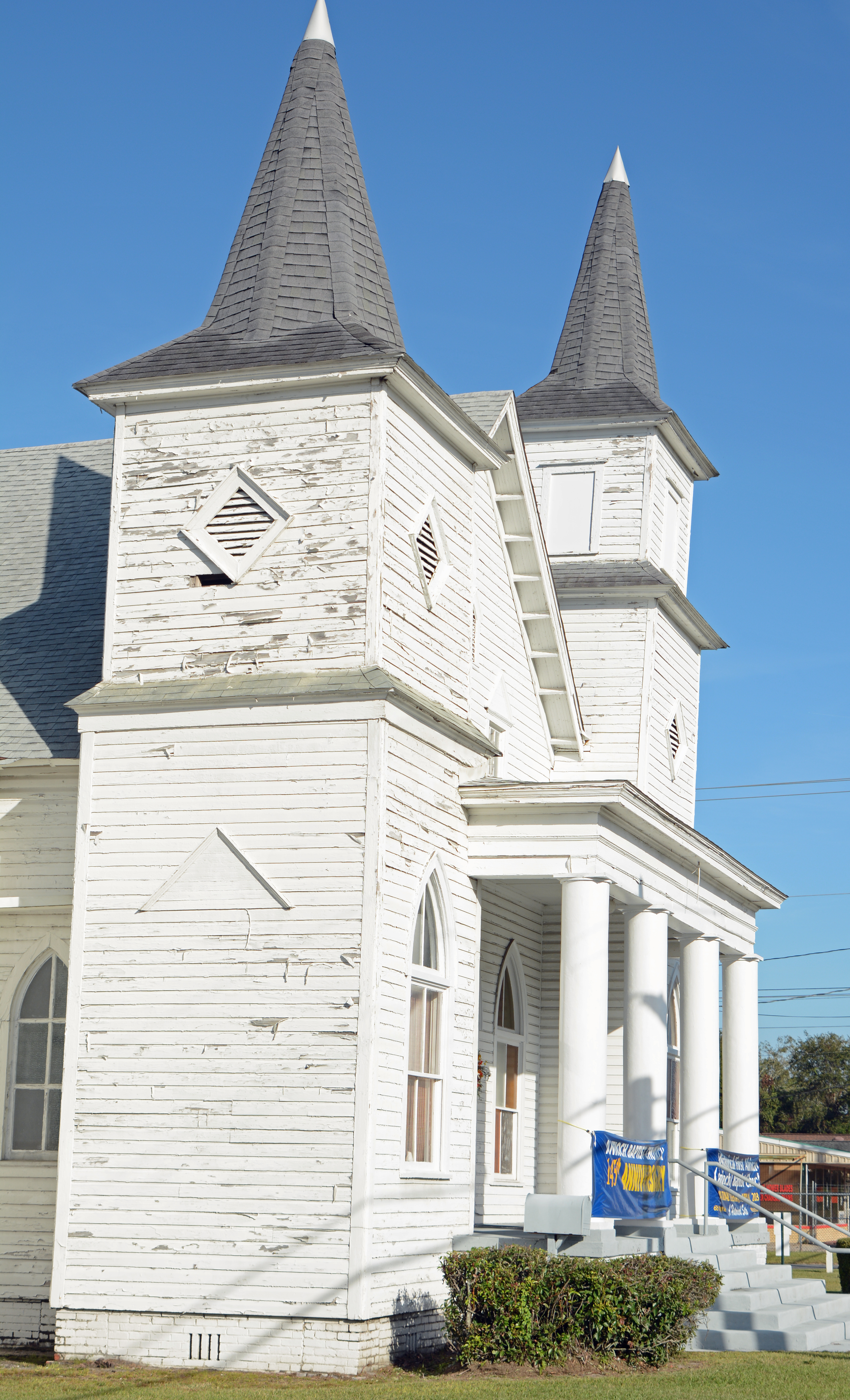
Corner

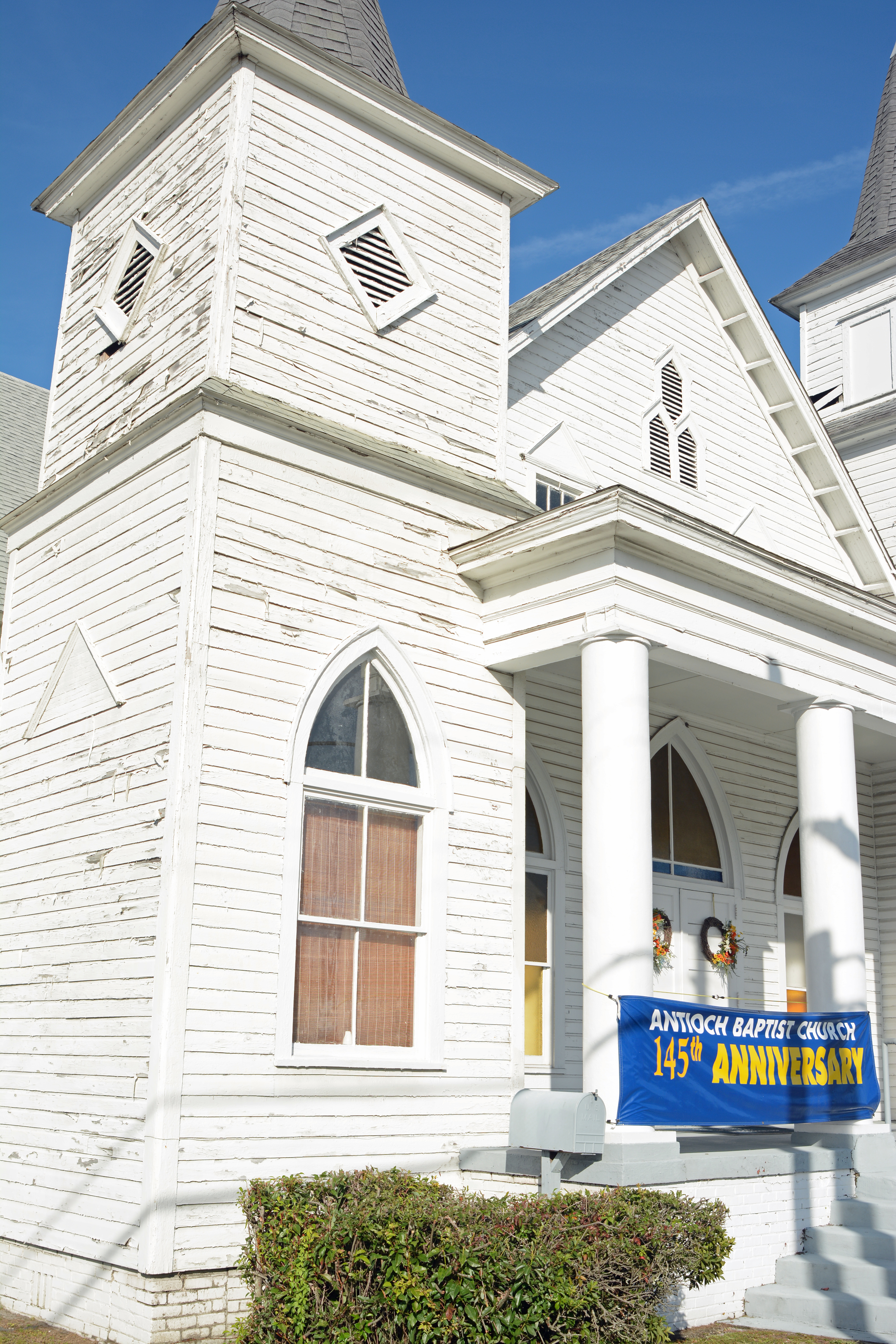
Corner detail

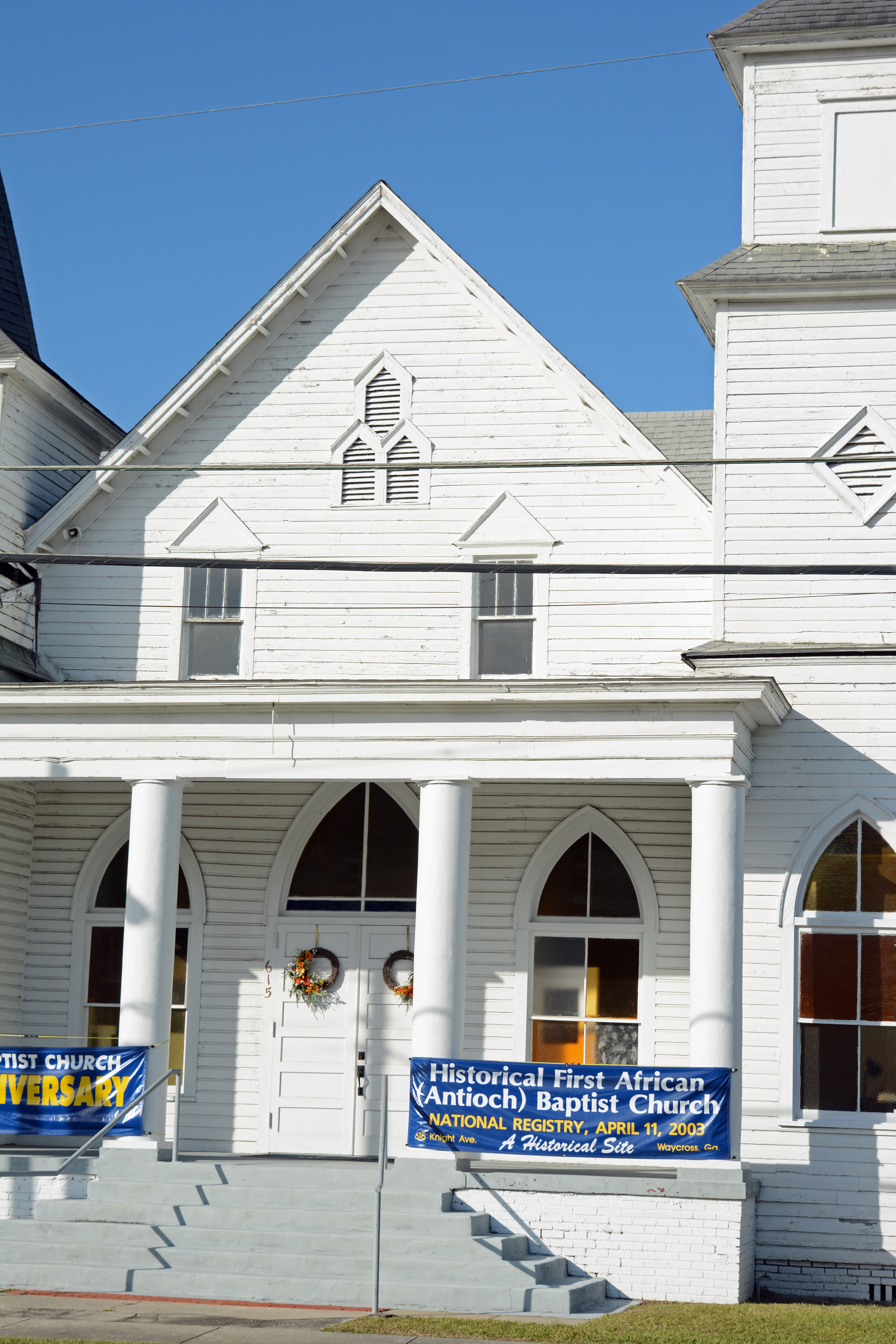
Closer view of the front

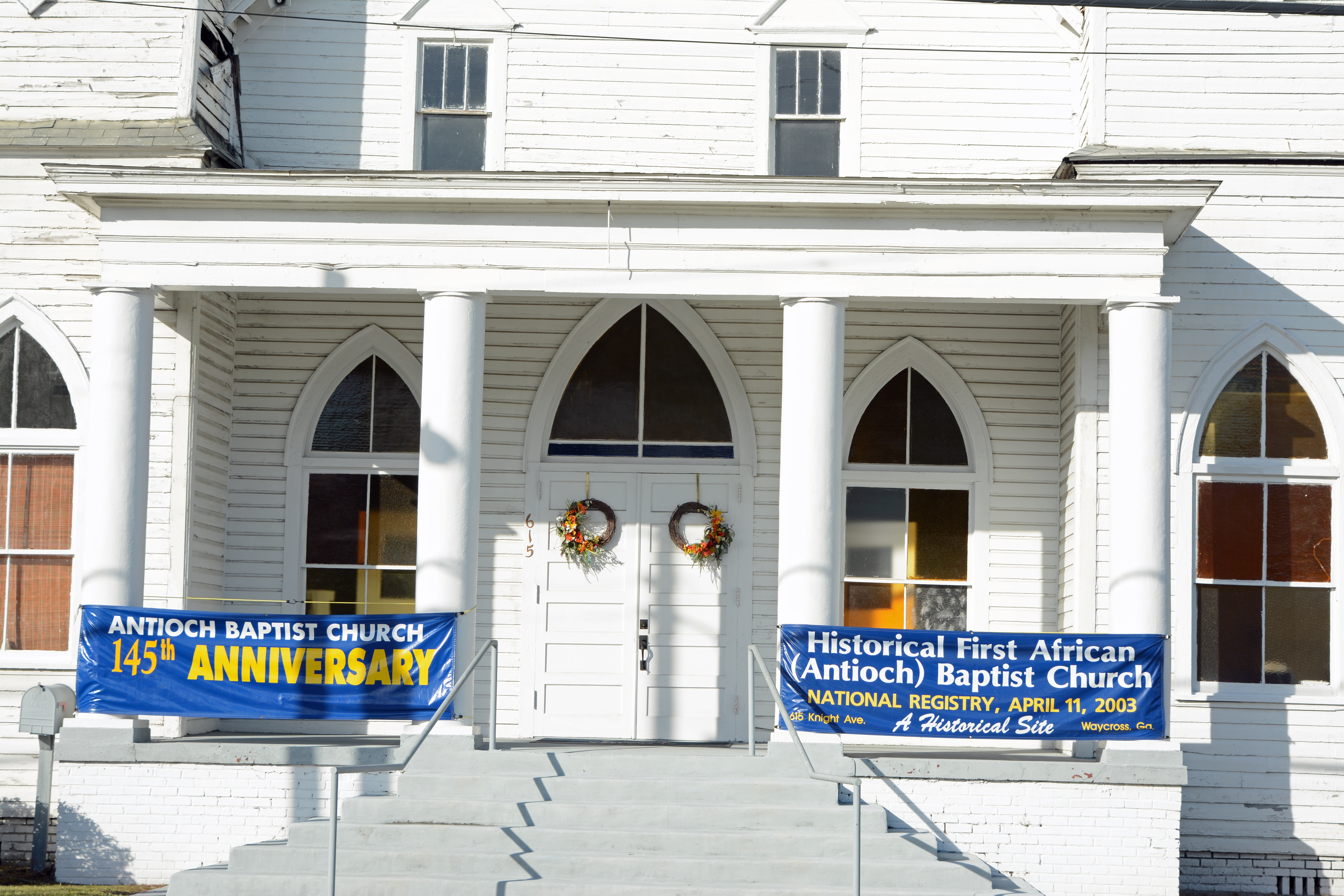
Entrance

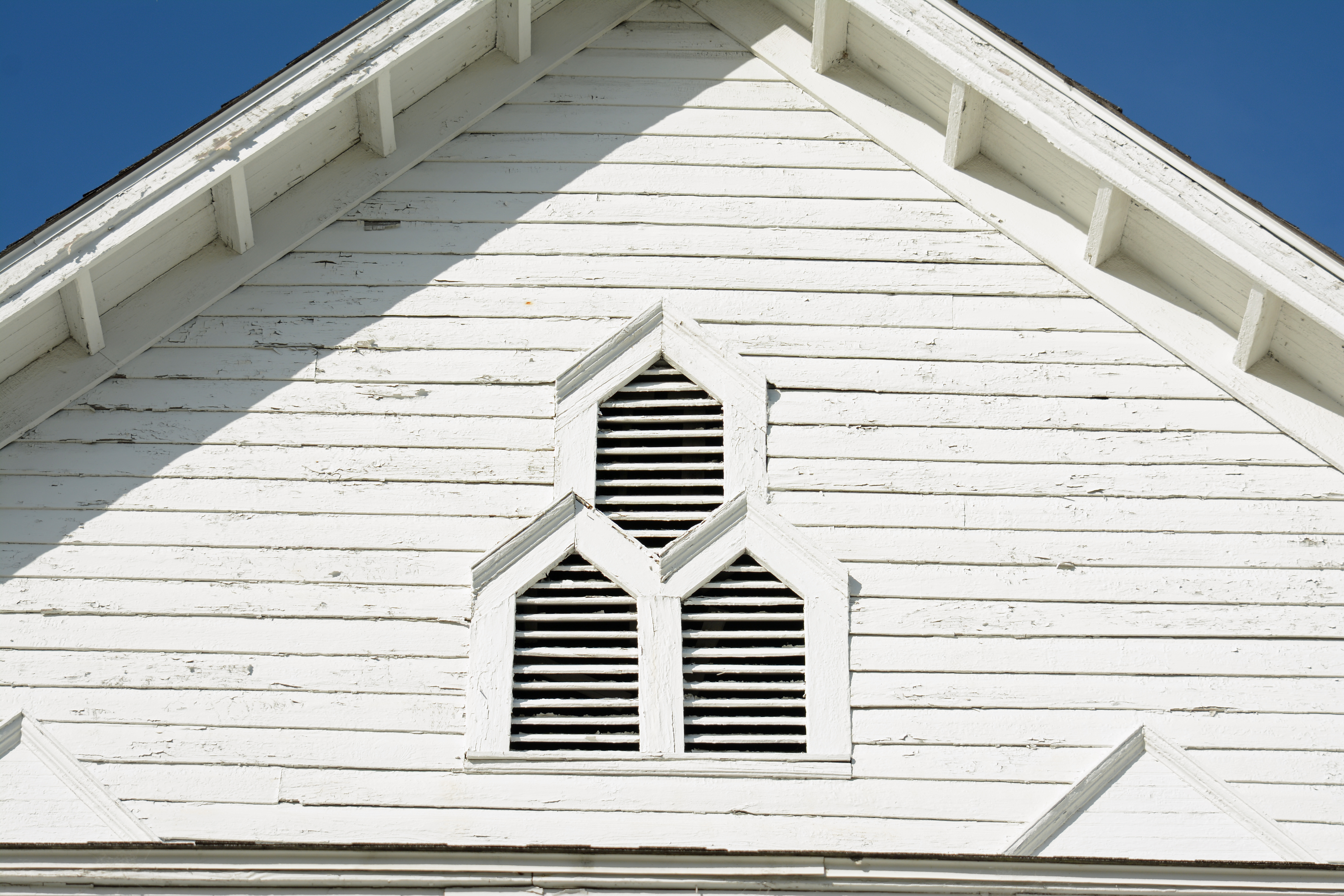
Detail above entrance

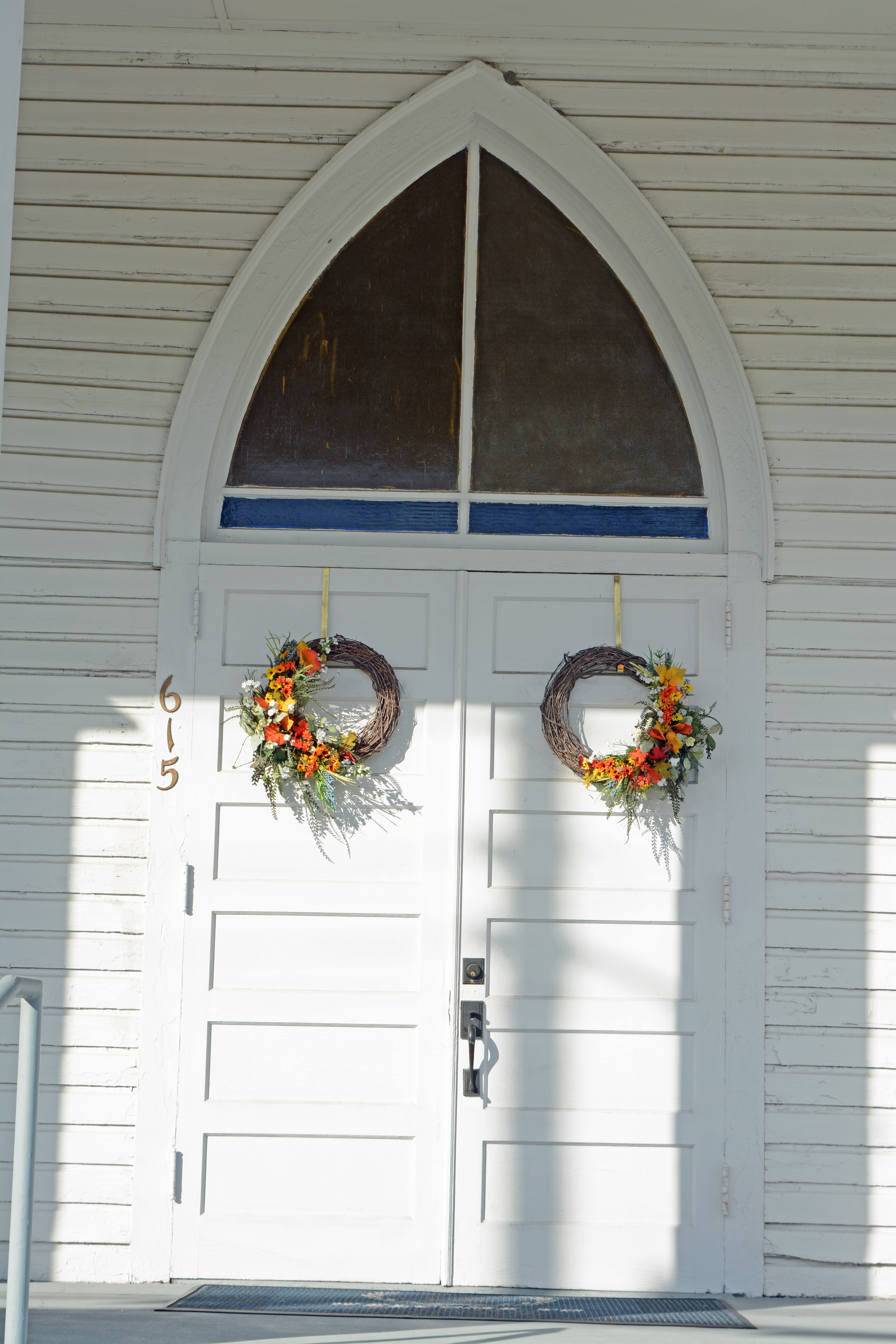
Front door

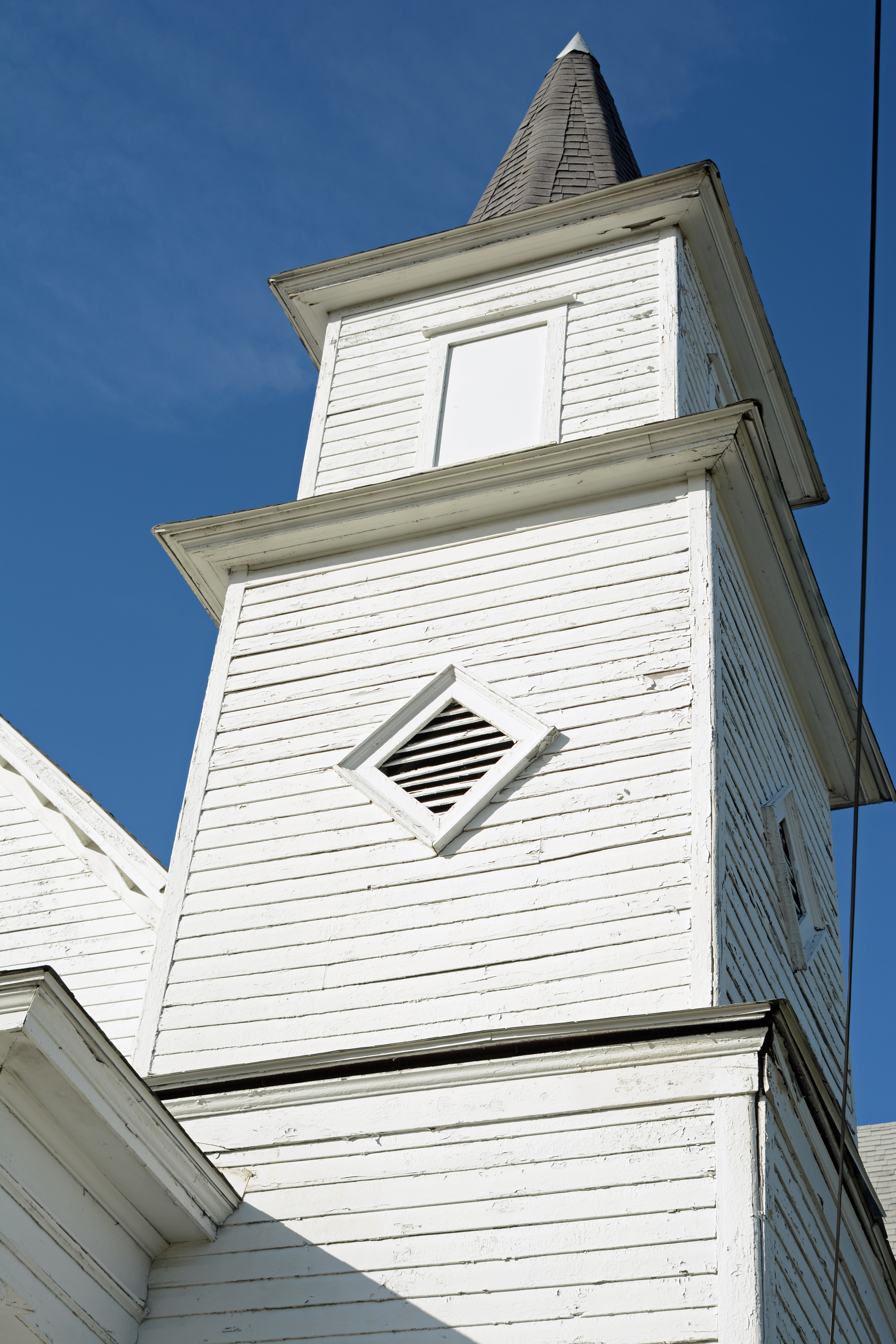
Spire detail

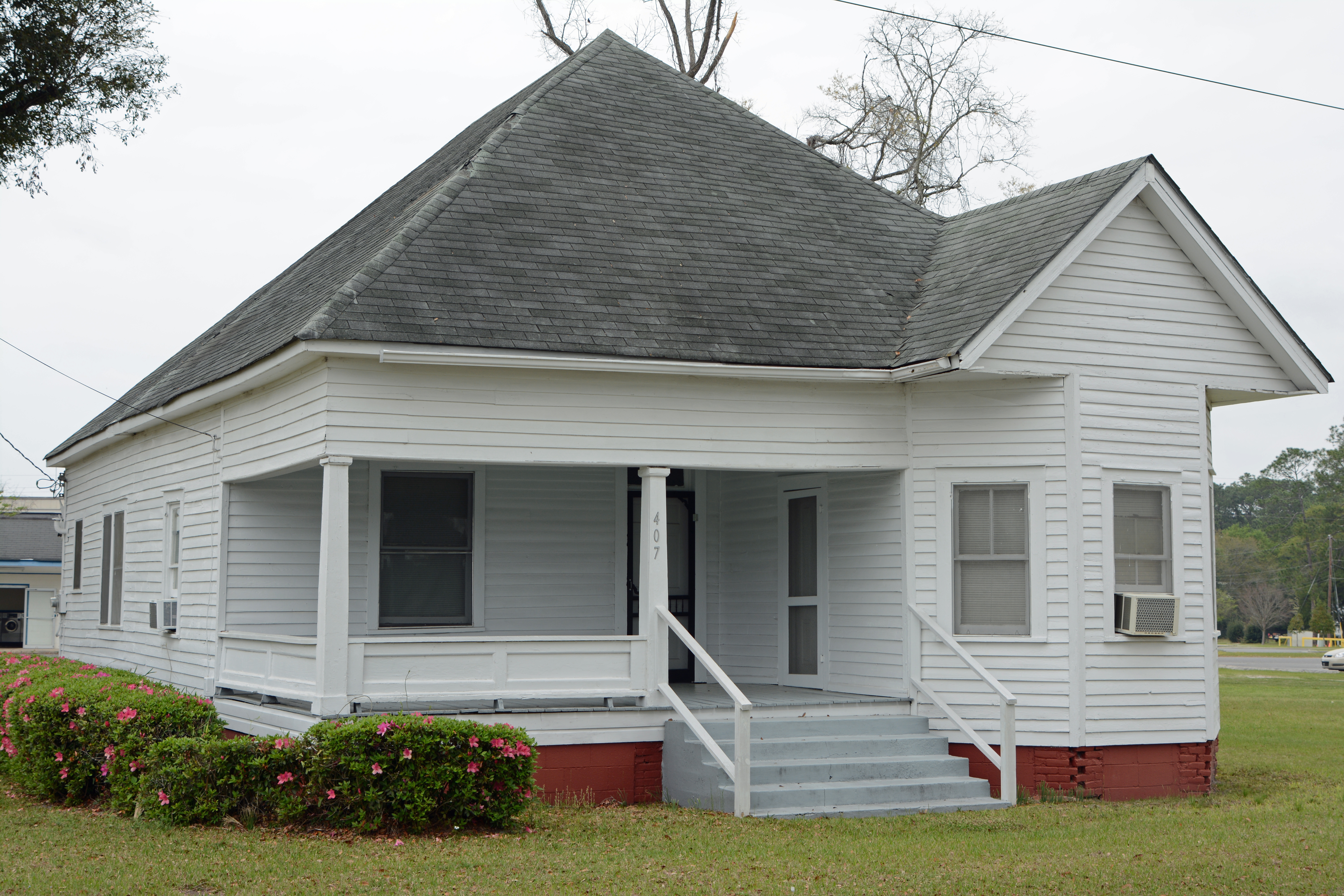
The parsonage

== See also ==
- National Register of Historic Places listings in Ware County, Georgia
