= Manor School (Manor, Georgia) =

- U.S. National Register of Historic Places
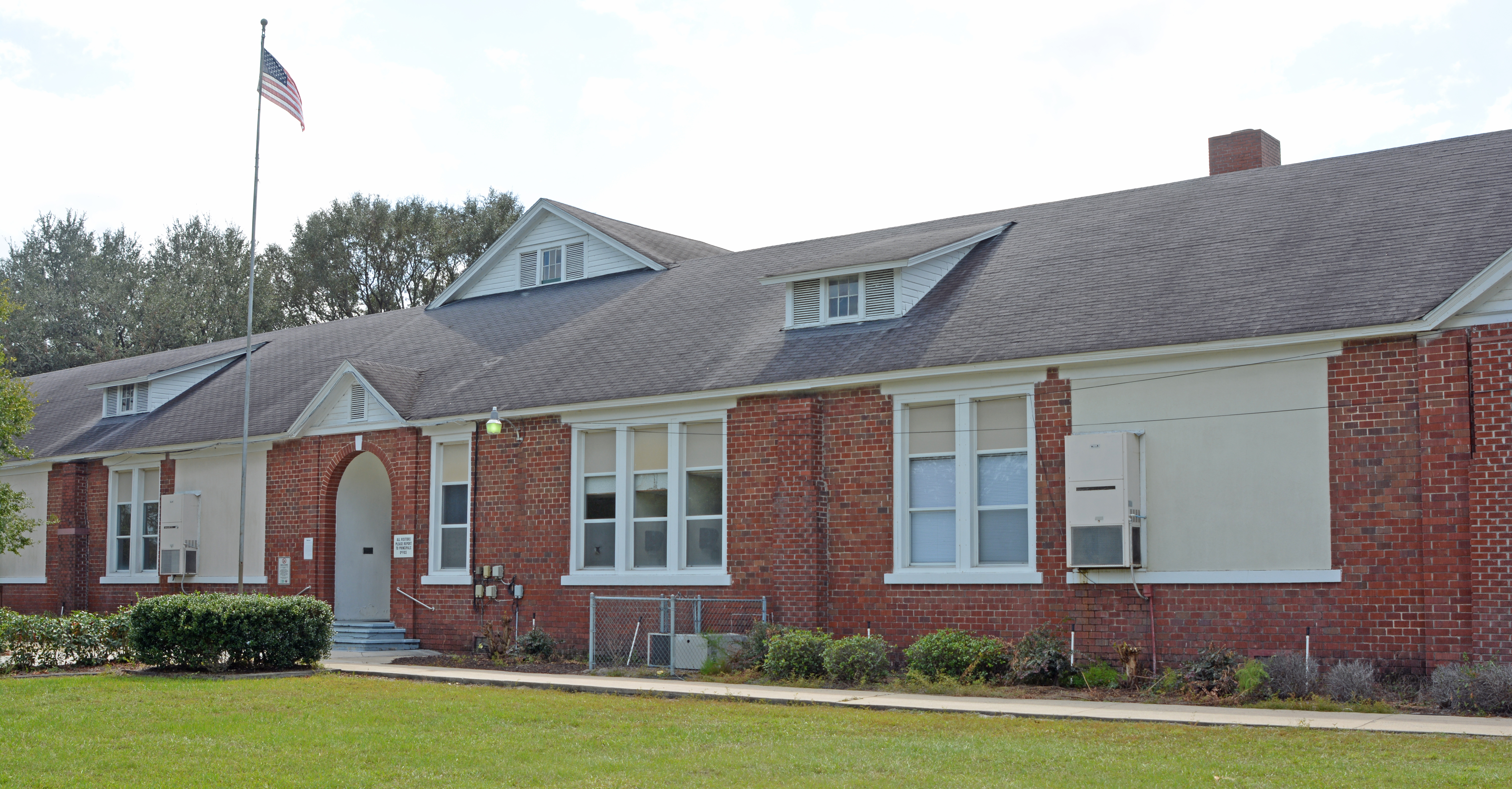
- The Manor School in 2017

- Location within Georgia
- Location: 4650 Manor Millwood Rd., Manor, Georgia
- Coordinates: 31.10491°N 82.57428°W
- Area: 24 acres (9.7 ha)
- Built: 1937, 1956, 1959, 1964
- NRHP reference No.: 100001310
- Added to NRHP: July 17, 2017

The Manor School, located at 4650 Manor Millwood Rd. in Manor in Ware County, Georgia, was listed on the National Register of Historic Places in 2017.

The listed property is 24 acres (9.7 ha) and includes five contributing buildings and a historic athletic field. A newspaper reported that it was deemed "significant in the area of architecture, as a good intact example of a rural consolidated public school building with elements of the Colonial Revival style that was later expanded with an International Style addition; and in the area of education, for its association with public education in Manor, according to the press release."

The main school building was built with Works Project Administration funding in 1937 and has an E-shaped plan. A kitchen and cafeteria building was built in 1956, a gymnasium was built in 1959, and a special education classroom building was built in 1964. The latter includes International Style elements. The school was the area high school until 1969, and the school was closed in 2010.
