= Axson =

Axson is a surname. Notable people with the surname include:

- Antonia Ax:son Johnson (born 1943), Swedish businesswoman
- Eleanor Axson Sayre (1916–2001), American curator and art historian
- Ellen Axson Wilson (1860–1914), First Lady of the United States from 1913 to 1914
- Rob Axson, American political operative

== See also ==
- Ax:son Johnson family
- Axson, Georgia
