= Waycross Historic District =

Historic district in Georgia, United States

- U.S. National Register of Historic Places
- U.S. Historic district
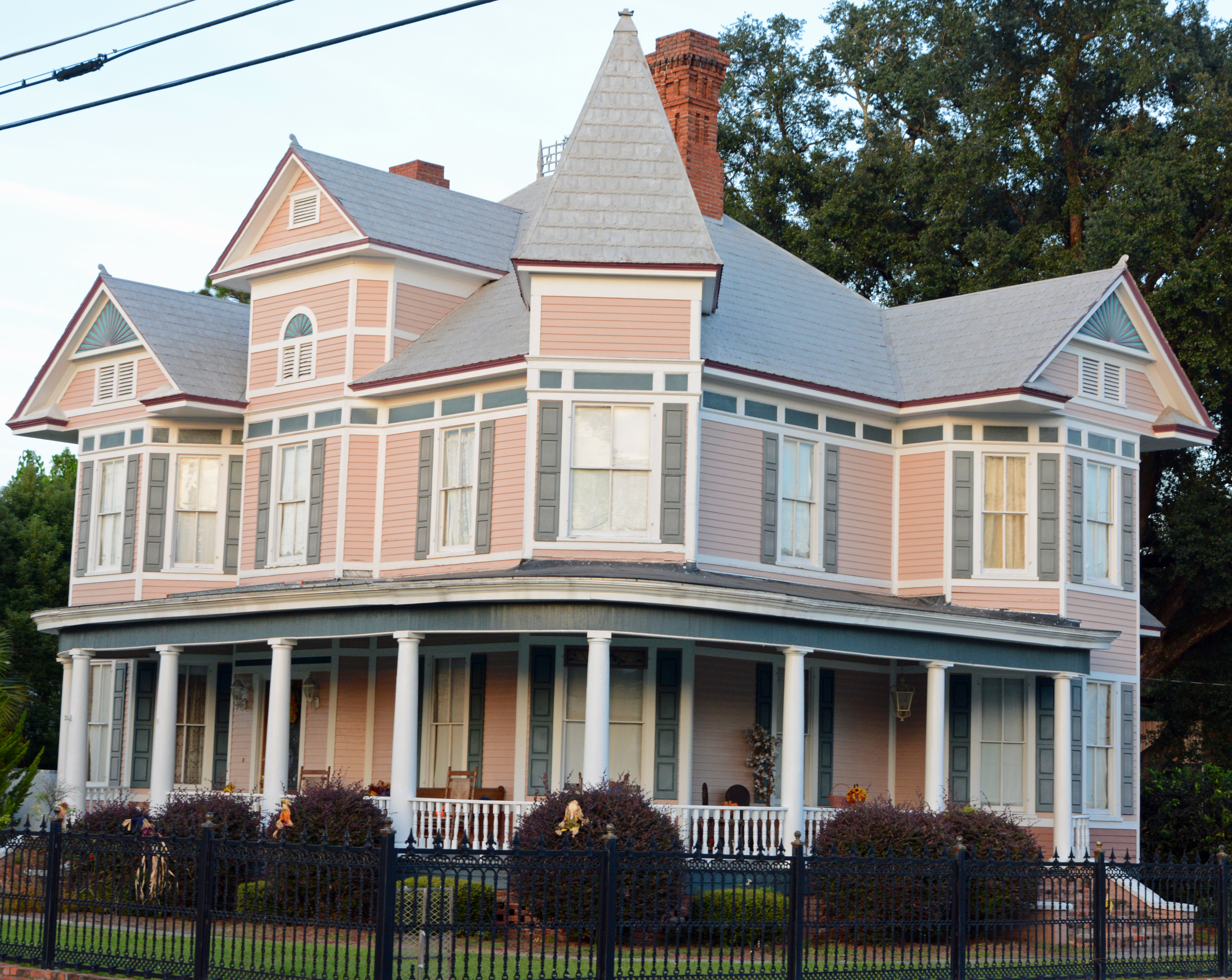
- Summerall Tillman Home, Gilmore St.

- Location within Georgia Location within the United States
- Location: Roughly bounded by Plant Ave., Williams, Lee, Chandler, and Stephen Sts., Waycross, Georgia
- Coordinates: 31.205278°N 82.354444°W
- Area: 178 acres (72 ha)
- Built: 1895
- Architectural style: Late Victorian, Second Empire
- NRHP reference No.: 76000656
- Added to NRHP: June 29, 1976

The Waycross Historic District is a 178-acre (72 ha) historic district which was listed on the National Register of Historic Places in 1976.

The district then included 237 contributing buildings and one contributing structure.

== See also ==
- Downtown Waycross Historic District
