= United States Post Office and Courthouse (Waycross, Georgia) =

Historic post office in Georgia, US

- U.S. Post Office and Courthouse
- U.S. National Register of Historic Places
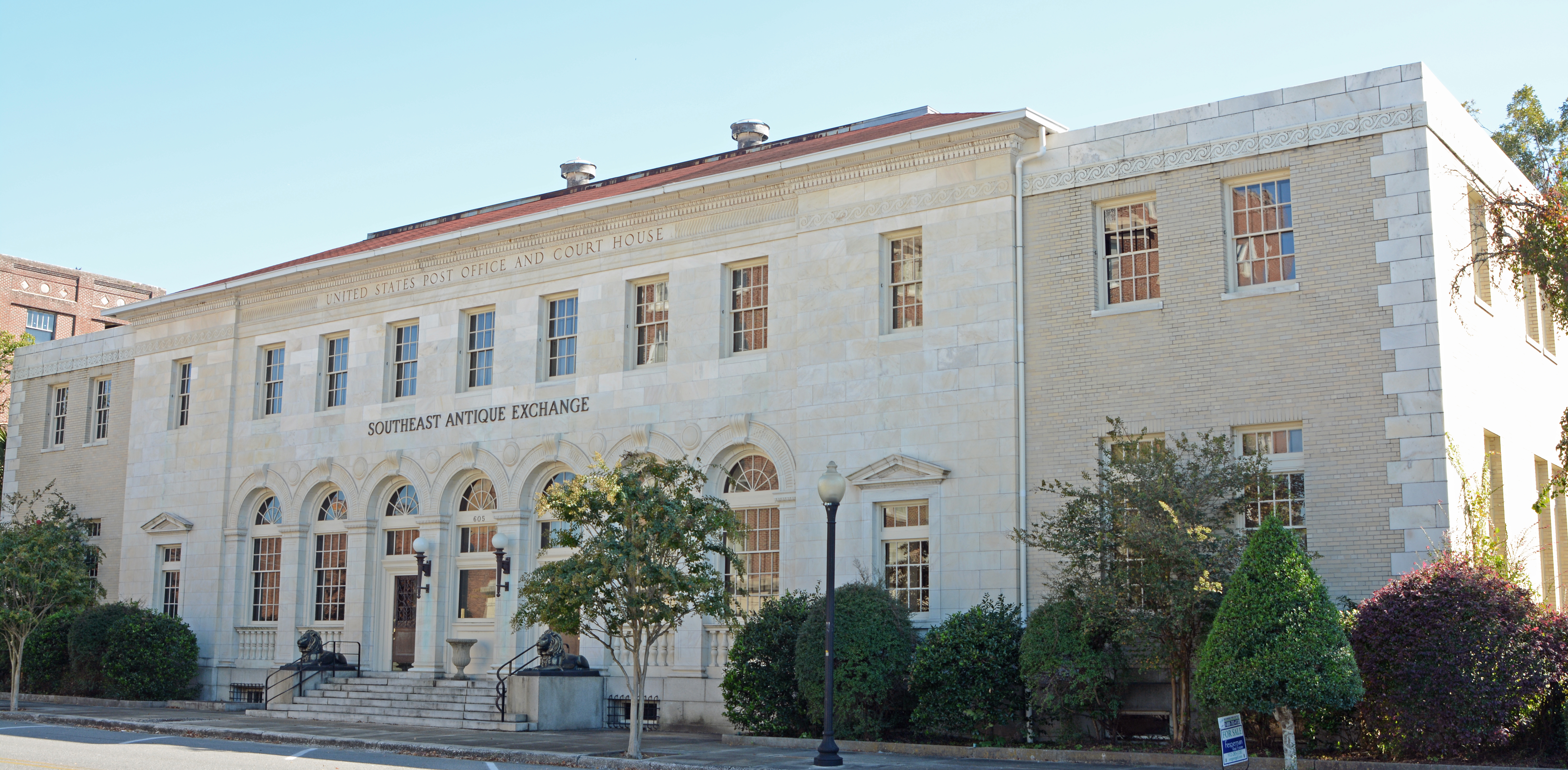

- Location within Georgia Location within the United States
- Location: 605 Elizabeth St., Waycross, Georgia
- Coordinates: 31°12′34″N 82°21′41.5″W
- Area: 0.5 acres (0.20 ha)
- Built: 1911, 1936
- Built by: Dice-Schmidt Construction Co.
- Architect: James Knox Taylor (original); G. W. Stone (1936 addition)
- Engineer: Allen, Lucius E.
- Architectural style: Renaissance, Romano-Tuscan
- NRHP reference No.: 80001258
- Added to NRHP: February 1, 1980

The former U.S. Post Office and Courthouse in Waycross, Georgia was built in 1911 and expanded in 1936. It is occupied in 2016 by the Southeast Antique Exchange business. The building reflects Renaissance architecture and "Romano-Tuscan" architecture. It served historically as a courthouse of the United States District Court for the Southern District of Georgia and as a post office until 1975.

It is a two-story building with basement of approximately 21,700 square feet in size. The original building of 1911, designed by James Knox Taylor, was one story with basement and with a tile roof. The 1936 expansion, designed by G. W. Stone, added the second story and two-story wings at each end, and has a composition roof. Floors in the building are terrazzo and maple hardwood, except the second floor courtroom's floor is cork tile. Stairs, door facings and wainscoting are in marble. Woodwork is oak.

The building was listed on the National Register of Historic Places in 1980. It was only ever used as a courthouse and post office, and the building had been empty from 1975 until at least 1980. It now houses the Southeast Antique Exchange.

== Photos ==
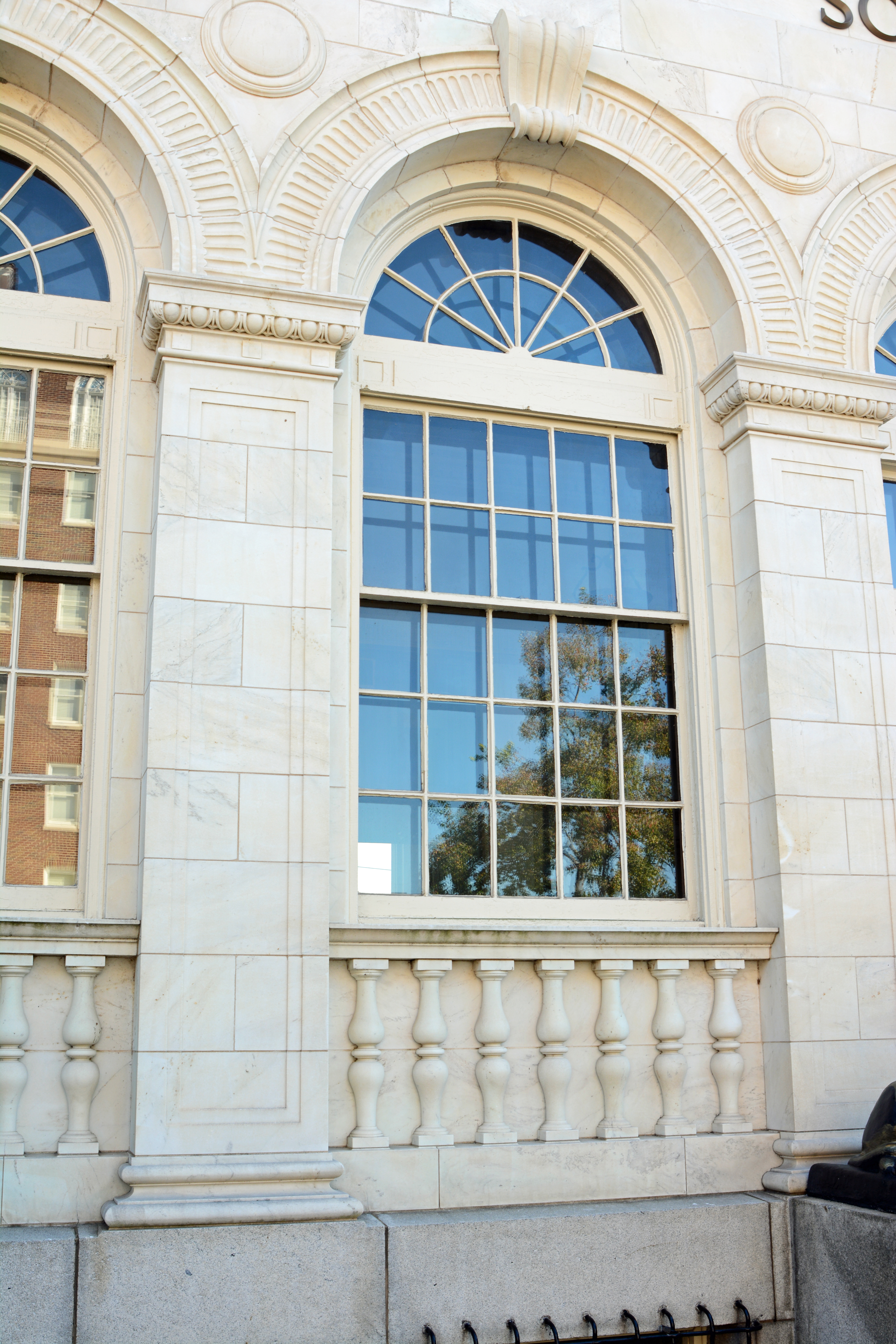
Window

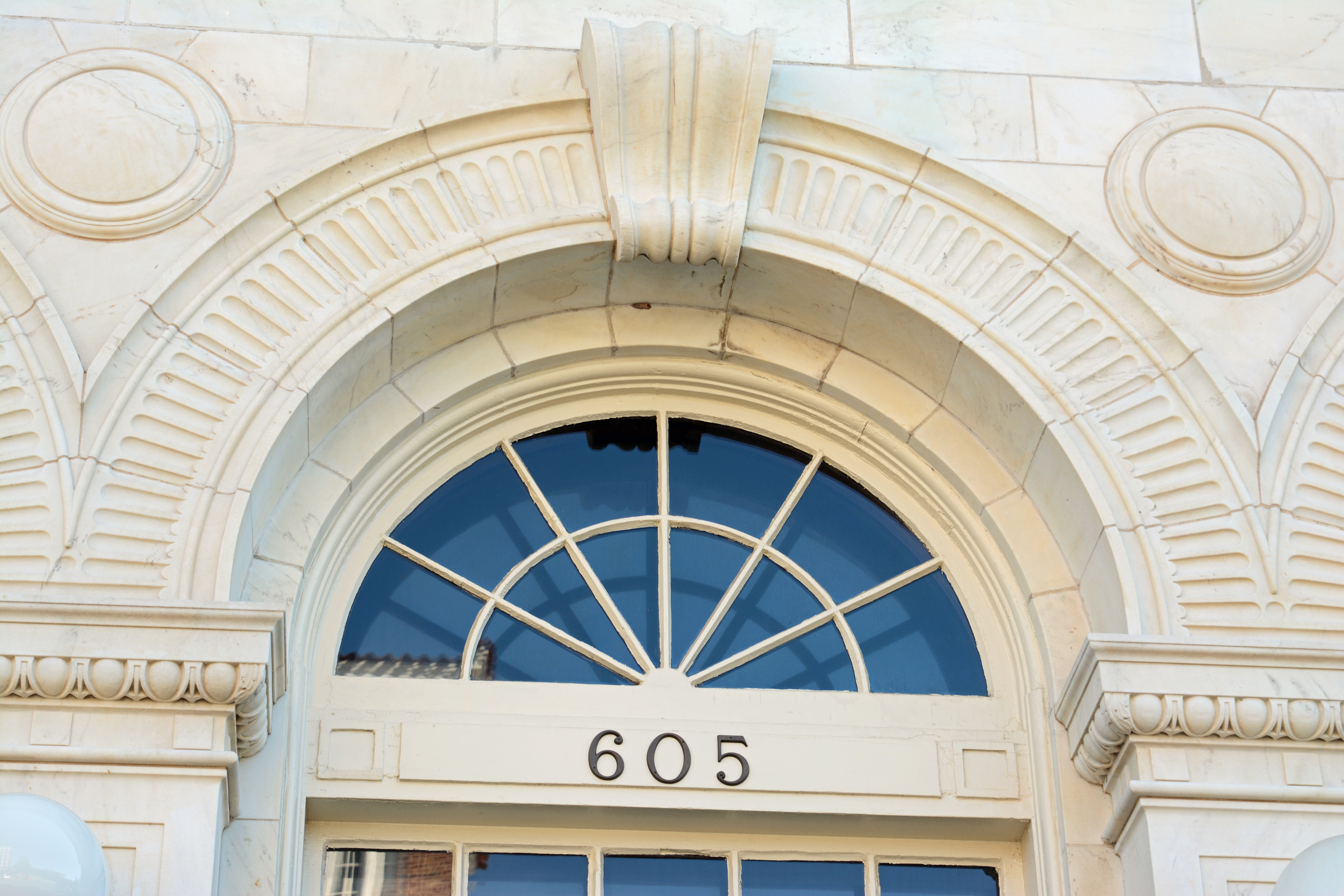
Detail above window

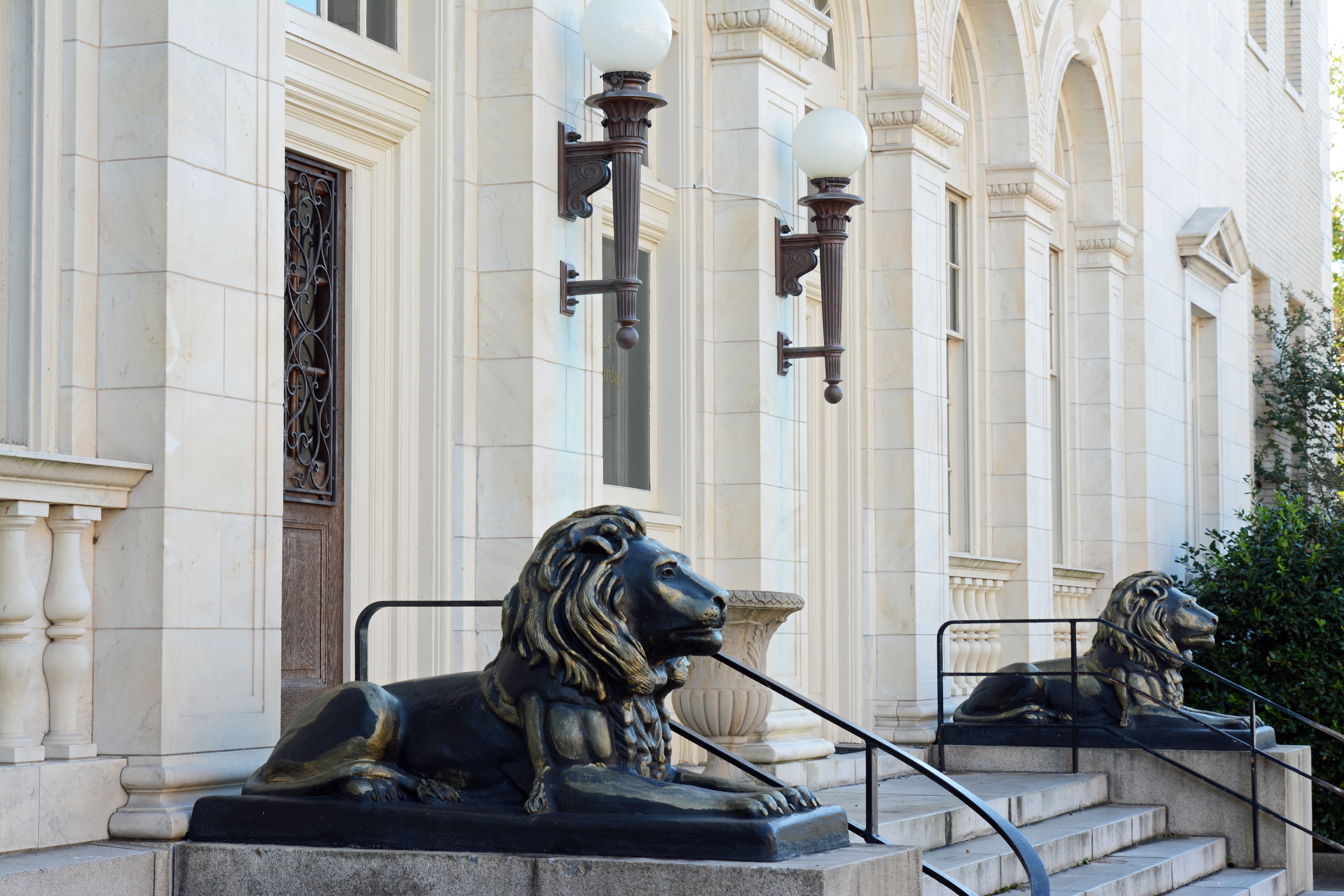
Entrance

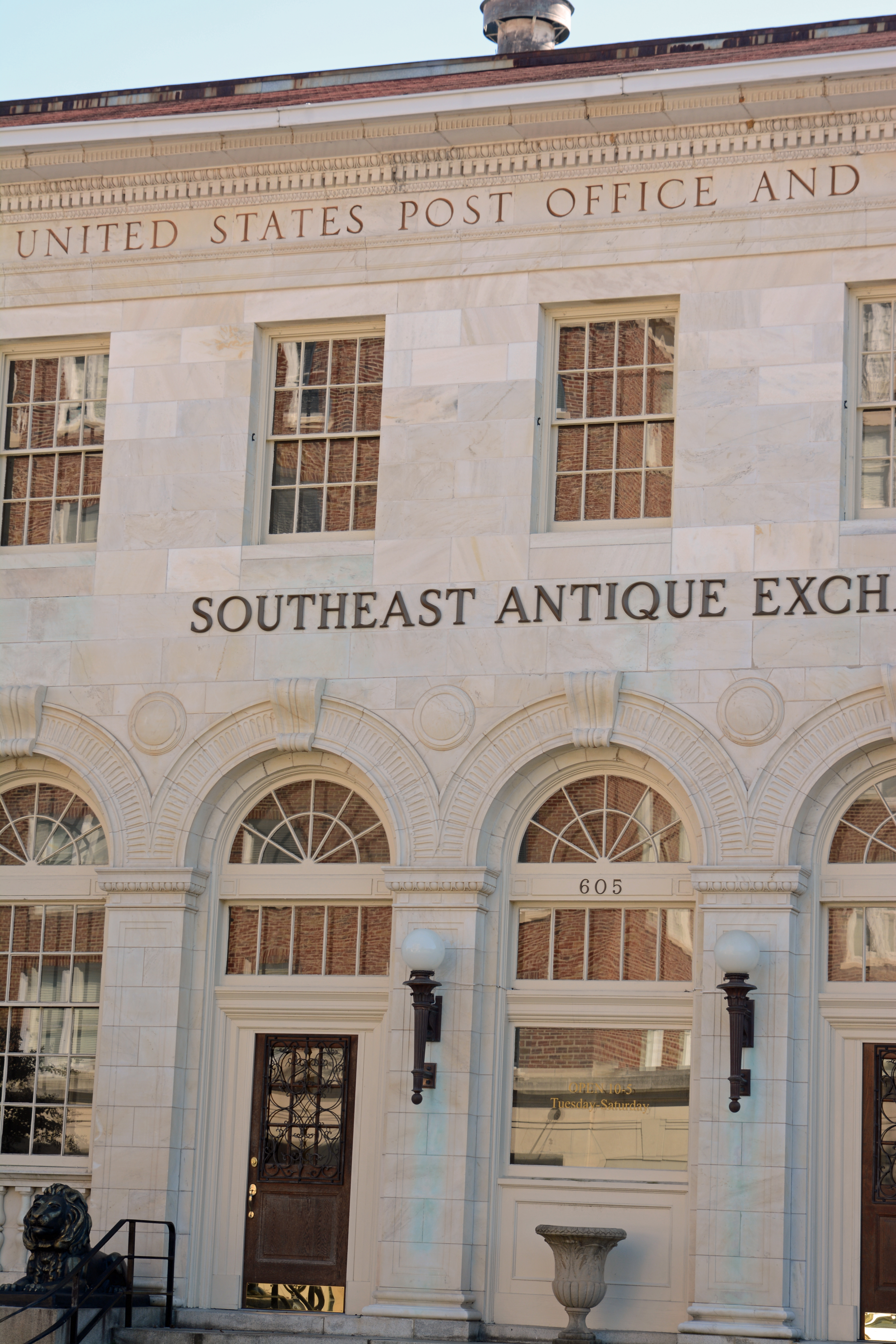
Vertical shot of the front

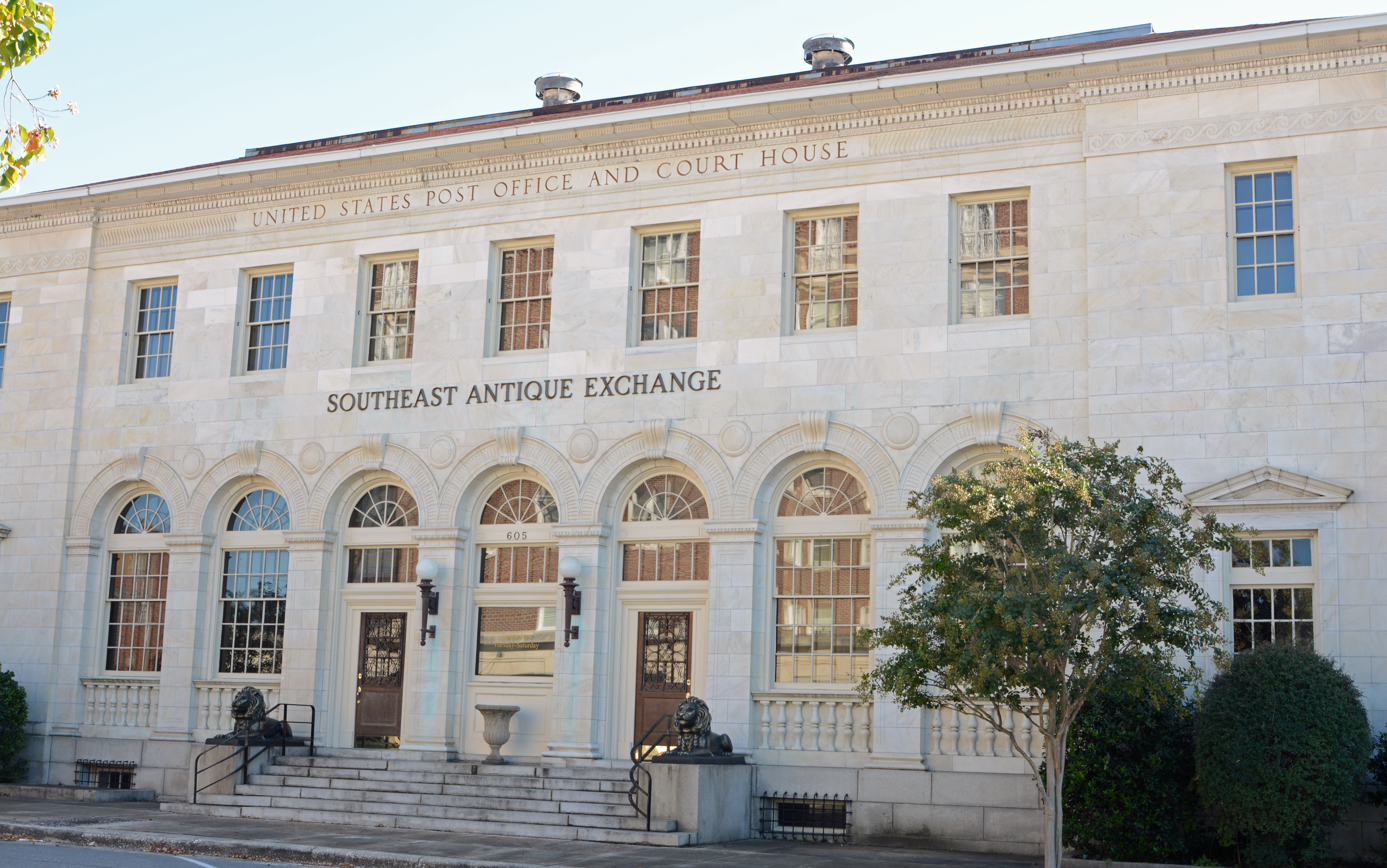
Original 1911 part

== See also ==
- List of United States post offices
