= Phoenix Hotel (Waycross, Georgia) =

Hotel built around 1890 in Georgia, USA

- U.S. National Register of Historic Places
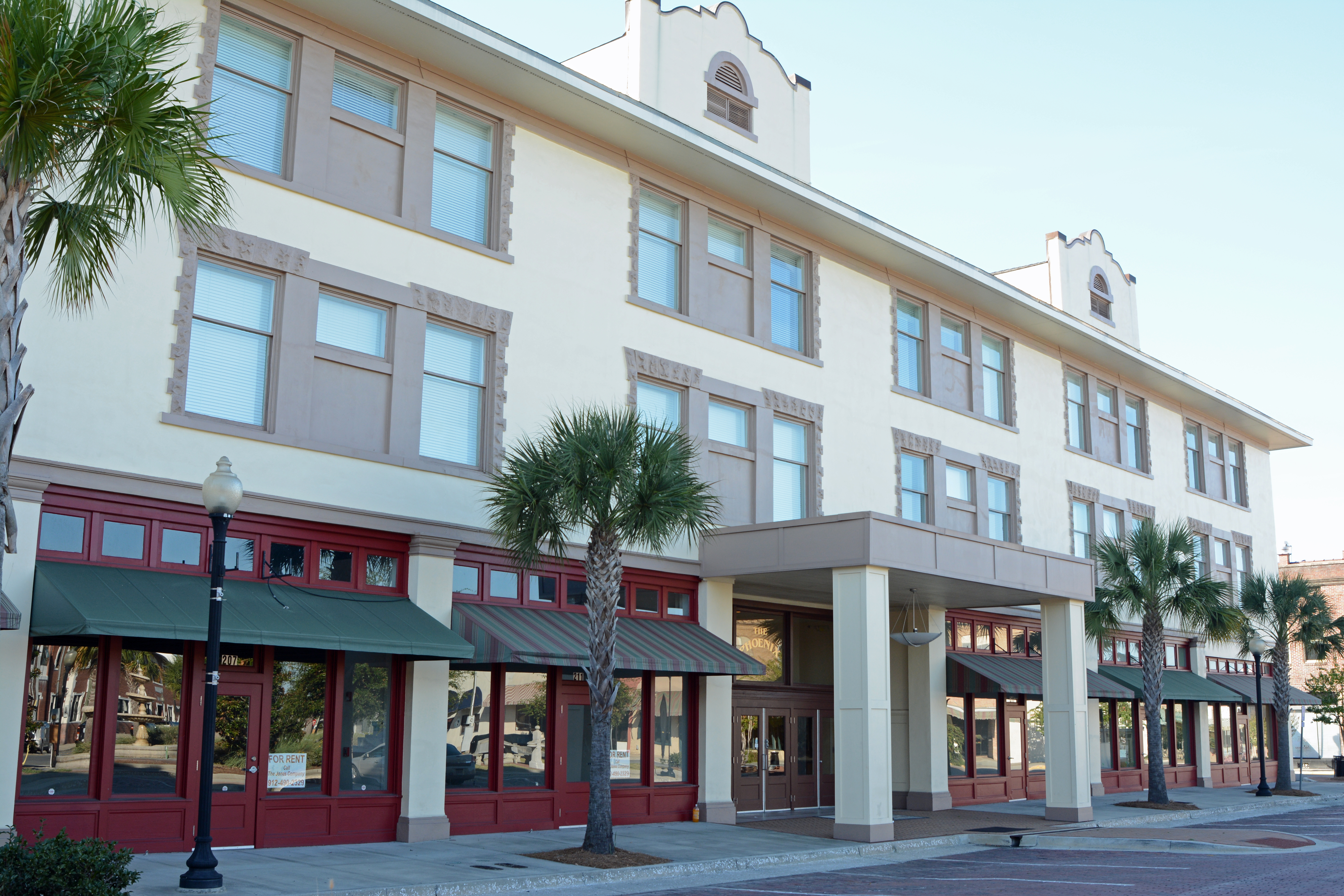
- Front of the hotel

- Location within Georgia Location within the United States
- Location: 201 – 222 Pendleton St., Waycross, Georgia
- Coordinates: 31.20925°N 82.36020°W
- Area: 0.6 acres (0.24 ha)
- Built: 1890
- Built by: Parker, Virgil C. (1913 remodel)
- Architectural style: Mission Revival/Spanish Revival
- NRHP reference No.: 86000802
- Added to NRHP: April 17, 1986

The Phoenix Hotel (originally the "New Phoenix") is a historic hotel in Waycross, Georgia, built about 1890. It is a three-story brick building that occupies a 200 by 111 feet (61 m × 34 m) block of the city. Businesses occupied the first floor, which has been modernized, but the other two floors retain their original configuration. The building originally had two stories and the third floor was added in 1913. It is near the train depot and catered to travelers. It was added to the National Register of Historic Places in 1986.

== Photos ==
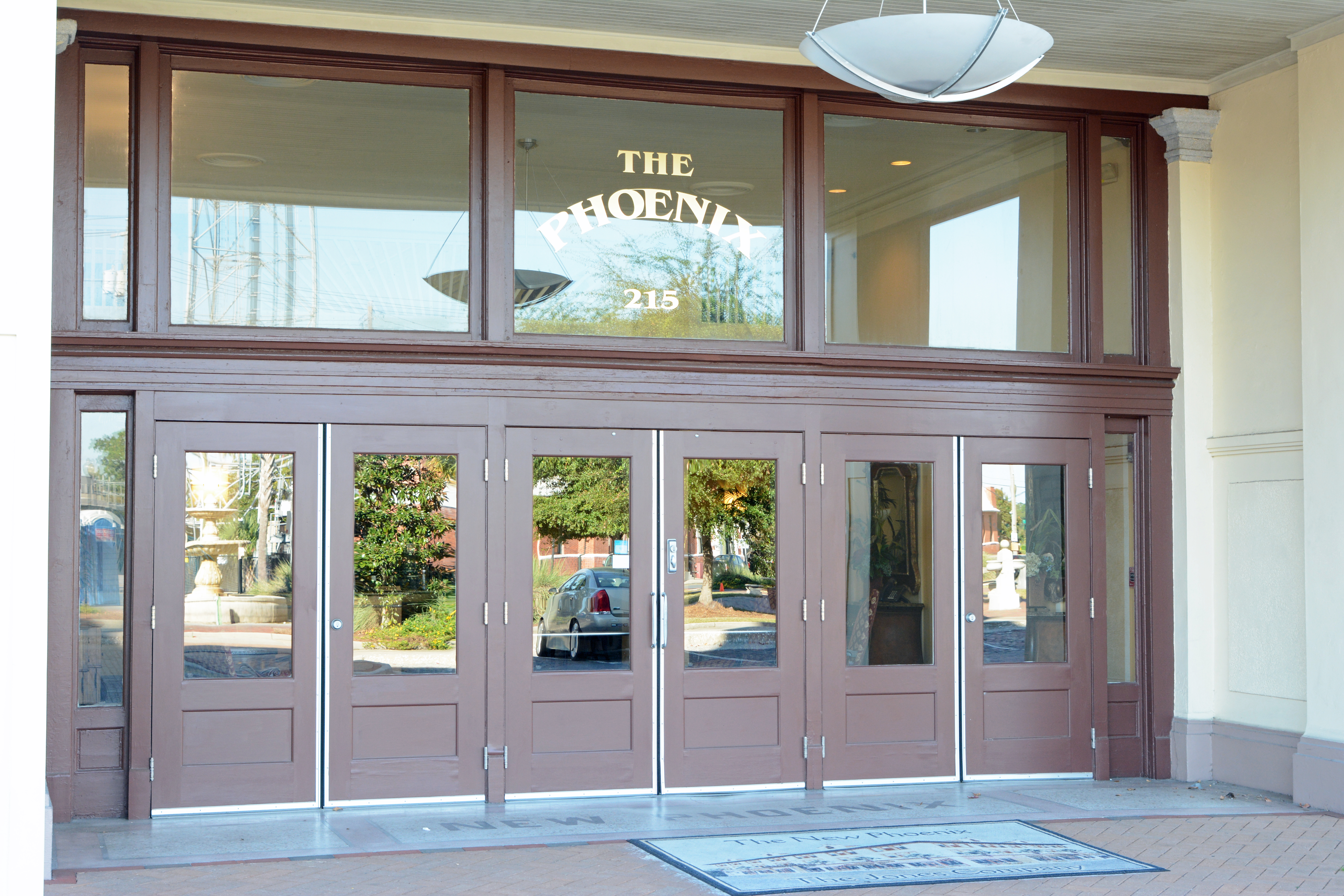
Entrance

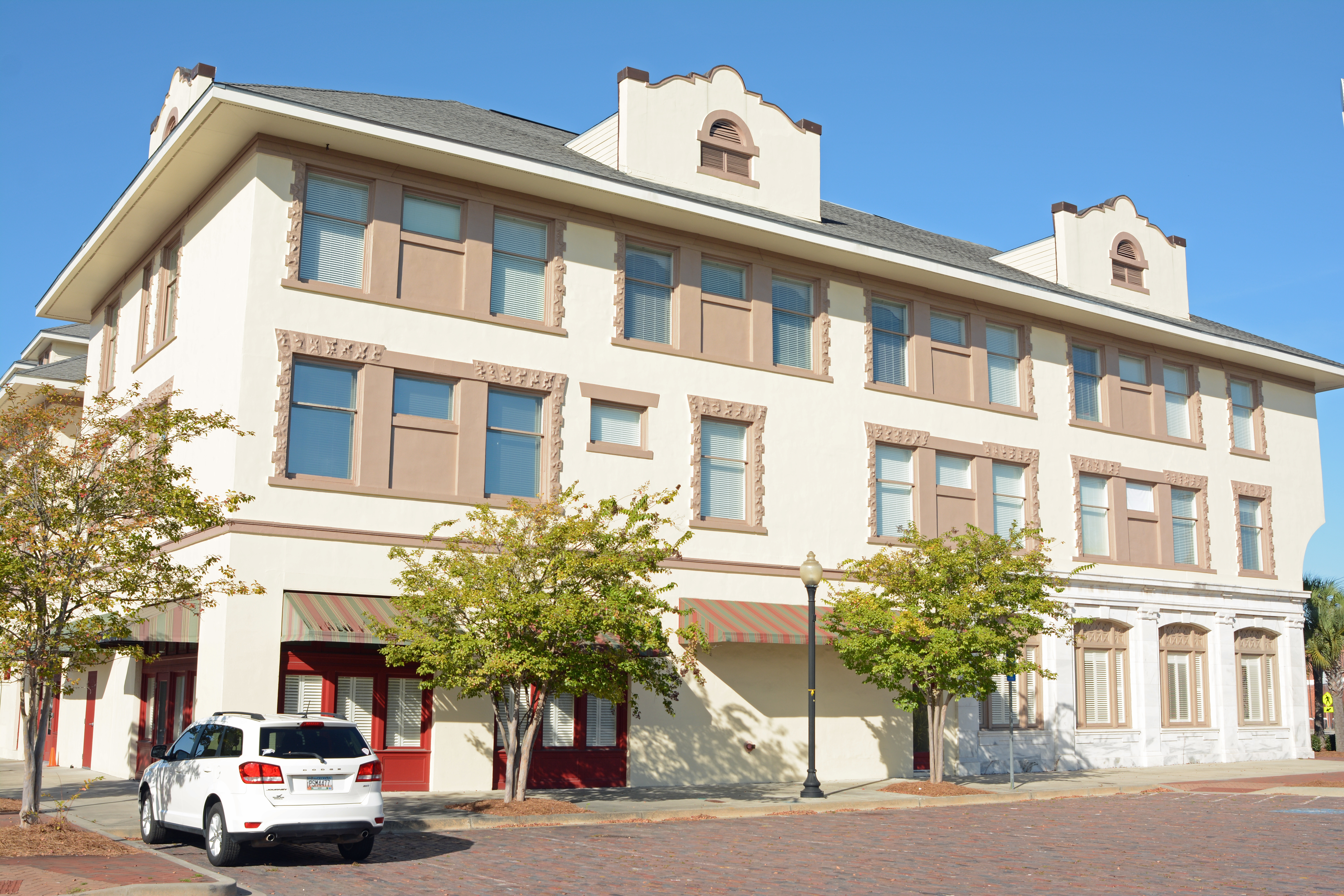
South side

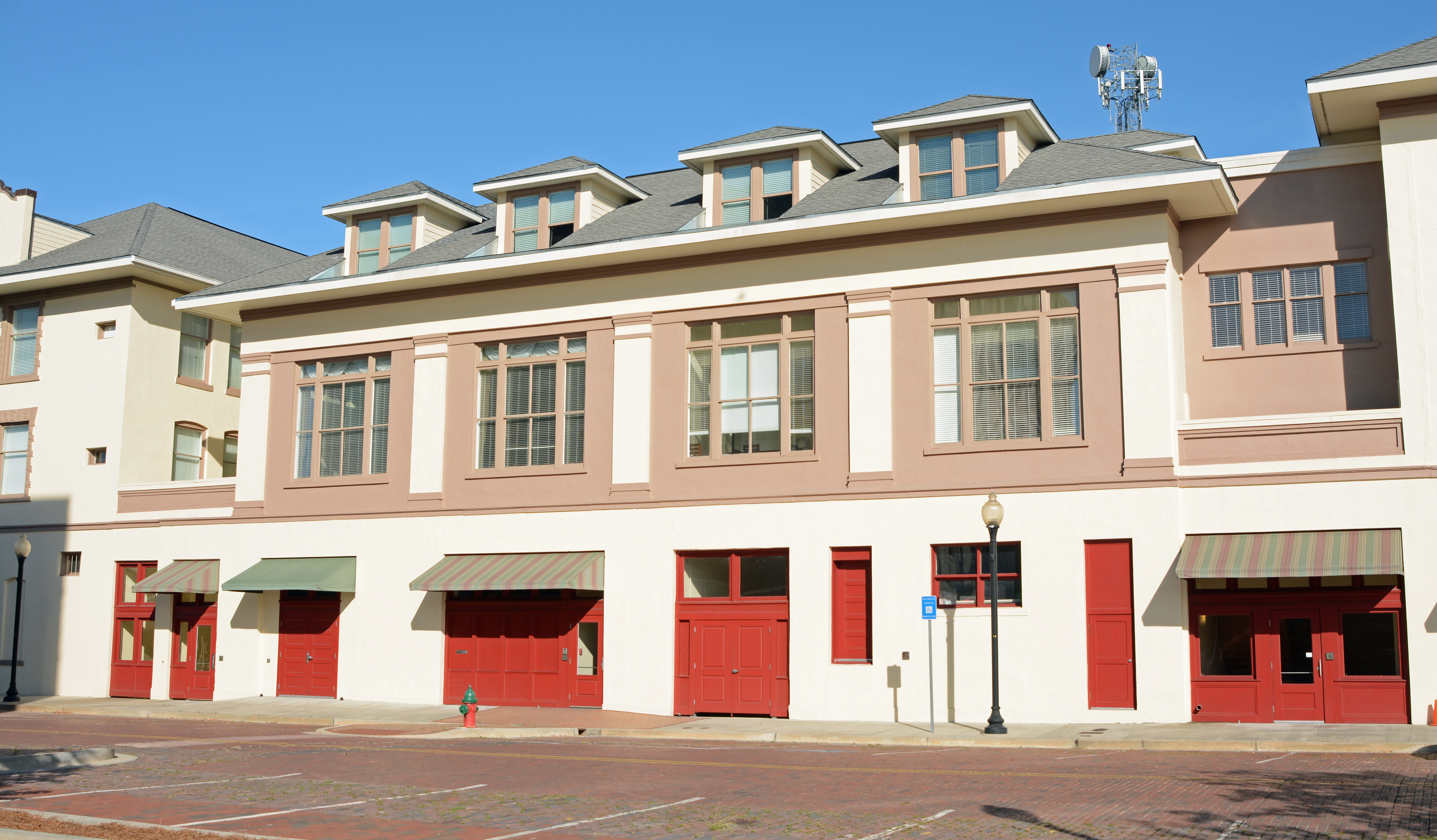
West side

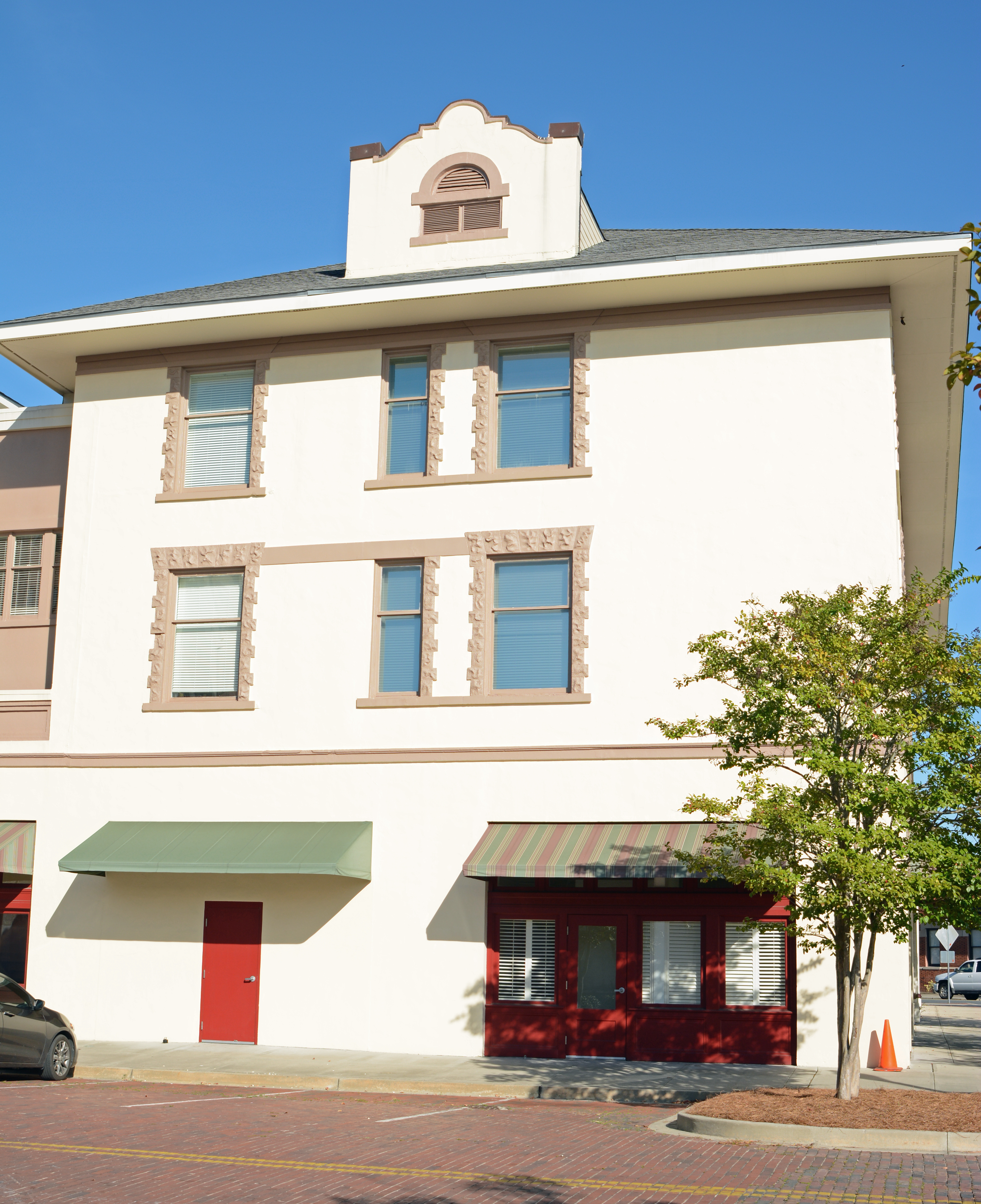
Detail

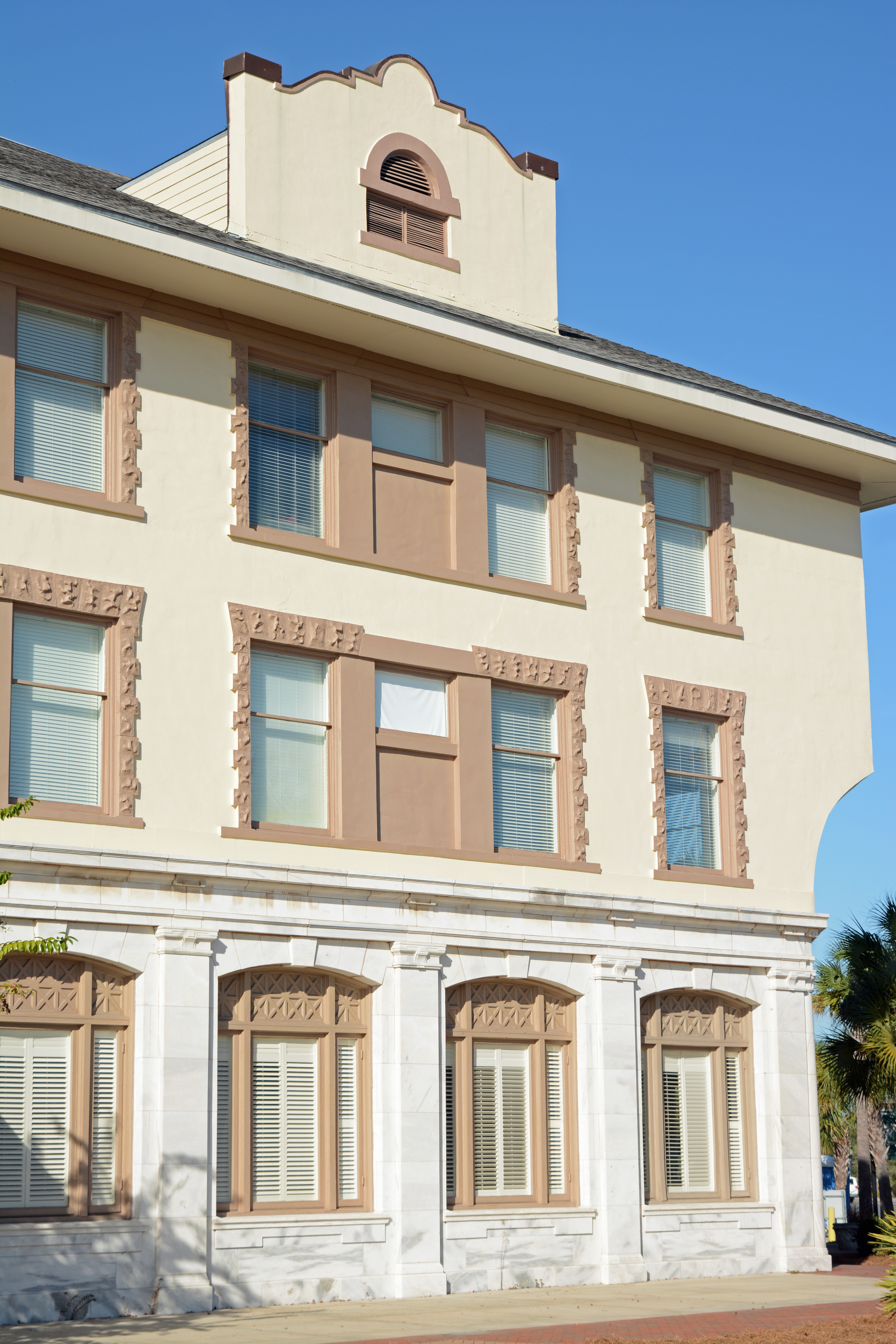
Detail

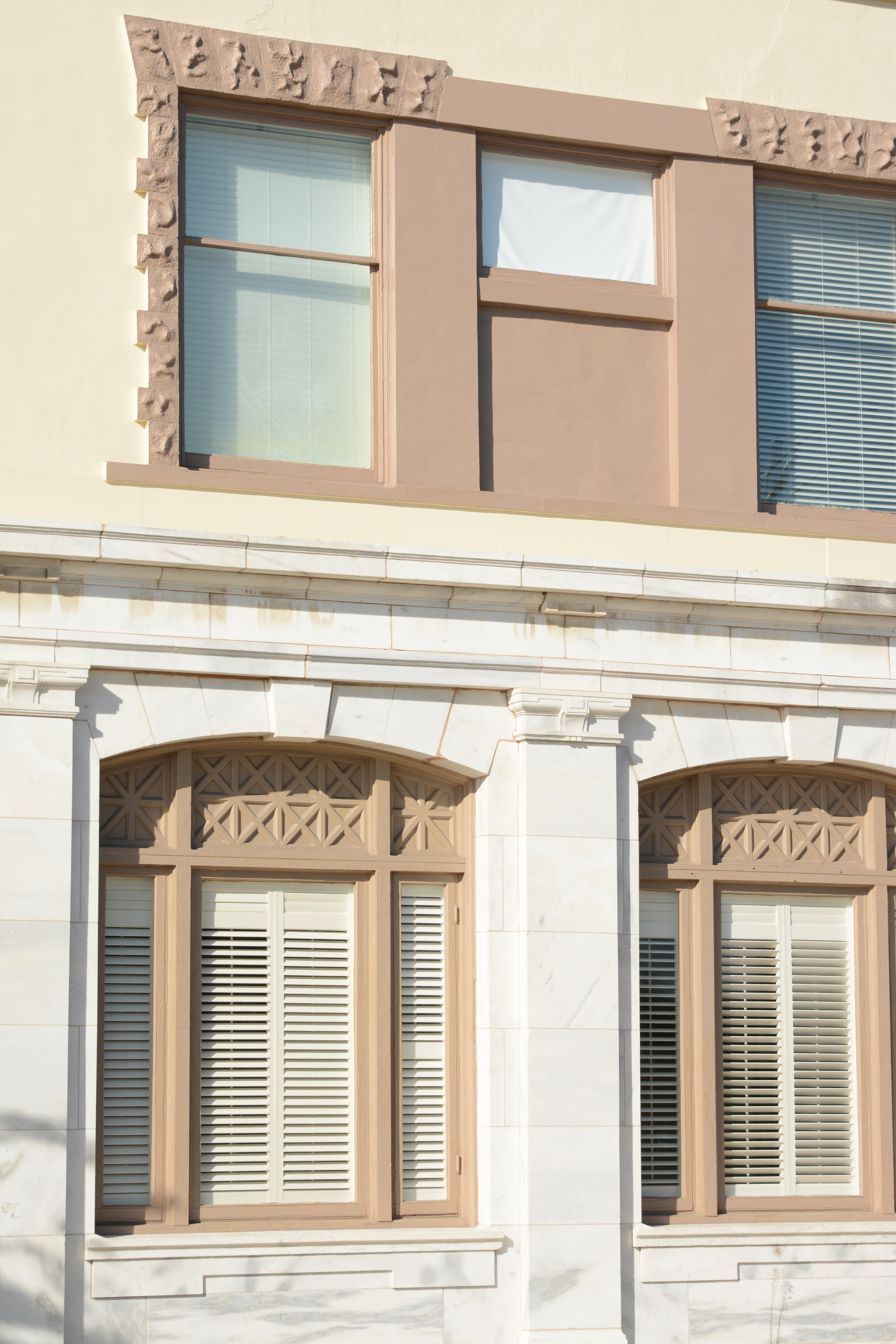
Window detail

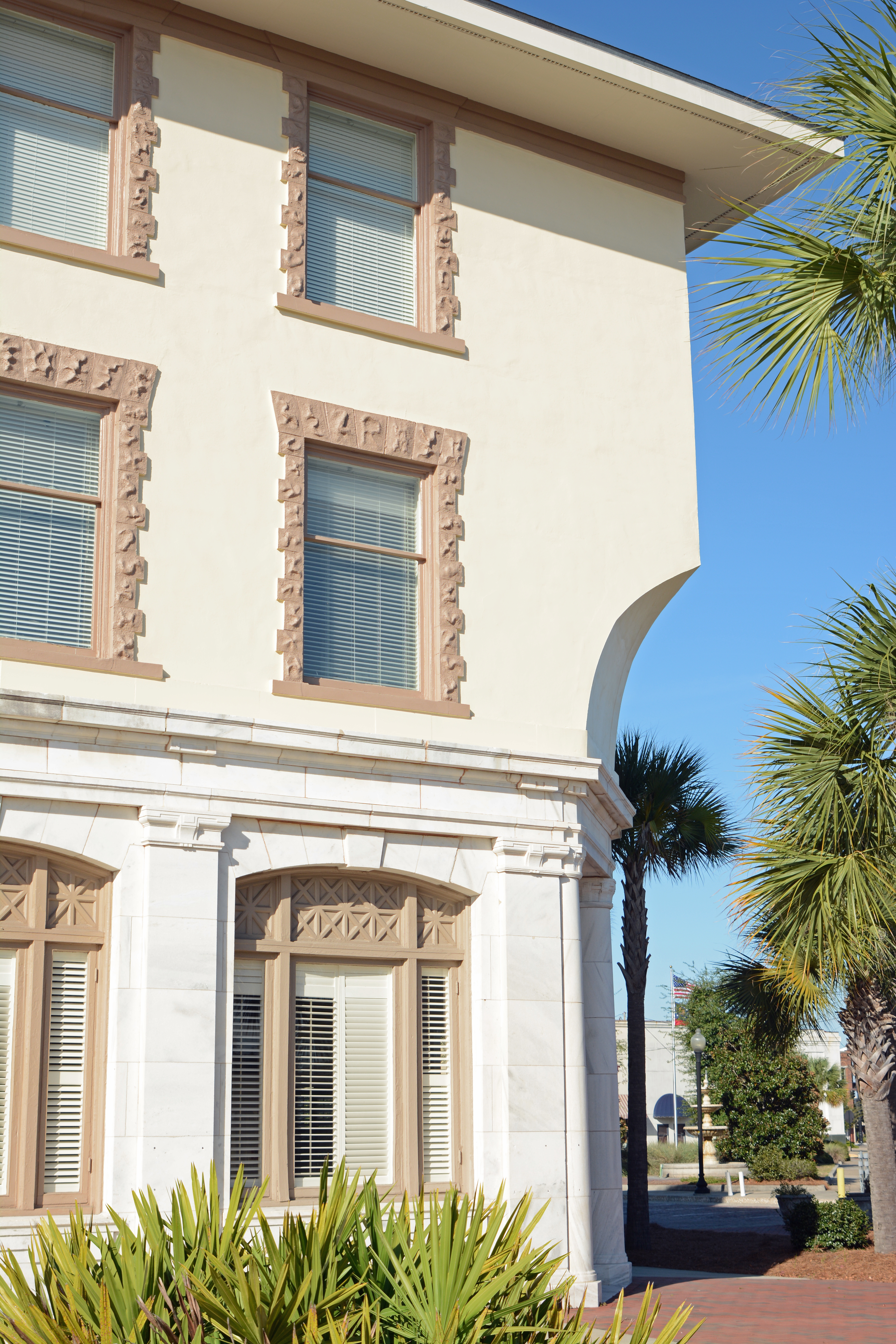
Corner detail

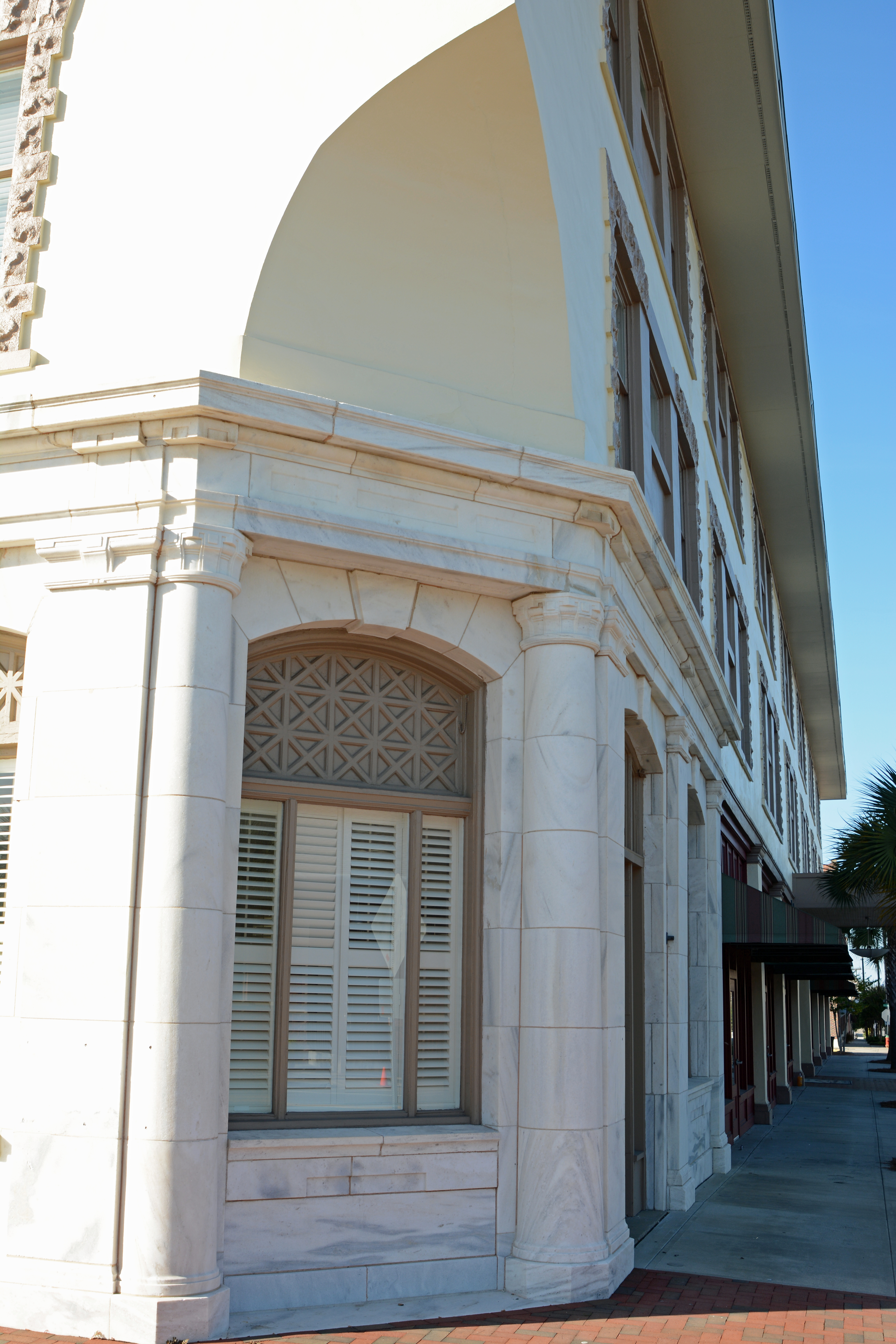
Corner detail
