= Hightower =

Hightower is a surname which may refer to:

== People ==
- Alma Julia Hightower (1888–1970), American vocalist
- Allison Hightower (born 1988), African-American professional basketball player
- Ben Hightower (1918–2003), American football player
- Bill Hightower (born 1959), American politician in Alabama
- Brandon Hightower (born 1998), American professional stock car racing driver
- Caroline Warner Hightower (born 1935), American development consultant
- Chelsie Hightower (born 1989), American ballroom dancer
- Cory Hightower (born 1979), African-American professional basketball player
- Cullen Hightower (1923–2008), American author of quips and quotes
- Dennis Hightower (born 1941), American army officer and former U.S. Deputy Secretary of Commerce
- Dick Hightower (1930–2007), American football player
- Donna Hightower (1926–2013), African-American singer-songwriter
- Dont'a Hightower (born 1990), American football player
- Ed Hightower, African-American basketball official
- Erik Hightower (born 1986), American Paralympic athlete
- Forrest Hightower (born 1992), African-American football defensive back
- George Robert Hightower (fl. early 20th century), American academic, president of the Mississippi Agricultural and Mechanical College
- Grace Hightower, American actress, singer, wife of actor Robert De Niro
- Jack Hightower (1926–2013), American politician
- James Robert Hightower (1915–2006), American professor of Chinese at Harvard University
- Jim Hightower (born 1943), American activist and commentator
- John Hightower (disambiguation), multiple people
- Keith Hightower (born 1957), American politician, mayor of Shreveport, Louisiana, from 1998 to 2006 – see List of mayors of Shreveport, Louisiana
- Kelsey Hightower (born 1981), African-American software engineer
- Laurel Hightower, American writer of horror
- Lee Hightower (born 1993), American football player
- Loren Hightower (1927–2017), American ballet and musical theater dancer
- Monteria Hightower, American librarian
- Richard Hightower (born 1980), African-American football coach
- Ron Hightower (born 1966), American film director and former pornographic actor
- Rosella Hightower (1920–2008), American ballerina
- Rosetta Hightower (1944–2014), American singer
- Scott Hightower (born 1952), American poet and teacher
- Stephanie Hightower (born 1958), African-American former hurdler
- Theresa Hightower (c. 1954–2018), American jazz singer
- Tim Hightower (born 1986), American football player
- Tommy Hightower, American retired football coach
- Verna Lee Hightower (1930–1970), African-American rodeo rider and civil rights activist.
- Wayne Hightower (1940–2002), African-American basketball player
- Yolanda Hightower (born 1961), American field hockey player

== Fictional characters ==
- Alicent Hightower, in the TV series House of the Dragon
- Bob Hightower, in the 1949 western film 3 Godfathers, played by John Wayne
- Reverend Gail Hightower, in the novel Light in August (1932) by William Faulkner
- Harrison Hightower III, in Tokyo DisneySea Version of The Twilight Zone Tower of Terror Disney ride
- Madeleine Hightower, in the TV series The Mentalist
- Moses Hightower (character), in the film and series Police Academy
- Reno Hightower, in The Best of Times (1986), played by Kurt Russell
- Steve Hightower, in the TV series The Steve Harvey Show, played by Steve Harvey
- Wes Hightower, in the film Urban Cowboy (1980), portrayed by Scott Glenn
- Sheriff Hightower, in the 1990 film Flashback

== See also ==
- Hightower Bald
- Senator Hightower (disambiguation)
