= Hightower (disambiguation) =

Hightower is a surname.

Hightower may also refer to:

- Hightower (band), a French punk rock band
- Hightower, Texas, United States, an unincorporated community
- Hightower Building, a commercial office building in Oklahoma City, Oklahoma, United States, on the National Register of Historic Places
- Hightower Falls, a waterfall and historic site in Cedartown, Georgia
- Hightower Forest, a state forest in Dawson County, Georgia, United States
- Hightower High School, Missouri City, Texas
- Hightower Park, a small park in Oklahoma City, Oklahoma
- Battle of Hightower, a 1793 battle of the Cherokee–American wars
- Hightower Text, a serif typeface

== See also ==
- High Tower, a 2014 Swedish children's radio programme
- "The High Tower", a first season episode of Star Wars Resistance
