= Dixon Memorial State Forest =

State forest in Georgia, United States

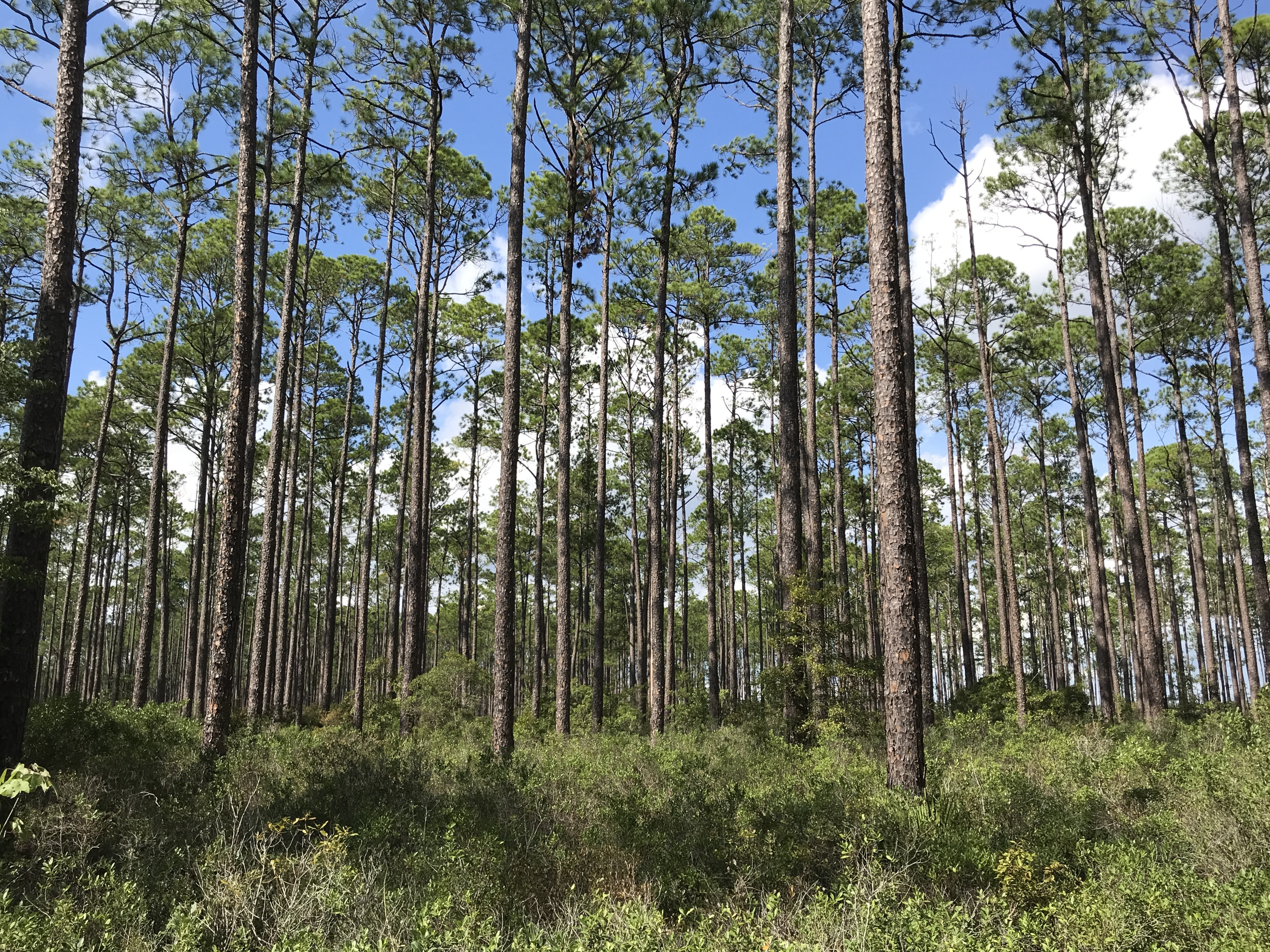
- 1935 Planted slash pine on Dixon Memorial State Forest

- Location within Georgia
- Interactive map of Dixon Memorial State Forest

Geography
- Location: Ware County, Georgia & Brantley County, Georgia, United States
- Coordinates: 31°7′13″N 82°15′17″W
- Area: 35,000 acres (14,000 ha)

Administration
- Established: 1938
- Authority: Georgia Forestry Commission

Ecology
- Dominant tree species: Slash pine (Pinus elliottii); Longleaf pine (Pinus palustris); Pondcypress (Taxodium ascendens) and various hardwoods

Dixon Memorial State Forest is a state forest in Brantley and Ware counties, located 10 miles southeast of Waycross, Georgia bordered by the Okefenokee National Wildlife Refuge to the south. The forest is approximately 35,000 acres and is the largest state forest owned and managed by the Georgia Forestry Commission. The forest is mostly made up of pine plantations consisting of slash pine, longleaf pine, and loblolly pine as well as wetlands consisting of pondcypress, swamp blackgum, sweetbay magnolia, loblolly bay, and other various hardwoods.

== History ==
In 1937, the U.S. Resettlement Administration purchased distressed farm and pasture land northeast of the Okefenokee Swamp under a federal Land Utilization Program authorized by the Bankhead-Jones Farm Tenant Act. The land purchase was for the Georgia Coastal Flatwoods Upland Game Conservation Project. The following year in 1938, the land was leased to the state of Georgia to manage and was renamed the Waycross State Forest. In 1955, a wildfire burned approximately half of the forest causing catastrophic damage. Later that year, the federal government deeded the forest to the State of Georgia. The Waycross State Forest was renamed in 1974 to Dixon Memorial State Forest in honor of longtime Georgia Forestry Commission board member, Hugh M. Dixon. The 2007 Sweat Farm Fire, which was part of the Georgia Bay Complex, catastrophically burned a significant portion of the southern and western parts of the forest. Then in 2011, the Racepond wildfire burned a path through a large amount of the southeastern state forest. Many of the areas on the state forest that burned in the 2007 and 2011 fires were reforested in longleaf pine.

== Current Forest Management ==
Currently, Dixon Memorial State Forest is managed for multiple uses with timber management as the primary objective. The pine plantation and wetland hardwood forests also provide benefits for wildlife habitats, soil conservation, water conservation, and aesthetics. The forest is also used for research and educational opportunities.

== Dixon Memorial State Forest Wildlife Management Area ==
Dixon Memorial State Forest is also a Wildlife Management Area that provides hunting opportunities for deer, turkey, dove, bear, and small game. The area is jointly managed between the Wildlife Resources Division of the Georgia Department of Natural Resources and the Georgia Forestry Commission. The Dixon Memorial Shooting Range is also located on Dixon Memorial State Forest.

== Leased Areas ==
A few entities lease portions of Dixon Memorial State Forest from the Georgia Forestry Commission. These include the Okefenokee Swamp Park, Laura S. Walker State Park, and the Georgia Lions Camp for the Blind.

== See also ==
- List of Georgia state forests
