= Laura S. Walker =

American author and conservationist

Laura Singleton Walker
- Born: Laura Singleton; February 28, 1861; Milledgeville, Georgia, US
- Died: April 9, 1955 (aged 94); Waycross, Georgia, US
- Other name: Laura S. Walker
- Occupations: Author and conservationist
- Years active: 1890–1955
- Known for: Laura S. Walker State Park
- Notable work: History of Ware County, Georgia
- Spouse: Dr. John Lott Walker

Laura Singleton Walker (February 28, 1861 – April 9, 1955) was an American author and conservationist. Laura S. Walker State Park, in Waycross, Georgia, is named in her honor.

== Biography ==
=== Early years ===
Laura Singleton was born February 28, 1861, in Milledgeville, Georgia, where she spent her early years. When she married Dr. John Lott Walker, the couple moved to Waycross, Georgia, where they resided for the rest of their lives. It was during this period that Laura became distinguished for her literary and civic works.

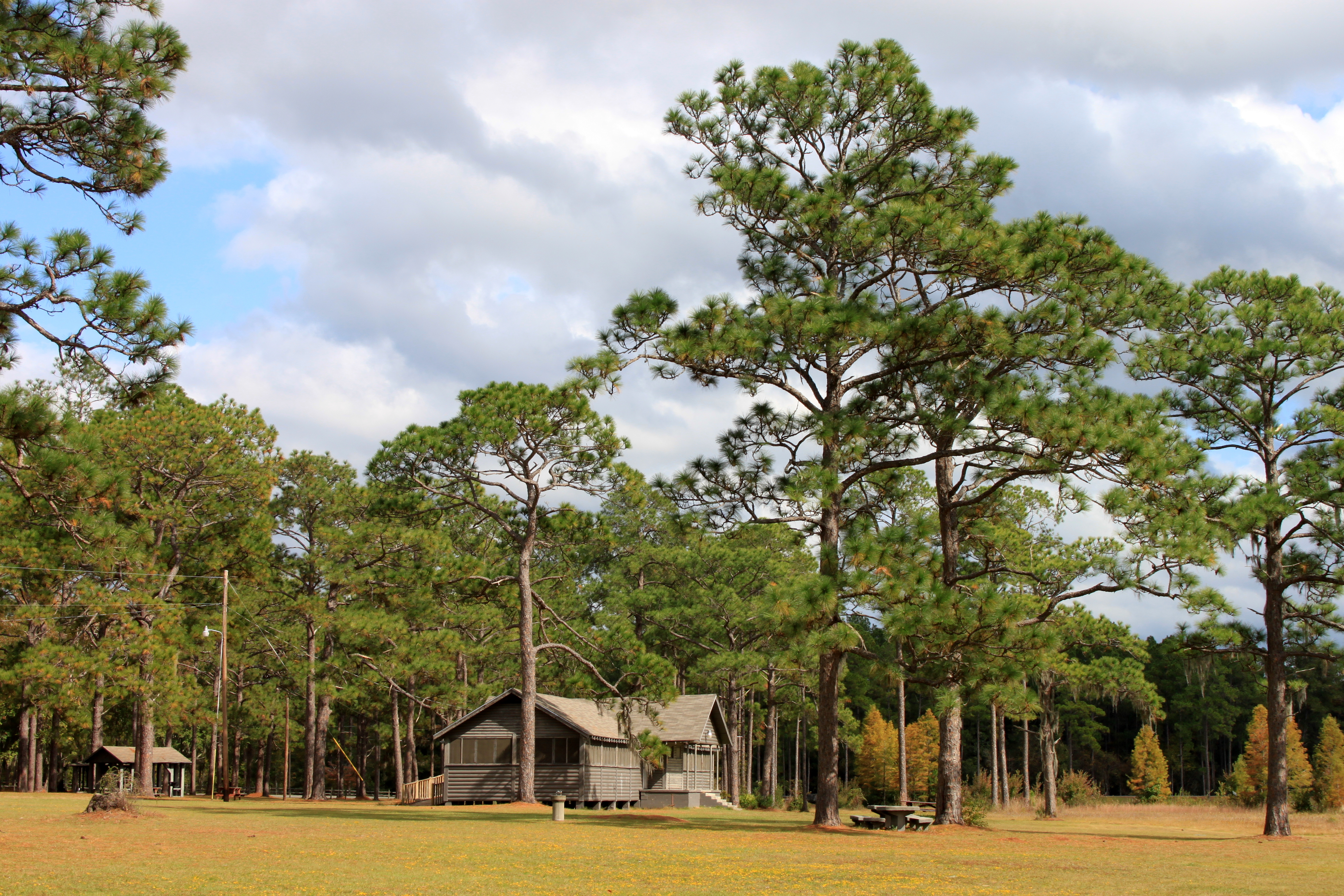
Laura S. Walker State Park

=== Work as a conservationist ===
As a teacher, writer, and public speaker, Walker championed the cause of conservation. She outlined a comprehensive program of forestry activity, including the establishment of forest parks, and sought to enhance school forestry programs. She also undertook roadside beautification projects, and fought for forestry legislation. Walker erected markers and monuments along old trails and at historic sites so that local history would not be forgotten. Through these efforts, she developed friendships with many influential community leaders, presidents, governors and military leaders. Over time, an effort was made to recognize Laura Walker for her work. At the urging of Georgia's Senators, President Franklin D Roosevelt issued a proclamation to establish the Laura S. Walker National Park in her honor. She was the only living person for whom a state or national park was named. In 1937, the federal government purchased distressed farmland for the park under a Federal land utilization program authorized by the Bankhead-Jones Farm Tenant Act. Work on the park was undertaken by the Works Progress Administration and the Civilian Conservation Corps. In 1941, the national park was deeded over to Georgia, becoming the state's 13th state park.

=== Published works ===
Walker wrote three books about the land and history of her home. They are: History of Ware County, Georgia. First published in 1934, it relates Ware County history from Indian Wars; notable families; to the routing of US 1 through Waycross up until 1934. About "Old Okefenåok" and Doctors of Primitive Times and Horse and Buggy Days of Ware County.

=== Death ===
Laura S. Walker died on April 9, 1955, in Waycross, Georgia, at the age of 94. She was interred in her husband's family cemetery, Lott Cemetery.
