= Dottie Dodgion =

American drummer (1929–2021)

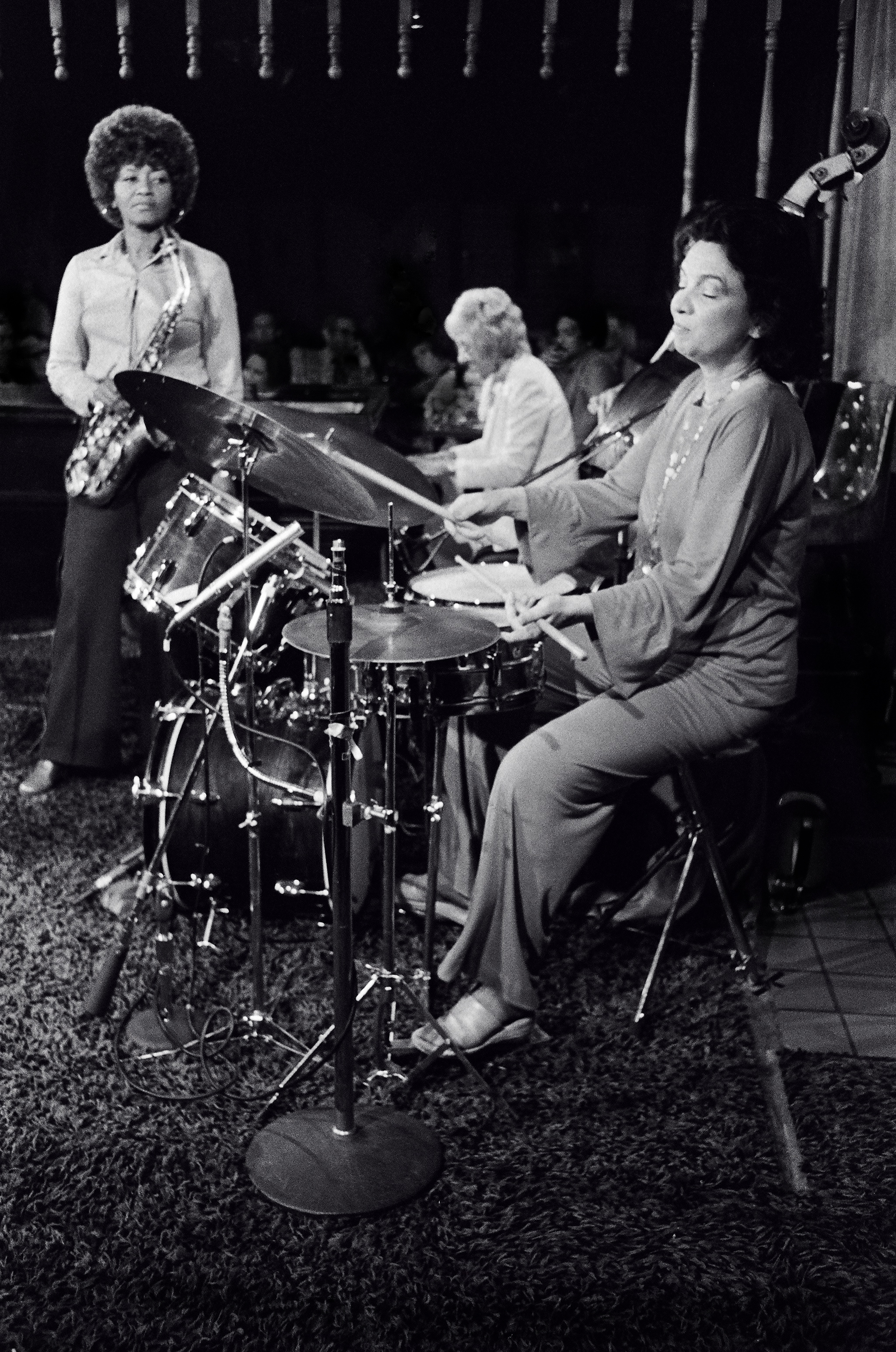
- Vi Redd, Marian McPartland and Dottie Dodgion in 1977

Background information
- Born: Dorothy Rosalie Giaimo; September 23, 1929; Brea, California
- Died: September 17, 2021 (aged 91)
- Genre: Jazz
- Occupation: Singer-songwriter
- Instruments: Vocals, Drummer
- Years active: 1940s–1980s

Dottie Dodgion (born Dorothy Rosalie Giaimo; September 23, 1929 – September 17, 2021) was an American jazz drummer and singer.

== Life and career ==
Dodgion was born on September 23, 1929, in Brea, California. As a child, Giaimo sang in the band led by her father, a drummer. She grew up in the Bay Area and sang with jazz guitarist Nick Esposito and bassist Charles Mingus as a teenager. An early marriage to Robert Bennett was annulled. After marrying Monty Budwig in 1952, she began playing drums, but Budwig tried to dissuade her from the instrument; she received encouragement to play from Jerry Dodgion and bassist Eugene Wright, and subsequently divorced Budwig in 1954 to marry Dodgion. Her new husband advised her to choose between singing and drums; she decided to concentrate on the latter.

She worked with Carl Fontana in Las Vegas toward the end of the decade and then relocated in 1961 to New York City. There she played in Benny Goodman's ensemble for ten days (her husband was also working with Goodman), but was fired for gaining more applause than her boss, Dodgion wrote in her autobiography. She was soon hired by Tony Bennett who was performing at the Waldorf-Astoria Hotel. Over the course of the decade, she worked with Marian McPartland and Eddie Gomez, Billy Mitchell and Al Grey, Wild Bill Davison, and Al Cohn and Zoot Sims. In the early 1970s, she worked with Ruby Braff and Joe Venuti, then played alongside her husband in Germany with Walter Norris and George Mraz. Dottie and Jerry Dodgion separated in 1975, and divorced a few years later.

In 1977, Marian McPartland formed an all-female group with Dodgion, Vi Redd, Mary Osborne and Lynn Milano. Dottie moved to Washington, D.C. for a time, where she was musical director of the club The Rogue and Jar, but the venue closed in January 1979. After moving back to New York City, she worked in the 1980s with Melba Liston, George Wein, Michael Brecker and Randy Brecker, Frank Wess, Jimmie Rowles, Carol Sloane, Pepper Adams, Tommy Flanagan, Roland Hanna, Sal Nistico, Herb Ellis, Chris White, Bob Cranshaw, Joe Newman, and Harold Danko. After returning to the Bay Area in 1984, she played regularly at the Monterey Jazz Festival.

Dodgion died on September 17, 2021, in a hospice in Pacific Grove, California, after suffering a stroke. A daughter from her marriage to Budwig was her only survivor. An autobiography, The Lady Swings: Memoirs of a Jazz Drummer, co-written by Dodgion and Wayne Enstice, was published by the University of Illinois Press in March 2021.

== Discography ==
=== As leader ===
- Dottie Dodgion Sings (Arbors Jazz, 1993)

=== As accompanist ===
With Ruby Braff

- The Music Of Ruby Braff And His International Jazz Quartet (Chiaroscuro, 1972)

With Marian McPartland

- Now's The Time (Halcyon, 1977)
