= List of Georgia state forests =

This is a list of Georgia state forests. In the state of Georgia, all state forests are managed by the Georgia Forestry Commission. All state forests are operated under a multiple-use Forest Stewardship management plan. This takes into account the wood product, wildlife, recreational, soil, aesthetic, historical, and cultural resources of the forest. Some of the state forests are also available for public recreational activities.

== List of state forests ==
The following table contains information on all seven state forests in Georgia.

Forest Name	County or Counties	Size	Notes
Bartram Forest	Baldwin County and Wilkinson County	2,113 acres (855 ha)	
Broxton Rocks Forest	Coffee County	350 acres (140 ha)	
Dawson Forest	Dawson County	10,130 acres (4,100 ha)	City of Atlanta Tract
Dixon Memorial State Forest	Ware County and Brantley County	35,000 acres (14,000 ha)	
Hightower Forest	Dawson County	142 acres (57 ha)	
Paulding Forest	Paulding County	10,000 acres (4,000 ha)	City of Atlanta Tract
Spirit Creek Forest	Richmond County	725 acres (293 ha)	

== See also ==
- List of national forests of the United States
- List of Georgia state parks
