= Vi Redd =

American jazz musician, vocalist and educator (1928–2022)

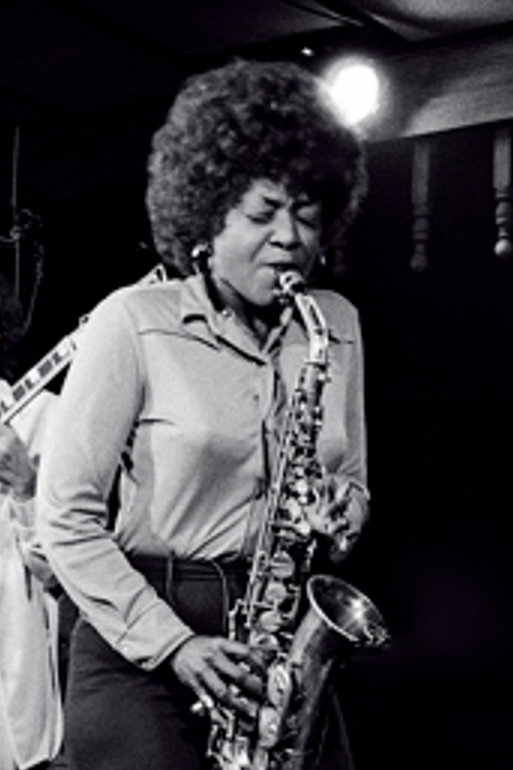
- Redd performing in Rochester, New York, 1977

Background information
- Born: Elvira Redd; September 20, 1928; Los Angeles, California, U.S.
- Died: February 6, 2022 (aged 93)
- Genres: Jazz; bebop; hard bop
- Occupations: Musician, vocalist, teacher
- Instruments: Alto saxophone, vocals
- Years active: 1950–2010
- Labels: Atlantic; Atco; United Artists
- Formerly of: Count Basie orchestra

Elvira Louise Redd (September 20, 1928 – February 6, 2022) was an American jazz alto saxophone player, vocalist and educator. She was active from the early 1950s and was known primarily for playing in the blues style. She was highly regarded as an accomplished veteran, and performed with Count Basie, Rahsaan Roland Kirk, Linda Hopkins, Marian McPartland and Dizzy Gillespie.

== Life and career ==
Redd was born on September 20, 1928, in Los Angeles, California, the daughter of New Orleans jazz drummer and Clef Club co-founder Alton Redd and Mattie Redd (née Thomas). Her mother played saxophone, although not professionally, and her brother was a percussionist. She was deeply influenced during her formative years by her father, who was one of the leading figures on the Central Avenue jazz scene. Another important musical mentor was her paternal great aunt Alma Hightower, who convinced the 10-year-old Redd to switch from piano to saxophone. During junior high school, Redd played alto saxophone in a band with Melba Liston and Dexter Gordon.

Redd graduated from Los Angeles State College in 1954, and earned a teaching certificate from University of Southern California. After working for the Board of Education from 1957 to 1960, Redd returned to jazz. She played in Las Vegas in 1962, toured with Earl Hines in 1964 and led a group in San Francisco in the mid-1960s with her husband, drummer Richie Goldberg. During this time, Redd also worked with Max Roach. While active, she toured as far as Japan, London (including an unprecedented 10 weeks at Ronnie Scott's), Sweden, Spain and Paris. In 1969, she settled in Los Angeles where she played locally while also working as an educator.

She recorded two albums under her own name. Bird Call, released on United Artists in 1962, featured Russ Freeman, Roy Ayers, Herb Ellis, Bob Whitlock and Richie Goldberg on its first half of tracks; the other half was recorded with trumpeter Kansas Lawrence instead of Ellis, and Leroy Vinnegar on bass.

On her second 1963 album Lady Soul (Atco), there were also two sessions with different line-ups. For the most part, pianist Dick Hyman, Paul Griffin on organ, Bucky Pizzarelli on guitar, bassist Ben Tucker and drummer Dave Bailey played; the remaining three tracks were recorded with Bill Perkins on tenor saxophone and flute, organist Jennell Hawkins, guitarist Barney Kessel, Vinnegar on bass, and Leroy Harrison on drums. For both albums Leonard Feather supervised the recordings and wrote the liner notes.

In the late 1970s, she recorded another album called Now's the Time with an all-female group of musicians led by Marian McPartland featuring guitarist Mary Osborne, Lynn Milano on bass, and Dottie Dodgion on drums, released on Partland's label Halcyon in 1977.

Redd taught and lectured for many years from the 1970s onward upon returning to Los Angeles. She served on the music advisory panel of the National Endowment for the Arts in the late 1970s. In 1989, she received the Lifetime Achievement Award from the Los Angeles Jazz Society. In 2001, she received the Mary Lou Williams Women in Jazz Award from the Kennedy Center.

Redd died on February 6, 2022, at the age of 93.

== Discography ==
- Bird Call (United Artists, 1962)
- Lady Soul (Atco, 1963)
- Now's the Time with Marian McPartland, Mary Osborne, Lynn Milano, and Dottie Dodgion (Halcyon, 1977)
