= Spirit Creek Forest =

State forest in Georgia, United States

Coordinates: 33°20′45″N 82°1′51″W

- Interactive map of Spirit Creek Forest

Geography
- Location: Richmond County, Georgia, United States
- Area: 725 acres (293 ha)

Administration
- Authority: Georgia Forestry Commission

Ecology
- Dominant tree species: Loblolly pines (Pinus taeda); Longleaf pine (Pinus palustris) and various hardwoods

Spirit Creek Forest is a state forest in Richmond County, Georgia. The forest is 725 acres and is managed by the Georgia Forestry Commission. The forest is mostly made up of wetlands, loblolly pines, and bottomland hardwoods.

== History ==
The land where Spirit Creek Forest is currently located used to belong to the Gracewood State School and Hospital. They grew their crops and raised cattle and chickens. The field where then abandoned for a period of time before being leased to local farmers. These farmers converted the land to bahia grass fields to raise cattle.

In 1984, the fields were given to the Georgia Forestry Commission. In the winter of 1984–1985, loblolly pines were planted on approximately 480 acres.

== Present day ==
Currently, Spirit Creek Forest contains loblolly pines along with other types of timber, including longleaf pines and mixed strands of hardwood. Benefits provided by the forest include timber production, wildlife habitats, soil conservation, water conservation, aesthetics, and educational opportunities. The forest is located in the southern part of Richmond County and is 30 minutes away from Augusta, Georgia.

== Spirit Creek Forest Wildlife Management Area ==
The Spirit Creek Forest Wildlife Management Area is a 570 acre property adjacent to Spirit Creek Forest that provides hunting opportunities for deer, turkey and small game hunting. The area is jointly managed between the Wildlife Resources Division of the Georgia Department of Natural Resources and the Georgia Forestry Commission. The main hunting opportunities at the Spirit Creek Forest WMA include archery deer, archery turkey, squirrel, and rabbit, along with some dove and waterfowl. Only shotguns and archery equipment may be used for small game hunting. Other activities available within the Wildlife Management Area include biking, geocaching, and wildlife viewing. Several bike trails also run through the area.

== See also ==
- List of Georgia state forests
