= Land Utilization Program =

New Deal land agency

- A 1942 United States Department of Agriculture map tracking active regional Land Utilization Program project boundaries.

Agency overview
- Formed: 1934
- Dissolved: 1964
- Jurisdiction: United States Federal
- Headquarters: Washington, D.C.
- Parent agency: Agricultural Adjustment Administration (1934–1935); Resettlement Administration (1935–1937); Soil Conservation Service (1938–1954); U.S. Forest Service (1954–1964)

Land Utilization Program project map from 1936

Land Utilization Program land map from 1942

Land Utilization Program (LUP) was a U.S. federal government agency that operated from 1934-1964. It was one of many Alphabet agencies, also called New Deal agencies. Land Utilization Program was created to combat the Dust Bowl and the Great Depression in the United States.

== History ==
The National Industrial Recovery Act of 1933 included funds to fight soil erosion. Causes of the dust bowl included concentrated agriculture practiced by so-called sodbusters (farmers who replaced fields of native grasses with wheat and other crops). Some of the grassland was previously used for livestock. Most sodbuster activity came between 1905 and 1915. By the 1920s rainfall had decreased and crops failed. The soil turned to dust and formed the black blizzards of the Great Plains for about 10 years. In 1929, the Agricultural Marketing Act of 1929 directed the Federal Farm Board to study the problem. In 1931, President Herbert Hoover's United States Secretary of Agriculture, Arthur M. Hyde, formed a National Conference on Land Utilization in 1931 to study Dust Bowl problems and to make recommendations. In 1933, Hoover asked Congress to act on the recommendations. A National Planning Board was founded in the Public Works Administration on in July 1933. This Board became the National Resources Board by an executive orders of President Franklin D. Roosevelt on June 30, 1934.

In 1933, a Special Board of Public Works composed of members from Federal departments recommended a program for purchasing farmland with damaged soil. In February 1934, the Agricultural Adjustment Administration launched the program. In 1934, the recommendation for the government to purchase and develop 75 million acres of such land was adopted. Starting in 1934, the government acquired 11 million acres of Great Plains land from private owners for $47.5 million. The land was turned into federally managed grazing land. The Land Utilization Program managed these lands. LUP seeded and managed the grassland for 10 years. Lands were used for pasture, forest, livestock, parks, recreation, and wildlife refuges. In total some 250 land utilization projects were created in 45 states. Parcels were purchased under the Bankhead–Jones Farm Tenant Act of 1937, National Industrial Recovery Act of 1933, and the Emergency Relief Appropriation Act of 1935. The Resettlement Administration was established by Executive Order, in 1935. LUP was transferred to the Resettlement Administration, with an initial allotment of $48 million for land purchase and $18 million to employ labor for development. In 1937, LUP was under the Bureau of Agricultural Economics. In 1938, LUP joined the Soil Conservation Service. In 1954 LUP moved under United States Forest Service where it remained until the program ended in 1964.

== Gallery ==
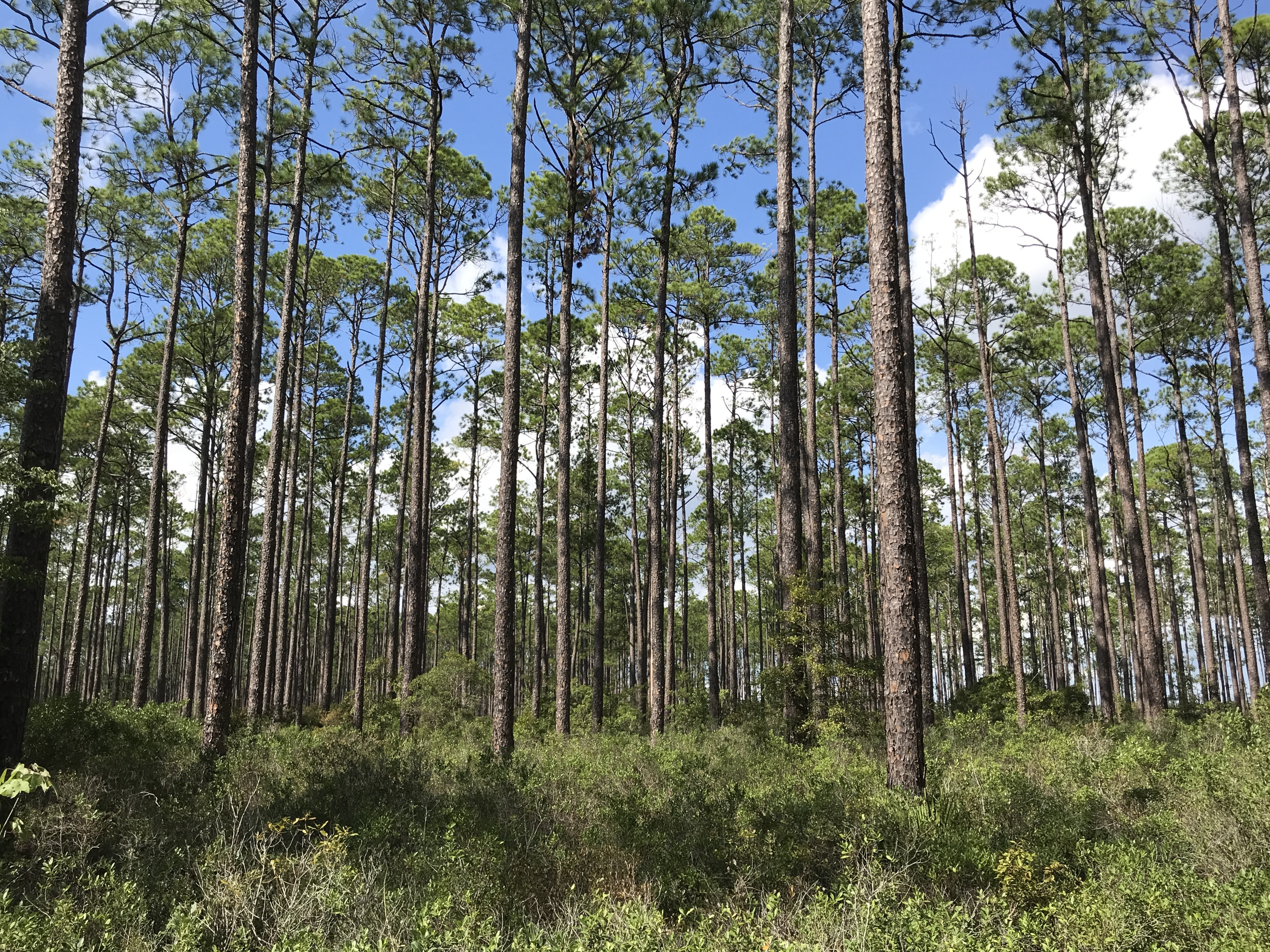
Slash Pines in Dixon Memorial State Forest planted in 1935, under the Land Utilization Program

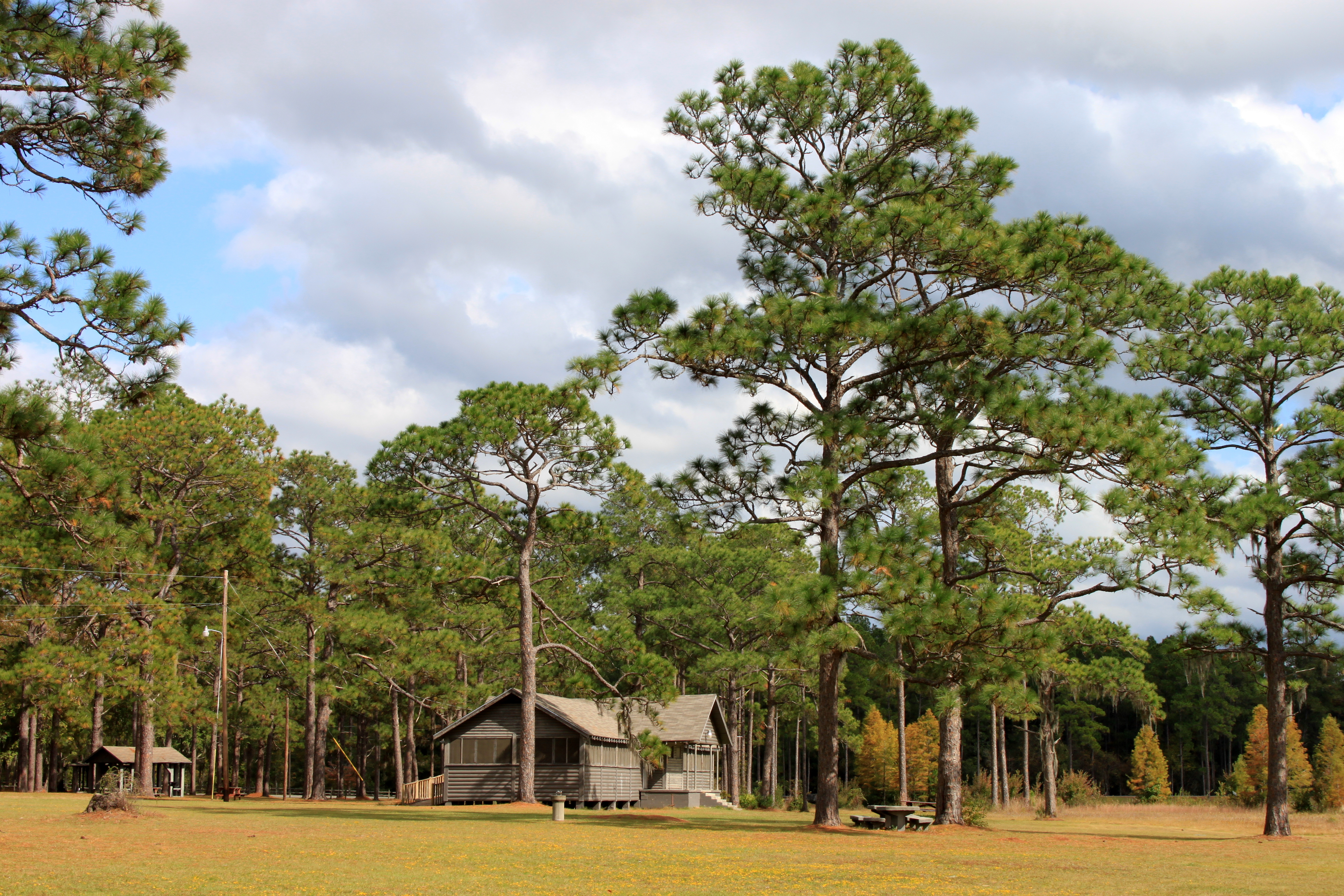
Trees in the Laura S. Walker State Park planted in 1937, under the Land Utilization Program

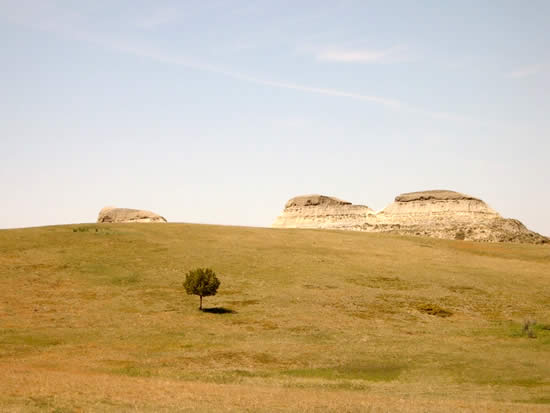
Little Missouri National Grassland form from failed farms and ranches under the Land Utilization Program

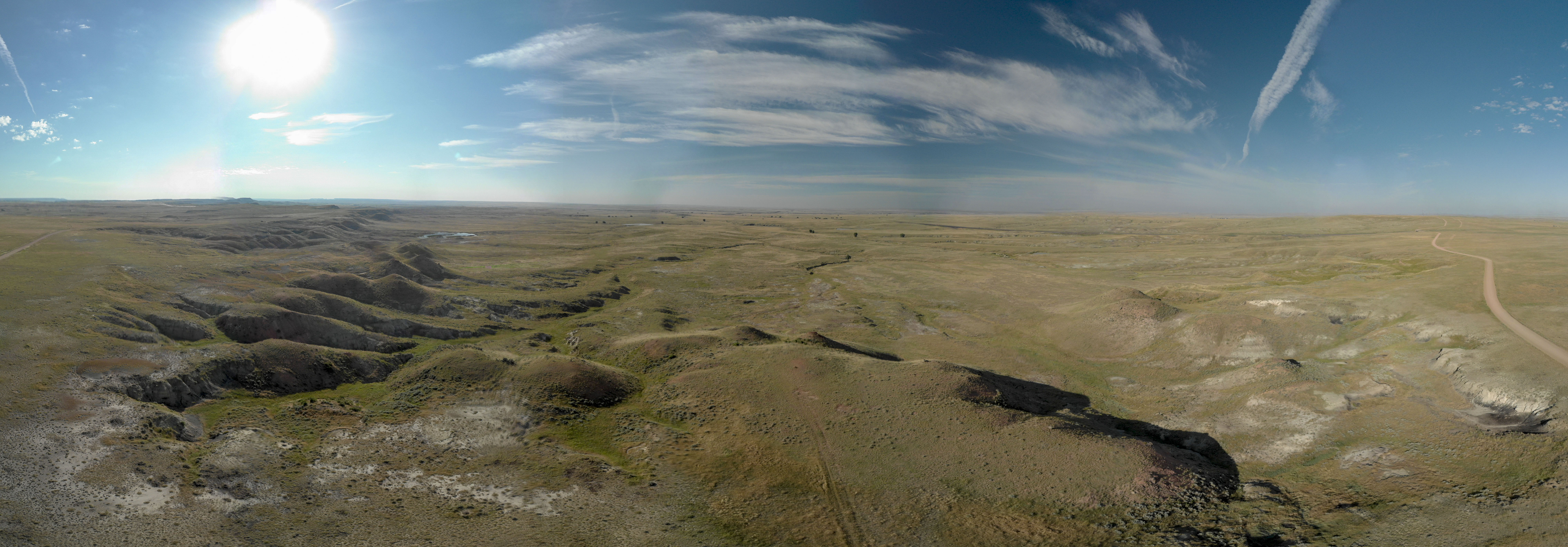
Thunder Basin National Grassland form from failed farms and ranches under the Land Utilization Program

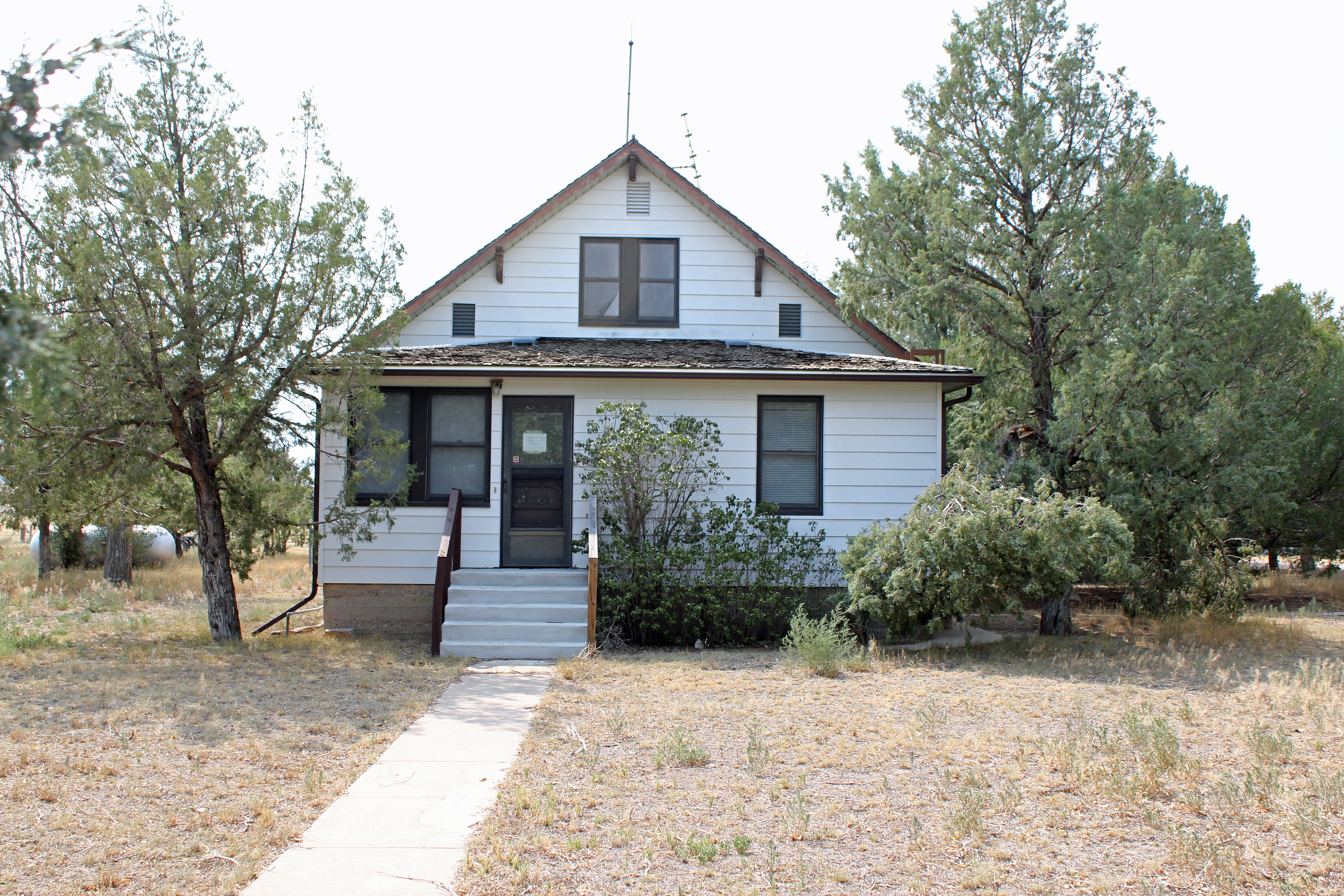
A Colorado Land Utilization Program Headquarters in Briggsdale, Colorado. Now a National Register of Historic Places listings in Weld County, Colorado

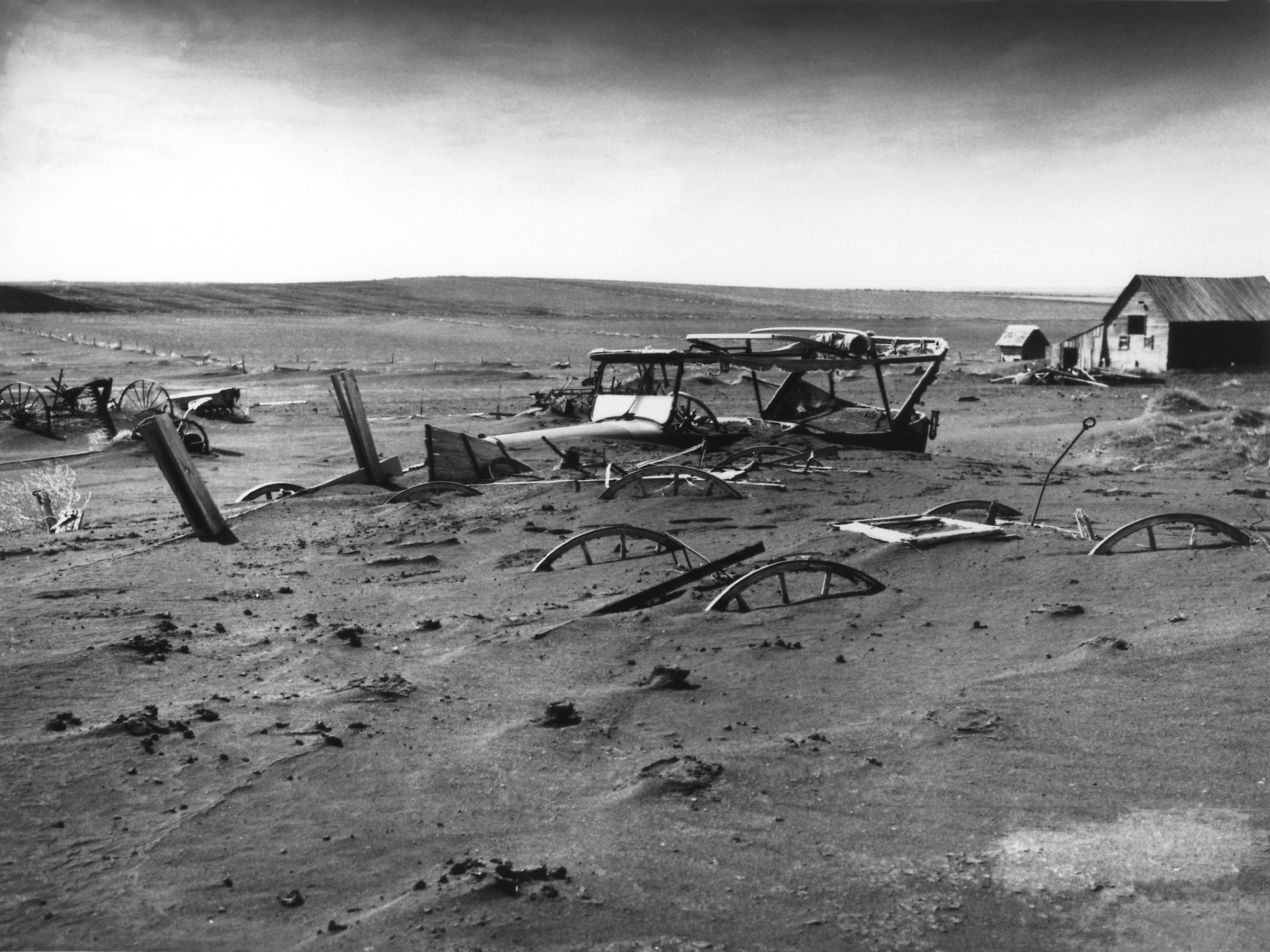
Dust Bowl in Dallas, South Dakota in 1936 with buried farm machinery

== See also ==
- Drought Relief Service
- Dixon Memorial State Forest
- Laura S. Walker State Park
- Soil Erosion Service
