= Lott Cemetery =

Historical cemetery in Ware County, Georgia, US

- U.S. National Register of Historic Places
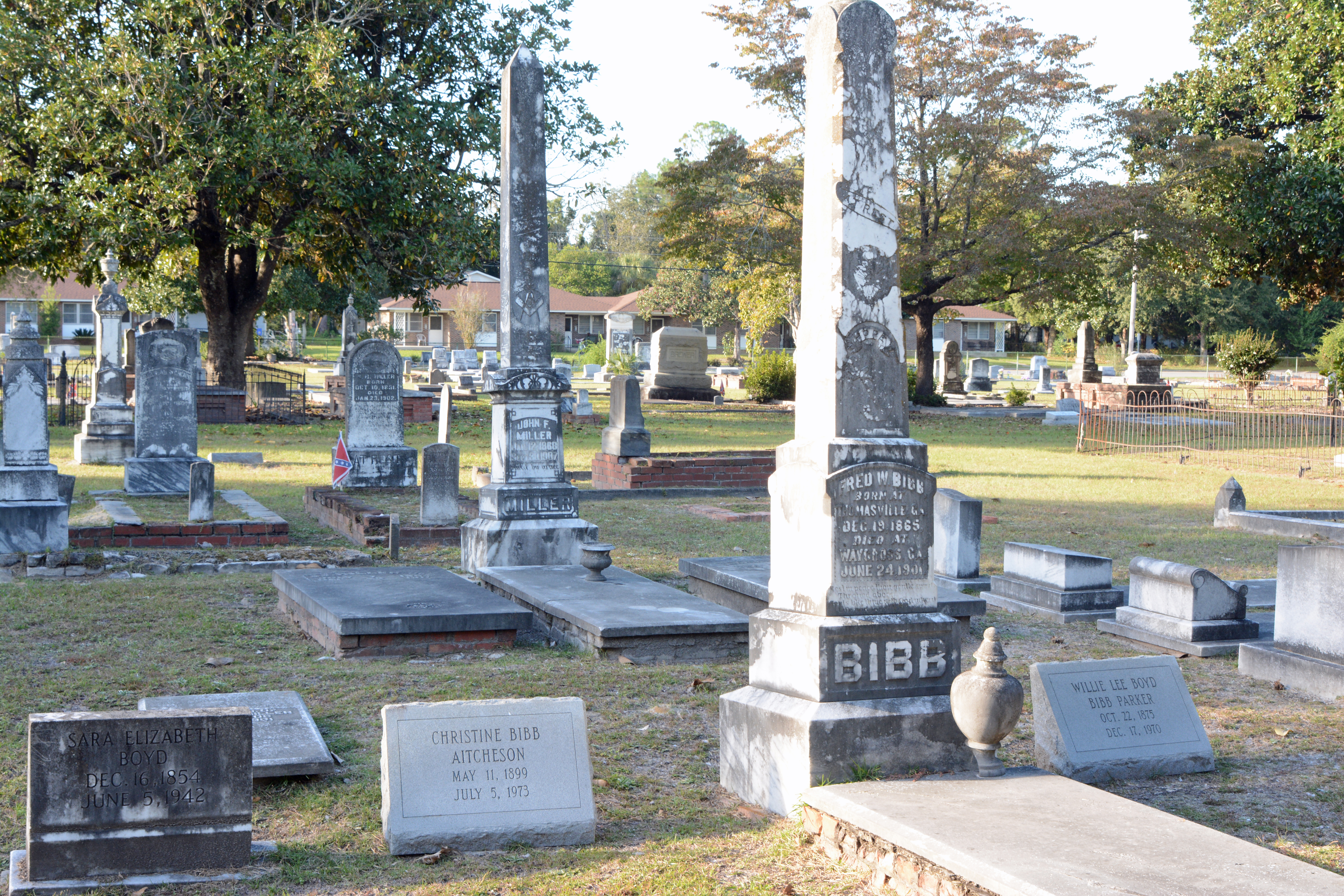

- Location within Georgia Location within the United States
- Location: Butler St. between Tebeau and Pendleton St., Waycross, Georgia
- Coordinates: 31°13′20″N 82°21′17″W
- Area: 5.3 acres (2.1 ha)
- Built: 1877
- NRHP reference No.: 08000712
- Added to NRHP: July 24, 2008

Lott Cemetery is a cemetery in Waycross, Georgia, which was established in 1877. It occupies the block bounded by Butler, Tebeau, Quarterman, and Pendleton streets. There were no areas designated for religious or ethnic groups. African-American graves are along the western edge. Several veterans of the Confederate States Army are also buried there. It was the main cemetery in the city until the Oakland Cemetery was created in 1901 and the African-American Pine Hill Cemetery in 1907. There is a wide variety of funerary art in the cemetery.

It was added to the National Register of Historic Places in 2008.

== Notable burials ==
- Laura S. Walker, author and conservationist

== Photos ==
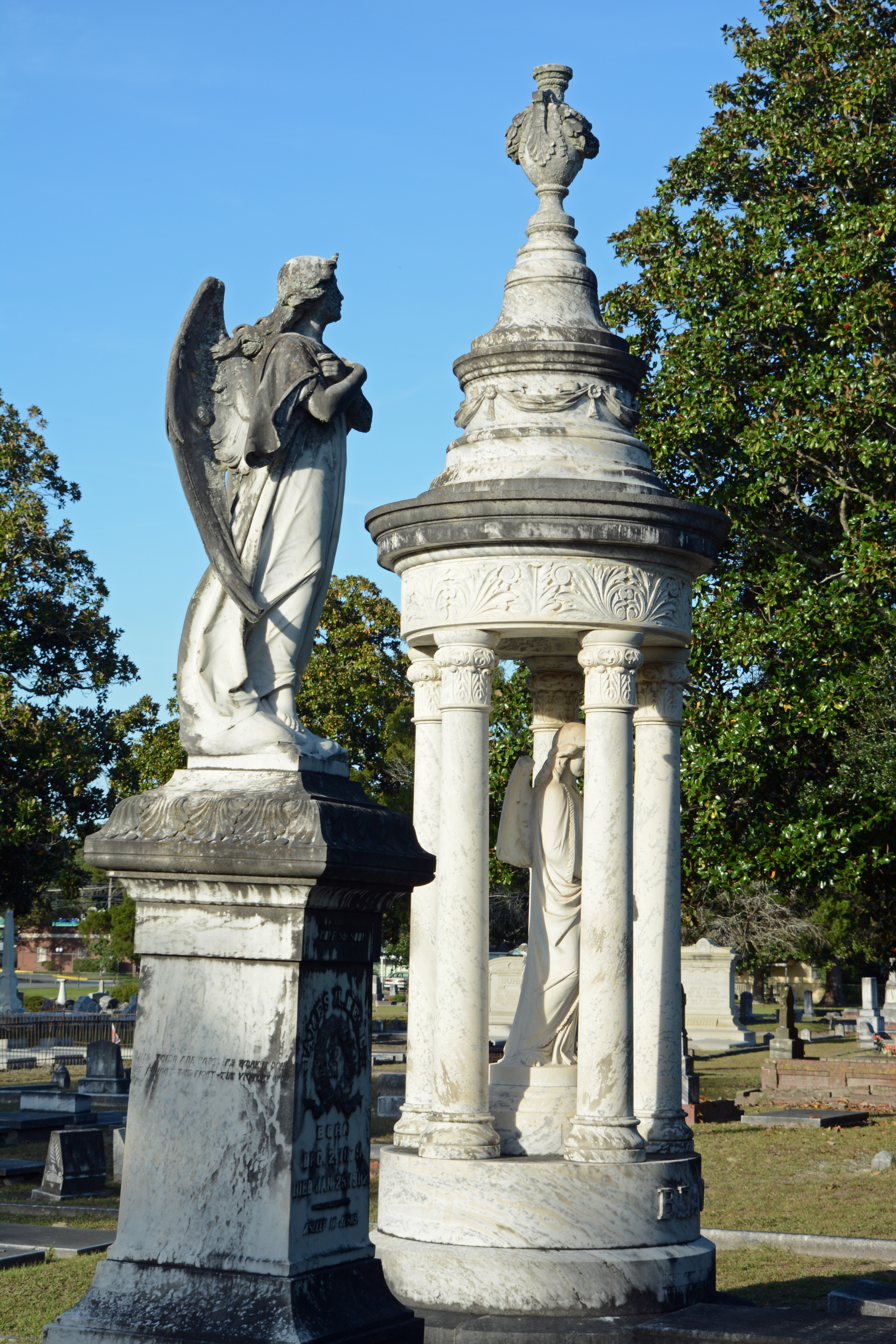

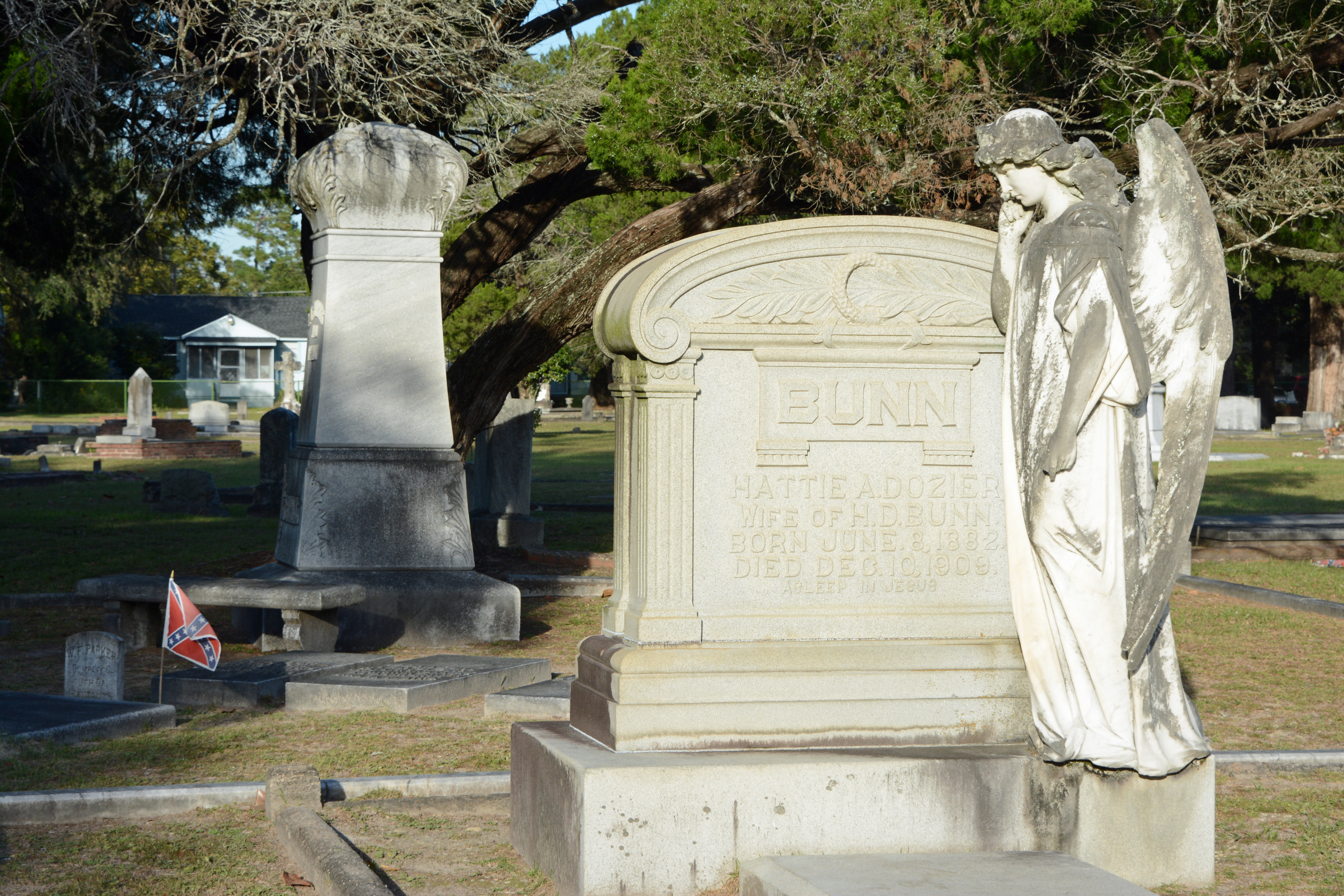

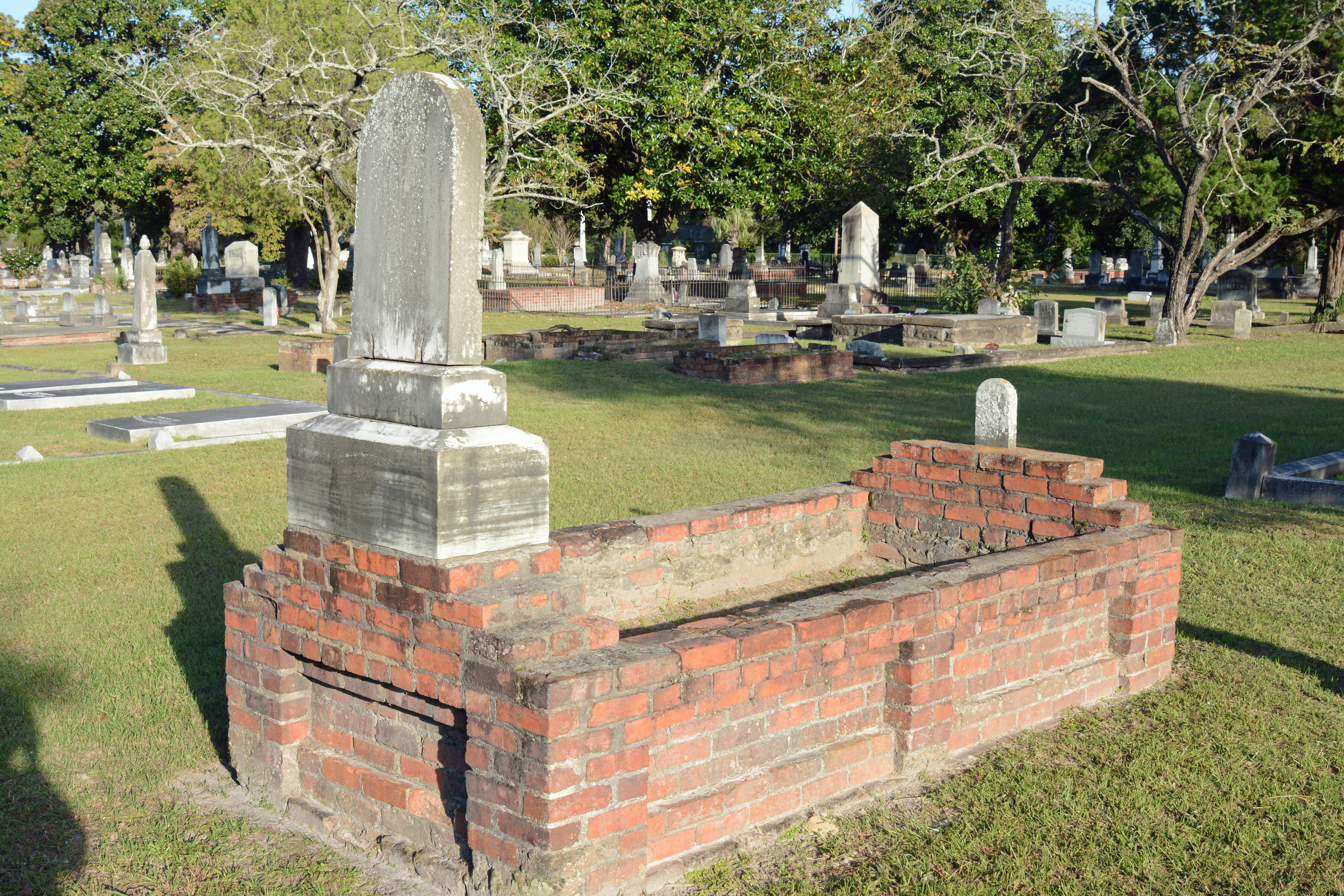

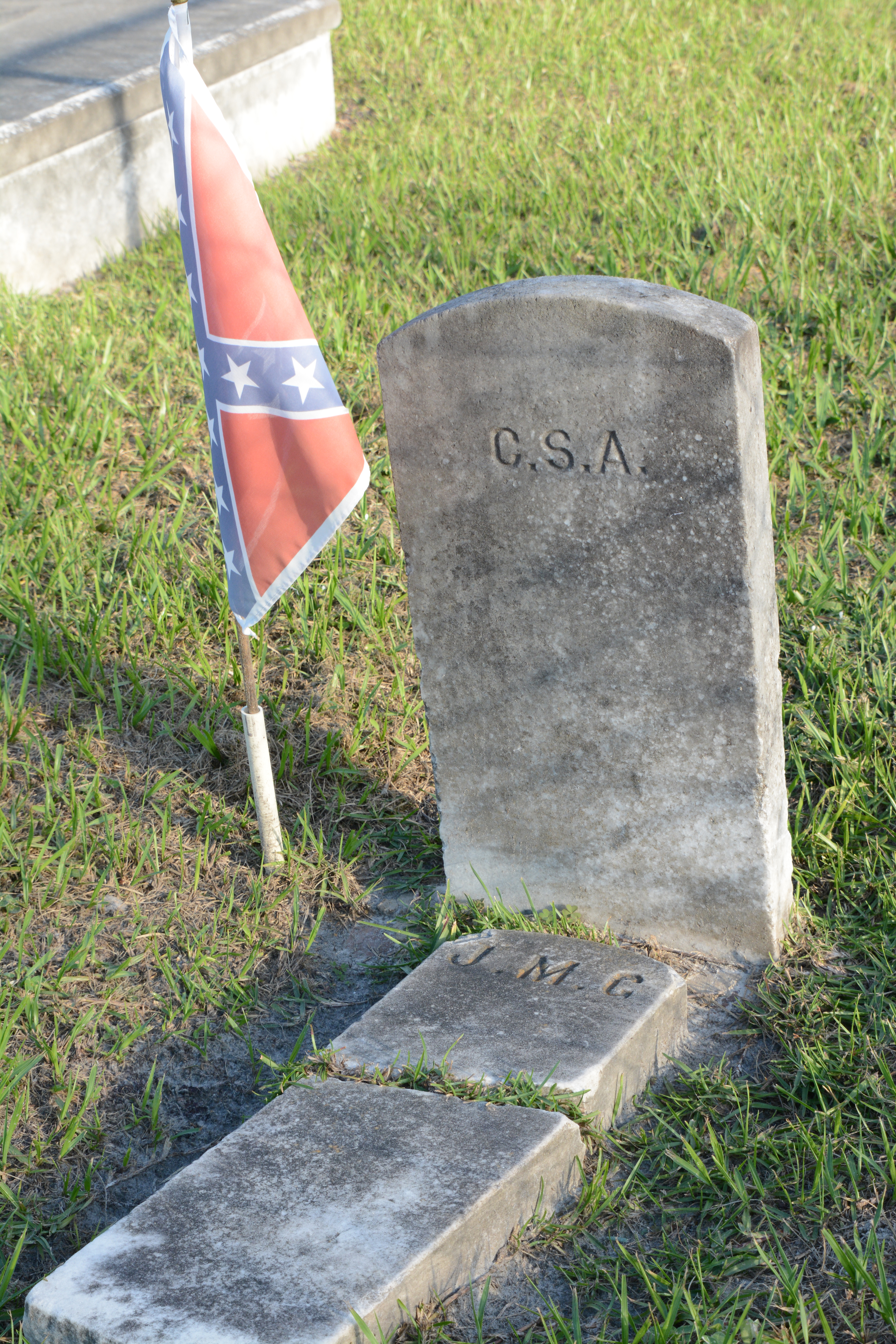
