= Senator Hightower =

Senator Hightower may refer to:

- Bill Hightower (born 1959), Alabama State Senate
- Jack Hightower (1926–2013), Texas State Senate
