= Hightower Forest =

Forest in Dawson County, Georgia

Geography
- Location: Dawson County, Georgia, United States
- Area: 142 acres (57 ha)

Administration
- Authority: Georgia Forestry Commission

Hightower Forest is a state forest in Dawson County, Georgia. The forest is 142 acres and is managed by the Georgia Forestry Commission.

Currently, the Hightower Forest provides education services for teaching student groups of all ages to learn about the importance of forests and forestry. The Etowah River runs through the forest and the forest is also the location of the Georgia Forestry Commission's Dawson County Fire Control unit.

== See also ==
- List of Georgia state forests
