= Battle of Hightower =

Battle in the Cherokee–American wars

Battle of Hightower (Etowah Cliffs)
- Part of Cherokee–American wars
Date	October 17, 1793
Location	Cherokee village called High Town, across the river from modern day Rome, Georgia, between the south Rome bridge and Myrtle Hill Cemetery.
Result	Cherokee defeated

Belligerents
Cherokee	Tennessee Militia

Commanders and leaders
Kingfisher	General John Sevier; Colonel John Blair; Colonel Christian; Colonel Kelly; Captain Evans

Strength
Several hundred Cherokee	800 mounted Tennessee volunteers

Casualties and losses
Over 1,000 Cherokee, including women and children	At least 3 killed and many wounded

The Battle of Hightower (also called Battle of Etowah Cliffs) in 1793 was part of the Cherokee–American wars, in which the Cherokee sought to defend tribal territory from increasing settlement by the citizens of the new United States. This particular battle took place at the Cherokee village of High Town (Itawayi), overlooking downtown Rome in present-day Floyd County, Georgia, resulting in the defeat of the Cherokee by a force led by John Sevier, future Governor of Tennessee.

== Prelude ==
In the 1785 Treaty of Hopewell, the Cherokee agreed to come under the sovereignty of the new United States and the treaty specified boundaries of a huge area of Tennessee, Eastern North Carolina and South Carolina, and Northern Georgia to be reserved as Cherokee hunting grounds. Article 5 stated that any non-Indians settling in this area would lose the protection of the United States and that the Cherokee could punish them any way they pleased.

New settlers continued to move into the Cherokee area, however, and attacks by the Cherokee to drive them out and counter-attacks by the settlers became widespread and vicious. Technically, the United States violated the 1785 Treaty of Hopewell by failing to enforce Article 7, which required the United States to enforce justice on U.S. citizens who murdered Cherokee, and the Cherokee violated the treaty by failing to adhere to Article 9 by trading directly with Spain. Arguments could be made that both sides violated Article 8 regarding retaliation.

== Triggering Event ==
With the approval of President George Washington, an attempt was made to negotiate a new treaty in the Southwest Territory (now the State of Tennessee), but the meeting place was raided by a party headed by John Sevier. Sevier ordered Captain John Beard to attack, and many Cherokee were killed. Washington ordered the arrest and trial of Beard, but Sevier helped him escape and avoid trial.

In retaliation, arguably justified under the "manifest violation" clause of Article 8, John Watts led a war party of over 1,000 Chickamauga Cherokee and Muscogee Creek in a series of attacks against unauthorized settlements on Cherokee land in preparation to attack Knoxville, Tennessee. Near Knoxville Road on the French Broad River, the Cherokee attacked the Cavett's Station settlement with several killed on both sides. The surviving settlers surrendered when Watts offered clemency, but a faction of Cherokee under Doublehead opposed the clemency and started killing the prisoners, including children. James Vann was on Watts' side trying to protect the prisoners from Doublehead's men.

== Battle of Hightower (Etowah Cliffs) ==
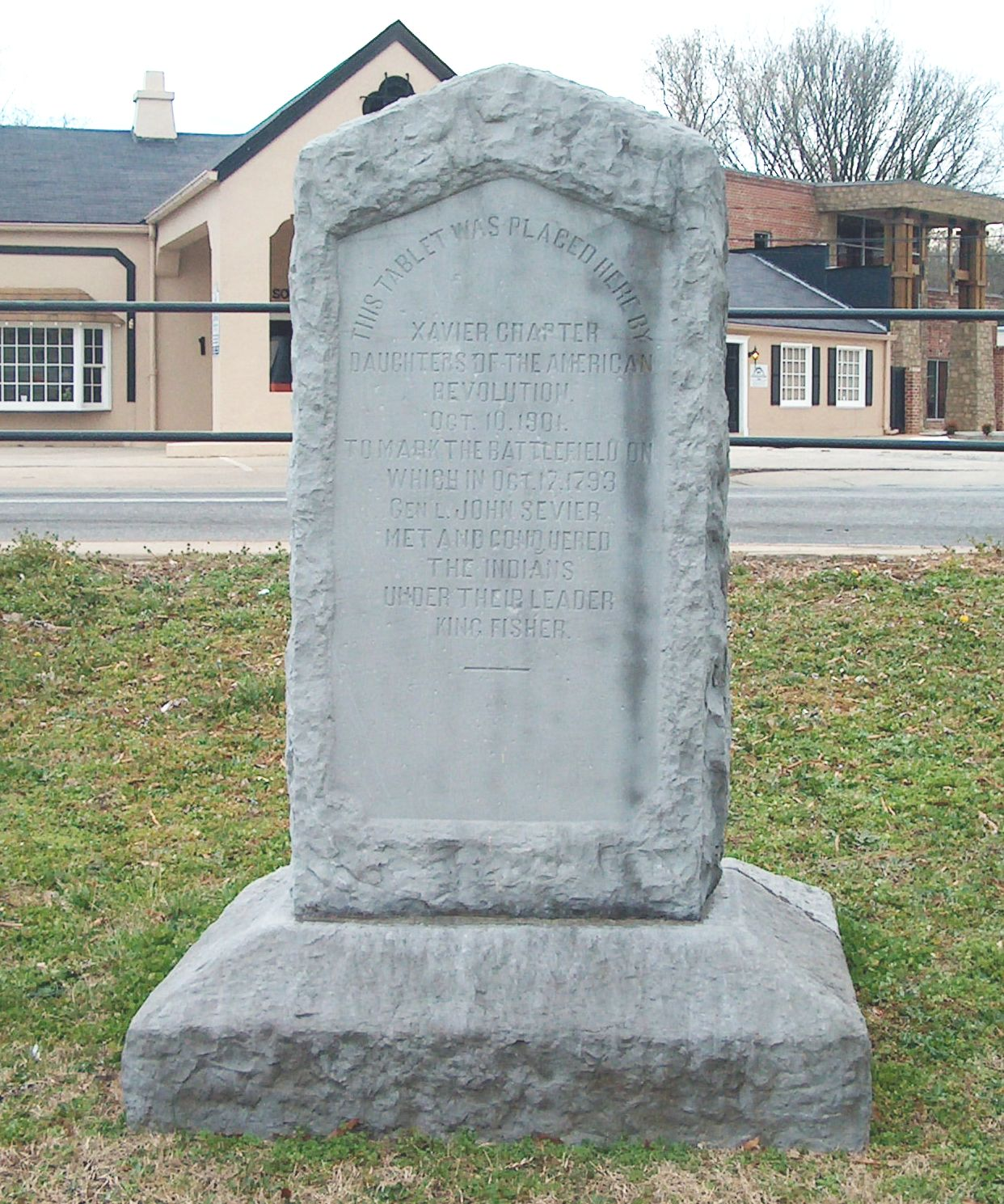
Sevier Monument for Battle of Hightower in Myrtle Hill Cemetery.

Word of the massacre spread quickly and John Sevier raised a force to combat the Cherokee. The Cherokee were forced to divide, with some heading toward Kentucky and some toward North Carolina, but most headed toward Georgia. Sevier's men caught the Cherokee at the village of what he called Hightower (Etowah, or Itawayi), which is near the present-day site of Rome, Georgia. The Cherokee created a defensive position on Myrtle Hill and used a guard to try to prevent Sevier from fording the rivers.

Sevier left a written account of the battle, in which he described an attempt to cross the Etowah River about a mile south of Myrtle Hill, drawing the Cherokee defenders out of their prepared positions, then galloping back to Myrtle Hill to cross there. The Cherokee rushed back to contest the crossing of the Etowah, but failed. When the Red Chief (or war chief) of the Cherokee, Kingfisher, was killed, the remaining warriors fled and Sevier burned the village.

== Aftermath ==
Now unopposed, Sevier's force moved west down the Coosa River destroying Cherokee and Creek villages before returning to the Knoxville area. The "Battle of Hightower" was the last of Sevier's many battles against Native Americans and came to be known as his Etowah campaign. It was the last pitched battle between the Lower Cherokee under John Watts and American forces until the Nickajack Expedition in September 1794.

Myrtle Hill is now a cemetery, and there is a stone on the hill memorializing the battle.
