= John Hightower =

John Hightower may refer to:

- John Hightower (museum director) (1933–2013), American museum director
- John Hightower (American football) (born 1996), American football wide receiver
- Jack Hightower (1926–2013), American politician
