= Tommy Hightower =

American football player and coach

Playing career
- 1954–1957: Eastern New Mexico
- Positions: Fullback, defensive back

Coaching career (HC unless noted)
- 1966–1968: Western New Mexico

Head coaching record
- Overall: 10–15

Tommy Hightower is a retired American football coach. He served as the head football coach at Western New Mexico University from 1966 to 1968 where he achieved a record of 10–15.

Hightower played college football for the Eastern New Mexico University where he was a star fullback and defensive back.
