= Monteria Hightower =

American librarian (1929–2025)

- Born: November 20, 1929; Nacogdoches, Texas, U.S.
- Died: August 7, 2025 (aged 95)
- Education: University of Maryland College of Information Studies, MLS
- Alma mater: Butler College (Texas)
- Occupation: Librarian
- Awards: Librarian of the Year, Nevada Library Association, 1998

Monteria Hightower (November 20 1929 – August 7, 2025) was an American librarian. She was formerly the Administrator of the State Library and Archives for Nevada, the first Black state librarian in Nevada, and the fifth Black state librarian in the United States. She was the State Librarian of Missouri from 1986 through 1994 where she was the first Black state librarian.

Hightower worked as State Librarian of Missouri beginning in 1986. During that time oversight of the library shifted from the department of education to the Secretary of State's office. Hightower was able to implement a few major programs during her time there including getting Missouri State Library designated as a Center for the Book by the Library of Congress and organizing the Missouri Governor's Conference on Library and Information Services. Hightower was accused in a memo of using "the 'race' issue" to get what she wanted to which she responded "I don't need race. I'm trained for my job." Hightower felt she was being asked to give patronage jobs and special privileges to family and friends of state employees, including opening the state library on Mother's Day so the governor's son could complete his homework, and resigned her job in protest in September 1994.

She moved to Nevada and worked in the Clark County library system until she assumed her role at the State Library of Nevada in April 1999. She worked there until her retirement in October, 2000. She was named Librarian of the Year by the Nevada Library Association in 1998.

She has also worked as the director of the Central Services division of Seattle Public Library from 1982 through 1986 as their first Black administrator, and supervisor of branches at DC Public Library. She has worked at Los Angeles Public Library and public libraries in Maryland and Connecticut. She is the author of the book Commonalities and Diversities in Public Library Programming in a Pluralistic Society, Serving Our Ethnic Publics, published in 1976.

Hightower served as a Councillor for the American Library Association as a member of the Black Caucus where she took ALA to task for not making more hires of people of color.

Hightower died on August 7, 2025, at the age of 95. She was interred at Inglewood Park Cemetery.

== Early life and education ==
Hightower was born in Nacogdoches, Texas in 1929 to Harrison and Laura Hightower. She graduated from Butler College in Texas and received her MLS from the University of Maryland Library School in 1970.
