= Bankhead–Jones Farm Tenant Act of 1937 =

U.S. Act which authorized a credit program to assist tenant farmers in purchasing land

The Bankhead–Jones Farm Tenant Act
- Long title: An Act to create the Farmers’ Home Corporation, to promote secure occupancy of farms and farm homes, to correct the economic instability resulting from some present forms of farm tenancy, and for other purposes.
- Acronyms (colloquial): BJFTA
- Enacted by: the 75th United States Congress
- Effective: July 22, 1937

Citations
- Public law: Pub. L. 75–210
- Statutes at Large: 50 Stat. 522

Codification
- Titles amended: 7 U.S.C.: Agriculture
- U.S.C. sections created: 7 U.S.C. ch. 33 § 1000

Legislative history
- Introduced in the House as H.R. 7562; Passed the House on June 29, 1937 (308-25); Signed into law by President Franklin D. Roosevelt on July 22, 1937

The Bankhead–Jones Farm Tenant Act of 1937 (P.L. 75-210) was passed on July 22, 1937, and authorized acquisition by the federal government of damaged lands to rehabilitate and use them for various purposes. Most importantly, however, the law authorized a modest credit program to assist tenant farmers to purchase land, and it was the culmination of a long effort to secure legislation for their benefit.

== Management of Bankhead–Jones lands ==
Both the U.S. Forest Service and the Bureau of Land Management manage some Bankhead–Jones lands. Some Forest Service Bankhead-Jones lands are National Grasslands.

== State park ==
In 1937, the federal government purchased distressed farmland for the Laura S. Walker State Park under a Federal Land Utilization Program authorized by the Bankhead–Jones Farm Tenant Act. The park was named for Waycross, Georgia, conservationist Laura S. Walker, in recognition of her work promoting forestry and other civic activities. Work on the park was undertaken by the Works Progress Administration and the Civilian Conservation Corps. In 1941, the national park was deeded over to Georgia, becoming the State's 13th state park.

== First tenant farmer loan repayment ==
In February 1943, Roddie and Lucile Pridgett of Rankin County, Mississippi, "became the first Negro farm family in the United States to repay their 36-year farm purchase loan to the Farm Security Administration which they obtained under the provisions of the Bankhead–Jones Tenant Purchase Act." They repaid their loan of $1,495 in only five years.
