= Alma Julia Hightower =

American musician (1888–1970)

Alma Hightower
- Born: Alma Julia Webster; 27 November 1888; Baton Rouge, Louisiana, U.S.
- Died: 1 August 1970 (aged 81); Los Angeles, California, U.S.
- Other name: Mrs. Alma Hightower
- Occupations: Musician, Vocalist, Teacher, Composer, Band Leader
- Known for: teaching many students who became noted musicians

Alma Julia Hightower (November 27, 1888 – August 1, 1970) was an American vocalist, musician and music teacher. From the early 1920s to the mid-1960s she taught thousands of children and adults, many of whom became outstanding performers, such as Clarence McDonald.

== Biography ==
She was born Alma Julia Webster on November 27, 1888, in Baton Rouge, Louisiana, and had at least four siblings, three brothers and a sister.

She moved to Los Angeles, California, in the 1920s, first living with her nephew Alton Redd. She later moved to a rented house at 1553½ East 33rd Street in Los Angeles for a number of years and began her career as a musician, composer, band leader and music teacher mostly at her Hightower Music Studio and Conservatory in Los Angeles, California, on Vernon Avenue between Mettler Street and Towne Avenue. She was an accomplished musician who played saxophone, drums and piano.

=== The WPA ===
During the years of the Work Projects Administration (WPA), 1936–43, Hightower participated in the arts, drama, media and literacy projects of the WPA, where she taught hundreds of young people to act, dance, sing and play musical instruments at the Ross Snyder Recreation Center.

The WPA was a large and ambitious New Deal agency that employed millions to carry out public works projects, including the construction of public buildings and roads. It fed children and distributed food, clothing, and housing. Almost every community in the United States had a park, bridge or school constructed by the agency, which especially benefited rural and Western populations. The budget at the outset of the WPA in 1935 was 1.4 billion dollars. There were an estimated 10 million unemployed persons at the time and the WPA provided work for three million of them. Expenditure from 1936 to 1939 totaled nearly $7 billion and by 1943, the total amount spent was more than $11 billion.

=== Music studio on Vernon Avenue ===
Hightower purchased a half-acre of property at 466 East Vernon Avenue on July 14, 1943, where she had rental apartments and a Music Studio Conservatory constructed from a four-car garage.

=== Family ===
Alma was married briefly to a man named Hightower. In about 1927 she adopted the young daughter (Minnie Alma) of a Louisiana friend. She also had a very large extended family in the children of her siblings, her nephews and nieces including Alton Redd, Daniel Webster, Geraldine and Fred Thompson, Hazel Stanislaus, Vivian Carrington, Dorothy Lawson and Allen Webster. She was also the great-aunt of alto saxophonist and vocalist Vi Redd, and was known as Aunt Alma to her many nieces and nephews, "Bamma" to the three children (Clifford Allan, Walter Michael and Deborah Juliana) of her adopted daughter Minnie Moore Hightower; and Mrs. Hightower to the many students who studied music with her. In 1947, Minnie Hightower played in an all-female band that opened the Flamingo Hotel in Las Vegas. The group was called The Four Queens and included Elyse Blye on piano, Doris Jarrett on bass, Minnie on alto sax and Clora Bryant on trumpet.

Alma Hightower died on August 1, 1970, in Los Angeles, at the age of 81.

== Legacy ==
On November 30, 2007, she was one of 32 entertainers honored at the Community Build Park in Los Angeles.

== Notable students ==
Many of Hightower's students became renowned musicians, including:

- Chico Hamilton, percussionist
- Charles Mingus, bassist, composer and band leader
- Illinois Jacquet, woodwind player
- Ernie Royal, guitarist and trumpeter
- Buddy Collette, woodwind player
- Dexter Gordon, tenor saxophonist
- Sonny Stitt, tenor saxophonist
- Melba Liston, trombonist
- Big Jay McNeely, tenor saxophonist
- Clora Bryant, trumpeter
- Vi Redd, alto saxophonist
- Roy Ayers, xylophonist, percussionist
- Clarence McDonald, keyboard player and record producer.
