= Bartram Forest Wildlife Management Area =

State land tract in Georgia, U.S.

Bartram Forest Wildlife Management Area (formerly known as Bartram Educational Forest and as Bartram State Forest) is a 2,113-acre (9 km^{2}) state land tract in Baldwin County and Wilkinson County, Georgia, United States. The forest was named in honor of naturalists John Bartram (1699-1777) and his son William Bartram (1739-1823).

Bartram Forest WMA is located near the city of Milledgeville at geographic coordinates 33°01.290′N 83°12.284′W. It occupies property formerly used as a farm for patients of nearby Central State Hospital. Owned by the state of Georgia and managed by the Georgia Forestry Commission (GFC), Bartram Forest offers recreational opportunities such as trail running, hiking, and mountain biking in addition to archery hunting, timber, and wildlife habitat. One popular hiking/biking trail passes by a weather station.
