= Mary Osborne =

American jazz musician (1921–1992)

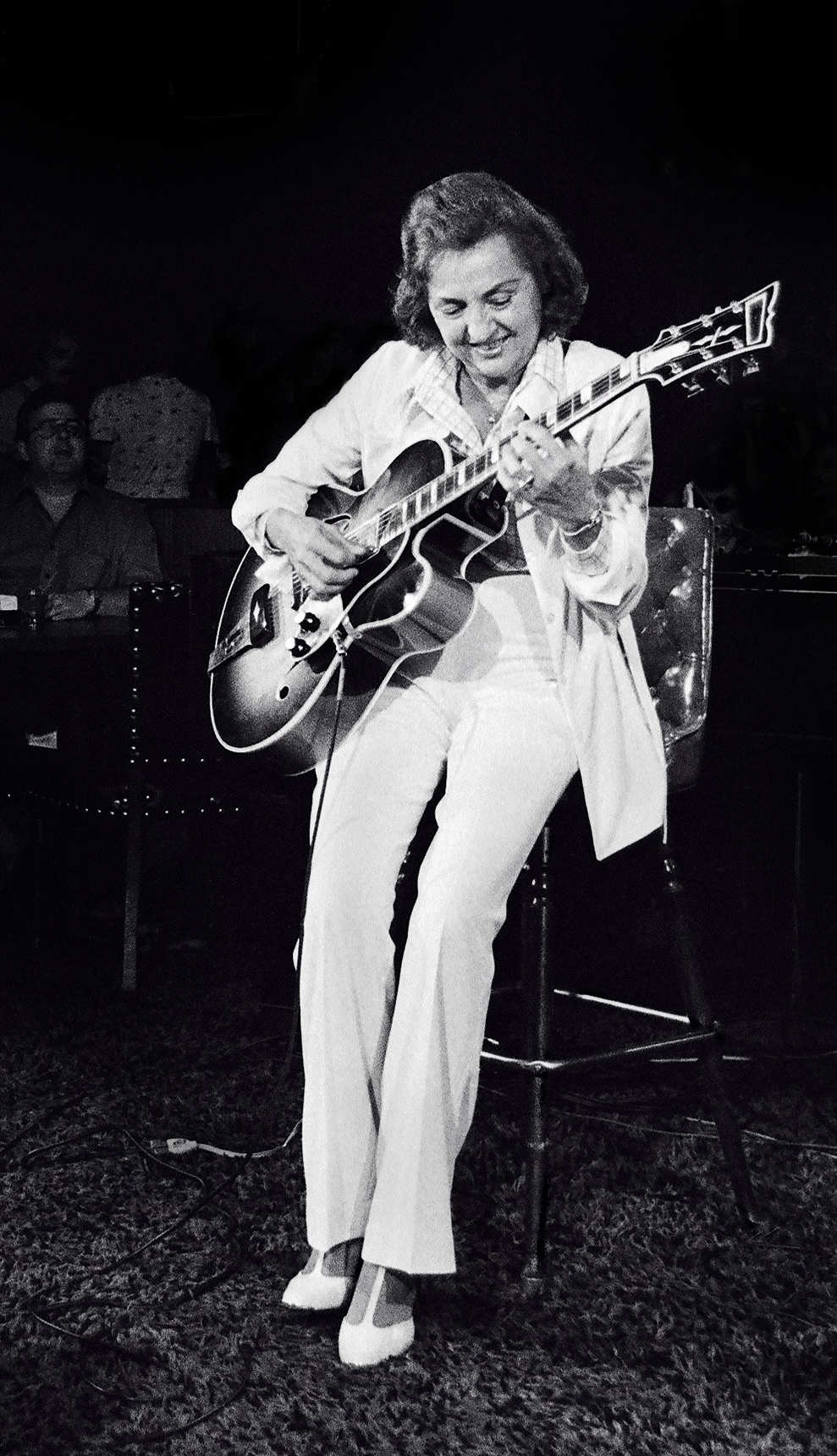
- Osborne in Rochester, New York, 1977

Background information
- Born: Mary Osborne; July 17, 1921; Minot, North Dakota, U.S.
- Died: March 4, 1992 (aged 70) Bakersfield, California, U.S.
- Genres: Jazz
- Occupation: Musician
- Instrument: Guitar
- Years active: 1940s–1960s

Mary Osborne (July 17, 1921 – March 4, 1992) was an American jazz guitarist. She began performing at a young age and was featured on a radio program in North Dakota, where she grew up. In New York City during the 1940s, she played with jazz musicians such as Dizzy Gillespie, Billie Holiday, Art Tatum, Coleman Hawkins, and Thelonious Monk. After moving to California in 1968, she and her husband founded the Osborne Guitar Company.

== Biography ==
Osborne was born in Minot, North Dakota, the tenth of eleven children. Her family was musically inclined; her mother played guitar and her father, in addition to constructing violins, allowed his barbershop to be the meeting place for the town's musicians. As early as 3 years of age, she showed an interest in music. Osborne's earliest instruments included piano, ukulele, violin, and banjo. At age nine, she first played the guitar. At ten, she started playing banjo in her father's ragtime band. She also came to be featured on her own radio program, which she would continue to perform on twice weekly until she was fifteen. At twelve she started her own trio of girls to perform in Bismarck, North Dakota. The music she was playing during this time period was largely "hillbilly", or country music, in which the guitar was simply used to accompany her own vocals.

At the age of fifteen, Osborne joined a trio led by pianist Winifred McDonnell, for which she played guitar, double bass, and sang. During this time, she heard Charlie Christian play electric guitar in Al Trent's band at a stop in Bismarck. She was enthralled by his sound, at first mistaking the electric guitar for a saxophone. She said of it, "What impressed everyone most of all was his sense of time. He had a relaxed, even beat that would sound modern even today." Osborne immediately bought her own electric guitar and had a friend build an amplifier. She sat in with Christian, learning his style of guitar. Later, McDonnell's trio was absorbed into Buddy Rogers's band, after Rogers heard them play in St. Louis. But within a year of the band moving to New York in 1940, the trio broke up and left Rogers's band, having found husbands. Osborne married trumpeter Ralph Scaffidi, who encouraged her musical career.

In the 1940s, Osborne sat in on jam sessions on 52nd Street, where she played with some of the biggest names in jazz. In 1941, she went on the road with jazz violinist Joe Venuti. In 1942, she was working freelance in Chicago when she made a recording with Stuff Smith. In 1945, Osborne headlined a performance with Dizzy Gillespie, Art Tatum, Coleman Hawkins, and Thelonious Monk in Philadelphia, to reviews and audiences that praised her specifically. Osborne, Tatum, and Hawkins went on to record in concert in New Orleans.

In 1945, Osborne returned to New York. There she recorded with Mary Lou Williams in 1945, Coleman Hawkins, Mercer Ellington, and Beryl Booker in 1946, and led her own swing trio. Her trio lasted from 1945 to 1948 and played in clubs on 52nd street, had a year-long engagement at Kelly's Stables, and made several recordings. Throughout the 1950s, she played with Elliot Lawrence's Quartet on The Jack Sterling Show, a daily morning CBS radio program, and appeared on the television show Arthur Godfrey's Talent Scouts. The last few years of the decade she spent recording, both with Tyree Glenn and as a leader. Shortly after, Osborne felt that she had been doing the same thing musically for too long and wanted a change. In 1962, she started learning Spanish classical guitar under Alberto Valdez-Blaine. She used classical techniques, such as pick-less playing, in her jazz playing.

In 1968, Osborne moved to Bakersfield, California, where she lived the rest of her life. With her husband, she founded the Osborne Guitar Company. She taught music and continued to play jazz locally and in Los Angeles. She played in the Newport and Concord festivals in the early 1970s, and in the Kool Jazz Festival in New York in 1981. In 1989 and 1990, she played at the Los Angeles Classic Jazz Festival, and in 1990 also played at the Playboy Jazz Marathon. In 1991, in what would be her final performances, Osborne returned to the Village Vanguard in New York for a week-long engagement.

Osborne died in March 1992 at the age of 70, the result of chronic leukemia.

In 2017, she was inducted into the Bakersfield Music Hall of Fame.

== Discography ==
- A Girl and Her Guitar (Warwick, 1959)
- Now's the Time (Halcyon, 1977)
- Now and Then (Stash, 1981)
- Esquire's All-American Hot Jazz Sessions (RCA, 1988) with the 52nd Street All-Stars, RCA Studio 2, New York City, February 27, 1946. Produced by Leonard Feather

With Louis Bellson and Gene Krupa

- The Mighty Two (Roulette, 1963)
