= Laura S. Walker State Park =

State park in Georgia, United States

- Laura Walker State Park
- IUCN category III (natural monument or feature)
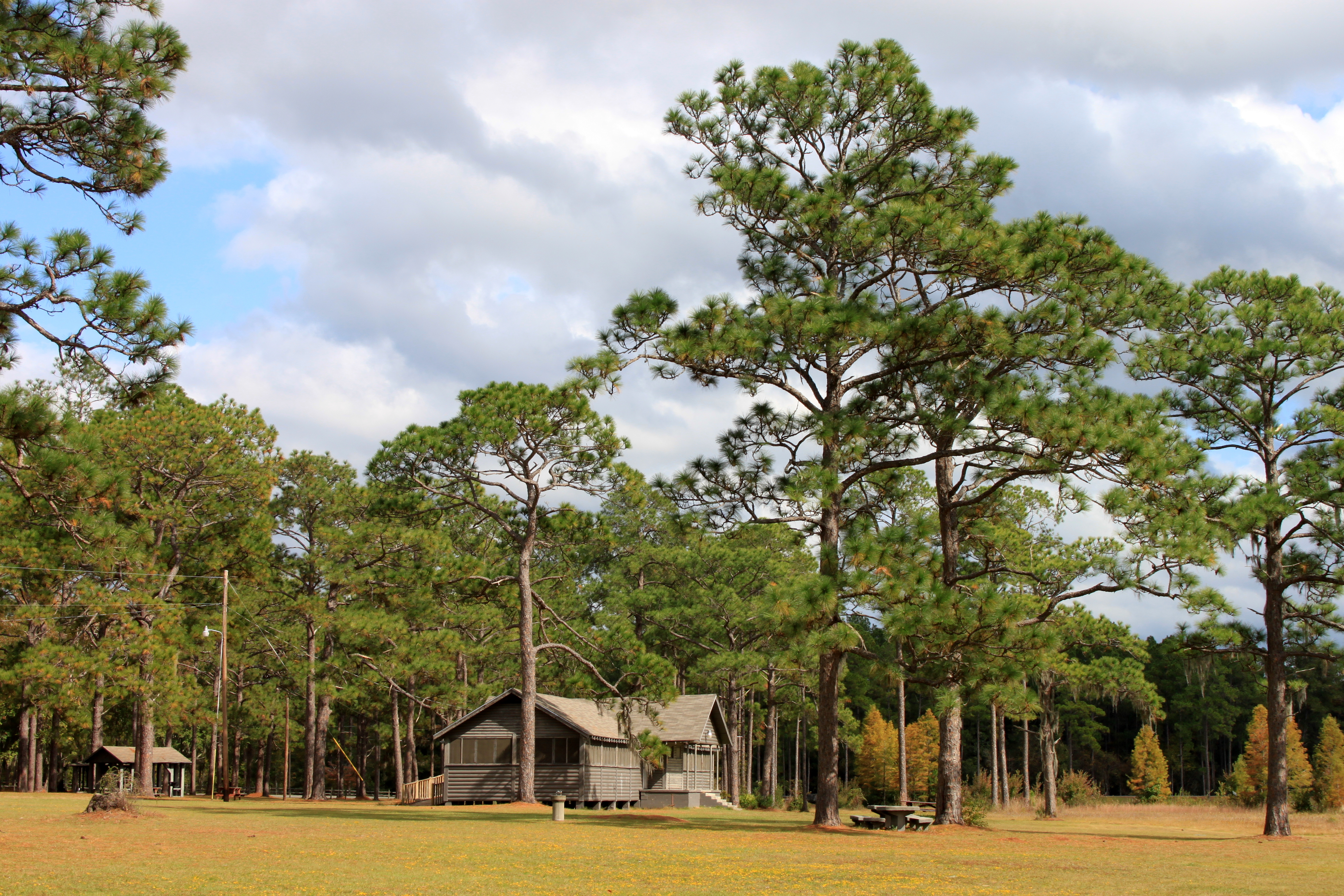
- Laura S. Walker State Park

- Location within Georgia Location within the United States
- Location: Ware County, Georgia
- Nearest city: Waycross, Georgia
- Coordinates: 31.142°N 82.217°W
- Area: 626 acres (253 ha)
- Established: 1937
- Governing body: Georgia Department of Natural Resources

Laura S. Walker State Park is a 626-acre (253 ha) state park in the U.S. state of Georgia. Located near Hoboken and the Okefenokee Swamp, the park is named after Laura S. Walker, a Georgia writer, teacher, civic leader, and naturalist (she is most famous as the latter). The park's location near the Okefenokee makes it home to many exotic plant and animal species, including alligators, great blue herons, and pitcher plants. The park includes a 120-acre (49 ha) lake and a championship 18-hole golf course with a pro shop.

== History ==
In the 1930s an effort was made to recognize Waycross, Georgia, conservationist Laura S. Walker for her work promoting forestry and other civic activities. At the urging of Georgia's senators, President Franklin D. Roosevelt issued a proclamation to establish the Laura S. Walker National Park in her honor. She was the only living person for whom a state or national park was named. In 1937, the federal government purchased distressed farmland for the park under a federal land utilization program authorized by the Bankhead-Jones Farm Tenant Act. Work on the park was undertaken by the Works Progress Administration and the Civilian Conservation Corps. In 1941, the national park was deeded over to Georgia, becoming the state's 13th state park.

== Facilities ==
- 42 Tent/Trailer/RV Campsites
- 6 Cottages
- 7 Picnic Shelters
- 4 Group Shelters
- 1 Group Camp
- 1 Pioneer Campground
- Swimming Beach
- Kayak Rentals
- Bicycle Rentals

== Gallery ==
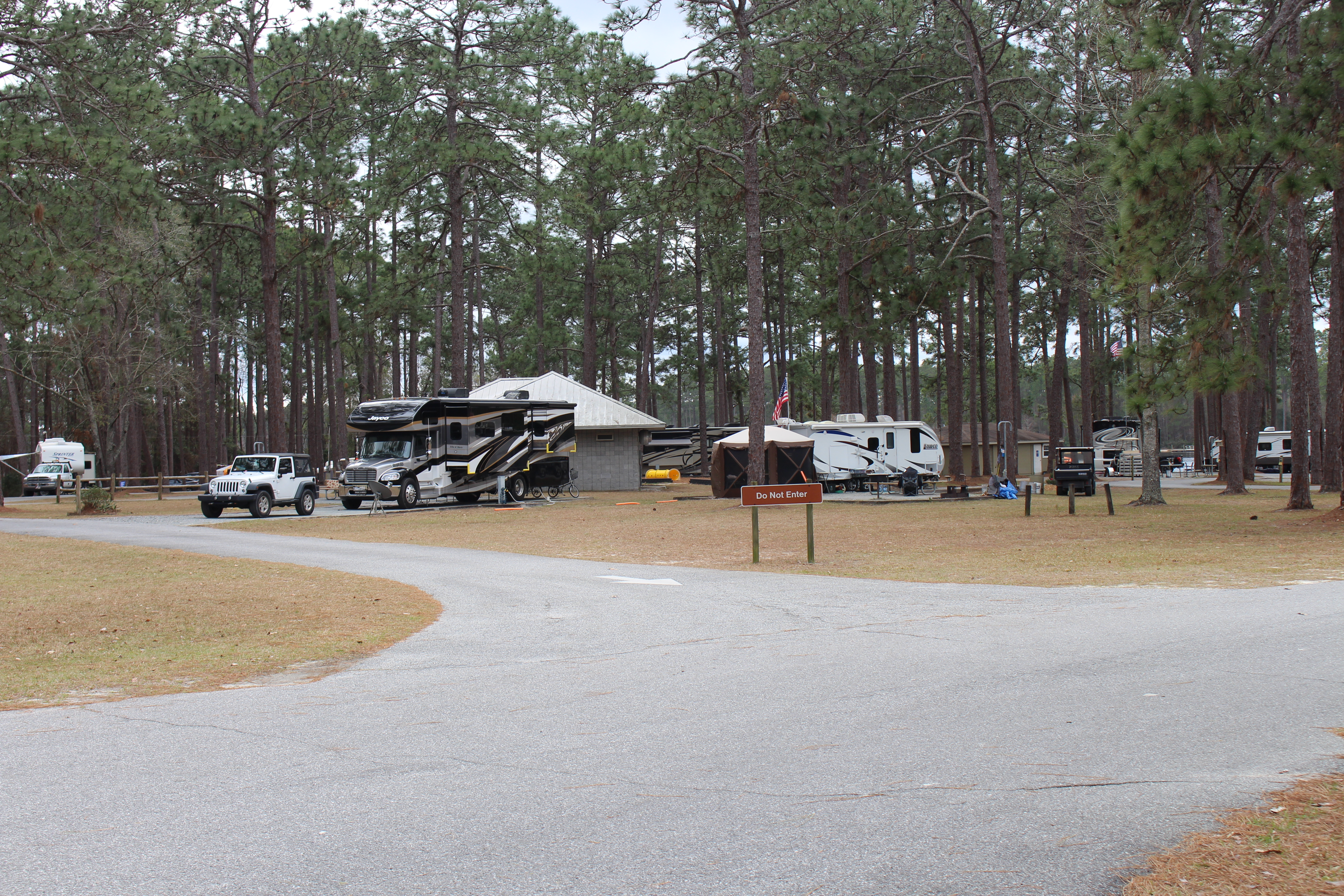
Tent and trailer campsites

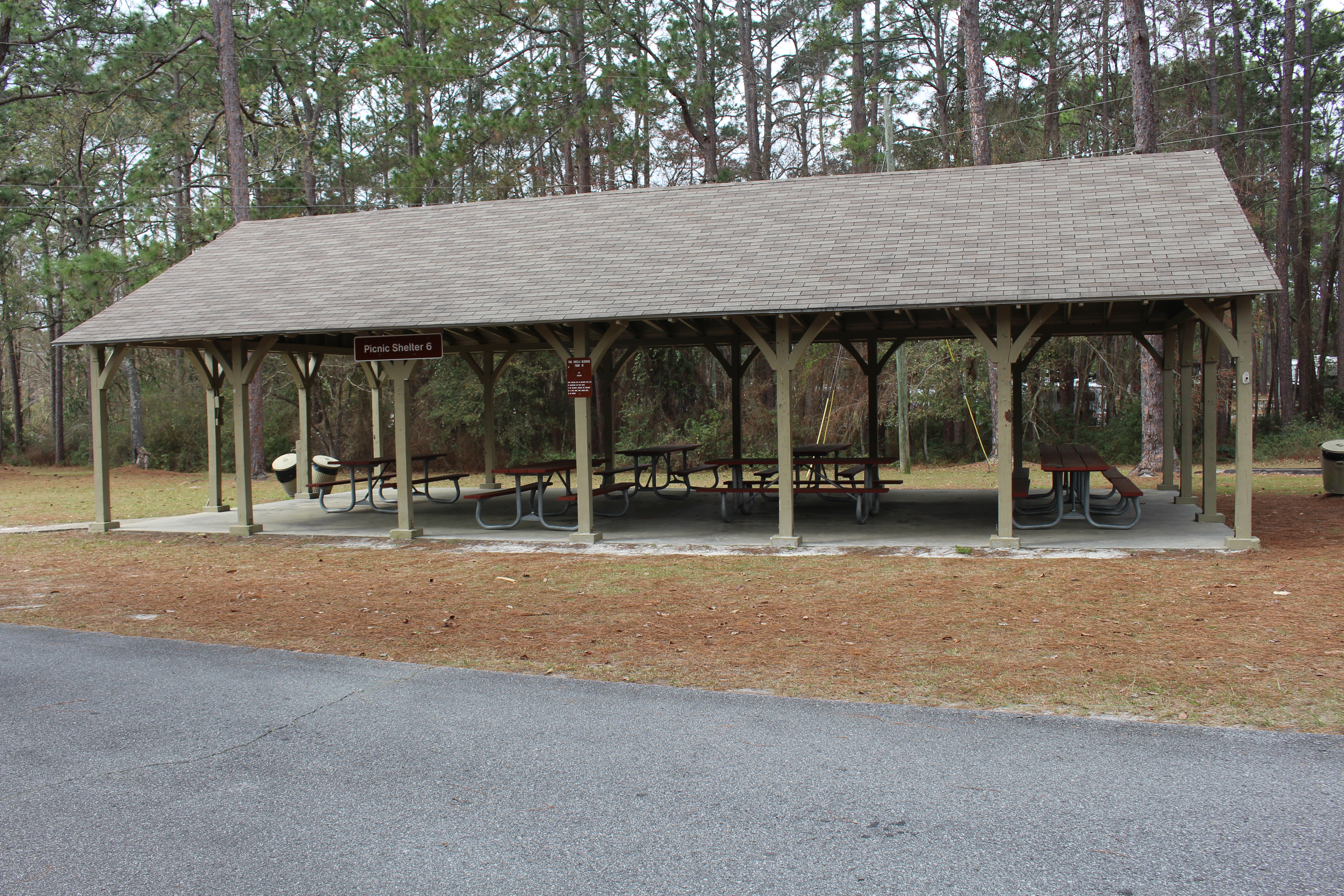
Picnic shelter

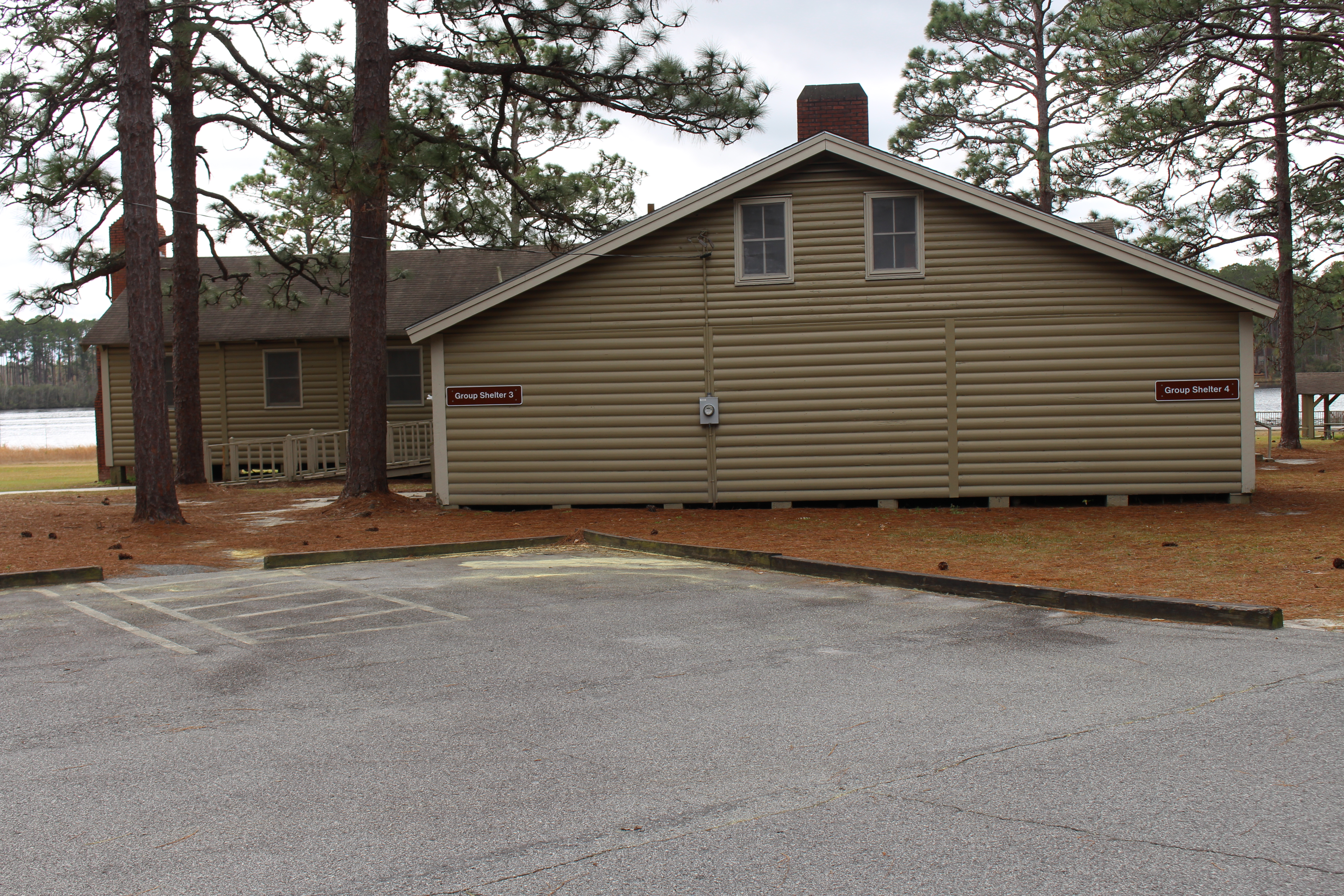
Group shelter

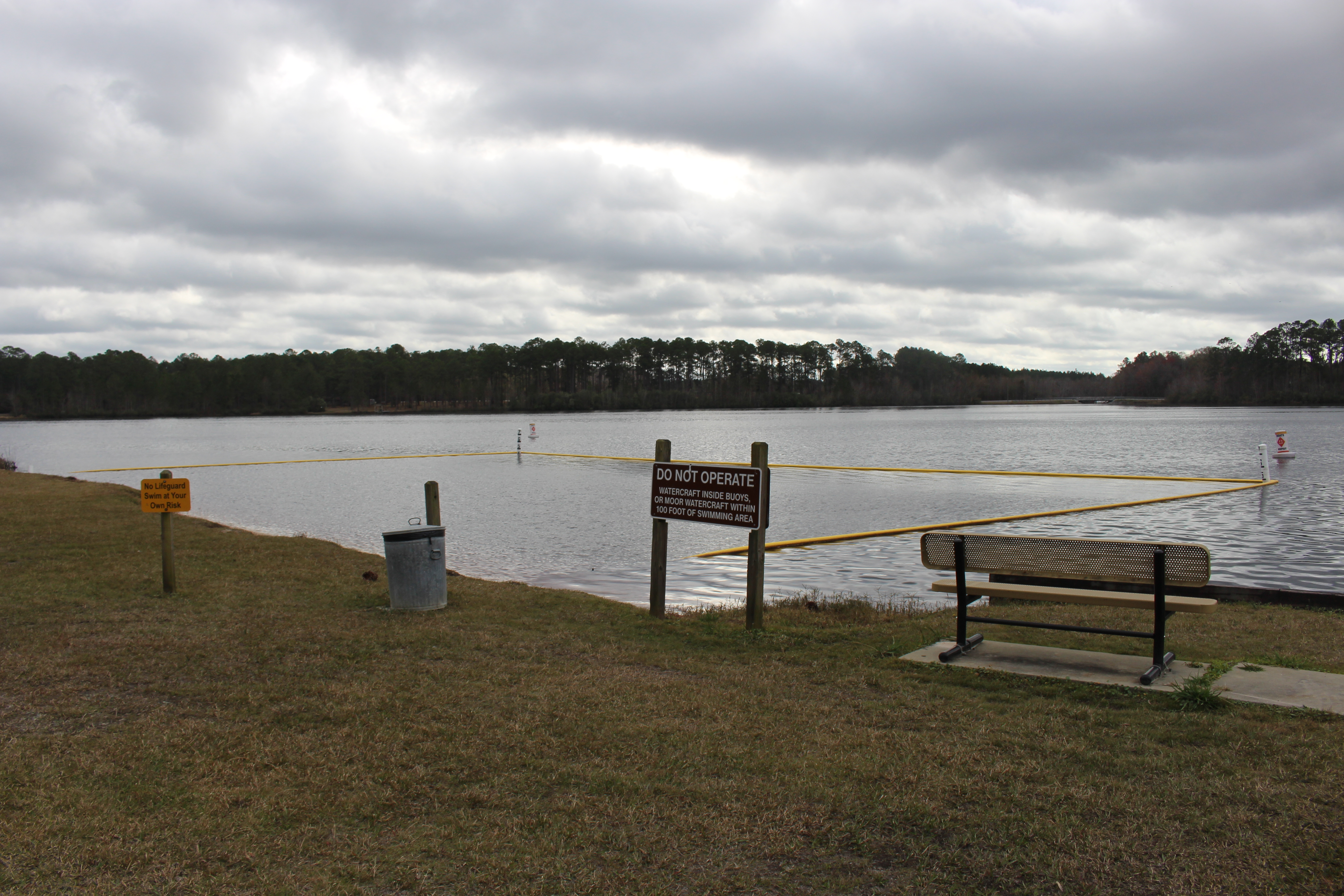
Swimming area

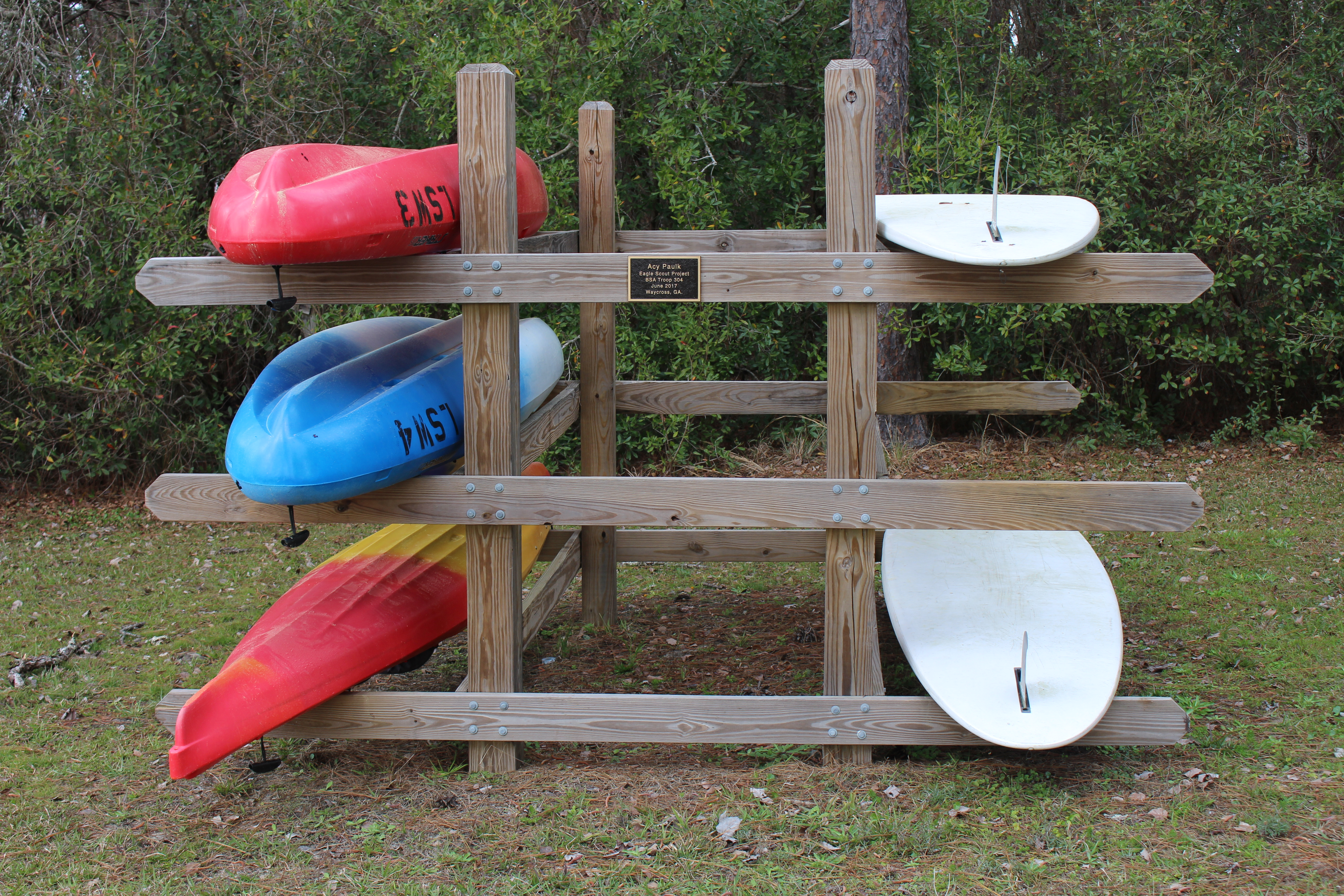
Kayak and paddle board rentals

== Annual events ==
- Okefenokee 10K Race (March)
