= Georgia State Route 25 =

State highway in Georgia

State Route 25
- Coastal Highway; Ocean Highway
- Georgia State Route 25 highlighted in red

Route information
- Maintained by GDOT
- Length: 128.77 mi (207.24 km)
- Existed: 1919–present
- Tourist routes: Altamaha Historic Scenic Byway

Major junctions
- South end: US 17 / SR 5 at the Florida state line south of Kingsland
- US 82 / SR 303 / SR 520 west of Brunswick; US 341 / SR 27 in Brunswick; US 25 / SR 25 Conn. in Brunswick; US 84 / SR 38 in Midway; I-95 in Richmond Hill; I-516 / US 80 / SR 21 / SR 26 in Savannah; I-16 / US 17 in Savannah
- North end: SC 170 at the South Carolina state line in Port Wentworth

Location
- Country: United States
- State: Georgia
- Counties: Camden, Glynn, McIntosh, Liberty, Bryan, Chatham

Highway system
- Georgia State Highway System; Interstate; US; State; Special
| ← US 25 | → SR 26 |

State Route 25 (SR 25) is a state highway in the eastern part of the U.S. state of Georgia. It travels south-to-north near the Atlantic Ocean, serving the Brunswick and Savannah metropolitan areas on its path from the Florida state line at the St. Marys River to the South Carolina state line at the Little Back River, a channel of the Savannah River. Except for the northern part of the highway, from Savannah to Port Wentworth, it is concurrent with U.S. Route 17 (US 17) for its entire length.

SR 25 formerly traveled on part of what is now SR 303 west of Brunswick and US 25/US 341/SR 27 in the city. US 17/SR 25, as well as US 80/SR 26 in Savannah utilized portions of Montgomery Street, West Broad Street (now known as Martin Luther King Jr. Boulevard), and Bay Street, through the central part of the city.

== Route description ==
All of SR 25 that is concurrent with US 17 that does not have a local street name is known as Ocean Highway (alternatively spelled "Ocean Hiway"), which was the name of an auto trail established in 1935 connecting Jacksonville, Florida with New York, New York. The Georgia General Assembly made the Ocean Hiway designation official in a 1958 resolution that recognized the concerted advertising effort of the Ocean Hiway Association, its impact on tourism, and the signage of the highway in the coastal states to the north. SR 25 travels concurrently with US 17 for almost its entire length in the state. The highways split at the I-16/I-516 interchange in Savannah; US 17 follows I-16 and its unsigned companion SR 404 and then SR 404 Spur to the South Carolina state line at the Savannah River, while SR 25 heads northwest along the old route of US 17 to Port Wentworth to cross the river upstream from the city. SR 25 is a part of the National Highway System from an intersection with the southern terminus of SR 303 west of Brunswick to SR 25 Spur in Brunswick, and from a point about halfway between Midway and Richmond Hill to the South Carolina state line.

=== Kingsland to Brunswick ===
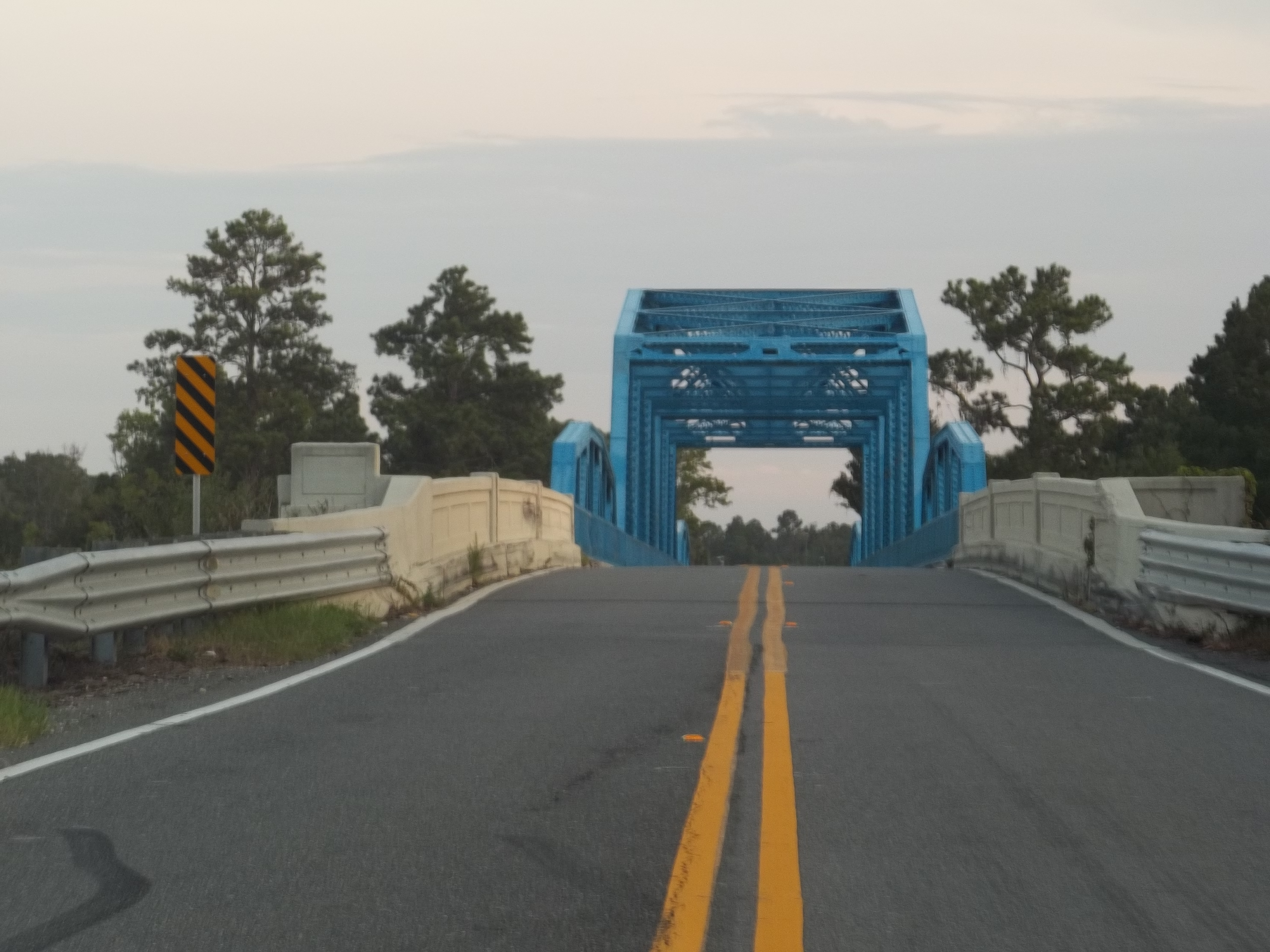
Bridge that US 17 and SR 25 use to cross over the St. Mary's River

SR 25 begins at the Florida state line, where US 17 enters Camden County from Nassau County, Florida by crossing the St. Marys River on a through truss bridge. The two-lane highway closely parallels some railroad tracks of the First Coast Railroad, formerly part of the Seaboard Air Line Railroad (now CSX Transportation) through the southern part of the county. US 17/SR 25 crosses Catfish Creek before entering the city of Kingsland. The highways travel through the city as Lee Street, which crosses the St. Mary's Railroad at its junction with the First Coast line just south of SR 40 (King Street), which parallels the railroad east to St. Marys. Leaving Kingsland, the highway crosses over a spur from the rail line and crosses the main flow and the North Fork Crooked River. US 17/SR 25 parallels the First Coast Railroad to its terminus at the hamlet of Seals. The highway travels through Colesburg before entering the city of Woodbine, the county seat of Camden County. Within the city, US 17/SR 25 follows four-lane divided Bedell Avenue, which intersects SR 25 Spur (10th Street), a connector between the center of town and I-95. The highway intersects and begins to travel concurrently with SR 110 (4th Street) within the Woodbine Historic District. US 17/SR 25 and SR 110 reduce to two lanes and leave town by crossing the Satilla River.

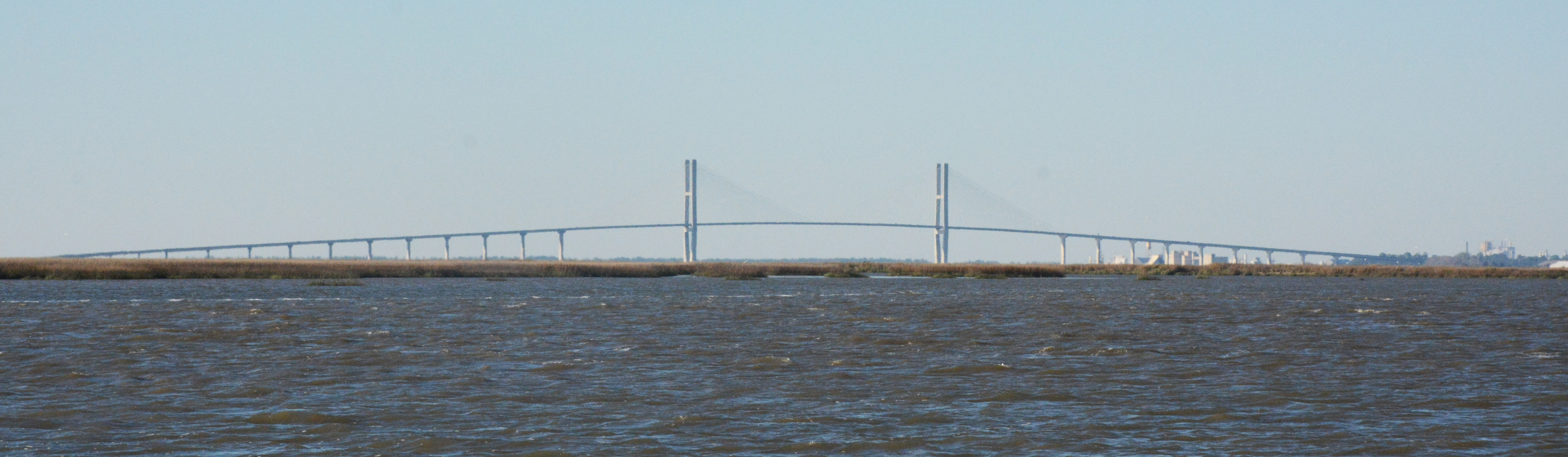
US 17/SR 25 uses the Sidney Lanier Bridge south of Brunswick.

US 17/SR 25 and SR 110 cross Piney Island Creek and meet the eastern terminus of SR 252 (Burnt Fort Road) at the hamlet of White Oak just south of White Oak Creek. The highways cross Waverly Creek then diverge in Waverly. US 17/SR 25 curves east and enters Glynn County by crossing the Little Satilla River at Spring Bluff. The concurrency curves north and within a suburban area has a four-way intersection with US 82/SR 520 (South Georgia Parkway) and the southern terminus of SR 303 (Blythe Island Highway). US 17/SR 25 turns east onto four-lane divided South Georgia Parkway, here also known as Jekyll Island Road, to travel concurrently with US 82/SR 520. The concurrency with US 82 ends at that highway's eastern terminus at a partial cloverleaf interchange with I-95. US 17 and SR 520 cross Fancy Bluff Creek onto Colonels Island and the highway becomes undivided at its crossing of the Golden Isles Terminal Railroad between a pair of automobile import and export marine terminals (Colonel's Island Terminal, Georgia Ports Authority). The highway becomes divided again shortly before SR 520 splits east as Downing Musgrove Causeway toward Jekyll Island as US 17/SR 25 curves north to cross the Brunswick River on the cable-stayed Sidney Lanier Bridge into the city of Brunswick.

=== Brunswick to Richmond Hill ===
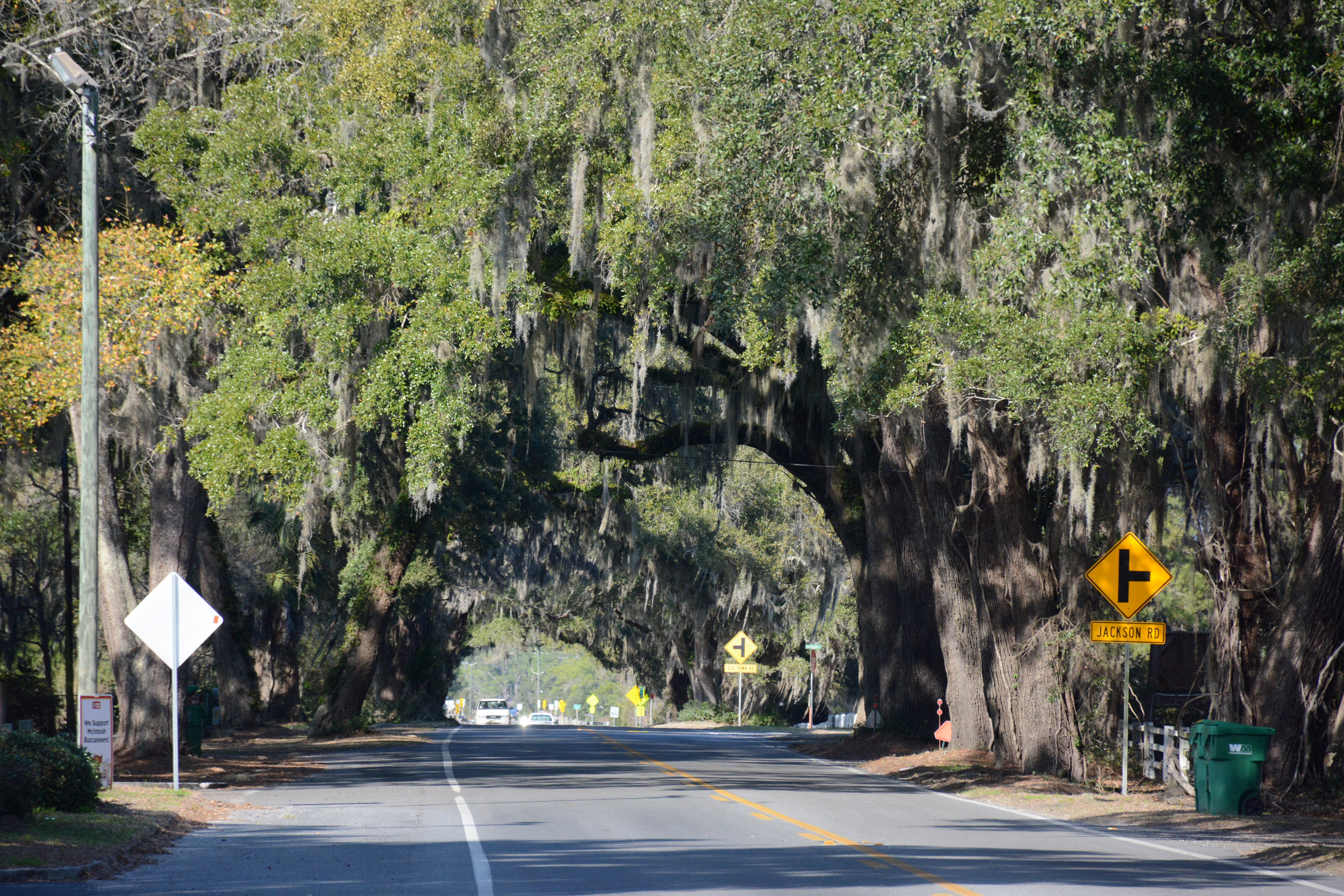
A canopy of oak trees over a section of US 17/SR 25 in McIntosh County

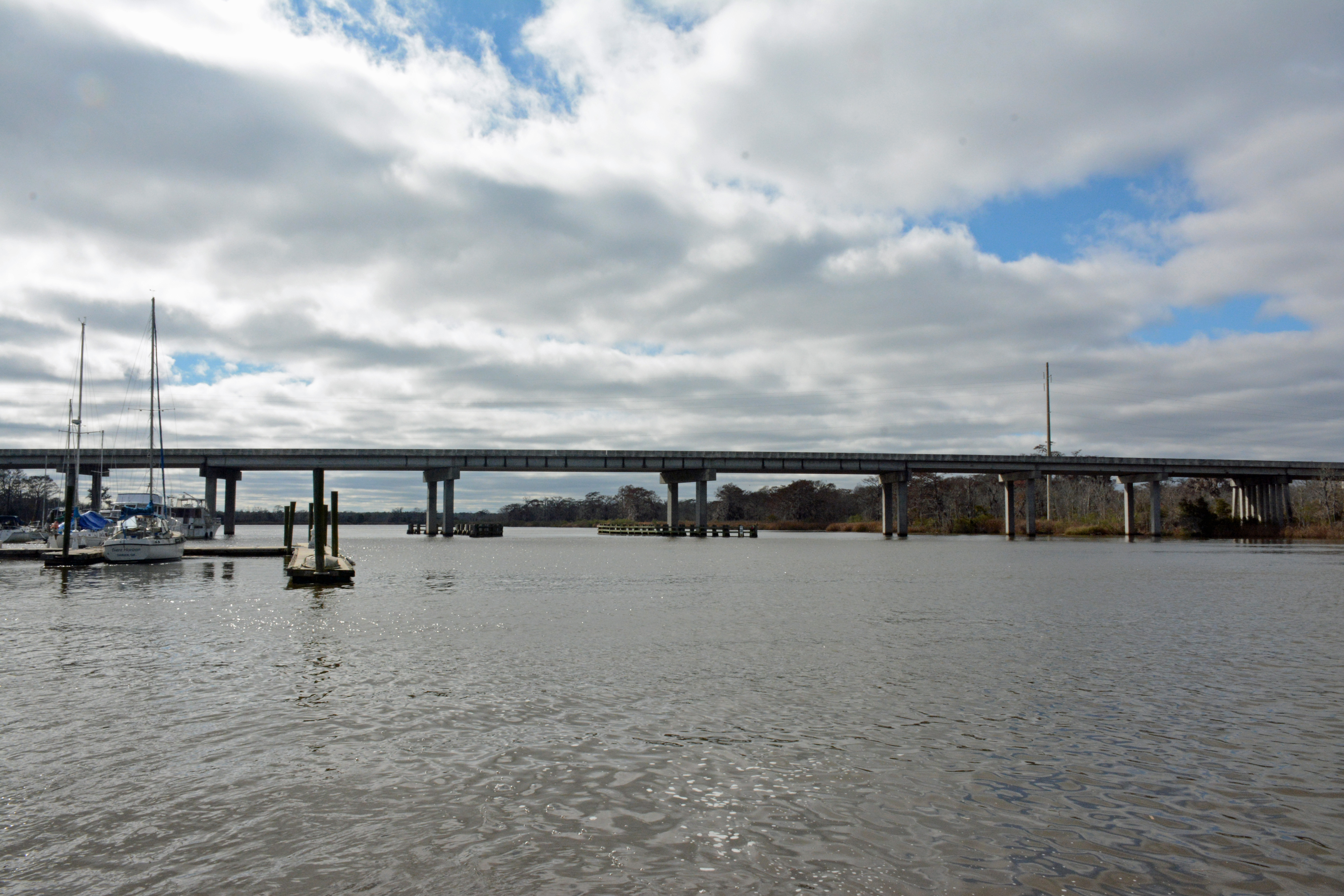
US 17/SR 25 bridge over the Altamaha River

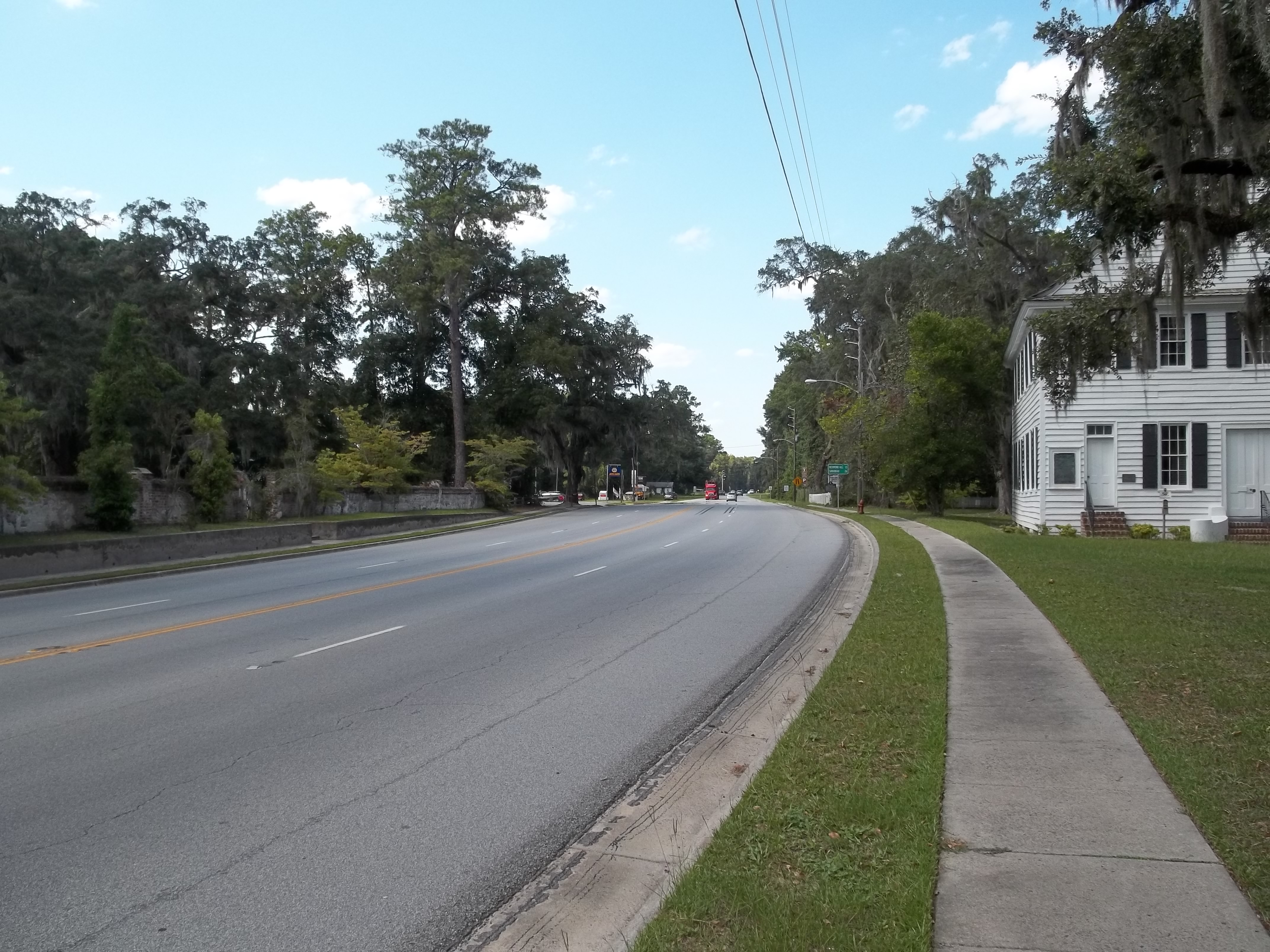
US 17/SR 25 through Midway, with the 1792 Midway Congregational Church on the right, and the even older Midway Cemetery on the left

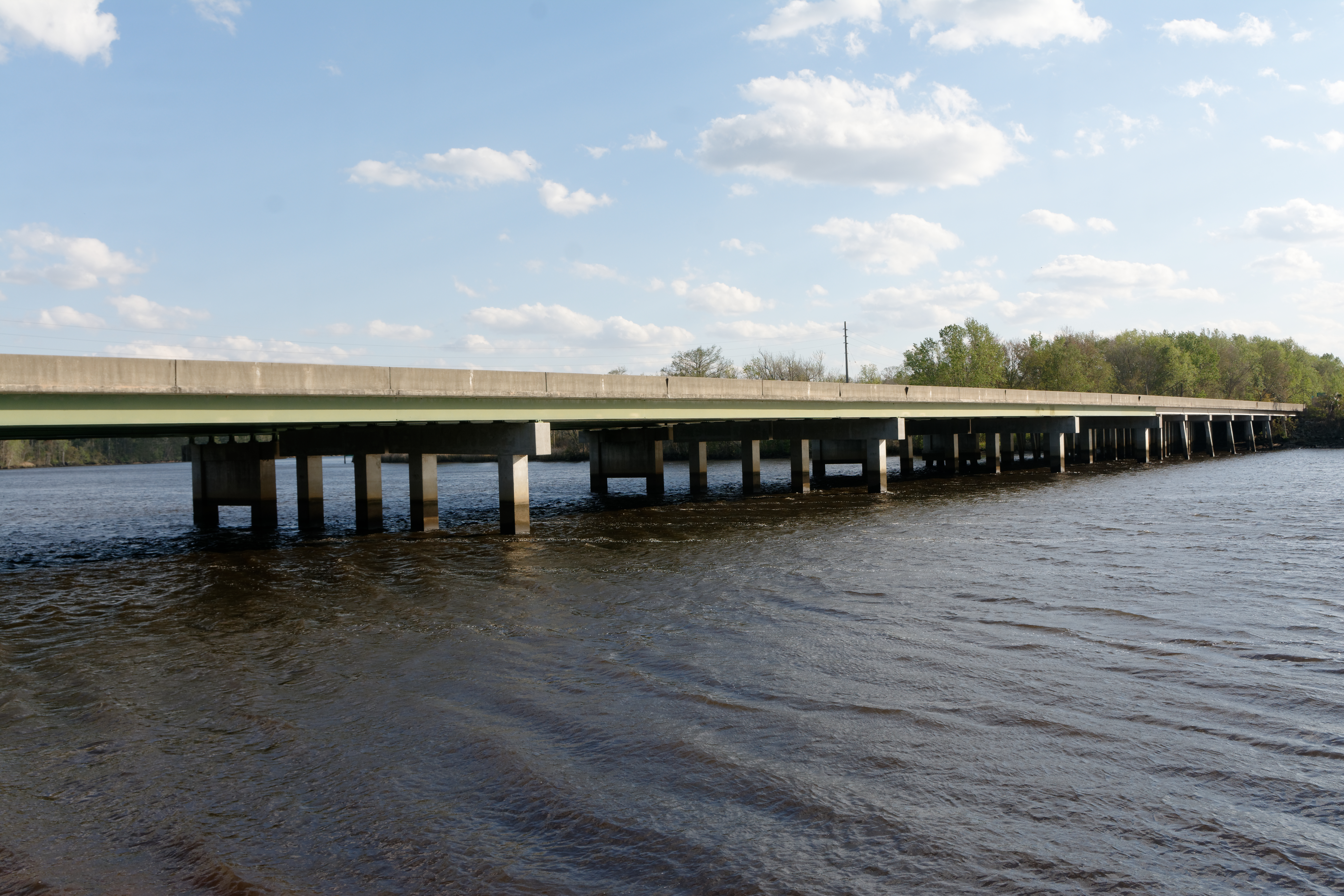
Crossing of US 17/SR 25 over the Ogeechee River

US 17/SR 25 heads along the eastern edge of Brunswick as Glynn Avenue, a controlled-access four-lane divided highway that has intersections with the southern terminus of US 341/SR 27 (4th Avenue) and US 25/SR 25 Conn. (Gloucester Street). The highways gain a third lane southbound at US 25/SR 25 Conn. and a third lane northbound at the F.J. Torras Causeway to St. Simons Island, which is unsigned as SR 25 Spur E. US 17/SR 25 crosses Cypress Mill Creek and leaves the city limits just south of its directional intersection with the southern terminus of SR 25 Spur (Golden Isles Parkway), which connects US 17/SR 25 with I-95. There is no direct access from southbound SR 25 Spur to northbound US 17/SR 25; that movement is made via an intersection with the northern terminus of SR 303 (Cypress Mill Road). US 17/SR 25 continues north with four lanes through a suburban area north of Brunswick. US 17/SR 25 reduces to two lanes just north of Chapel Crossing Road to the east of the Federal Law Enforcement Training Center. The highways re-enter a rural area as they travel to the east of Brunswick Golden Isles Airport. US 17/SR 25 begins to travel concurrently with I-95 Bus./SR 99 and travels along the edge of the Hofwyl-Broadfield Plantation Historic Site before crossing the South Altamaha River into McIntosh County.

I-95 Bus., US 17, SR 25, and SR 99 travel through the Altamaha Waterfowl Management Area, during which the highways traverse Champney Island, Butler Island, and Generals Island. The highways cross between the islands by crossing the Champney River and the Butler River, which are branches of the Altamaha River, and the Darien River, where the highways enter the city of Darien, the county seat of McIntosh County, as Walton Street. In the center of town, SR 99 splits east onto Adams Street and I-95 Bus./US 17/SR 25 continues as North Way, which is a four-lane undivided street in the city. North of the city limits, I-95 Bus. splits west along SR 251 and US 17/SR 25 reduces to two lanes and passes Eden Field Airport. US 17/SR 25 crosses a pair of swamps around the hamlet of Ardick and intersects SR 99 (Ridge Road) again at Eulonia. The highways cross the Sapelo River and Buck Hill Swamp on its way to its crossing of the South Newport River at South Newport.

US 17/SR 25 continues north through Liberty County and meets I-95 at a diamond interchange. The highway enters the sparsely populated city of Riceboro at Payne Creek. US 17/SR 25 temporarily expands to four lanes between its crossing of the Riceboro Southern Railway, which is part of the former Seaboard Air Line corridor, and its intersection with the eastern terminus of SR 119 (E.B. Cooper Highway). At the north end of the city, the highways cross Riceboro Creek. US 17/SR 25 crosses Peacock Creek and enters the city of Midway at Porter Creek. US 17/SR 25 intersects US 84/SR 38 (Oglethorpe Highway) in the center of the city. The highways expand to a four-lane divided highway at its intersection with SR 196 (Leroy Coffer Highway) just before crossing Mount Hope Creek, a tributary of the Jerico River, at the Liberty–Bryan county line. US 17/SR 25 enters a suburban area and parallels the city limits of Richmond Hill, which is immediately to the west, until the highway enters the city proper just before its partial cloverleaf interchange with I-95. US 17/SR 25 crosses over CSX's Nahunta Subdivision and intersects SR 144 (Ford Avenue) before leaving the city and entering Chatham County by crossing the Ogeechee River at Kings Ferry.

=== Richmond Hill to Port Wentworth ===
US 17/SR 25 continues northeast as Ogeechee Road through a suburban area. The highways meet SR 204 (Abercorn Expressway) at a diamond interchange in the suburb of Georgetown then crosses the Little Ogeechee River. US 17/SR 25 meets the southern terminus of SR 307 (Dean Forest Road) just west of Salt Creek, then continues east as a five-lane road with center turn lane. The highways cross over CSX's Nahunta Subdivision before reaching I-516/SR 21 (W.F. Lynes Parkway) at a diamond interchange at the city limits of Savannah. Ogeechee Road continues toward downtown Savannah as US 80/SR 26. I-516/US 17/US 80/SR 21/SR 25/SR 26 and I-516's unsigned companion designation of SR 421 head north-northeast from the interchange as a four-lane freeway. The freeway has a partial interchange with Tremont Street (southbound exit, northbound entrance), which serves the Savannah Amtrak station, and crosses CSX's Savannah Subdivision before its interchange with I-16 (Jim Gillis Historic Savannah Parkway). US 17 splits off to the east-southeast on six-lane I-16 while US 80, SR 21, SR 25, and SR 26 continue to the north-northeast concurrent with I-516. Almost immediately is another partial interchange with Gwinnett Street, which also serves the Amtrak station. Approximately 0.5 miles (0.80 km) later, they have a partial interchange with Augusta Avenue. This is the southern terminus of SR 25 Conn.; also, US 80 and SR 26 depart the concurrency. Immediately after is a partial interchange with West Lathrop Avenue, which serves the Georgia Ports Authority's Ocean Terminal. The highways curve to the northwest. They pass the Mary Calder Golf Course before an interchange with the northern terminus of SR 26 Conn. (Burnsed Boulevard). Here, SR 25 splits off to the northeast on Burnsed Boulevard. At an intersection with Main Street, where Burnsed Boulevard reaches its northern terminus, SR 25 turns left onto Main Street and travels to the north-northwest. Immediately, it crosses over Dundee Canal. The highway intersects SR 21 Spur (Brampton Road). Right after a crossing of Pipe Makers Canal, SR 25 meets the eastern terminus of SR 307 (Bourne Avenue). The highway then enters Port Wentworth. It passes Port Wentworth Elementary School before curving to the west-northwest. It passes the Port Wentworth City Hall and curves back to the north-northwest. The highway then intersects the eastern terminus of SR 30 (Bonny Bridge Road) and then curves to the northeast. It parallels Saint Augustine Creek before curving to the east-northeast. It crosses over the Savannah River on the James P. Houlihan Memorial Bridge and travels on Onslow Island. It crosses over the Middle River and travels on Argyle Island. The roadway then has a crossing over the Little Back River. Here, it enters South Carolina. This is the northern terminus of SR 25 and the southern terminus of South Carolina Highway 170.

== History ==
=== 1920s and 1930s ===
SR 25 was established at least as early as 1919 from Brunswick north-northeast to Darien and then north-northwest to Hinesville, where it intersected SR 38. At this same time, SR 27 was established on a westward curve from St. Marys to a point northwest of Brunswick, following parts of the current path of US 17/SR 25 in this area. Also, SR 30 was established from a point southeast of Clyde to Savannah. In addition, SR 26 was established in Savannah. By September 1921, the portion of SR 27 had its southern terminus shifted westward to Kingsland and was under construction from there to SR 50 northwest of Brunswick. The Darien–Hinesville segment of SR 25 was shifted eastward to travel from Darien to SR 30 southeast of Clyde. In addition, an unnumbered road was built from SR 21 north-northwest of Savannah east-northeast to the South Carolina state line. Before October 1926, SR 27 was truncated to north-northwest of Brunswick and then extended into the city; its former path was redesignated as part of SR 25, with US 17 designated on it. There was no indication if it connected to the Brunswick–Darien segment. SR 30 was truncated to the intersection with SR 25 southeast of Clyde, with SR 25 replacing it to Savannah. US 17 was designated on the Brunswick–Savannah segment. US 17 and SR 25 were extended north-northwest from Savannah to the previously-unnumbered road and then east-northeast to the South Carolina state line.

Between November 1930 and January 1932, US 280 was established on SR 26 in Savannah; however, there was no indication of a concurrency with US 17/SR 25. In the last quarter of 1937, US 80 was extended on US 280/SR 26 from Blitchton to Tybee Island, thus beginning its concurrency with US 17/SR 25 in Savannah. The January 1938 GDOT map is the first one that had an inset map of Savannah. It indicated that US 17/SR 25 entered the southern part of the city on Victory Drive. At Montgomery Street, they turned left and traveled to the north-northeast. At 37th Street, they began the concurrency with US 80/SR 26. At Liberty Street, US 80/SR 26 split off onto US 280, which ended here at the time. At Bay Street, US 17/SR 25 turned left onto SR 21, which ended at this intersection at the time. By September of the next year, US 80 was indicated to have been re-truncated to Blitchton.

=== 1940s and 1950s ===
In 1942, US 80 was indicated to be extended again, but possibly only as far east as the Bloomingdale area, if not all the way to Savannah. US 280 was truncated to Blitchton. Between January 1945 and November 1946, US 17/SR 25 were indicated to enter Savannah on Ogeechee Road. They turned right onto 37th Street. At Montgomery Street, they turned left onto US 80/SR 26. The four highways traveled to the north-northeast. At Bay Street, they turned left onto SR 21. US 80/SR 26 split off toward Pooler, and US 17/SR 21/SR 25 entered Industrial City Gardens, the name of Garden City at the time. By February 1948, US 17/SR 25 were indicated to have entered Savannah on Ogeechee Road. They turned right onto 52nd Street and traveled to the east-southeast. They turned left onto Whatley Avenue and traveled to the east-northeast. At Montgomery Street, they turned left and resumed their previous routing. Later that year, SR 50 was extended from a point west of Brunswick to Jekyll Island, thus forming what is the current southern bypass of US 17/SR 25 around the main part of Brunswick.

By August 1950, US 17/SR 25 was indicated to have been reverted to their 1938 routing in Savannah, on Ogeechee Road, 37th Street, Montgomery Street, and Bay Street. Their former path on 52nd Street, Whatley Avenue, and the southern part of Montgomery Street was redesignated as SR 25 Spur. In 1953, US 84 was extended on SR 50 from a point west of Brunswick to a point south of the city, if not all the way to Jekyll Island. At this time, the path of SR 25 Spur in Savannah was utilized as the northbound lanes of US 17/SR 25, while US 17/SR 25 southbound used the previous routing. Between June 1954 and June 1955, the northbound lanes of US 17/SR 25 (which were also the westbound lanes of US 80/SR 26) in the main part of Savannah continued to use Montgomery Street, while southbound US 17/SR 25 (eastbound US 80/SR 26) used West Broad Street. By July 1957, US 17/SR 25 were relocated onto the southern and eastern bypass of the main part of Brunswick, and thus a concurrency with US 84/SR 50 for part of this portion. Their former alignment was partially redesignated as SR 303.

=== 1960s to 2000s ===
The 1966 GDOT map was the first one to feature an inset of Brunswick. The concurrency with US 84 was indicated to begin at the current western end of the US 82 concurrency near Brunswick and continued to the US 341/SR 27 intersection in the city, where US 84 joined that concurrency. In Savannah, SR 26 Loop, the predecessor of I-516, was proposed on basically I-516's current path. In 1966, the portion of SR 26 Loop used for US 17/SR 25 was indicated to have been under construction from Ogeechee Road to Augusta Avenue. The short portion past Augusta Avenue was not built at the time. The next year, the portion of SR 26 Loop from I-16 to Augusta Avenue was still under construction, while the portion from Ogeechee Road to I-16 was indicated to be "OPEN SPRING '68". In 1968, this portion was opened. The next year, the portion from I-16 to Augusta Avenue was opened. Also, SR 25 Spur in Savannah was redesignated as SR 26 Conn.

In 1970, SR 26 Loop was proposed to be extended past Augusta Avenue, north-northeast to Bay Street (east-southeast of Augusta Avenue), then on a northern curve to Bay Street again (between Augusta Avenue and Fair Street). In 1977, SR 26 Loop was decommissioned, with SR 21 routed on its former path. The westward extension of this highway was opened.

Between January 1984 and January 1986, I-516 was designated on SR 26 Loop's former path (SR 21). Also, US 17/US 80/SR 25/SR 26 was shifted onto I-516/SR 21. Part of the former path, on Broad Street and Bay Street, was redesignated as part of US 17 Alt./SR 25 Alt. Also, SR 26 Conn. in Savannah was decommissioned. In 1988, SR 50 was truncated out of the Brunswick area, mostly replaced by SR 520. The next year, the paths of US 82 and US 84 east of Waycross were swapped. The southern highway, now US 82, was also truncated to the I-95 interchange near Brunswick.

In 1995, the path of US 17 between Savannah and Hardeeville, South Carolina was shifted to the southeast, onto I-16 and SR 404 Spur, thus replacing US 17 Alt./SR 25 Alt. The portion of US 17 in South Carolina was replaced by a westward extension of SC 170.

In 2001, the unsigned companion designation SR 421 was designated on I-516.

== Major intersections ==
| County | Location | mi | km | Exit | Destinations | Notes |
|---|---|---|---|---|---|---|
| St. Marys River | | 0.000 | 0.000 | | US 17 south (SR 5 south) – Jacksonville | Southern terminus; southern end of US 17 concurrency; continuation into Florida as SR 5 |
| Camden | Kingsland | 4.056 | 6.527 | | SR 40 (King Avenue) to I-95 – St. Marys, Colerain | |
| Camden | | 7.039 | 11.328 | | Harrietts Bluff Road east to I-95 | Western terminus of Harrietts Bluff Road |
| Camden | Woodbine | 15.238 | 24.523 | | SR 25 Spur east (10th Street) to I-95 | Western terminus of SR 25 Spur |
| Camden | Woodbine | 15.783 | 25.400 | | SR 110 west (4th Street) – Folkston, Camden County Courthouse | Southern end of SR 110 concurrency (SR 110 unsigned for length of concurrency) |
| Camden | Satilla River | 16.292 | 26.219 | | J. Edwin "Fat" Godley Memorial Bridge | |
| Camden | White Oak | 20.232 | 32.560 | | SR 252 west (Burnt Fort Road) – Folkston | Eastern terminus of SR 252 |
| Camden | Waverly | 24.551 | 39.511 | | SR 110 west / Horse Stamp Church Road east – Atkinson | Northern end of SR 110 concurrency; western terminus of Horse Stamp Church Road |
| Little Satilla River | | 31.640 | 50.920 | | C.L. McCarthy Sr. Memorial Bridge | |
| Glynn | | 34.281 | 55.170 | | US 82 west / SR 520 west (Corridor Z) / SR 303 north (Blythe Island Highway) – Waynesville, Waycross | Western end of US 82 and SR 520 concurrencies; southern terminus of SR 303 |
| Glynn | | 34.922 | 56.202 | | I-95 (SR 405) / US 82 ends – Jacksonville, Savannah | Eastern end of US 82 concurrency; eastern terminus of US 82; I-95 exit 29; Corporal Michael Douglas Young Memorial Interchange |
| Glynn | Fancy Bluff Creek | 36.407 | 58.591 | | Edward A. Logan Memorial Bridge | |
| Glynn | | 40.359 | 64.952 | | SR 520 east – Jekyll Island | Eastern end of SR 520 concurrency |
| Glynn | Brunswick River | 41.262 | 66.405 | | Sidney Lanier Bridge | |
| Glynn | Brunswick | 42.653 | 68.643 | | US 341 north (Fourth Avenue / SR 27 north) – Port of Brunswick | Southern terminus of US 341/SR 27 |
| Glynn | Brunswick | 43.946 | 70.724 | | US 25 north / SR 25 Conn. north (Gloucester Street) – Jesup | Southern terminus of US 25/SR 25 Conn. |
| Glynn | Brunswick | 44.541 | 71.682 | | SR 25 Spur east (F.J. Torras Causeway) / Stacy Street north – St. Simons Island, Sea Island, Fort Frederica | Western terminus of unsigned SR 25 Spur E (F.J. Torras Causeway); southern terminus of Stacy Street |
| Glynn | Brunswick | 46.172 | 74.307 | | SR 25 Spur north (Golden Isles Parkway) to I-95 – Federal Law Enforcement Training Centers, Brunswick Golden Isles Airport | Southern terminus of SR 25 Spur; no direct access from SR 25 Spur to northbound US 17/SR 25 |
| Glynn | Brunswick | 46.701 | 75.158 | | SR 303 south (Cypress Mill Road) | Northern terminus of SR 303 |
| Glynn | | 55.493 | 89.307 | | I-95 BL south / SR 99 south to I-95 – Sterling | Southern end of I-95 Bus. and SR 99 concurrencies |
| Altamaha River | | 57.200 | 92.054 | | Harold James Friedman Memorial Bridge | |
| McIntosh | Darien | 60.386 | 97.182 | | SR 99 north (Adams Street) – Ridgeville, Fort King George, Sapelo Island | Northern end of SR 99 concurrency |
| McIntosh | Darien | 61.481 | 98.944 | | I-95 BL north / SR 251 north to I-95 – Savannah, Townsend | Northern end of I-95 Bus. concurrency; southern terminus of SR 251 |
| McIntosh | Eulonia | 71.507 | 115.079 | | SR 99 (Ridge Road) to I-95 / SR 57 – Crescent, Ludowici, Sapelo Island | |
| Liberty | | 80.841 | 130.101 | | I-95 (SR 405) – Jacksonville, Savannah | I-95 exit 67 |
| Liberty | Riceboro | 87.779 | 141.267 | | SR 119 north (E.B. Cooper Highway) – Walthourville | Southern terminus of SR 119 |
| Liberty | Midway | 92.054 | 148.147 | | US 84 / SR 38 (Oglethorpe Highway) to I-95 – Hinesville, Ft. Stewart, Fort Morris, Dorchester Academy | |
| Liberty | | 98.169 | 157.988 | | SR 196 west (Leroy Coffer Highway) – Hinesville | Eastern terminus of SR 196 |
| Bryan | Richmond Hill | 103.228 | 166.129 | | I-95 (SR 405) to I-16 – Brunswick, Savannah | I-95 exit 87 |
| Bryan | Richmond Hill | 105.144 | 169.213 | | SR 144 (Ford Avenue) to I-95 – Keller, Fort McAllister Historic Park | |
| Ogeechee River | | 107.491 | 172.990 | | Harvey Granger Bridge | |
| Chatham | Georgetown | 110.493 | 177.821 | | SR 204 (Abercorn Street) to I-95 – Pembroke, Savannah, Wormsloe State Historic Site, Skidaway Island State Park, Hunter Army Airfield, Savannah Intl. | |
| Chatham | Garden City | 114.222 | 183.822 | | SR 307 north (Dean Forest Road) – Garden City, Port Wentworth | Southern terminus of SR 307 |
| Chatham | Savannah | 116.777 | 187.934 | | Chatham Parkway to I-16 – Veterans Parkway | |
| Chatham | Savannah | 118.231 | 190.274 | 3 | I-516 east / US 80 east (SR 26 east) / SR 21 south (W.F. Lynes Parkway / SR 421 south) to I-16 – Savannah Tech, Hunter Army Airfield, VA Clinic | Southern end of I-516/US 80/SR 21/SR 26/SR 421 concurrency; southern end of freeway section; exit numbers follow I-516 |
| Chatham | Savannah | 119.027 | 191.555 | 4 | Tremont Avenue – Amtrak Station | Southbound exit and northbound entrance |
| Chatham | Savannah | 119.446 | 192.230 | 5 | I-16 (Jim L. Gillis Historic Savannah Parkway / SR 404) / US 17 north – Macon, Savannah, Savannah Int'l. | Northern end of US 17 concurrency; I-16/SR 404 exits 164A-B |
| Chatham | Savannah | 120.103 | 193.287 | 6 | Gwinnett Street – Amtrak Station | Northbound exit and southbound entrance |
| Chatham | Savannah | 120.784 | 194.383 | 7A | US 80 west / SR 25 Conn. north (Augusta Avenue / SR 26 west) | Northern end of US 80/SR 26 concurrency; northbound exit and southbound entrance; southern terminus of SR 25 Conn.; signed "To Bay Street" |
| Chatham | Savannah | 121.012 | 194.750 | 7B | West Lathrop Avenue – Georgia Ports Authority Ocean Terminal | Southbound exit (exit 7) is for "SR 25 Conn. (Bay Street) – Downtown". |
| Chatham | Garden City | 122.009 | 196.354 | 8 | I-516 west (W.F. Lynes Parkway / SR 421 north) / SR 21 north / Burnsed Boulevard south (SR 26 Conn. south) – Garden City | Northern end of I-516/SR 21/SR 421 concurrency; northern terminus of SR 26 Conn.; southbound exit signed "TO US 80 (Bay Street) – Garden City" |
| Chatham | Garden City | 122.109 | 196.515 | | Main Street south to US 80 (SR 26) | |
| Chatham | Garden City | 122.699 | 197.465 | | SR 21 Spur (Brampton Road) | |
| Chatham | Garden City | 124.069 | 199.670 | | SR 307 west (Bourne Avenue) – Georgia Ports Authority | Eastern terminus of SR 307 |
| Chatham | Port Wentworth | 126.319 | 203.291 | | SR 30 west (Bonny Bridge Road) – Springfield, Savannah Intl. | Eastern terminus of SR 30 |
| Back River | | 128.770 | 207.235 | | SC 170 north – Limehouse | Northern terminus; continuation into South Carolina as SC 170 |
1.000 mi = 1.609 km; 1.000 km = 0.621 mi: Concurrency terminus; Incomplete access

== Special routes ==
=== Woodbine spur route ===
State Route 25 Spur
- Location: Woodbine
- Length: 2.79 mi (4.49 km)
- Existed: 1977–present

State Route 25 Spur (SR 25 Spur) is a 2.79-mile-long (4.49 km) spur route of SR 25 that exists almost entirely within the city limits of Woodbine. It begins at an intersection with US 17/SR 25 (Bedell Avenue) in the central part of the city. It travels to the east-northeast on 10th Street. An intersection with Georgia Avenue leads to the University of Georgia Extension Office. It then curves to the east-southeast. Just before an intersection with the southern terminus of Pine Forest Drive, which leads to Woodbine Elementary School, it curves to the southeast. After a curve back to the east-southeast, it meets its eastern terminus, an interchange with Interstate 95 (I-95) just southeast of the city. Here, the roadway continues as Lang Lane, a gravel road.

In 1977, it was established on its current path.

The entire route is in Camden County.

| Location | mi | km | Destinations | Notes |
|---|---|---|---|---|
| Woodbine | 0.00 | 0.00 | US 17 / SR 25 (Bedell Avenue) | Western terminus |
| | 2.79 | 4.49 | I-95 (SR 405) / Lang Lane east – Jacksonville, Savannah | Eastern terminus; I-95 exit 14; roadway continues as Lang Lane. |
1.000 mi = 1.609 km; 1.000 km = 0.621 mi

=== Brunswick spur route (1949–1960) ===
State Route 25 Spur
- Location: Brunswick
- Existed: 1949–1960

State Route 25 Spur (SR 25 Spur) was a spur route of SR 25 that mostly existed in Brunswick. Between February 1948 and April 1949, it was established from SR 50 south-southeast of the city to US 17/SR 25 east of it. Between July 1957 and June 1960, the path of US 17/SR 25 in the Brunswick metropolitan area was shifted southeastward; they and an eastern extended US 84 replaced the path of SR 25 Spur.

The entire route was in Glynn County.

| Location | mi | km | Destinations | Notes |
|---|---|---|---|---|
| | | | SR 50 | Southern terminus |
| Brunswick | | | US 17 / SR 25 | Northern terminus |
1.000 mi = 1.609 km; 1.000 km = 0.621 mi

=== Brunswick connector route ===
State Route 25 Connector
- Location: Brunswick
- Length: 1.120 mi (1.802 km)
- Existed: 1965–present

State Route 25 Connector (SR 25 Conn.) is a 1.120-mile-long (1.802 km) connector route of SR 25 that exists entirely within the city limits of Brunswick. It begins at an intersection with US 17/SR 25 (Glynn Avenue). It travels west-southwest on Gloucester Street, concurrent with US 25, and skirts along the northern edge of Howard Coffin Park. Starting at Martin Luther King Jr. Boulevard, they travel through the Old Town Brunswick Historic District. At an intersection with US 341/SR 27 (Bay Street), SR 25 Conn. ends, US 25 turns right onto US 341/SR 27, and Gloucester Street continues past this intersection.

The entire length of SR 25 Conn. is part of the National Highway System, a system of routes determined to be the most important for the nation's economy, mobility, and defense.

Between June 1963 and the beginning of 1966, SR 25 Conn. was established on its current path.

The entire route is in Brunswick, Glynn County.

| mi | km | Destinations | Notes |
|---|---|---|---|
| 0.000 | 0.000 | US 17 / SR 25 (Glynn Avenue) / US 25 begins – Jekyll Island, Woodbine, Jacksonville, St. Simons, Darien, Savannah | Eastern terminus; eastern end of US 25 concurrency; southern terminus of US 25 |
| 1.120 | 1.802 | US 25 north / US 341 / SR 27 (Bay Street) – Jesup | Western terminus; western end of US 25 concurrency; roadway continues as Gloucester Street. |
1.000 mi = 1.609 km; 1.000 km = 0.621 mi: Concurrency terminus

=== Brunswick east spur route ===
State Route 25 Spur
- Location: Brunswick–St. Simons Island
- Length: 4.13 mi (6.65 km)
- Existed: 2004–present

State Route 25 Spur (SR 25 Spur) is a 4.13-mile-long (6.65 km) spur route of SR 25 that exists in Brunswick and St. Simons Island. It is known as F.J. Torras Causeway for its entire length. It begins at an intersection with US 17/SR 25 (Glynn Avenue) and the southern terminus of Stacy Street in the eastern part of Brunswick. It travels to the east-northeast and crosses over Fancy Bluff Creek. It curves to the northeast and crosses over the Back River, leaving Brunswick. The spur crosses over the Little River and curves to the east-southeast. They cross over the Mackay River and the Intracoastal Waterway. While traveling over Lanier Island, it curves to the southeast. It crosses over the Frederica River and then enters St. Simons Island. Almost immediately, it reaches its eastern terminus, a triangular traffic circle with Kings Way, Demere Road, and Sea Island Road.

The entire length of SR 25 Spur is part of the National Highway System, a system of routes determined to be the most important for the nation's economy, mobility, and defense.

Between September 1953 and June 1954, an unnumbered road was established on its current path. About 50 years later, SR 25 Spur was designated on this road.

The entire route is in Glynn County.

| Location | mi | km | Destinations | Notes |
|---|---|---|---|---|
| Brunswick | 0.00 | 0.00 | US 17 / SR 25 (Glynn Avenue) / Stacy Street north – Hofwyl-Broadfield Plantation State Historic Site | Western terminus of SR 25 Spur; southern terminus of Stacy Street |
| St. Simons Island | 4.13 | 6.65 | Kings Way south / Demere Road east / Sea Island Road north | Eastern terminus of SR 25 Spur; northern terminus of Kings Way; western terminus of Demere Road; southern terminus of Sea Island Road; triangular traffic circle |
1.000 mi = 1.609 km; 1.000 km = 0.621 mi

=== Brunswick spur route ===
State Route 25 Spur
- Location: Brunswick
- Length: 7.44 mi (11.97 km)
- Existed: 1974–present

State Route 25 Spur (SR 25 Spur) is a 7.44-mile-long (11.97 km) spur route of SR 25 that partially exists in the northern part of Brunswick. It is known as Golden Isles Parkway (signed as "Golden Isles Veterans Memorial Parkway") for its entire length. It begins at an intersection with US 17/SR 25 (Darien Highway). There is no access from SR 25 Spur to northbound US 17/SR 25. The highway travels to the north-northwest. At an intersection with SR 303 (Cypress Mill Road), it briefly leaves the city limits of Brunswick and enters Country Club Estates. After it re-enters Brunswick, it intersects Altama Avenue. Here, the spur route leaves the city limits of Brunswick and begins to skirt along the eastern edge of the city limits of Dock Junction for the rest of its length. Between Altama Connector and Scranton Road, it passes just to the west of the Glynn Place Mall. An intersection with the western terminus of Glynco Parkway leads to Brunswick Golden Isles Airport, Brunswick Job Corps, Georgia Air National Guard, and Coastal Pines Technical College. It has an interchange with Interstate 95 (I-95). Then SR 25 Spur meets an intersection with SR 99. From here, SR 25 Spur ends, and Golden Isles Parkway continues to the north.

The entire length of SR 25 Spur is part of the National Highway System, a system of routes determined to be the most important for the nation's economy, mobility, and defense.

In 1971, SR 25 Spur was proposed on its current path. In 1974, it was completed.

The entire route is in Glynn County.

| Location | mi | km | Destinations | Notes |
|---|---|---|---|---|
| Brunswick | 0.00 | 0.00 | US 17 south / SR 25 south (Darien Highway) | No access from SR 25 Spur to northbound US 17/SR 25; southern terminus |
| Brunswick–Country Club Estates line | 0.73 | 1.17 | SR 303 (Cypress Mill Road) to US 17 north (SR 25 north) | |
| Dock Junction | 4.43 | 7.13 | I-95 (SR 405) – Jacksonville, Savannah | I-95 exit 38 |
| | 7.44 | 11.97 | SR 99 (Grants Ferry Road) / Golden Isles Parkway north | Northern terminus; roadway continues as Golden Isles Parkway. |
1.000 mi = 1.609 km; 1.000 km = 0.621 mi: Incomplete access

=== Darien spur route ===
State Route 25 Spur
- Location: Darien
- Existed: 1946–2002

State Route 25 Spur (SR 25 Spur) was a spur route of SR 25 that partially existed in Darien. Between January 1945 and November 1946, it was established from US 17/SR 25 in Darien to Fort King George, east of the city. In 2002, this spur route was decommissioned.

The entire route was in McIntosh County.

| Location | mi | km | Destinations | Notes |
|---|---|---|---|---|
| Darien | | | US 17 / SR 25 | Western terminus |
| | | | Fort King George | Eastern terminus |
1.000 mi = 1.609 km; 1.000 km = 0.621 mi

=== Savannah spur route (1948–1969) ===
State Route 25 Spur
- Location: Savannah
- Existed: 1948–1969

State Route 25 Spur (SR 25 Spur) was a spur route of SR 25 that existed in Savannah. Between November 1946 and February 1948, it was established from US 17/SR 25 on the western edge of the city to US 17/US 80/SR 25/SR 26 in the main part of it. Between April 1949 and August 1950, it was then indicated to have started at US 17/SR 25 (Ogeechee Road), traveled east-southeast on 52nd Street, turned left on Whatley Avenue and traveled to the northeast, curved to the north-northeast onto Montgomery Street and traveled north-northeast to its northern terminus. By the beginning of 1952, US 17 Alt. was established on the path of SR 25 Spur from US 17/SR 25 east-southeast on Mills B. Lane Boulevard, northeast on Whatley Avenue, and north-northeast on Montgomery Street, as previously. In 1953, the path of US 17 Alt. on SR 25 Spur was redesignated as the northbound lanes of US 17. In 1969, the path of SR 25 Spur, on US 17 north, was redesignated as SR 26 Conn.

The entire route was in Savannah, Chatham County.

| mi | km | Destinations | Notes |
|---|---|---|---|
| | | US 17 south / SR 25 / SR 26 Loop | Southern end of US 17 concurrency; southern terminus; interchange |
| | | US 17 north / US 80 / SR 25 / SR 26 (Victory Drive / West Broad Street / Montgomery Street) | Northern end of US 17 concurrency; northern terminus |
1.000 mi = 1.609 km; 1.000 km = 0.621 mi: Concurrency terminus

=== Savannah spur route (1966–1986) ===
State Route 25 Spur
- Location: Savannah
- Existed: 1966–1986

State Route 25 Spur (SR 25 Spur) was a spur route of SR 25 that existed in the northern part of Savannah. In 1966, it was established on West Lathrope Avenue from US 17/US 80/SR 25/SR 26 (Bay Street) northeast to the Georgia Ports Authority. In 1986, it was decommissioned.

The entire route was in Savannah, Chatham County.

| mi | km | Destinations | Notes |
|---|---|---|---|
| | | US 17 / US 80 / SR 25 / SR 26 (Bay Street) | Southern terminus |
| | | Georgia Ports Authority | Northern terminus |
1.000 mi = 1.609 km; 1.000 km = 0.621 mi

=== Savannah connector route ===
State Route 25 Connector
- Location: Savannah
- Length: 2.87 mi (4.62 km)
- Existed: 1991–present

State Route 25 Connector (SR 25 Conn.) is a 2.87-mile-long (4.62 km) connector route of SR 25 that exists entirely in the city limits of Savannah. It begins at a partial interchange with I-516/US 80/SR 21/SR 25/SR 26. There is no access from SR 25 Conn. to I-516 west/SR 21 north/SR 25 north/SR 26 west. US 80/SR 25 Conn./SR 26 travel northwest on Augusta Avenue. They turn right onto West Lathrop Avenue and travel to the north-northeast for one block. At Bay Street, US 80/SR 26 turns left to the west-northwest, while SR 25 Conn. turns right to the east-southeast. It has another partial interchange with I-516/SR 21/SR 25, with no access from SR 25 Conn. north to I-516/SR 21/SR 26 or from I-516/SR 21/SR 25 to SR 25 Conn. south. Between an intersection with the northern terminus of Jenks Street and the southern terminus of Cleland Street and an intersection with the southeastern terminus of Hudson Street, the connector route skirts along the northern edge of Bartow Park. East-southeast of an intersection with East Lathrop Avenue, it travels on the Dorothy Barnes Pelote Bridge, which crosses over some railroad tracks of Norfolk Southern Railway, travels under the Talmadge Memorial Bridge (carrying US 17/SR 404 Spur), and crosses over the Springfield Canal. Just east of this canal is a ramp from SR 25 Conn. (Bay Street) to Warner Street, which is a one-way street. At Martin Luther King Jr. Boulevard, it turns right and travels to the south-southwest. Within the first two blocks, it passes by the First African Baptist Church and the Ships of the Sea Maritime Museum and then turns right onto Oglethorpe Avenue. It travels to the west-northwest and passes the Chatham Area Transit bus station between Ann Street and Fahm Avenue. At West Boundary Street, it curves to the northwest. It has a second crossing over the Springfield Canal. A short distance later, the highway has a partial interchange with US 17 north/SR 404 Spur north (Talmadge Memorial Bridge). There is no access from SR 25 Conn. to southbound US 17/SR 404 Spur or from northbound US 17/SR 404 Spur to SR 25 Conn. At this interchange, the connector reaches its northern terminus.

Except for the Oglethorpe Avenue portion, the entire length of SR 25 Conn. is part of the National Highway System, a system of routes determined to be the most important for the nation's economy, mobility, and defense.

The 1938 GDOT map, which was the first one that had an inset map of Savannah, indicated that US 17/US 80/SR 25/SR 21/SR 26 traveled on Bay Street, from what is now Martin Luther King Jr. Boulevard to Lathrop Avenue. In 1978, SR 21 was shifted off of Bay Street, and onto what would eventually become I-516. In 1985, the path of US 17/US 80/SR 25/SR 26 was shifted southwestward, off of Bay Street and West Broad Street, and onto I-516/SR 21 north of the Ogeechee Road interchange. The path of US 17 Alt./SR 25 Alt. was shifted northward, off of Stiles Avenue, Gwinnett Street, and Boundary Street, and onto Bay Street, West Broad Street, York Street, and the Talmadge Memorial Bridge. In 1988, York Street was renamed as a western extension of Oglethorpe Avenue. In 1991, the path of US 17 Alt./SR 25 Alt. was shifted southeastward, off of Bay Street, West Broad Street, and Oglethorpe Avenue, and onto the proposed path of SR 404 Spur and the Talmadge Memorial Bridge. The former path was redesignated as SR 25 Conn. Nearly 25 years later, West Lathrop Avenue was extended south-southwest, to Augusta Avenue. US 80 and SR 25 Conn. were extended onto both avenues to I-516/SR 21/SR 25.

The entire route is in Savannah, Chatham County.

| mi | km | Destinations | Notes |
|---|---|---|---|
| 0.04 | 0.064 | I-516 east / US 80 east / SR 21 south / SR 25 south (W.F. Lynes Parkway / SR 26 east / SR 421 east) to I-16 (SR 404) | No access from SR 25 Conn. to I-516 west/SR 21 north/SR 25 north/SR 26 west; southern end of US 80/SR 26 concurrency; southern terminus; I-516 exit 7A (westbound on I-516); exit 7 (eastbound on I-516) |
| 0.25 | 0.40 | US 80 west (Bay Street / SR 26 west) – Garden City | Northern end of US 80/SR 26 concurrency |
| 0.33 | 0.53 | I-516 / SR 21 (W.F. Lynes Parkway / SR 25 / SR 421) | No access from SR 25 Conn. north to I-516/SR 21/SR 25 or from I-516/SR 21/SR 25 to SR 25 Conn. south |
| 1.63 | 2.62 | Dorothy Barnes Pelote Bridge | Crossing over Norfolk Southern Railway line and Springfield Canal |
| 2.04 | 3.28 | Warner Street north | No access from southbound Warner Street, a one-way street to SR 25 Conn.; partial interchange |
| 2.87 | 4.62 | US 17 north / SR 404 Spur north (Talmadge Memorial Bridge) | No access from SR 25 Conn. to southbound US 17/SR 404 Spur or from northbound US 17/SR 404 Spur to SR 25 Conn.; northern terminus; interchange |
1.000 mi = 1.609 km; 1.000 km = 0.621 mi: Concurrency terminus; Incomplete access
