= U.S. Route 17 in Georgia =

U.S. highway in Georgia

U.S. Highway 17
- Coastal Highway; Ocean Highway
- US 17 highlighted in red

Route information
- Maintained by GDOT
- Length: 123.93 mi (199.45 km)
- Existed: 1926–present
- History: SR 25 established at least as early as 1919
- Tourist routes: Altamaha Historic Scenic Byway

Major junctions
- South end: US 17 / SR 5 / SR 25 at the Florida state line south of Kingsland
- I-95 / US 82 / SR 520 west of Brunswick; US 341 / SR 27 in Brunswick; US 25 / SR 25 Conn. in Brunswick; I-95 BL / SR 251 in Darien; I-95 in Riceboro; US 84 / SR 38 in Midway; I-95 in Richmond Hill; I-16 / I-516 / US 80 / SR 21 / SR 25 / SR 26 in Savannah
- North end: US 17 and SR 404 Spur at the South Carolina state line in Savannah

Location
- Country: United States
- State: Georgia
- Counties: Camden, Glynn, McIntosh, Liberty, Bryan, Chatham

Highway system
- United States Numbered Highway System; List; Special; Divided; Georgia State Highway System; Interstate; US; State; Special
| ← SR 16S | → SR 17 |

U.S. Highway 17 (US 17) is a 123.93-mile-long (199.45 km) United States Numbered Highway in the U.S. state of Georgia. It travels south–north near the Atlantic Ocean, serving the Brunswick and Savannah metropolitan areas on its path from Florida at the St. Marys River to South Carolina at the Savannah River, and parallels I-95 as an alternative route to the interstate in Georgia. Except for part of the highway in Savannah, which is concurrent with Interstate 16 (I-16; internally designated as State Route 404, or SR 404) and SR 404 Spur to the Talmadge Memorial Bridge to Hutchinson Island, US 17 is concurrent with SR 25. SR 25 uses an older western alignment of US 17 into South Carolina.

US 17 formerly traveled on part of what is now SR 303 west of Brunswick and US 25/US 341/SR 27 in the city. A portion of US 17 in Savannah was formerly US 17 Alternate (US 17 Alt.). US 17/SR 25, as well as US 80/SR 26 in Savannah utilized portions of Montgomery Street, West Broad Street (now known as Martin Luther King Jr. Boulevard), and Bay Street, through the central part of the city. The portion of US 17 concurrent with I-16 and SR 404 Spur (on the Talmadge Memorial Bridge) were formerly part of US 17 Alt.

== Route description ==
All of US 17 in Georgia that does not have a local street name is known as Ocean Highway (alternatively spelled "Ocean Hiway"), which was the name of an auto trail established in 1935 connecting Jacksonville, Florida, with New York, New York. The Georgia General Assembly made the Ocean Hiway designation official in a 1958 resolution that recognized the concerted advertising effort of the Ocean Hiway Association, its impact on tourism, and the signage of the highway in the coastal states to the north. SR 25 travels concurrently with US 17 for almost its entire length in the state. The highways split at the I-16/I-516 interchange in Savannah; US 17 follows I-16 and its unsigned companion SR 404 and then SR 404 Spur to the South Carolina state line at the Savannah River, while SR 25 heads northwest along the old route of US 17 to Port Wentworth to cross the river upstream from the city. US 17 is a part of the National Highway System from US 82/SR 303/SR 520 west of Brunswick to SR 25 Spur in Brunswick and from just southwest of Richmond Hill to the South Carolina state line.

=== Kingsland to Brunswick ===
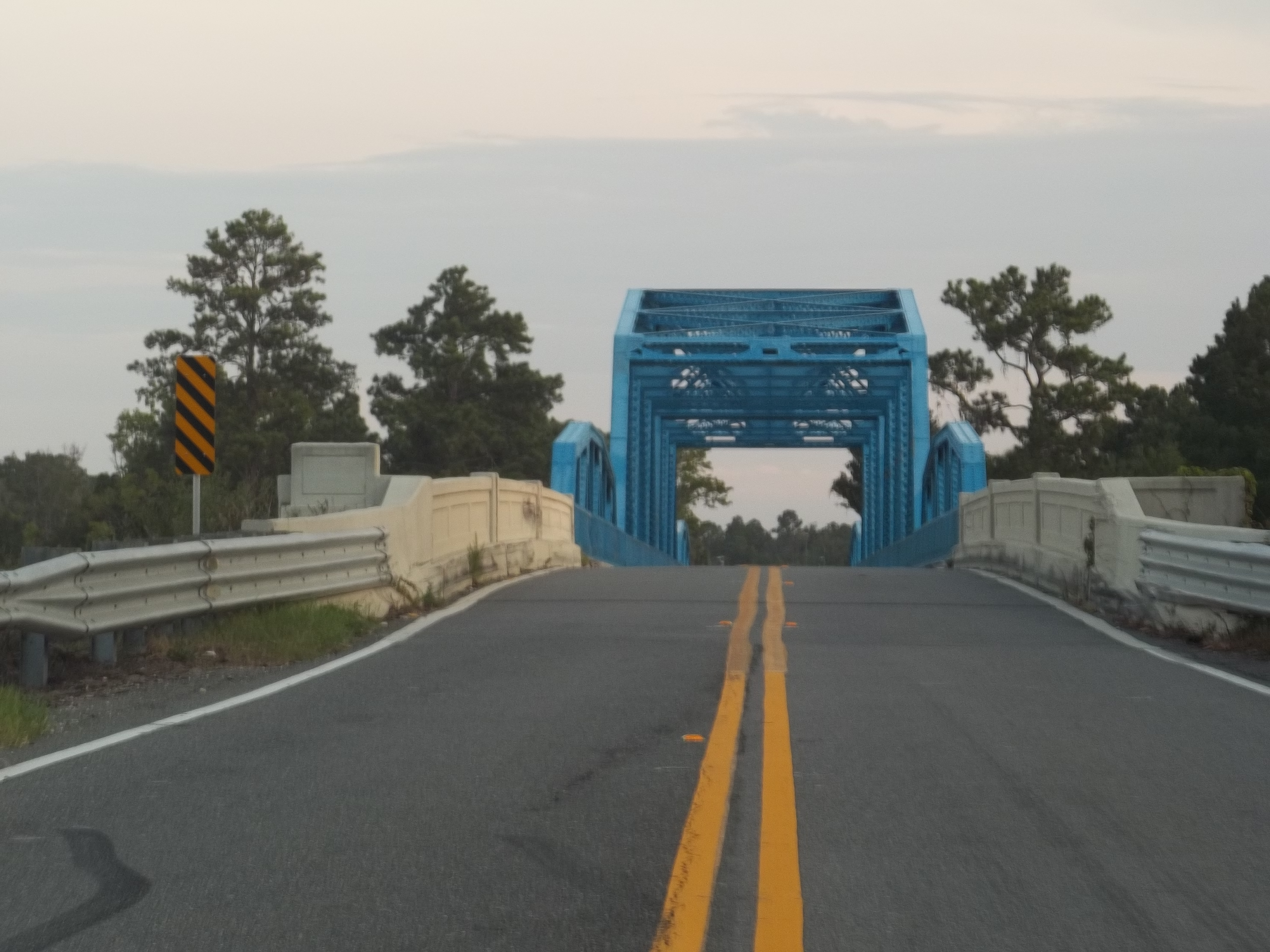
Bridge that US 17 and SR 25 use to cross over the St. Mary's River

SR 25 begins at the Florida state line, where US 17 enters Camden County from Nassau County, Florida, by crossing the St. Marys River on a through truss bridge. The two-lane highway closely parallels some railroad tracks of the First Coast Railroad, formerly part of the Seaboard Air Line Railroad (now CSX Transportation) through the southern part of the county. US 17/SR 25 crosses Catfish Creek before entering the city of Kingsland. The highways travel through the city as Lee Street, which crosses the St. Mary's Railroad at its junction with the First Coast Railroad line just south of SR 40 (King Street), which parallels the railroad east to St. Marys. Leaving Kingsland, the highway crosses over a spur from the rail line and crosses the main flow and the North Fork Crooked River. US 17/SR 25 parallels the First Coast Railroad to its terminus at the hamlet of Seals. The highway travels through Colesburg before entering the city of Woodbine, the county seat of Camden County. Within the city, US 17/SR 25 follows four-lane divided Bedell Avenue, which intersects SR 25 Spur (10th Street), a connector between the center of town and I-95. The highway intersects and begins to travel concurrently with SR 110 (4th Street) within the Woodbine Historic District. US 17/SR 25 and SR 110 reduce to two lanes and leave town by crossing the Satilla River.

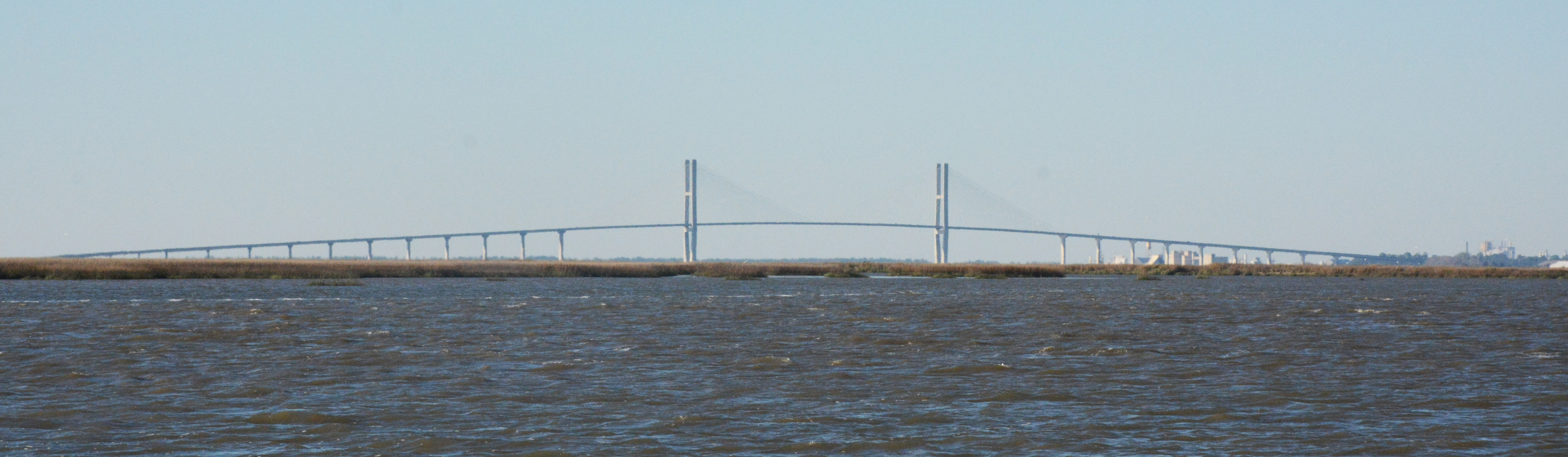
US 17/SR 25 uses the Sidney Lanier Bridge south of Brunswick.

US 17/SR 25 and SR 110 cross Piney Island Creek and meet the eastern terminus of SR 252 (Burnt Fort Road) at the hamlet of White Oak just south of White Oak Creek. The highways cross Waverly Creek then diverge in Waverly. US 17/SR 25 curves east and enters Glynn County by crossing the Little Satilla River at Spring Bluff. The concurrency curves north and within a suburban area has a four-way intersection with US 82/SR 520 (South Georgia Parkway) and the southern terminus of SR 303 (Blythe Island Highway). US 17/SR 25 turns east onto four-lane divided South Georgia Parkway, here also known as Jekyll Island Road, to travel concurrently with US 82/SR 520. The concurrency with US 82 ends at that highway's eastern terminus at a partial cloverleaf interchange with I-95. US 17 and SR 520 cross Fancy Bluff Creek onto Colonels Island and the highway becomes undivided at its crossing of the Golden Isles Terminal Railroad between a pair of automobile import and export marine terminals (Colonel's Island Terminal, Georgia Ports Authority). The highway becomes divided again shortly before SR 520 splits east as Downing Musgrove Causeway toward Jekyll Island as US 17/SR 25 curves north to cross the Brunswick River on the cable-stayed Sidney Lanier Bridge into the city of Brunswick.

=== Brunswick to Richmond Hill ===
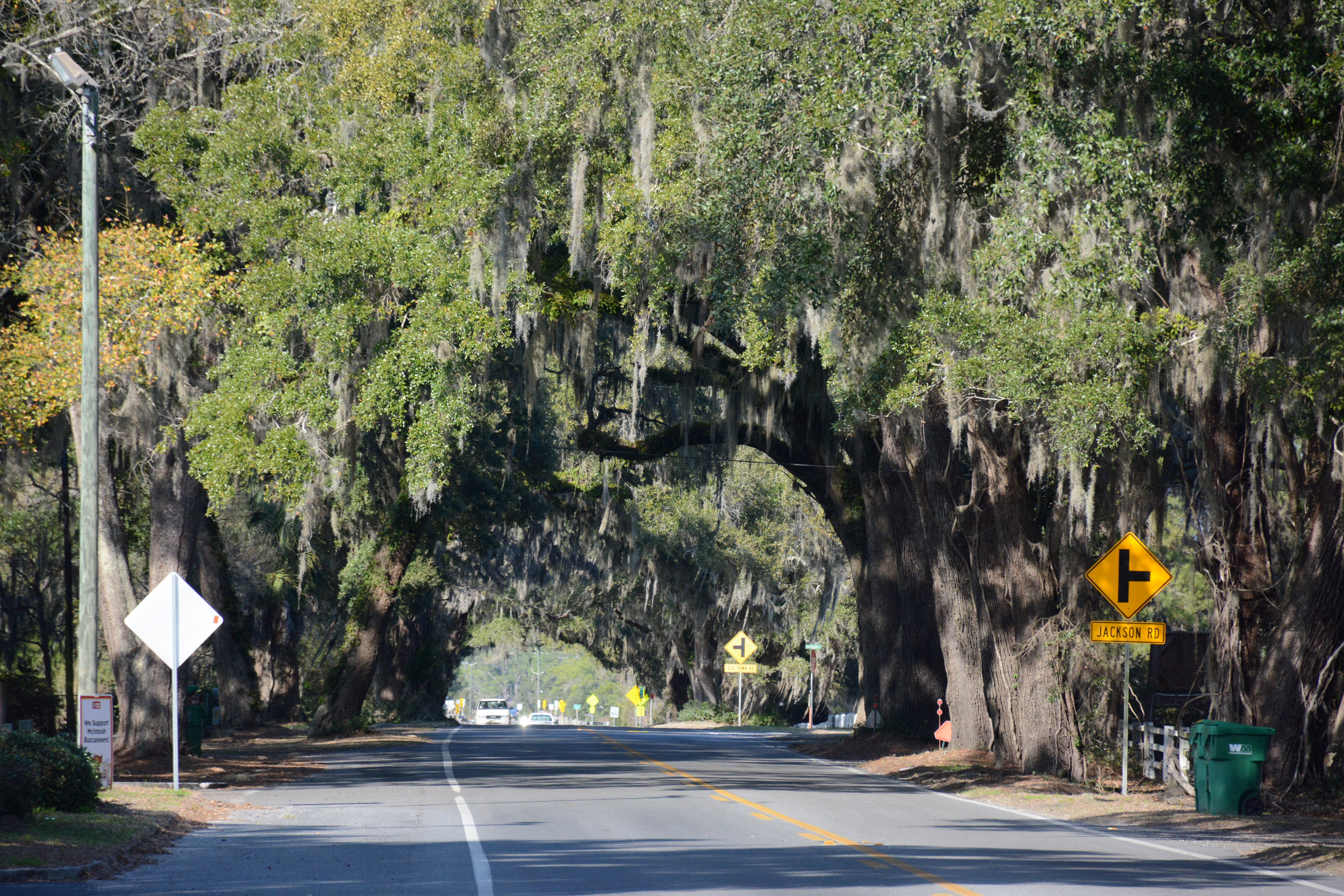
A canopy of oak trees over a section of US 17/SR 25 in McIntosh County

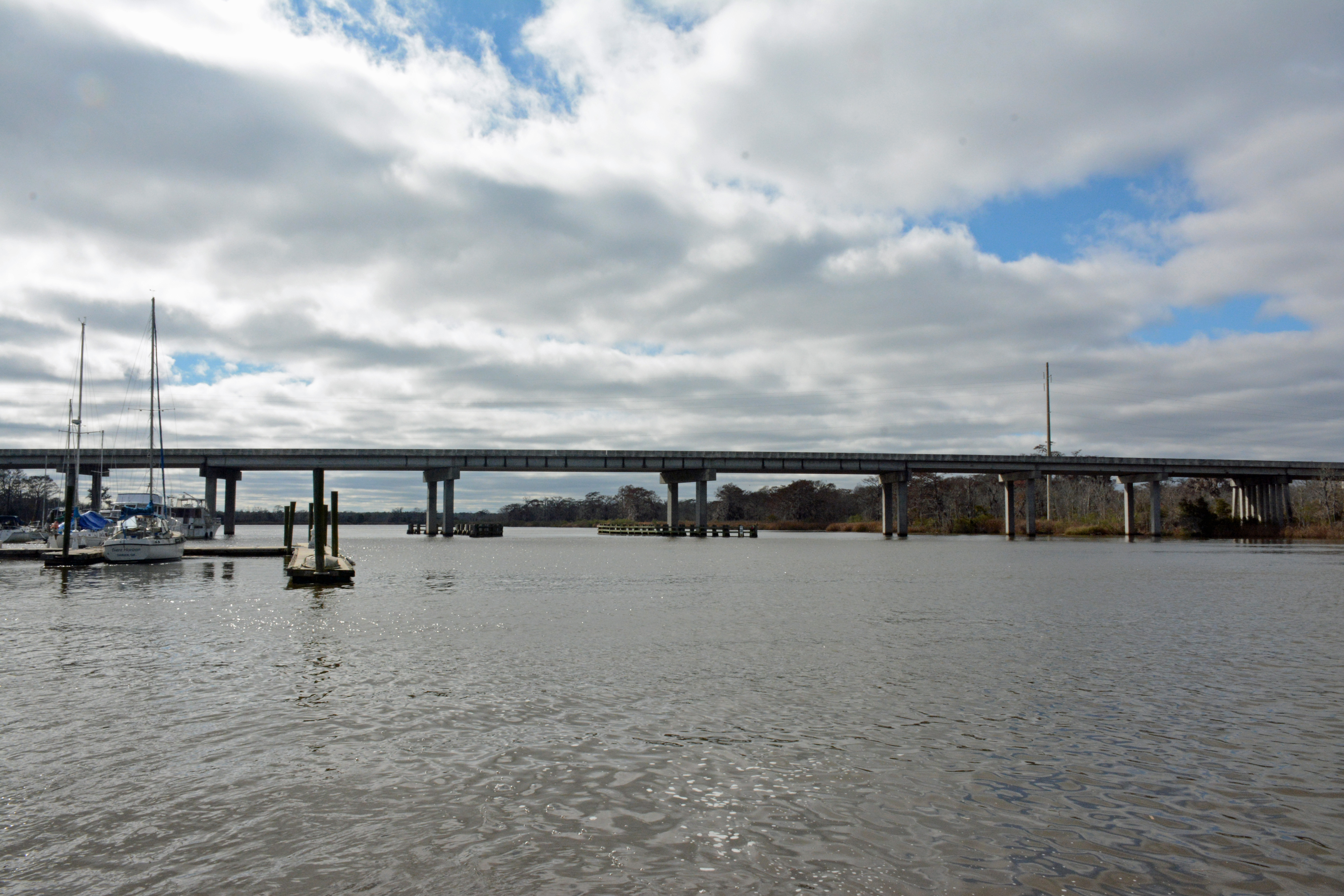
US 17/SR 25 bridge over the Altamaha River

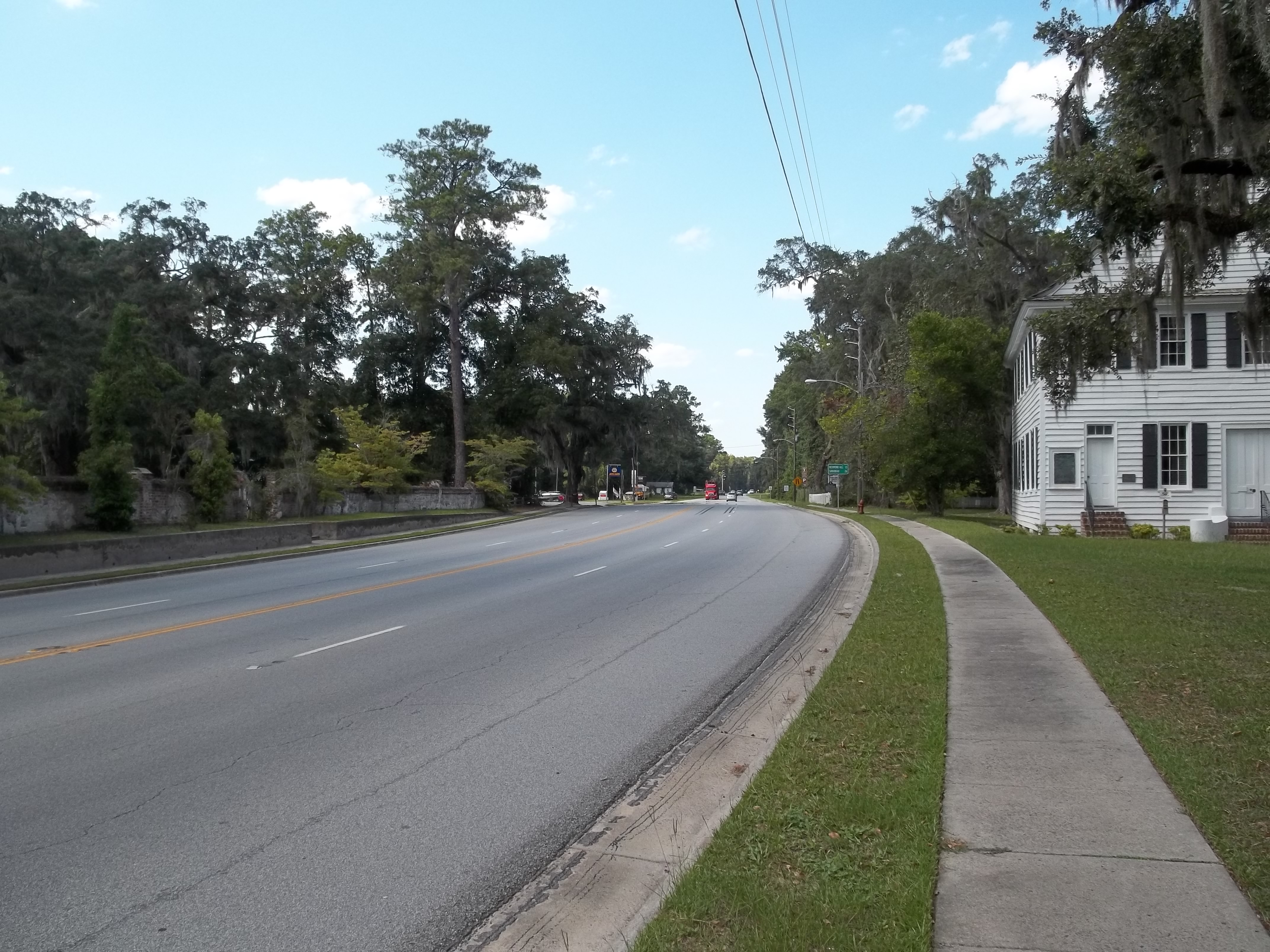
US 17/SR 25 through Midway, with the 1792 Midway Congregational Church on the right, and the even older Midway Cemetery on the left

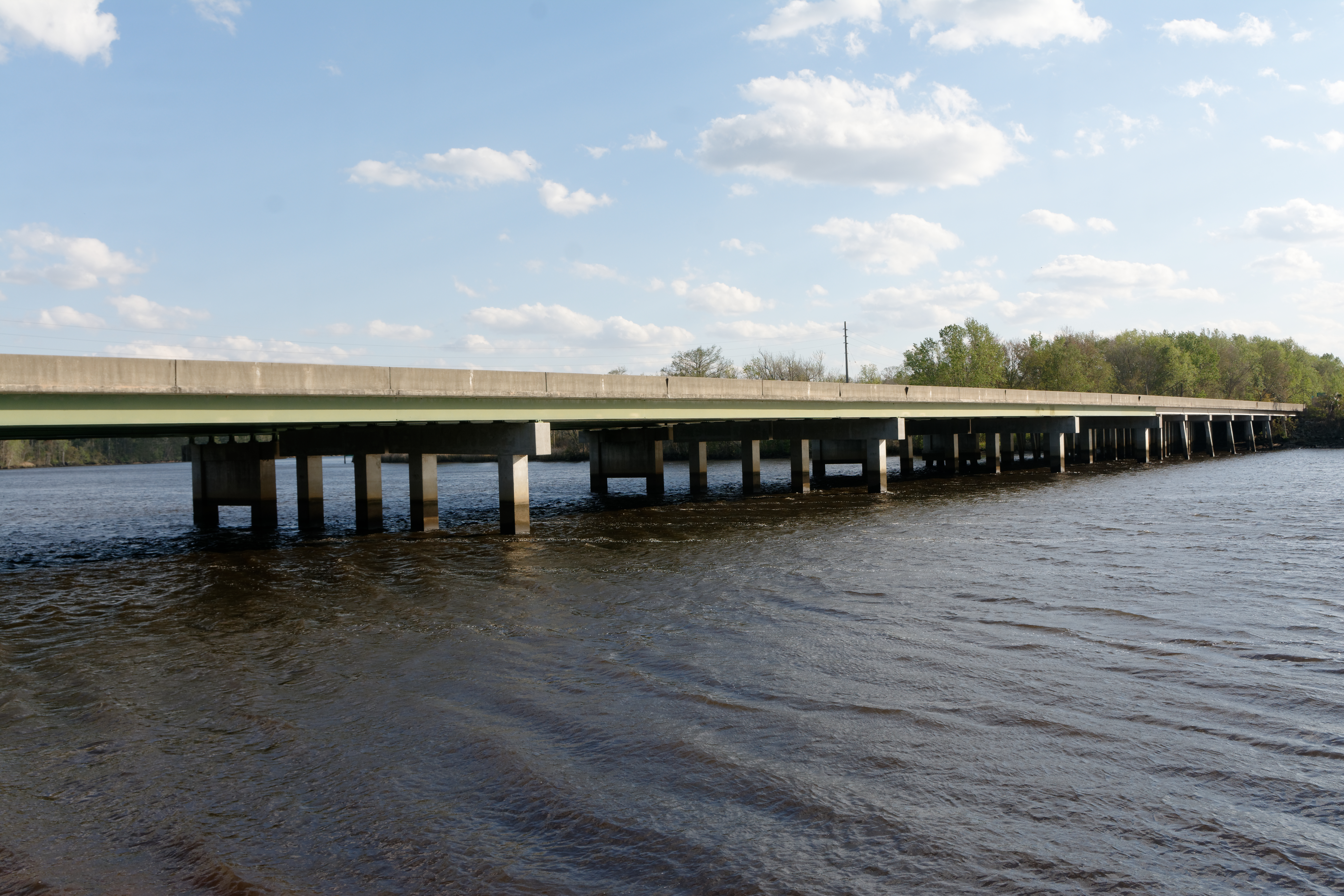
Crossing of US 17/SR 25 over the Ogeechee River

US 17/SR 25 heads along the eastern edge of Brunswick as Glynn Avenue, a controlled-access four-lane divided highway that has intersections with the southern terminus of US 341/SR 27 (4th Avenue) and US 25/SR 25 Connector (SR 25 Conn.; Gloucester Street). The highways gain a third lane southbound at US 25/SR 25 Conn. and a third lane northbound at the F.J. Torras Causeway to St. Simons, which is unsigned as SR 25 Spur. US 17/SR 25 crosses Cypress Mill Creek and leaves the city limits just south of its directional intersection with the southern terminus of SR 25 Spur (Golden Isles Parkway), which connects US 17/SR 25 with I-95. There is no direct access from southbound SR 25 Spur to northbound US 17/SR 25; that movement is made via an intersection with the northern terminus of SR 303 (Cypress Mill Road). US 17/SR 25 continues north with four lanes through a suburban area north of Brunswick. US 17/SR 25 reduces to two lanes just north of Chapel Crossing Road to the east of the Federal Law Enforcement Training Center. The highways reenter a rural area as they travel to the east of Brunswick Golden Isles Airport. US 17/SR 25 begins to travel concurrently with I-95 Business (I-95 Bus.)/SR 99 and travels along the edge of the Hofwyl-Broadfield Plantation State Historic Site before crossing the South Altamaha River into McIntosh County.

I-95 Bus., US 17, SR 25, and SR 99 travel through the Altamaha Waterfowl Management Area, during which the highways traverse Champney, Butler, and Generals islands. The highways cross between the islands by crossing the Champney and Butler rivers, which are branches of the Altamaha River, and the Darien River, where the highways enter the city of Darien, the county seat of McIntosh County, as Walton Street. In the center of town, SR 99 splits east onto Adams Street and I-95 Bus./US 17/SR 25 continues as North Way, which is a four-lane undivided street in the city. North of the city limits, I-95 Bus. splits west along SR 251 and US 17/SR 25 reduces to two lanes and passes Eden Field Airport. US 17/SR 25 crosses a pair of swamps around the hamlet of Ardick and intersects SR 99 (Ridge Road) again at Eulonia. The highways cross the Sapelo River and Buck Hill Swamp on its way to its crossing of the South Newport River at South Newport.

US 17/SR 25 continues north through Liberty County and meets I-95 at a diamond interchange. The highway enters the sparsely populated city of Riceboro at Payne Creek. US 17/SR 25 temporarily expands to four lanes between its crossing of the Riceboro Southern Railway, which is part of the former Seaboard Air Line corridor, and its intersection with the eastern terminus of SR 119 (E.B. Cooper Highway). At the north end of the city, the highways cross Riceboro Creek. US 17/SR 25 crosses Peacock Creek and enters the city of Midway at Porter Creek. US 17/SR 25 intersects US 84/SR 38 (Oglethorpe Highway) in the center of the city. The highways expand to a four-lane divided highway at its intersection with SR 196 (Leroy Coffer Highway) just before crossing Mount Hope Creek, a tributary of the Jerico River, at the Liberty–Bryan county line. US 17/SR 25 enters a suburban area and parallels the city limits of Richmond Hill, which is immediately to the west, until the highway enters the city proper just before its partial cloverleaf interchange with I-95. US 17/SR 25 crosses over CSX Transportation's Nahunta Subdivision and intersects SR 144 (Ford Avenue) before leaving the city and entering Chatham County by crossing the Ogeechee River at Kings Ferry.

=== Richmond Hill to Savannah ===
US 17/SR 25 continues northeast as Ogeechee Road through a suburban area. The highways meet SR 204 (Abercorn Expressway) at a diamond interchange in the suburb of Georgetown then crosses the Little Ogeechee River. US 17/SR 25 meets the southern terminus of SR 307 (Dean Forest Road) just west of Salt Creek, then continues east as a five-lane road with center turn lane. The highways cross over CSX Transportation's Nahunta Subdivision before reaching I-516/SR 21 (W.F. Lynes Parkway) at a diamond interchange at the city limits of Savannah. Ogeechee Road continues toward downtown Savannah as US 80/SR 26. I-516/US 17/US 80/SR 21/SR 25/SR 26 and I-516's unsigned companion designation of SR 421 head north-northeast from the interchange as a four-lane freeway. The freeway has a partial interchange with Tremont Street (southbound exit and northbound entrance), which serves Savannah station, and crosses CSX Transportation's Savannah Subdivision before its interchange with I-16 (Jim Gillis Historic Savannah Parkway). US 17 splits off to the east-southeast on six-lane I-16 while US 80, SR 21, SR 25, and SR 26 continue to the north-northeast concurrent with I-516.

I-16 and US 17 have a partial interchange with the former eastern terminus of SR 204, then curve northeast. The U.S. Highway diverges from I-16 one interchange west of the Interstate's eastern terminus and just south of a partial interchange (northbound exit and southbound entrance) with Gwinnett Street. Four-lane US 17, which is also signed as SR 404 Spur, travels through another pair of partial interchanges: a northbound exit and southbound entrance for Louisville Road and a southbound exit and northbound entrance for a spur to Oglethorpe Street. North of the latter interchange, US 17 ascends onto the cable-stayed Tallmadge Memorial Bridge, which crosses over Bay Street and the main channel of the Savannah River. The U.S. Highway descends onto Hutchinson Island, crosses over Wayne Shackelford Boulevard and the Savannah Port Terminal Railroad, and has a partial cloverleaf interchange with the boulevard, which leads to the Savannah Convention Center. Within the interchange, US 17 reduces to two lanes and crosses the Back River, another branch of the Savannah River, on a low-level bridge into Jasper County, South Carolina.

== History ==
=== 1920s and 1930s ===
SR 25 was established at least as early as 1919 from Brunswick north-northeast to Darien and then north-northwest to Hinesville, where it intersected SR 38. At this same time, SR 27 was established on a westward curve from St. Marys to a point northwest of Brunswick, following parts of the current path of US 17/SR 25 in this area. Also, SR 30 was established from a point southeast of Clyde to Savannah. In addition, SR 26 was established in Savannah. By September 1921, the portion of SR 27 had its southern terminus shifted westward to Kingsland and was under construction from there to SR 50 northwest of Brunswick. The Darien–Hinesville segment of SR 25 was shifted eastward to travel from Darien to SR 30 southeast of Clyde. In addition, an unnumbered road was built from SR 21 north-northwest of Savannah east-northeast to the South Carolina state line. Before October 1926, SR 27 was truncated to north-northwest of Brunswick and then extended into the city; its former path was redesignated as part of SR 25, with US 17 designated on it. There was no indication if it connected to the Brunswick–Darien segment. SR 30 was truncated to the intersection with SR 25 southeast of Clyde, with SR 25 replacing it to Savannah. US 17 was designated on the Brunswick–Savannah segment. US 17 and SR 25 were extended north-northwest from Savannah to the previously-unnumbered road and then east-northeast to the South Carolina state line.

Between November 1930 and January 1932, US 280 was established on SR 26 in Savannah; however, there was no indication of a concurrency with US 17/SR 25. In the last quarter of 1937, US 80 was extended on US 280/SR 26 from Blitchton to Tybee Island, thus beginning its concurrency with US 17/SR 25 in Savannah. The January 1938 Georgia Department of Transportation (GDOT) map is the first one that had an inset map of Savannah. It indicated that US 17/SR 25 entered the southern part of the city on Victory Drive. At Montgomery Street, they turned left and traveled to the north-northeast. At 37th Street, they began the concurrency with US 80/SR 26. At Liberty Street, US 80/SR 26 split off onto US 280, which ended here at the time. At Bay Street, US 17/SR 25 turned left onto SR 21, which ended at this intersection at the time. By September of the next year, US 80 was indicated to have been re-truncated to Blitchton.

=== 1940s and 1950s ===
In 1942, US 80 was indicated to be extended again, but possibly only as far east as the Bloomingdale area, if not all the way to Savannah. US 280 was truncated to Blitchton. Between January 1945 and November 1946, US 17/SR 25 were indicated to enter Savannah on Ogeechee Road. They turned right onto 37th Street. At Montgomery Street, they turned left onto US 80/SR 26. The four highways traveled to the north-northeast. At Bay Street, they turned left onto SR 21. US 80/SR 26 split off toward Pooler, and US 17/SR 21/SR 25 entered Industrial City Gardens, the name of Garden City at the time. By February 1948, US 17/SR 25 were indicated to have entered Savannah on Ogeechee Road. They turned right onto 52nd Street and traveled to the east-southeast. They turned left onto Whatley Avenue and traveled to the east-northeast. At Montgomery Street, they turned left and resumed their previous routing. Later that year, SR 50 was extended from a point west of Brunswick to Jekyll Island, thus forming what is the current southern bypass of US 17/SR 25 around the main part of Brunswick.

By August 1950, US 17/SR 25 was indicated to have been reverted to their 1938 routing in Savannah, on Ogeechee Road, 37th Street, Montgomery Street, and Bay Street. Their former path on 52nd Street, Whatley Avenue, and the southern part of Montgomery Street was redesignated as SR 25 Spur. In 1953, US 84 was extended on SR 50 from a point west of Brunswick to a point south of the city, if not all the way to Jekyll Island. At this time, the path of SR 25 Spur in Savannah was utilized as the northbound lanes of US 17/SR 25, while US 17/SR 25 southbound used the previous routing. Between June 1954 and June 1955, the northbound lanes of US 17/SR 25 (which were also the westbound lanes of US 80/SR 26) in the main part of Savannah continued to use Montgomery Street, while southbound US 17/SR 25 (eastbound US 80/SR 26) used West Broad Street. By July 1957, US 17/SR 25 were relocated onto the southern and eastern bypass of the main part of Brunswick, and thus a concurrency with US 84/SR 50 for part of this portion. Their former alignment was partially redesignated as SR 303.

=== 1960s to 2000s ===
The 1966 GDOT map was the first one to feature an inset of Brunswick. The concurrency with US 84 was indicated to begin at the current western end of the US 82 concurrency near Brunswick and continued to the US 341/SR 27 intersection in the city, where US 84 joined that concurrency. In Savannah, SR 26 Loop, the predecessor of I-516, was proposed on basically I-516's current path. In 1966, the portion of SR 26 Loop used for US 17/SR 25 was indicated to have been under construction from Ogeechee Road to Augusta Avenue. The short portion past Augusta Avenue was not built at the time. The next year, the portion of SR 26 Loop from I-16 to Augusta Avenue was still under construction, while the portion from Ogeechee Road to I-16 was indicated to be "OPEN SPRING '68". In 1968, this portion was opened. The next year, the portion from I-16 to Augusta Avenue was opened. Also, SR 25 Spur in Savannah was redesignated as SR 26 Conn.

In 1970, SR 26 Loop was proposed to be extended past Augusta Avenue, north-northeast to Bay Street (east-southeast of Augusta Avenue), then on a northern curve to Bay Street again (between Augusta Avenue and Fair Street). In 1977, SR 26 Loop was decommissioned, with SR 21 routed on its former path. The westward extension of this highway was opened.

Between January 1984 and January 1986, I-516 was designated on SR 26 Loop's former path (SR 21). Also, US 17/US 80/SR 25/SR 26 was shifted onto I-516/SR 21. Part of the former path, on Broad Street and Bay Street, was redesignated as part of US 17 Alt./SR 25 Alt. Also, SR 26 Conn. in Savannah was decommissioned. In 1988, SR 404 Spur was proposed from I-16 from just east of I-16's interchange with SR 204 in Savannah and then east-northeast, north-northwest, and north-northeast to US 17 Alt./SR 25 Alt. on Hutchinson Island, just south of the South Carolina state line. Also, SR 50 was truncated out of the Brunswick area, mostly replaced by SR 520. The next year, the paths of US 82 and US 84 east of Waycross were swapped. The southern highway, now US 82, was also truncated to the I-95 interchange near Brunswick.

In 1995, the path of US 17 between Savannah and Hardeeville, South Carolina, was shifted to the southeast, onto I-16 and SR 404 Spur, thus replacing US 17 Alt./SR 25 Alt. The portion of US 17 in South Carolina was replaced by a westward extension of South Carolina Highway 170.

In 2001, the unsigned companion designation SR 421 was designated on I-516.

== Future ==
US 17 is currently being widened in northern Glynn County from two to four lanes for a six-mile-long (9.7 km) segment from Yacht Drive where it currently becomes two lanes north to SR 99. This segment of highway frequently gets congested during peak hours, lacks left turn lanes, and has had a high rate of accidents in recent years. Construction began in 2023.

== Major intersections ==
| County | Location | mi | km | Exit | Destinations | Notes |
|---|---|---|---|---|---|---|
| St. Marys River | | 0.000 | 0.000 | | US 17 south (SR 5 south) / SR 25 begins – Jacksonville | Southern end of SR 25 concurrency; continuation into Florida |
| Camden | Kingsland | 4.056 | 6.527 | | SR 40 (King Avenue) to I-95 – St. Marys, Colerain | |
| Camden | | 7.039 | 11.328 | | Harrietts Bluff Road east to I-95 | Western terminus of Harrietts Bluff Road |
| Camden | Woodbine | 15.238 | 24.523 | | SR 25 Spur east (10th Street) to I-95 | Western terminus of SR 25 Spur |
| Camden | Woodbine | 15.783 | 25.400 | | SR 110 west (4th Street) – Folkston, Camden County Courthouse | Southern end of SR 110 concurrency (SR 110 unsigned for length of concurrency) |
| Camden | Satilla River | 16.292 | 26.219 | | J. Edwin "Fat" Godley Memorial Bridge | |
| Camden | White Oak | 20.232 | 32.560 | | SR 252 west (Burnt Fort Road) – Folkston | Eastern terminus of SR 252 |
| Camden | Waverly | 24.551 | 39.511 | | SR 110 west / Horse Stamp Church Road east – Atkinson | Northern end of SR 110 concurrency; western terminus of Horse Stamp Church Road |
| Little Satilla River | | 31.640 | 50.920 | | C.L. McCarthy Sr. Memorial Bridge | |
| Glynn | | 34.281 | 55.170 | | US 82 west / SR 520 west (Corridor Z) / SR 303 north (Blythe Island Highway) – Waynesville, Waycross | Western end of US 82 and SR 520 concurrencies; southern terminus of SR 303 |
| Glynn | | 34.922 | 56.202 | | I-95 (SR 405) / US 82 ends – Jacksonville, Savannah | Eastern end of US 82 concurrency; eastern terminus of US 82; I-95 exit 29; Corporal Michael Douglas Young Memorial Interchange |
| Glynn | Fancy Bluff Creek | 36.407 | 58.591 | | Edward A. Logan Memorial Bridge | |
| Glynn | | 40.359 | 64.952 | | SR 520 east – Jekyll Island | Eastern end of SR 520 concurrency |
| Glynn | Brunswick River | 41.262 | 66.405 | | Sidney Lanier Bridge | |
| Glynn | Brunswick | 42.653 | 68.643 | | US 341 north (Fourth Avenue / SR 27 north) – Port of Brunswick | Southern terminus of US 341/SR 27 |
| Glynn | Brunswick | 43.946 | 70.724 | | US 25 north / SR 25 Conn. north (Gloucester Street) – Jesup | Southern terminus of US 25/SR 25 Conn. |
| Glynn | Brunswick | 44.541 | 71.682 | | SR 25 Spur east (F.J. Torras Causeway) / Stacy Street north – St. Simons Island, Sea Island, Fort Frederica | Western terminus of unsigned SR 25 Spur E (F.J. Torras Causeway); southern terminus of Stacy Street |
| Glynn | Brunswick | 46.172 | 74.307 | | SR 25 Spur north (Golden Isles Parkway) to I-95 – Federal Law Enforcement Training Centers, Brunswick Golden Isles Airport | Southern terminus of SR 25 Spur; no direct access from SR 25 Spur to northbound US 17/SR 25 |
| Glynn | Brunswick | 46.701 | 75.158 | | SR 303 south (Cypress Mill Road) | Northern terminus of SR 303 |
| Glynn | | 55.493 | 89.307 | | I-95 BL south / SR 99 south to I-95 – Sterling | Southern end of I-95 Bus. and SR 99 concurrencies |
| Altamaha River | | 57.200 | 92.054 | | Harold James Friedman Memorial Bridge | |
| McIntosh | Darien | 60.386 | 97.182 | | SR 99 north (Adams Street) – Ridgeville, Fort King George, Sapelo Island | Northern end of SR 99 concurrency |
| McIntosh | Darien | 61.481 | 98.944 | | I-95 BL north / SR 251 north to I-95 – Savannah, Townsend | Northern end of I-95 Bus. concurrency; southern terminus of SR 251 |
| McIntosh | Eulonia | 71.507 | 115.079 | | SR 99 (Ridge Road) to I-95 / SR 57 – Crescent, Ludowici, Sapelo Island | |
| Liberty | | 80.841 | 130.101 | | I-95 (SR 405) – Jacksonville, Savannah | I-95 exit 67 |
| Liberty | Riceboro | 87.779 | 141.267 | | SR 119 north (E.B. Cooper Highway) – Walthourville | Southern terminus of SR 119 |
| Liberty | Midway | 92.054 | 148.147 | | US 84 / SR 38 (Oglethorpe Highway) to I-95 – Hinesville, Ft. Stewart, Fort Morris, Dorchester Academy | |
| Liberty | | 98.169 | 157.988 | | SR 196 west (Leroy Coffer Highway) – Hinesville | Eastern terminus of SR 196 |
| Bryan | Richmond Hill | 103.228 | 166.129 | | I-95 (SR 405) to I-16 – Brunswick, Savannah | I-95 exit 87 |
| Bryan | Richmond Hill | 105.144 | 169.213 | | SR 144 (Ford Avenue) to I-95 – Keller, Fort McAllister Historic Park | |
| Ogeechee River | | 107.491 | 172.990 | | Harvey Granger Bridge | |
| Chatham | Georgetown | 110.493 | 177.821 | | SR 204 (Abercorn Street) to I-95 – Pembroke, Savannah, Wormsloe State Historic Site, Skidaway Island State Park, Hunter Army Airfield, Savannah Intl. | |
| Chatham | Garden City | 114.222 | 183.822 | | SR 307 north (Dean Forest Road) – Garden City, Port Wentworth | Southern terminus of SR 307 |
| Chatham | Savannah | 116.777 | 187.934 | | Chatham Parkway to I-16 – Veterans Parkway | |
| Chatham | Savannah | 118.231 | 190.274 | 3 | I-516 east / US 80 east (SR 26 east) / SR 21 south (W.F. Lynes Parkway / SR 421 south) to I-16 – Savannah Tech, Hunter Army Airfield, VA Clinic | Southern end of I-516/US 80/SR 21/SR 26/SR 421 concurrency; southern end of freeway section; exit numbers follow I-516 |
| Chatham | Savannah | 119.027 | 191.555 | 4 | Tremont Avenue – Amtrak Station | Southbound exit and northbound entrance |
| Chatham | Savannah | 119.446 | 192.230 | 5 164B | I-16 west (SR 404 east) / I-516 (SR 421) / US 80 west / SR 25 north / SR 21 north (W.F. Lynes Parkway west / SR 26 west) | Northern end of I-516/US 80/SR 21/SR 26/SR 421 and SR 25 concurrencies; southern end of I-16/SR 404 concurrency; exit numbers follow I-16; I-516 exit 5; I-16 exit 164A |
| Chatham | Savannah | 120.561 | 194.024 | 165 | West 37th Street / Abercorn Street | Eastbound exit and westbound entrance; former eastern terminus of SR 204 |
| Chatham | Savannah | 120.860 | 194.505 | 166 | I-16 east (SR 404 east) / SR 404 Spur begins – Downtown Savannah | Northern end of I-16/SR 404 concurrency; southern end of SR 404 Spur concurrency; southern terminus of SR 404 Spur; northbound exit and southbound entrance |
| Chatham | Savannah | 121.206 | 195.062 | | Gwinnett Street | Northbound exit and southbound entrance |
| Chatham | Savannah | 121.834 | 196.073 | | Louisville Road – Visitors Center | Northbound exit and southbound entrance |
| Chatham | Savannah | 122.097 | 196.496 | | SR 25 Conn. south (Oglethorpe Avenue) – Savannah | Southbound exit and northbound entrance; northern terminus of SR 25 Conn. |
| Chatham | Savannah River | 122.722 | 197.502 | Talmadge Memorial Bridge | | |
| Chatham | Hutchinson Island | 123.393 | 198.582 | | Savannah Harbor Parkway – Hutchinson Island, Convention Center | Northern end of freeway section |
| Savannah River | | 123.930 | 199.446 | | US 17 north / SR 404 Spur ends – Hardeeville, Charleston | Northern end of SR 404 Spur concurrency; northern terminus of SR 404 Spur; continuation into South Carolina |
1.000 mi = 1.609 km; 1.000 km = 0.621 mi: Concurrency terminus; Incomplete access

== State Route 25 ==
State Route 25
- Location: Kingsland–Port Wentworth
- Length: 128.77 mi (207.24 km)

State Route 25 (SR 25) is US 17's companion route along much of the U.S. Highway's course through Georgia. The state highway has a total length of 128.77 miles (207.24 km); the highway travels concurrently with US 17 for 119.45 miles (192.24 km) from the Florida state line south of Kingsland north to Savannah. SR 25 has a length of 9.32 miles (15.00 km) from its split with US 17 in Savannah to the South Carolina state line in Port Wentworth.

== See also ==
- Special routes of U.S. Route 17

U.S. Route 17
| Previous state: Florida | Georgia | Next state: South Carolina |
