= Interstate 95 in Georgia =

Section of Interstate Highway in Georgia

Interstate 95
- I-95 highlighted in red

Route information
- Maintained by GDOT
- Length: 112.00 mi (180.25 km)
- Existed: 1968–present
- History: Completed in 1977
- NHS: Entire route

Major junctions
- South end: I-95 at the Florida state line in Kingsland
- US 17 / US 82 / SR 25 / SR 520 near Brunswick; US 25 / US 341 / SR 27 near Brunswick; I-95 BL / SR 99 near Darien; I-95 BL / SR 251 in Darien; US 17 / SR 25 in Riceboro; US 84 / SR 38 near Midway; US 17 / SR 25 in Richmond Hill; I-16 in Pooler; US 80 / SR 26 in Pooler
- North end: I-95 at the South Carolina state line near Hardeeville, SC

Location
- Country: United States
- State: Georgia
- Counties: Camden, Glynn, McIntosh, Liberty, Bryan, Chatham, Effingham

Highway system
- Interstate Highway System; Main; Auxiliary; Suffixed; Business; Future; Georgia State Highway System; Interstate; US; State; Special
← SR 94	→ SR 95
← SR 404	SR 405	→ SR 406

Interstate 95 (I-95), the main Interstate Highway on the East Coast of the United States, serves the Atlantic Coast of the US state of Georgia. It crosses into the state from Florida at the St. Marys River near Kingsland and travels to the north past the cities of Brunswick and Savannah to the South Carolina state line at the Savannah River near Port Wentworth. The route also passes through the cities of Richmond Hill, Darien, and Woodbine. I-95 in Georgia has the unsigned designation of State Route 405 (SR 405).

== Route description ==
All of I-95 in Georgia has three lanes in each direction, except in the Brunswick metropolitan area and in the area of the I-16 Intersection, where it has four lanes in each direction. From the Florida state line to the west of Savannah, I-95 travels along the US Route 17 (US 17) corridor, passing near or through marshlands, and is close to the Atlantic coastline.

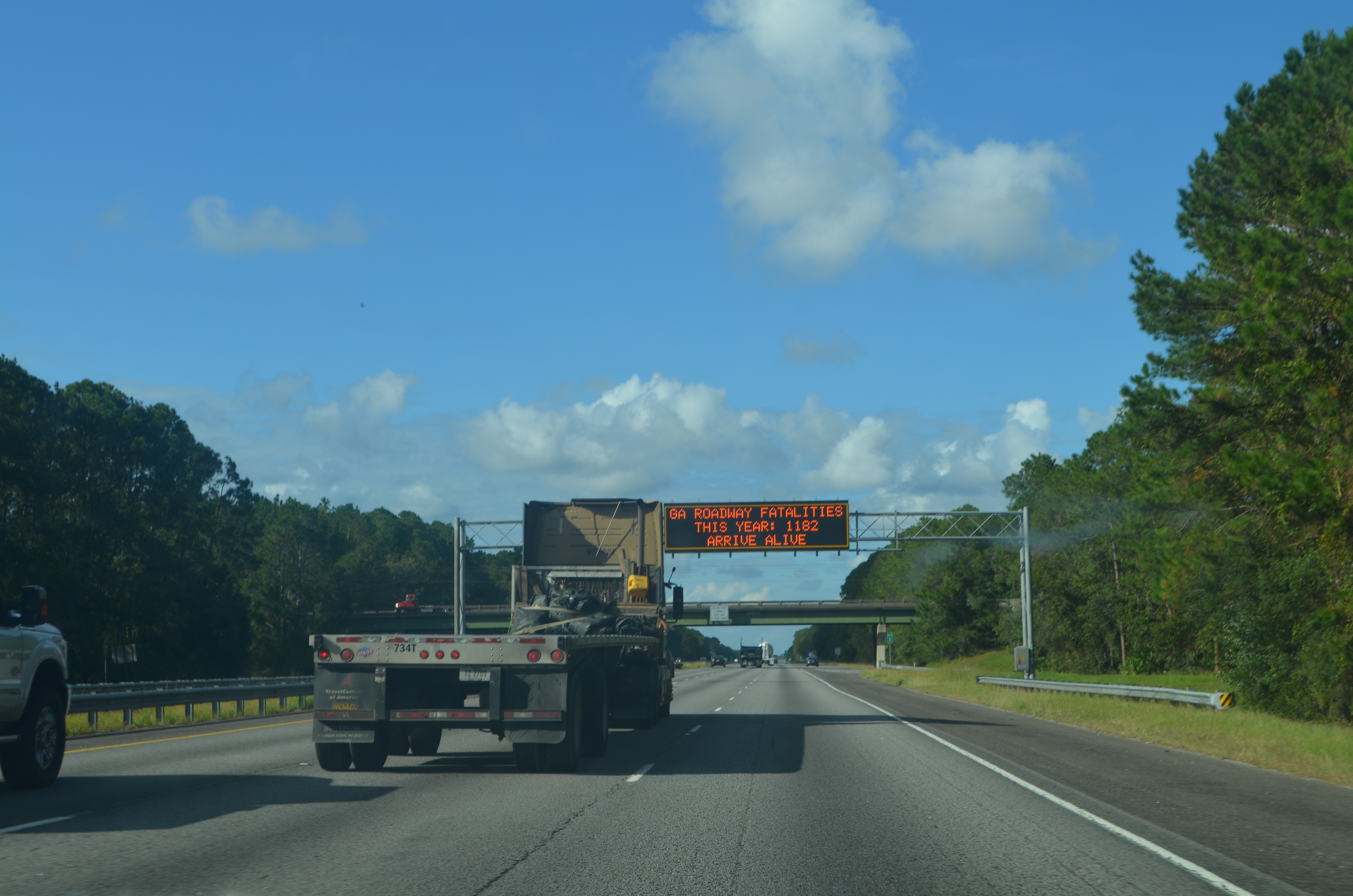
Annual traffic fatalities variable sign over I-95 north

The highway enters Georgia via twin bridges over the St. Marys River, where it immediately enters the city of Kingsland, intersecting SR 40. The Interstate continues generally north-northeast, bypassing the smaller communities of Woodbine and Waverly en route to Brunswick, where it intersects US 17, US 25, and US 341. The freeway leaves Brunswick, bypassing the cities of Darien and Midway, before reaching the southern suburbs of Savannah. The route first encounters US 17 again, this time in Richmond Hill, before intersecting SR 204, a busy freeway and southern bypass into Savannah. The route then intersects with I-16 and US 80 in Pooler, also providing direct access to Savannah/Hilton Head International Airport via the Airways Avenue exit (exit 104). The route then reenters the city limits of Savannah and then intersects SR 17. After that, the final exit in Georgia is in Port Wentworth, where it intersects SR 21/SR 30 and SR 565 (Savannah River Parkway), the major thoroughfare between Augusta and Savannah. I-95 leaves Georgia via twin bridges over the Savannah River and heads north into South Carolina.

The state welcome centers on both ends of I-95 are integrated with other interchanges. The northbound welcome center is built into the northbound offramp with exit 1, while the onramp from here runs under a bridge beneath the same offramp before leading back onto northbound I-95. The southbound welcome center can be found just after the offramp for the first southbound truck weighing center, only for both facilities to share an onramp back to southbound I-95. Other rest areas, weigh stations, and visitor centers operate independently with no access to any other facilities or destinations.

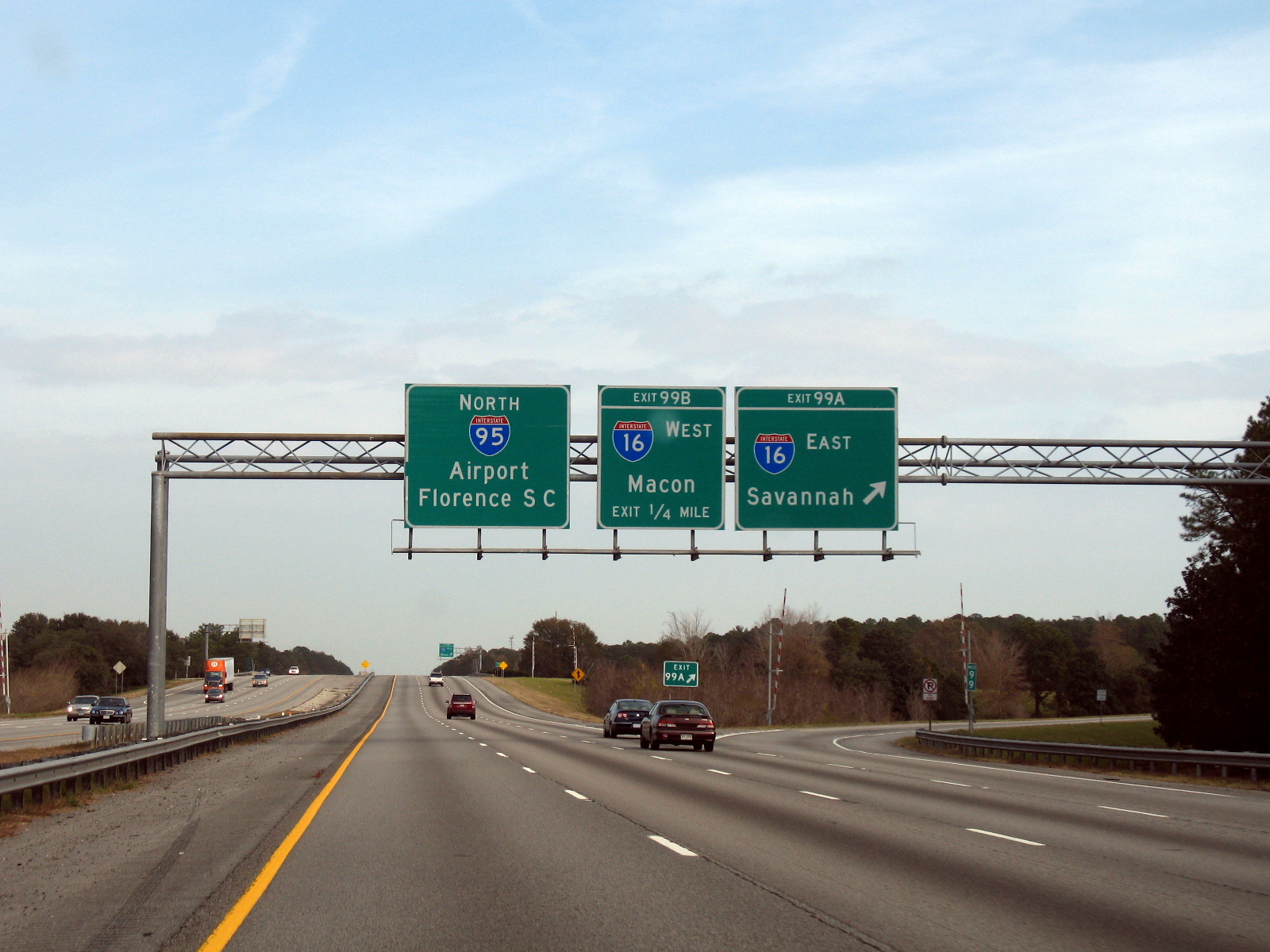
Northbound I-95 at the interchange with I-16 in December 2007; note the crossing gates at the on- and off-ramps.

I-95 intersects I-16 near Savannah (exit 99). Ramps to and from the eastbound lanes of I-16 feature barrier gates to prevent traffic from entering I-16 in the wrong direction during contraflow lane reversal for hurricane evacuations.

The entire length of I-95 in Georgia is part of the National Highway System, a system of routes determined to be the most important for the nation's economy, mobility, and defense.

== History ==
=== 1960s ===
In 1965, I-95 was proposed from the Florida state line to SR 251 near Darien. It was under construction from there to SR 99 near Crescent. It was proposed from there to the South Carolina state line. In 1966, it was under construction from its southern interchange with SR 99 to just north of SR 131 in South Newport. In 1967, it was under construction just north of South Newport. It was under construction from Richmond Hill to I-16 near Savannah. In 1968, it was under construction from the Florida state line to SR 40 in Kingsland. It was also under construction from its southern interchange with SR 99 to SR 251 near Darien. It was open as I-95 from SR 251 to its northern interchange with SR 99 in Eulonia. It was under construction from Eulonia to US 17/SR 25 north of South Newport.

=== 1970s ===
In 1970, the highway was under construction from the Florida state line to just southeast of Woodbine. It was also under construction from US 25/US 341/SR 27 near Brunswick to SR 251 near Darien. It also had an under construction from Eulonia to I-16. In 1971, it was under construction from the Florida state line to northeast of White Oak and also between the US 17/SR 25 interchanges north of South Newport and in Richmond Hill. In 1972, it was open from the Florida state line to SR 40 in Kingsland. It was under construction from Kingsland to northeast of White Oak. It was under construction from east of Waverly to US 25/US 341/SR 27 near Brunswick. It was open from there to US 17/SR 25 north of South Newport. It was open from Richmond Hill to I-16. It was under construction from just west of the South Carolina state line to the line. In 1973, it was open from the Florida state line to southeast of Woodbine. It was under construction from there to near Brunswick and from I-16 to the South Carolina state line. In 1974, the highway was open from the Brunswick to SR 38 southeast of Midway. In 1976, it was open from the Florida state line to US 17/US 84/SR 25/SR 50 southeast of Brunswick. It was open from US 25/US 341/SR 27 near Brunswick to I-16. In 1977, it was open for its entire length.

=== After completion ===
In 1998, the Georgia State Senate passed a resolution to designate the portion of I-95 between the Ogeechee River (Bryan–Chatham county line) north to the Savannah River in the Savannah metropolitan area as the Tom Coleman Highway, in honor of Tom Coleman, a Democrat who served as state senator from 1981 to 1995.

Until 2000, the state of Georgia used the sequential interchange numbering system on all of its Interstate Highways. The first exit on each highway would begin with the number 1 and increase numerically with each exit. In 2000, the Georgia Department of Transportation switched to a mileage-based exit system, in which the exit number corresponded to the nearest milepost.

Construction to widen I-95 from two to three lanes started with the Chatham County segment in 1989, with the other county segments done in phases, with the project completed throughout Georgia on December 10, 2010.

== Exit list ==
County	Location	mi	km	Old exit	New exit	Destinations	Notes
St. Mary's River		0.00	0.00			I-95 south (SR 9) – Jacksonville	Continuation into Florida
Camden	Kingsland	1.07	1.72	1	1	St. Marys Road – St. Marys	Northbound traffic can access the Georgia Welcome Center using exit 1.
Camden	Kingsland	3.27	5.26	2	3	SR 40 (East King Avenue) – Kingsland, St. Marys	
Camden	Kingsland	5.73	9.22	2A	6	Laurel Island Parkway – Kingsland , St. Marys	
Camden	Kingsland	7.23	11.64	3	7	Harriets Bluff Road	
Camden	Woodbine	14.24	22.92	4	14	SR 25 Spur west – Woodbine	GA 25 Spur overlap ends south
Camden		22.44	36.11	—	22	Horse Stamp Church Road	Fully opened April 3, 2012
Camden		26.46	42.58	5	26	Dover Bluff Road	
Glynn		29.26	47.09	6	29	US 17 / US 82 west / SR 520 – Brunswick, Jekyll Island, Waverly	Eastern terminus of US 82
Glynn	Dock Junction	35.86	57.71	7	36	US 25 (New Jesup Highway) / US 341 / SR 27 – Jesup, Brunswick	Signed as exits 36A (south) and 36B (north); previously signed as exits 7A and 7B accordingly
Glynn	Dock Junction	37.69	60.66	8	38	SR 25 Spur (Golden Isles Parkway) to US 17 – Brunswick	
Glynn		42.40	68.24	9	42	SR 99 – Darien	Southern terminus of I-95 Bus.
McIntosh	Darien	48.88	78.66	10	49	SR 251 – Darien	Northern terminus of I-95 Bus.
McIntosh		58.32	93.86	11	58	SR 57 / SR 99 south – Eulonia, Ludowici	Northern terminus of SR 99
Liberty		67.29	108.29	12	67	US 17 / SR 25 – South Newport, Riceboro	
Liberty	Midway	75.96	122.25	13	76	US 84 west / SR 38 west – Midway, Sunbury	Eastern terminus of US 84/SR 38
Bryan	Richmond Hill			-	82	Belfast-Keller Road	Opened January 22, 2021
Bryan	Richmond Hill	87.01	140.03	14	87	US 17 / SR 25 (Coastal Highway) – Richmond Hill, Midway	
Bryan	Richmond Hill	89.38	143.84	15	90	SR 144 – Fort Stewart, Richmond Hill	Signed also as Ford Avenue northbound; previously signed as Old Clyde Road until circa 2016
Chatham	Savannah	93.45	150.39	16	94	SR 204 – Savannah, Pembroke	
Chatham	Pooler	98.76	158.94	17	99	I-16 (Jim Gillis Historic Savannah Parkway / SR 404) – Savannah, Macon	Signed as exits 99A (east) and 99B (west) northbound; exit 99 southbound; previously signed as exits 17A and 17B accordingly
Chatham	Pooler	101.51	163.36	18	102	US 80 / SR 26 – Pooler, Garden City	
Chatham	Pooler	103.50	166.57	18A	104	Pooler Parkway / Airways Avenue – Savannah/Hilton Head International Airport	
Chatham	Savannah	105.92	170.46	—	106	SR 17 (Jimmy DeLoach Parkway) – Bloomingdale, Port Wentworth	
Chatham	Port Wentworth	108.03	173.86	19	109	SR 21 / SR 30 (East branch of Savannah River Parkway / SR 565) – Port Wentworth	
Effingham	No major junctions						
Savannah River		112.03	180.29			I-95 north – Florence	Continuation into South Carolina
1.000 mi = 1.609 km; 1.000 km = 0.621 mi: Unopened

== Business loops ==
=== Darien ===
Interstate 95 Business
- Location: Darien
- Length: 8.7 mi (14.0 km)
- Tourist routes: Altamaha Historic Scenic Byway

Interstate 95 Business (I-95 Bus.) for Darien begins at exit 42 on I-95 and travels concurrent with SR 99. I-95 Bus. and SR 99 then join US 17/SR 25 (Ocean Highway; Altamaha Historic Scenic Byway), and the four highways enter Darien. There, SR 99 splits off, while I-95 Bus. continues following US 17/SR 25 to an intersection with the southern terminus of SR 251 just north of Darien. Here, I-95 Bus. turns onto SR 251 and follows it until it reunites with I-95 at its northern terminus at exit 49. I-95 Bus. is only signed on I-95 at each exit (northbound at the southern terminus and southbound at the northern terminus) and is not signed on any of its constituent highways.

County	Location	mi	km	Destinations	Notes
Glynn		0.0– 0.3	0.0– 0.48	I-95 / SR 99 south – Brunswick, Savannah, Sterling	Southern end of SR 99 concurrency; southern terminus; I-95 exit 42
Glynn		1.4	2.3	US 17 south / SR 25 south (Altamaha Historic Scenic Byway) – Hofwyl–Broadfield Plantation State Historic Site	Southern end of US 17/SR 25 concurrency
Altamaha River		2.9 3.4	4.7 5.5	Harold James Friedman Memorial Bridge	
McIntosh	Darien	6.3	10.1	SR 99 north (Adams Street) / Third Street West west – Ridgeville, Fort King George, Sapelo Island	Northern end of SR 99 concurrency; eastern terminus of Third Street West
McIntosh		7.4	11.9	US 17 north (SR 25 north) / SR 251 begins – Savannah	Northern end of US 17/SR 25 concurrency; southern end of SR 251 concurrency; southern terminus of SR 251; I-95 Bus. turns left onto SR 251.
McIntosh		8.5– 8.7	13.7– 14.0	I-95 / SR 251 north – Brunswick, Savannah, Townsend	Northern end of SR 251 concurrency; northern terminus; I-95 exit 49
1.000 mi = 1.609 km; 1.000 km = 0.621 mi: Concurrency terminus

=== Brunswick ===
Interstate 95 Business
- Location: Brunswick
- Length: 15.7 mi (25.3 km)

Former Interstate 95 Business (I-95 Bus.) for Brunswick used to serve Brunswick and the Golden Isles of Georgia between exits 29 and 38 (former exits 6 and 8). It was concurrent with US 17/SR 25 but no longer exists. The highway returned to I-95 via SR 25 Spur.

== See also ==
Interstate 95
Previous state: Florida	Georgia	Next state: South Carolina
