= Georgia State Route 99 =

State highway in Georgia

State Route 99
- SR 99 highlighted in red

Route information
- Maintained by GDOT
- Length: 38.9 mi (62.6 km)
- Existed: April 1932–present
- Tourist routes: Altamaha Historic Scenic Byway

Major junctions
- South end: US 82 / SR 520 southwest of Sterling
- US 25 / US 341 / SR 27 / SR 32 in Sterling; I-95 / I-95 BL near Darien; US 17 / SR 25 near Darien; I-95 BL / US 17 / SR 25 in Darien; US 17 / SR 25 in Eulonia
- North end: I-95 / SR 57 in Eulonia

Location
- Country: United States
- State: Georgia
- Counties: Glynn, McIntosh

Highway system
- Georgia State Highway System; Interstate; US; State; Special
← SR 98	→ SR 100

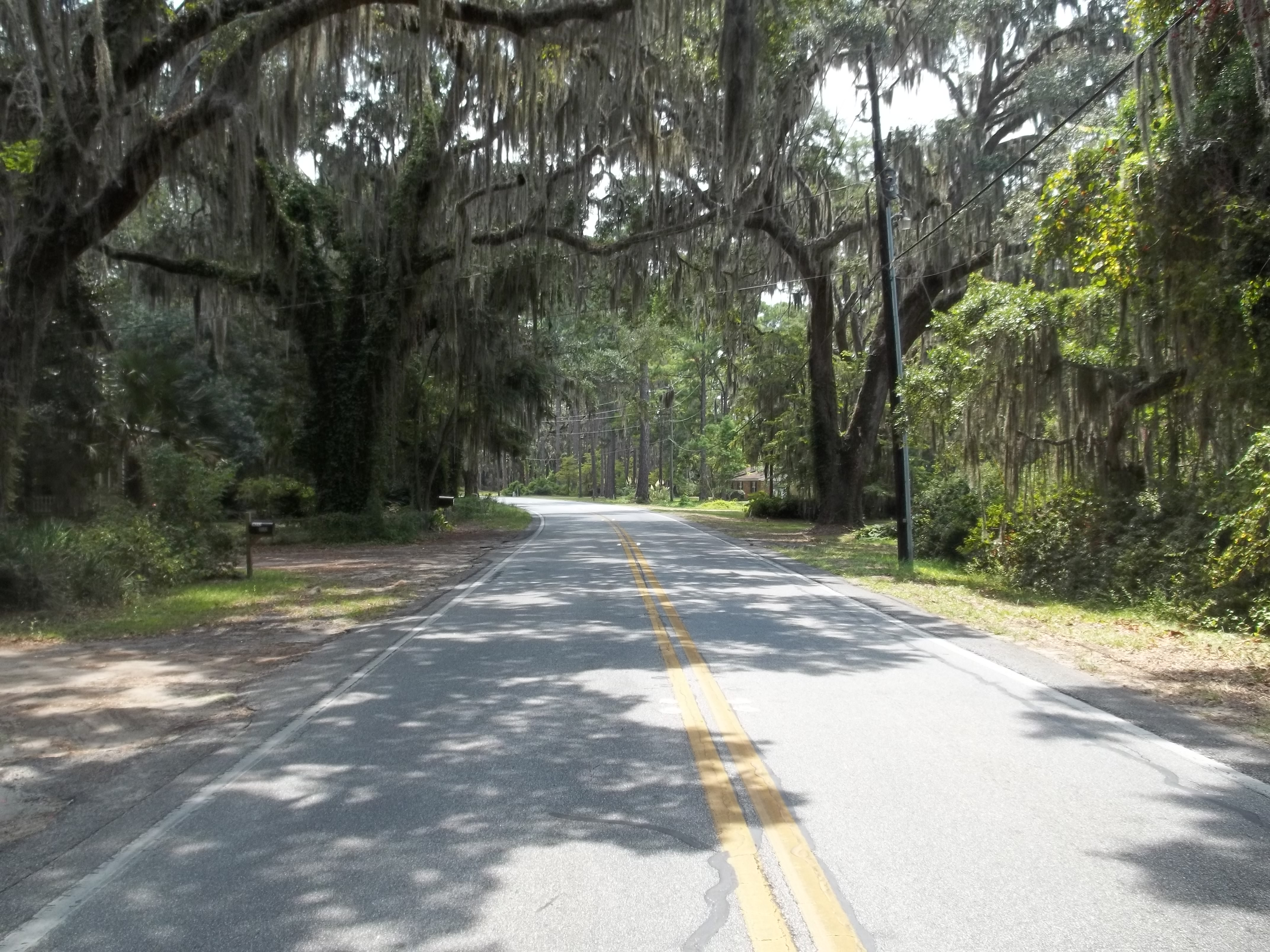
SR 99 in Ridgeville

State Route 99 (SR 99) is a 38.9-mile-long (62.6 km) state highway that travels south-to-north through portions of Glynn and McIntosh counties in the southeastern part of the U.S. state of Georgia. The highway begins at its southern terminus at US 82/SR 520 southwest of Sterling to its northern terminus at I-95 and SR 57 in Eulonia. The Ridge in Ridgeville on SR 99 is listed on the National Register of Historic Places.

== Route description ==
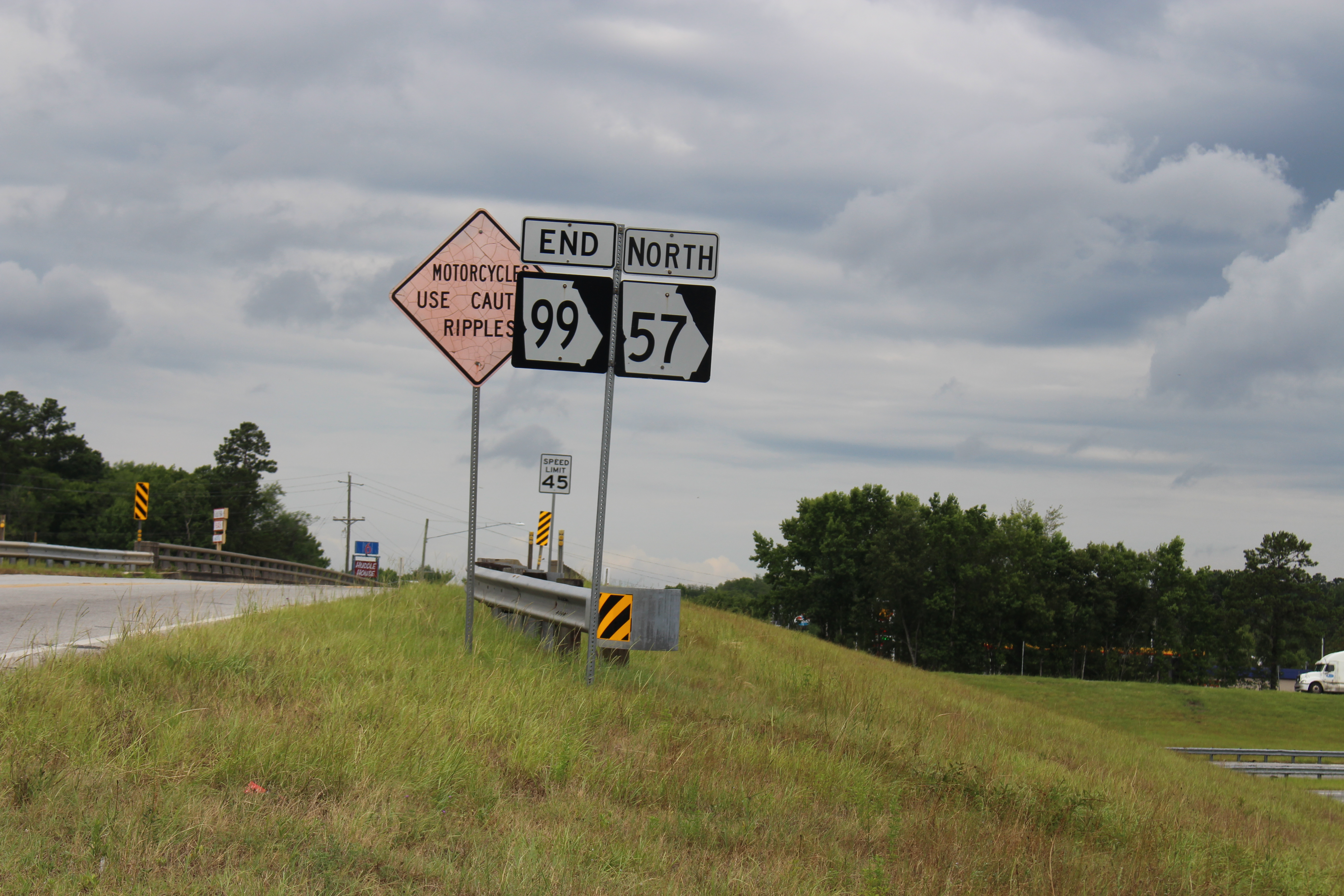
Northern terminus in Eulonia

SR 99 begins at an intersection with US 82/SR 520 in southern Glynn County. The road follows a northeast direction but after the bridge over Fancy Bluff Creek makes a reverse curve to the left before an intersection with SR 32 just west of Sterling. SR 99 travels concurrent with SR 32 for approximately 2 miles (3.2 km) to an intersection with US 25/US 341/SR 27 where SR 32 meets its eastern terminus. SR 99 continues north through rural Glynn County to an intersection of SR 25 Spur south (Golden Isles Parkway), then to a interchange with Interstate 95 (I-95) at exit 42 and on to US 17/SR 25 in northern Glynn County. From there, SR 99 continues concurrent with US 17/SR 25 to Darien in McIntosh County where SR 99 branches off to the east and forms a loop from Darien to Eulonia through several neighborhoods, while closely following the gradient between the trees and marshes. In Eulonia, SR 99 once again intersects US 17/SR 25, where it continues west 1 mile (1.6 km) more to its northern terminus at another interchange with I-95 at exit 58. Continuing westward, the roadway becomes SR 57, which continues west towards Townsend.

== History ==
=== 1920s and 1930s ===
The roadway that would eventually become SR 99 was designated at least as early as 1919 as part of SR 25 from south-southwest of Darien into the city. By the end of 1921, SR 60 was designated from SR 27 in Sterling to SR 25 south-southwest of Darien. Part of SR 27 was designated on the current path of SR 99 southwest of Sterling between intersections with SR 50 and SR 60. Also, SR 23 was designated from SR 25 in Darien to SR 38 in Ludowici. Before 1926 ended, SR 60 was removed from the map. US 17 was designated along SR 25. By the middle of 1932, SR 23 was redesignated as SR 99. Near the end of 1936, SR 131 was designated between intersections with US 17/SR 25 in Darien and Eulonia. A few months later, the southern portion of SR 131 was under construction. About two years later, this portion had a completed hard surface. Also, a small portion just north of it had completed grading, but was not surfaced. In 1939, a southern segment of SR 131 was designated from an intersection with US 84/SR 50 west-northwest of Brunswick to one with SR 32 northwest of Brunswick. Also, a central segment of SR 131 was designated from US 25/US 341/SR 27 southwest of Darien to US 17/SR 25 south-southwest of that city. However, there is no indication if these were separate segments of the highway or extensions Also, the segment from Valona to Eulonia was under construction.

=== 1940s ===
In 1940, the northern terminus of the southern segment was shifted eastward to a southwest–northeast routing. Also, the western terminus of the central segment was shifted south-southwest to connect with SR 32 at US 25/US 341/SR 27 north-northwest of Brunswick. At the same time, an unnumbered road was built between Sterling to a point south-southwest of Darien. At the end of the year, a western segment of SR 99 was designated from an intersection with SR 32 east of Alma, east-northeast to SR 121 north of Bristol, and east to SR 38 southwest of Jesup. The next year, the southern segment was under construction. The central segment was indicated to be "on system–not marked or maintained". The Valona–Eulonia segment of the northern segment had completed grading, but was not surfaced. In 1942, the unnumbered road northeast of Sterling was indicated to be "on system–not marked or maintained". The next year, the entire length of all three segments of SR 131, and the unnumbered road, were redesignated as an extension of SR 99. SR 131 was moved to an alignment from South Newport to east-northeast of it. The entire length of this new segment had a completed hard surface. By the end of 1946, the Darien–Eulonia segment was hard surfaced. Three years later, a small portion southeast of Ludowici was hard surfaced.

=== 1950s to 1980s ===
In 1950, the Eulonia–Townsend segment was hard surfaced. By the end of 1953, the formerly unnumbered road was designated as part of SR 99. Also, the entire Eulonia–Ludowici segment was hard surfaced. Nearly a decade later, the segment from north of Bristol to southwest of Jesup was paved. Between 1960 and 1963, the segment from east of Alma to north of Bristol was paved. Another three years later, the portion concurrent with SR 32 southwest of Sterling was paved. About two years later, all portions of SR 99 were paved. Nearly two decades later, the Eulonia–Ludowici segment was redesignated as part of SR 57, while the portion from east of Alma to southwest of Jesup was redesignated as SR 203.

== Major intersections ==
County	Location	mi	km	Destinations	Notes
Glynn		0	0.0	US 82 / SR 520 – Waynesville, Brunswick	Southern terminus
Glynn	Anguilla	6.8	10.9	SR 32 west – Patterson	Southern end of SR 32 concurrency
Glynn	Sterling	9.8	15.8	US 25 / US 341 / SR 27 – Brunswick, Jesup	Northern end of SR 32 concurrency, Eastern terminus of SR 32
Glynn		13.2	21.2	SR 25 Spur south (Golden Isles Parkway) – Brunswick	Northern terminus of SR 25 Spur
Glynn		15.5	24.9	I-95 (SR 405) / I-95 BL begins – Savannah, Jacksonville	Southern terminus of I-95 Bus.; southern end of I-95 Bus. concurrency; I-95 exit 42
Glynn		16.8	27.0	US 17 south / SR 25 south – Brunswick	Southern end of US 17/SR 25 concurrency
McIntosh	Darien	21.7	34.9	I-95 BL north / US 17 north / SR 25 north – Eulonia	Northern end of I-95 Bus. and US 17/SR 25 concurrencies
McIntosh	Eulonia	37.9	61.0	US 17 / SR 25 – Darien, Midway	
McIntosh	Eulonia	38.9	62.6	I-95 (SR 405) / SR 57 north – Savannah, Jacksonville	Northern terminus of SR 99; southern terminus of SR 57; I-95 exit 58
1.000 mi = 1.609 km; 1.000 km = 0.621 mi: Concurrency terminus

== Future ==
Portions of SR 99 in Glynn County are scheduled to be widened in the coming years due to new developments in northern Glynn County. The interchange with I-95 has been reconstructed to accommodate four through lanes of traffic on SR 99 and by 2030, the 6-mile-long (9.7 km) portion between I-95 and US 341 is scheduled to be widened to a four-lane divided highway. The Georgia Department of Transportation plans to ultimately widen the entire segment between US 17/SR 25 and US 82/SR 520.
