= Georgia State Route 251 =

State highway in Georgia

State Route 251
- SR 251 highlighted in red

Route information
- Maintained by GDOT
- Length: 13.5 mi (21.7 km)
- Existed: 1949–present

Major junctions
- South end: I-95 BL / US 17 / SR 25 north of Darien
- I-95 / I-95 BL northwest of Darien
- North end: SR 57 in Townsend

Location
- Country: United States
- State: Georgia
- Counties: McIntosh

Highway system
- Georgia State Highway System; Interstate; US; State; Special
← SR 250	→ SR 252

State Route 251 (SR 251) is a 13.5-mile-long (21.7 km) south–north state highway located in the east-central part of the U.S. state of Georgia. It travels entirely within McIntosh County.

== Route description ==
SR 251 begins at an intersection with I-95 Bus./US 17/SR 25 just north of Darien. Here, the roadway continues as Dunbar Street. The highway heads northwest, passing the Darien Inland Harbor Campground. It then has an interchange with Interstate 95 (I-95) northwest of the city. Here, I-95 Bus. reaches its northern terminus. Just past I-95 is access to the Preferred Outlets at Darien, an outlet mall. The highway then turns north, traveling through rural areas of the county, until it meets its northern terminus, an intersection with SR 57 in Townsend. Here, the roadway continues as Old Townsend Road.

No section of SR 251 is part of the National Highway System, a system of routes determined to be the most important for the nation's economy, mobility and defense.

== History ==
SR 251 was established in 1949 along an alignment from its current southern terminus north-northwest and then northwest of the city, to what is now the unincorporated community of Cox. In 1955, a short section from Darien to northwest of I-95 was paved. By 1963, the road's entire route was paved. By 1979, the road was moved to, and paved along its current alignment.

== Major intersections ==
The entire route is in McIntosh County.

Location	mi	km	Destinations	Notes
	0.0	0.0	I-95 BL south / US 17 / SR 25 (North Way) / Dunbar Street – Brunswick, Savannah	Southern terminus; southern end of I-95 Bus. concurrency
	1.1	1.8	I-95 (SR 405) / I-95 BL ends – Brunswick, Savannah	Northern end of I-95 Bus. concurrency; northern terminus of I-95 Bus.; I-95 exit 49
Townsend	13.5	21.7	SR 57 / Old Townsend Road – Eulonia, Ludowici	Northern terminus
1.000 mi = 1.609 km; 1.000 km = 0.621 mi
