= Pipe Makers Canal =

Stream in Georgia, U.S.

Coordinates: 32°6′57.74″N 81°10′42.41″W

Pipe Makers Canal is a stream in the U.S. state of Georgia.

According to tradition, the stream was so named from an incident when Native Americans and Indian officials passed the peace pipe here. A variant name is "Pipe Maker's Creek".
