= Colesburg, Georgia =

Unincorporated community in Georgia, United States

Colesburg
- Unincorporated community
- Colesburg, Georgia
- Location in the State of Georgia
- Coordinates: 30°56′36″N 81°41′53″W
- Country: United States
- State: Georgia
- County: Camden
- Elevation: 20 ft (6.1 m)
- Time zone: UTC−5 (EST)
  - Summer (DST): UTC−4 (EDT)
- ZIP code: 31569 (Woodbine)
- Area code: 912
- GNIS feature ID: Populated Place

Colesburg is an unincorporated community located in central Camden County in the U.S. state of Georgia. The settlement is situated inland within the state's Atlantic coastal plain, located immediately southwest of the city limits of Woodbine, the county seat.

== History ==
Colesburg emerged as a small rural settlement during the 19th and early 20th centuries, developing as one of several satellite agricultural and timber-based communities scattered throughout the interior of Camden County. Prior to the American Civil War, the economy of the surrounding central county area was heavily dictated by large riverfront plantations—such as the nearby Fairfield and Bellview estates—cultivating rice and cotton along the Satilla River. Following the collapse of the plantation system in the Reconstruction era, the regional economy transitioned toward industrial logging, naval stores harvesting, and the operation of turpentine stills, which supported local settlements like Colesburg.

During the mid-20th century segregation era, the community operated the Colesburg School, a dedicated black school serving the area's African-American students.

== Geography and Infrastructure ==
Colesburg sits at an approximate elevation of 20 feet (6 m) above mean sea level. Geographically, it is clustered directly south of the Satilla River basin alongside the Clarks Bluff locality.

The community's primary transportation infrastructure includes Colesburg Tompkins Road and Old Jefferson Highway, which link the locality northward to U.S. Route 17 and Woodbine, and southward toward the city of Kingsland.

Colesburg does not maintain an independent municipal government or a dedicated post office. Public infrastructure and civil services are administered by the Camden County Board of Commissioners. Postal services and residential mailing addresses for the community are routed through the post office in nearby Woodbine under the ZIP code 31569.
