= South Newport River =

River in Georgia, United States of America

- Location of mouth

Location
- Country: United States
- State: Georgia

Physical characteristics
- Source
  - location: Georgia
- Mouth
  - coordinates: 31.55467°N 81.19454°W
  - elevation: 0 ft (0 m)
- Length: 42.6 mi (68.6 km)

The South Newport River is a 42.6-mile-long (68.6 km) river on the Atlantic coastal plain in the U.S. state of Georgia. It rises in Long County 3 miles (5 km) south of Walthourville and flows east-southeast, becoming the boundary between Liberty and McIntosh counties. It flows into Sapelo Sound, an arm of the Atlantic Ocean, south of St. Catherines Island.

The river's name most likely is a transfer from Newport, Rhode Island.

== See also ==
- List of rivers of Georgia
