= South Newport, Georgia =

Unincorporated community in Georgia, U.S.

Coordinates: 31°38′06″N 81°23′46″W

South Newport is an unincorporated community in McIntosh County, Georgia, in the U.S. state of Georgia.

== History ==
A post office was in operation at South Newport between 1840 and 1950. The community takes its name from the nearby South Newport River.
