= Townsend, Georgia =

- small town
- Location within Georgia Location within the United States
- Coordinates: 31°32′22″N 81°31′21″W
- Country: United States
- State: Georgia
- County: McIntosh
- Elevation: 20 ft (6.1 m)

Population (2024)
  - Total: 5,800
- Time zone: UTC-5 (Eastern (EST))
  - Summer (DST): UTC-4 (EDT)
- ZIP codes: 31331
- GNIS feature ID: 324263

Townsend is a small town in McIntosh County, Georgia, United States. It lies along State Route 57 northwest of the city of Darien, the county seat. Its elevation is 20 feet (6 m). It has a post office with the ZIP code 31331.

Townsend includes the United States Marine Corps's Townsend Bombing Range, which is an over 34,000 acre area used for combat training by all the U.S. military branches' pilots.

== History ==
A post office called Townsend was established in 1894. The community was named after one Joe Townsend.
