= National Register of Historic Places listings in McIntosh County, Georgia =

This is a list of properties and districts in McIntosh County, Georgia that are listed on the National Register of Historic Places (NRHP).

This National Park Service list is complete through NPS recent listings posted March 21, 2025.

== Current listings ==
	Name on the Register	Image	Date listed	Location	City or town	Description
1	Ashantilly	Ashantilly	August 25, 2015 (#15000103)	15591 GA 99 (actually on Bond Rd. between St. Andrews Cemetery Rd. and Ashantilly Rd.); 31°22′52″N 81°24′47″W	Darien	Home of Thomas Spalding. It is also known as "Old Tabby". Original house built ca. 1820, burned in 1937 and rebuilt. Now houses the Ashantilly Center website announcement^{[usurped]}
2	Behavior Cemetery		August 22, 1996 (#96000915)	S end of Sapelo Island, 1.25 mi W of Hog Hammock; 31°25′43″N 81°16′52″W	Hog Hammock	
3	D'Antignac House		December 16, 1977 (#77001503)	Address Restricted (was on Baisden's Bluff on the Crescent River)	Crescent	Demolished in 2007
4	First African Baptist Church at Raccoon Bluff		September 6, 1996 (#96000916)	E side of Sapelo Island, approximately 2 mi. N of Hog Hammock; 31°28′02″N 81°13′56″W	Hog Hammock	
5	Fort Barrington	Fort Barrington	September 27, 1972 (#72001447)	NW of Cox; 31°28′49″N 81°37′00″W	Cox	The site of Fort Barrington is on private property, no marker there. The marker is 10 miles away, on Georgia highway 57, at the border of McIntosh County and Long County.
6	Fort King George	Fort King George	December 9, 1971 (#71001101)	E of U.S. 17 off Ft. King George Rd, at 302 McIntosh Rd. in Darien; 31°21′55″N 81°24′54″W	Darien	Now a Georgia state historic site
7	Hog Hammock Historic District	Hog Hammock Historic District	September 6, 1996 (#96000917)	E side of Sapelo Island; 31°25′40″N 81°15′38″W	Hog Hammock	
8	The Ridge	The Ridge	April 18, 1985 (#85000863)	Old Shell Rd. GA 99; 31°24′12″N 81°24′13″W	Ridgeville	
9	Sapelo Island Lighthouse	Sapelo Island Lighthouse	August 26, 1997 (#97000335)	S end of Sapelo Island, S of University of Georgia Marine Institute; 31°23′29″N 81°17′08″W	Sapelo Island	
10	Vernon Square-Columbus Square Historic District	Vernon Square-Columbus Square Historic District	March 14, 1985 (#85000581)	Roughly bounded by Market, Trumbull, Rittenhouse and Ft. King George Dr. 31°22′10″N 81°25′55″W	Darien	
11	West Darien Historic District	West Darien Historic District	September 17, 2001 (#01000975)	Bounded by 8th St., US 17, Darien River, and Cathead Creek; 31°22′22″N 81°26′13″W	Darien	
