= Fort Barrington =

- U.S. National Register of Historic Places
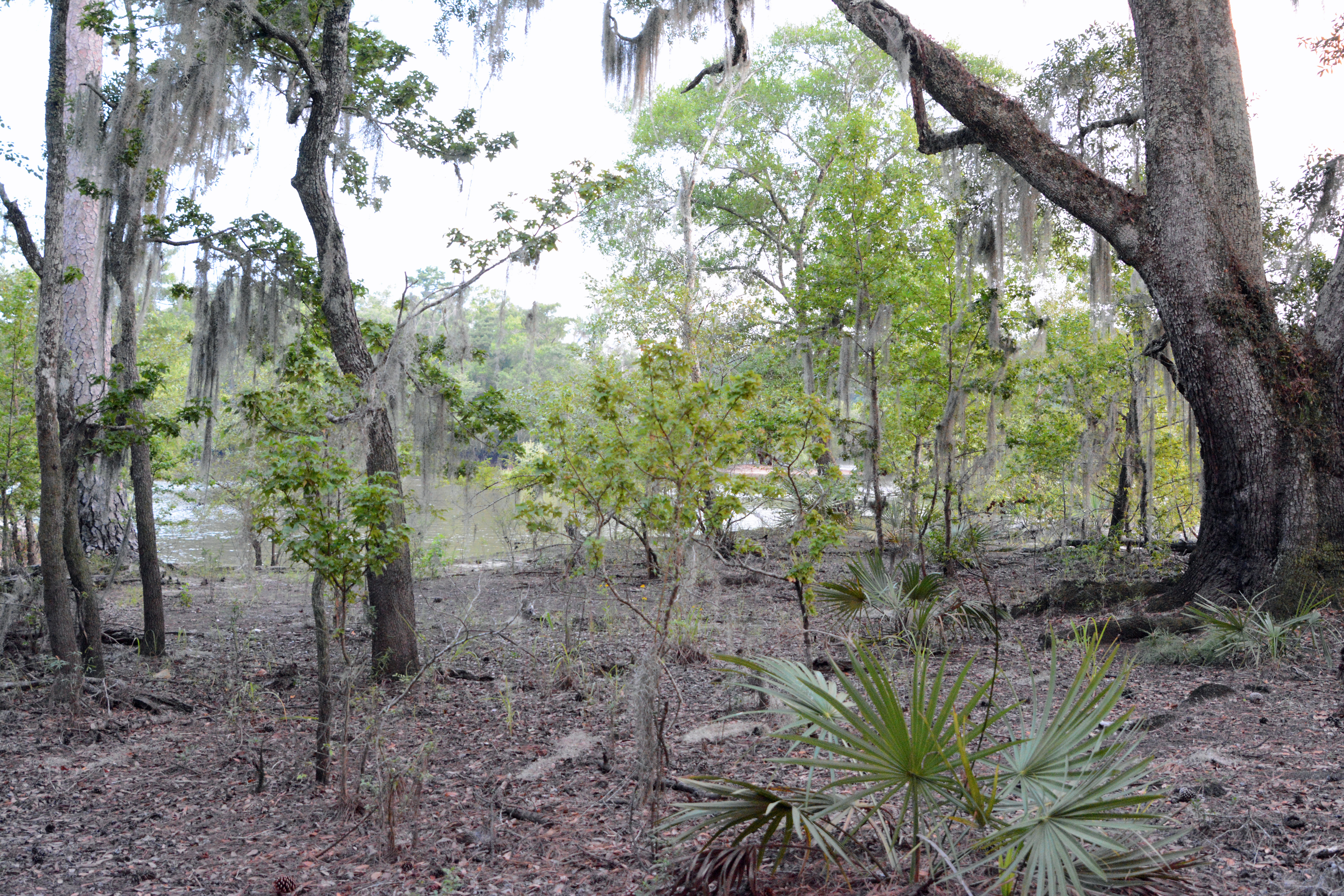
- The site of Fort Barrington

- Location within Georgia Location within the United States
- Nearest city: Darien, Georgia
- Coordinates: 31°28′49″N 81°37′0″W
- Area: 10 acres (4.0 ha)
- Built: 1760
- Built by: Lieutenant Robert Baillie, of the British Empire
- NRHP reference No.: 72001447
- Added to NRHP: September 27, 1972

Fort Barrington, briefly renamed Fort Howe after its capture, was a mid-18th-century frontier fort. It was used and garrisoned for several conflicts, including between the British, Spanish, and Native Americans; during the American Revolution; and during the American Civil War. In the years following, much of the original site has been destroyed by river action. Despite this, it was added to the National Register of Historic Places on September 27, 1972, and is currently held as part of a hunting and fishing club. No archaeological work other than ground reconnaissance has been done.

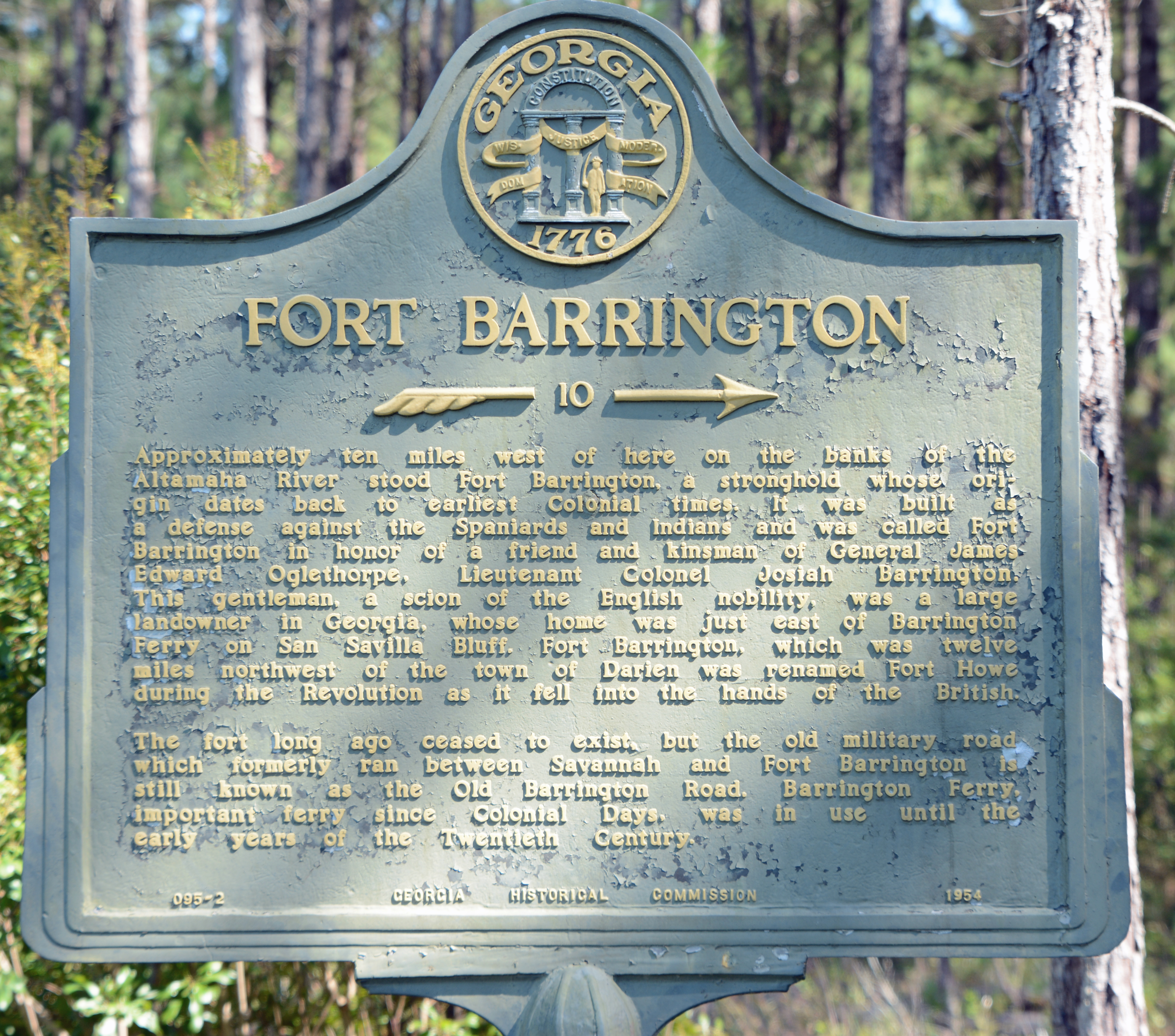
Historical marker 10 miles away, on Georgia Highway 57, at the McIntosh/Long County line

(The 1864 map locates it closer to 31.47166°N 81.61026°W.)

== History ==
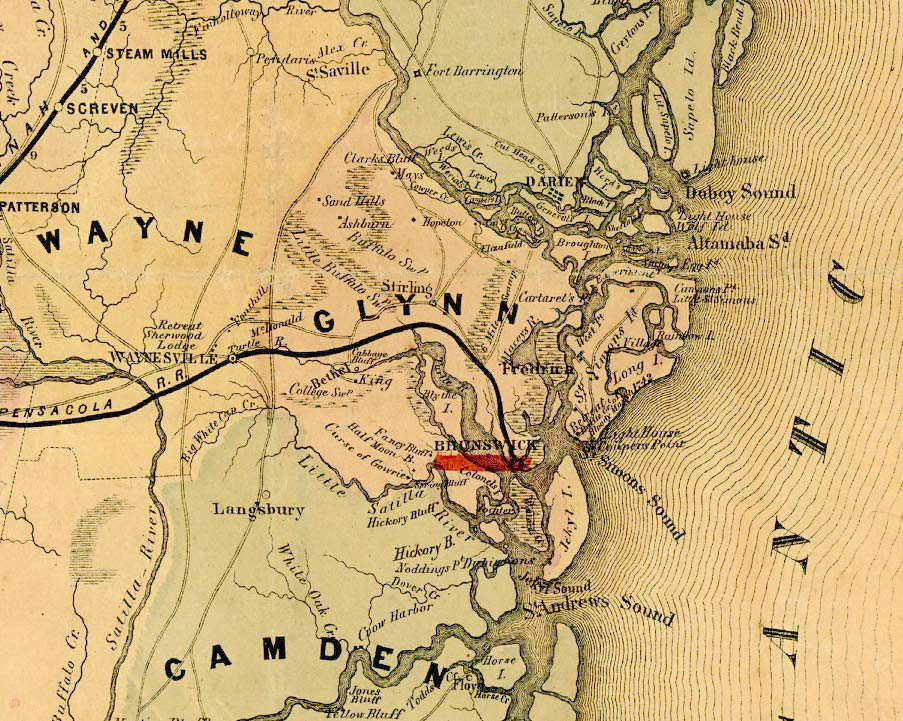
Map from 1864 that shows the location of the fort.

The fort was built in 1751 by British troops under the command of Lieutenant Robert Baillie; its name was chosen in honor of Josiah Barrington, a friend of the lieutenant and relative of James Oglethorpe. It was first stationed by a detachment of the First Troop of British Rangers as one of their defenses against Spanish Florida and Indian raids.

It was later used during the American Revolutionary War as the military headquarters for the American southern theater of operations; it was during this period that it was called Fort Howe. However, it was captured and burned by British forces on March 13, 1778, when Colonel Thomas Brown led his Loyalist company of the King's Rangers in an attack on the fort and took 23 Patriots prisoner. The fort's site was occupied by Confederate forces during the American Civil War.

For over two centuries the site of Fort Barrington was a vital transportation and communication center of major military and political significance. The ferry was used until the early twentieth century, due to the fact that any overland coastal traffic which sought to avoid crossing the four major rivers and swamps of the Altamaha River delta would have to pass just below the site of the fort.

The fort was added to the National Register of Historic Places on September 27, 1972. Today, one can enter the area where the fort once stood down Fort Barrington Road and see a clubhouse, some small structures, moss-draped trees, a sandy beach, and a wooden dock. A historical marker for the site is located on Georgia State Route 57 at the Long County-McIntosh County line. Some evidence of the old fort survives: sand breastworks and two bastions can be made out on the left of the sandy road leading to the hunting and fishing club that now occupies the area.

== Geography ==
The fort was built on the north side of the Altamaha River about 12 miles (19 km) northwest of present-day Darien, Georgia. Its remains are a series of low ridges or embankments at the tip of a narrow peninsula in this location. The "sand hills" of Barrington, as they were called after 1750, had been a major Native American trail for centuries and provided the primary coastal route from Savannah to St. Augustine.

== Design ==
Colonial records state that in 1762, the site was occupied by "a square fort about 75 feet (23 m) each way with a caponier in it and barracks." It was a stockaded structure with a large central blockhouse, a well, a storeroom, a magazine, and barracks. The fort had bastions at the eastern and southern corners, the latter being at the river's edge, and ramparts in the form of a low ridge or embankment extending in a straight line for roughly 150 yards (140 m) between bastions.

== See also ==
- National Register of Historic Places listings in McIntosh County, Georgia
- Fort King George
- Fort St. Andrews
