= Behavior Cemetery =

Historic African American cemetery in Georgia

- U.S. National Register of Historic Places
- Location within Georgia Location within the United States
- Nearest city: Hog Hammock, Georgia
- Coordinates: 31°25′43″N 81°16′52″W
- Area: 4 acres (1.6 ha)
- Built: before 1898
- NRHP reference No.: 96000915
- Added to NRHP: August 22, 1996

Behavior Cemetery is a historic cemetery on Sapelo Island outside Hog Hammock, Georgia. The cemetery is located at the south end of Sapelo Island, 1.25 miles west of Hog Hammock, about 300 feet (91 m) off of Airport Road.

== History ==
The African-American cemetery is believed to date to before the American Civil War although the earliest marker is dated to the late 19th century. Originally the cemetery was associated with a former community named "Behavior" and of the people enslaved by Thomas Spalding.

An example of African-American burial grounds, the cemetery's grave markers include short posts at either end of the graves with epitaphs on wooden boards nailed to the surrounding trees and personal items included with the deceased. More recent tombstones are cement, granite or metal. As of 2019, the cemetery is still in use and the only cemetery associated with the African American community on Sapelo Island.

The age of the cemetery is unknown, but there was damage recorded from the October 2, 1898 hurricane.

It was added to the National Register of Historic Places on August 22, 1996.

In June 2010, professors and students from University of Tennessee at Chattanooga conducted a survey of the cemetery. Their work and excavations showed evidence of over 180 unmarked graves and at least two structures, one likely a cabin for the enslaved people.

== See also ==
- National Register of Historic Places listings in McIntosh County, Georgia
