= Cornelia Walker Bailey =

Storyteller, writer and historian

- Born: June 12, 1945; Sapelo Island, Georgia
- Died: October 15, 2017 (aged 72); Brunswick, Georgia
- Occupations: Historian, Storyteller, and writer
- Known for: Gullah Activist

Cornelia Walker Bailey (June 12, 1945 – October 15, 2017) was a storyteller, writer, and historian who worked to preserve the Geechee-Gullah culture of Sapelo Island, Georgia.

== Early life ==
Bailey was born on June 12, 1945, to Hicks Walker and Hettie Bryant. She was a descendant of Bilali Muhammad, an enslaved person and a Muslim from West Africa, who worked on Thomas Spalding's plantation. Bilali Muhammad was born sometime between 1760 and the 1770s in Timbo, Guinea. He was 14 when he was captured in tribal warfare, enslaved and taken to Nassau, Bahamas, where white planter Thomas Spalding purchased him and took him to Sapelo Island in 1803. By 1810, he oversaw all activities on the plantation, including 500 enslaved persons. He also brought the earliest known Islamic text to the Americas through his capture, a 13-page document of Muslim law and prayer written in the early 19th century.

Bailey's father, Hicks Walker, often worked for tobacco heir R.J. Reynolds Jr. at Reynolds' mansion on Sapelo Island. The mansion had been the centerpiece of Thomas Spalding's plantation.

Bailey grew up in the settlement of Belle Marsh on Sapelo Island, one of many communities that traced their heritage back to freed slaves who purchased land on the isolated island.

== Career ==
Bailey left Sapelo Island briefly to live with family on St. Simons Island, then settled in Hog Hammock on her return to the island in 1966. Bailey ran a guest house there, The Wallow Lodge, with her husband Julius "Frank" Bailey and their seven children.

She took pride in her heritage, which she described specifically as Saltwater Geechee. She worked to preserve and document Geechee-Gullah stories and ways of life in the face of a dwindling population and increasing real estate development – a trend bringing wealthy white people to build large vacation homes on the historically black island. She taught crafts she herself had learned from her father: basket weaving, cast net knitting, herb collecting, and midwifery. She was known locally as a griot, a storyteller and unofficial historian of Sapelo Island.

Bailey traveled to Sierra Leone in 1989, where she investigated the links between Sapelo Island and West African traditions. She noted similar forms of vernacular architecture, as well as similar agricultural techniques and cooking styles.

Bailey served as vice president of the Sapelo Island Cultural and Revitalization Society, which she co-founded in 1993 with Inez Grovner. They began organizing Sapelo Island Cultural Days, held annually in October, which aimed to bring in tourists and generate income to help preserve the community.

=== Writing ===
Her first book, the memoir "God, Dr. Buzzard, and the Bolito Man: A Saltwater Geechee Talks About Life on Sapelo Island, Georgia," was written with Christena Bledsoe and published in 2000. The book collects stories about her own childhood, as well as tales about her ancestors and the history of Sapelo Island.

Bailey was one of the authors, with Ray Crook, Norma Harris, and Karen Smith, of "Sapelo Voices: Historical Anthropology and the Oral Traditions of Gullah-Geechee Communities on Sapelo Island, Georgia", published in 2003 by The State University of West Georgia. In the book, which collects oral history interviews that were conducted in 1992, she asks questions of the island's elders and joins them in reminiscences of the ways of the past.

=== Agricultural revival ===
Bailey worked with cuisine revivalists to bring Purple Ribbon sugarcane, a strain close to extinction, to Sapelo Island. They planted it on her farm in Hog Hammock as well as at Dr. Bill Thomas and Jerome Dixon's Georgia Coastal Gourmet Farms in nearby Shellman Bluff. Its first yield – 50 gallons of Sapelo Purple Ribbon Sugarcane Syrup – was harvested just after her death in late 2017.

Bailey and her family worked with Georgia Coastal Gourmet Farms to cultivate Sapelo Red Peas, Sapelo's first commercial crop, and brought their first harvest to market in 2014. She had a wide network of academics, scientists, and chefs who supported her work with farming and food, including food historian David Shields, geneticist Stephen Kresovich, chef Linton Hopkins, and chef Sean Brock.

=== Legacy and honors ===
In 2004, she received a Governor's Award in the Humanities for her cultural preservation work. Bailey died on October 15, 2017, in Brunswick, Georgia, at the age of 72.
