= Ridgeville, Georgia =

Unincorporated community in Georgia, US

Coordinates: 31°24′22.81″N 81°24′5.36″W

Ridgeville is an unincorporated community in McIntosh County, in the U.S. state of Georgia.

== History ==
A post office called Ridgeville was established in 1891, and remained in operation until 1964. An old variant name was "The Ridge".

In 1985, Ridgeville's historic district known as "The Ridge" was inscribed on the National Register of Historic Places.
