= Fort St. Andrews =

British fort in Georgia, United States

- Cumberland Island, Georgia
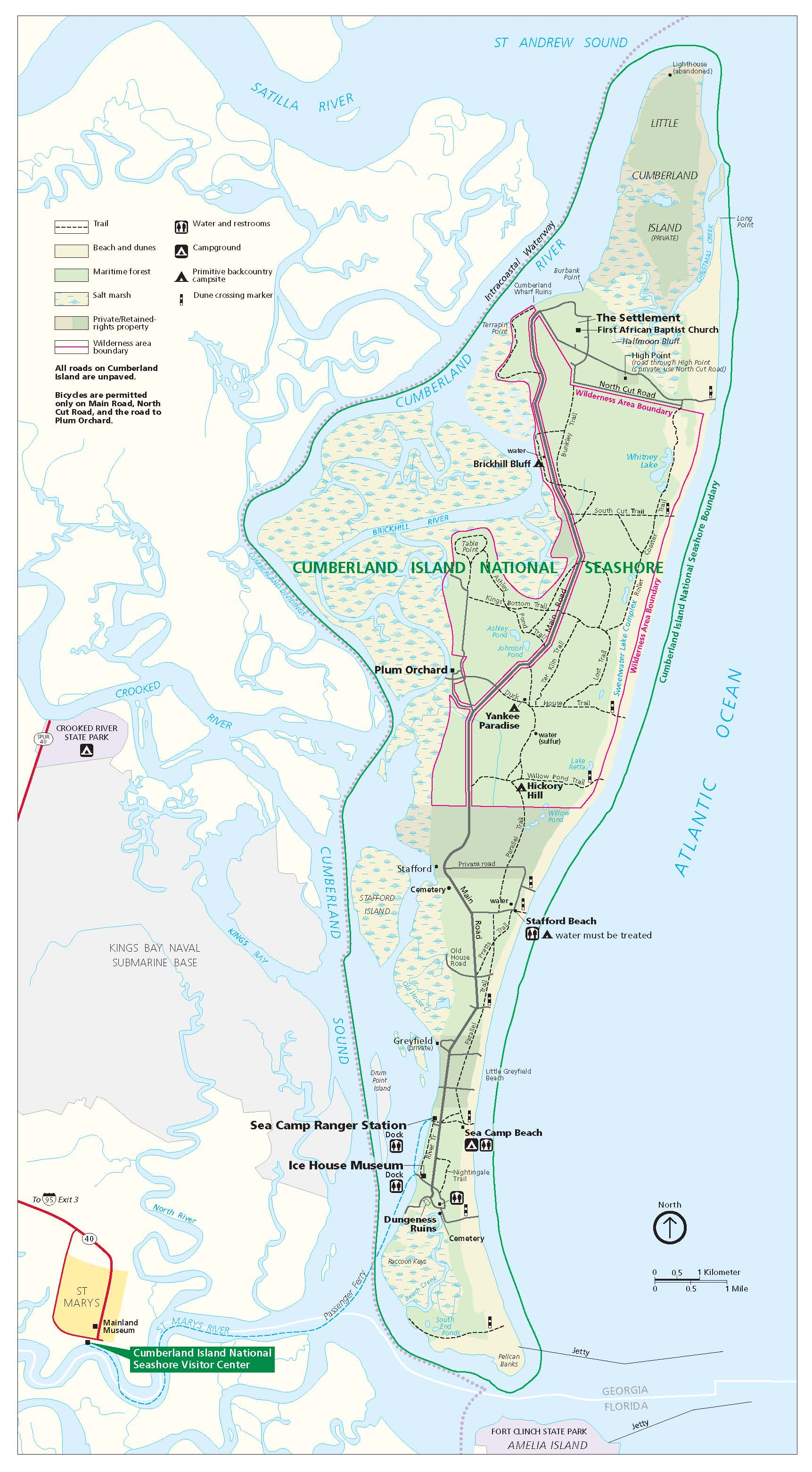
- Map of Cumberland Island (note the fort would have been located on North West part of the island near Terrapin Point).

Site information
- Type: Coastal defense fortification

Location
- Location within Georgia
- Coordinates: 30.925735°N 81.451188°W

Site history
- Materials: Earthen, Palisade
- Battles/wars: Invasion of Georgia (1742)

Fort St. Andrews was a British colonial coastal fortification built on Cumberland Island, Georgia, in 1736. The fort was built by the British as part of a buffer against Spanish Florida and the colonies to the north. The fort was abandoned and later destroyed by the Spanish in mid-1742.

== Background ==
In 1732, General James Oglethorpe led the colonization of Georgia for Great Britain and chose Savannah as the principal port for the colony. The establishment of the colony had been an issue of contention between Britain and Spain since its foundation. The Spanish claimed the territory for its own colony of Florida and disputed what it regarded as an illegal occupation by the British settlers. The building of Fort Frederica on St. Simons Island (near the mouth of the Altamaha River) in 1736 marked the beginning of General Oglethorpe's defensive plan for Georgia. His thinking was influenced heavily by Georgia's maritime geography, which was primarily an uninterrupted series of coastal barrier islands that formed a natural water route, known as the inland passage, offering protection from unpredictable weather and the harsh conditions of the open sea.

== History ==
Fort St. Andrews was built in 1736 on the northern end of Cumberland Island, at what is now known as Terrapin Point, facing the inland passage. It was built in a star work configuration, in the form of a four-pointed star. The star design helps prevent a dead zone in the fort's defense. The fort was about 65 feet (19.8 m) by 130 feet (39.6 m). A palisade triangular water battery, which was designed to attack incoming ships at the waterline, was located at the base of the hill; it was connected to the main fort by a covered passage. A second battery was located on the western side of the island to protect the approach through the inland waterway. Troops were quartered in a nearby village of huts named Barrimacke. Of the regiment of 700 soldiers sent to the colony in 1738, Oglethorpe posted 200 men at Fort St. Andrews and a smaller company (perhaps 50 or 60 men) on the southern end of Cumberland Island. The main purpose was to protect Darien and Frederica to the north.

In 1738 a newly arrived British regiment attempted to mutiny. This was set off by the primitive living conditions and the failure to pay the extra remuneration normally given for a sea voyage. General Oglethorpe led the officers in regaining control.

When the War of Jenkins' Ear broke out in 1739, Spain began drawing up plans for an invasion. Spanish governor Don Manuel de Montiano commanded the invasion force and invaded Georgia in 1742. Separated from the main Spanish invasion fleet, about 15 ships were located at Cumberland Island and were sheltered off the coast near the fort in St. Andrew Sound in June 1742. General Oglethorpe ordered the fort abandoned and a retreat south to Fort William. In July, when the Spanish forces retreated after the Battle of Bloody Marsh, they camped at the abandoned fort on their return trip to Florida and burned it down. Afterward, a company of British rangers was stationed at the ruins of the fort for several years, but it was never rebuilt.

== See also ==
- Province of Georgia
- James Oglethorpe
- Cumberland Island
- Invasion of Georgia (1742)
- Fort King George
