= First African Baptist Church at Raccoon Bluff =

Historic church in Georgia, United States

- U.S. National Register of Historic Places
- Location within Georgia Location within the United States
- Nearest city: Hog Hammock, Georgia
- Coordinates: 31°28′0″N 81°13′57″W
- Area: less than one acre
- Built: c.1899-1900
- Architectural style: Late Gothic Revival
- NRHP reference No.: 96000916
- Added to NRHP: September 6, 1996

The First African Baptist Church at Raccoon Bluff is a historic church on Sapelo Island, Georgia. The church was built in c.1899-1900 and is the last surviving remnant of the Raccoon Bluff community, once the largest community on Sapelo Island. It was added to the National Register of Historic Places in 1996.

The congregation was founded in 1866 and was the only church congregation on Sapelo Island until 1884. Its church was at Hanging Bull, on the west side of the island. That church was destroyed by the hurricane of October 2, 1898, and residents of Hanging Bull dispersed. The congregation then built this church at Raccoon Bluff c.1899-1900, using lumber washed up on the shore from the hurricane.

Due to pressure to consolidate population of Sapelo Island only in Hog Hammock, so that the rest of the island could be a hunting preserve, the congregation shifted its worship to Hog Hammock in 1963. In 1968 the congregation built a new church there, the First African Baptist Church.

In 2000, the First African Baptist Church at Raccoon Bluff was restored. by Sapelo Island residents, the state of Georgia, and students from the Savannah College of Art and Design.
