= D'Antignac House =

Historic house in Georgia, United States

- U.S. National Register of Historic Places
- Location within Georgia Location within the United States
- Nearest city: Crescent, Georgia
- Coordinates: 31.5098°N 81.3631°W
- Area: 4.5 acres (1.8 ha)
- Built: c.1790
- Architectural style: Federal
- NRHP reference No.: 77001503
- Added to NRHP: December 16, 1977

The D'Antignac House near Crescent, Georgia, United States, was a historic house built c. 1790, when George Washington was president, that is listed on the National Register of Historic Places.

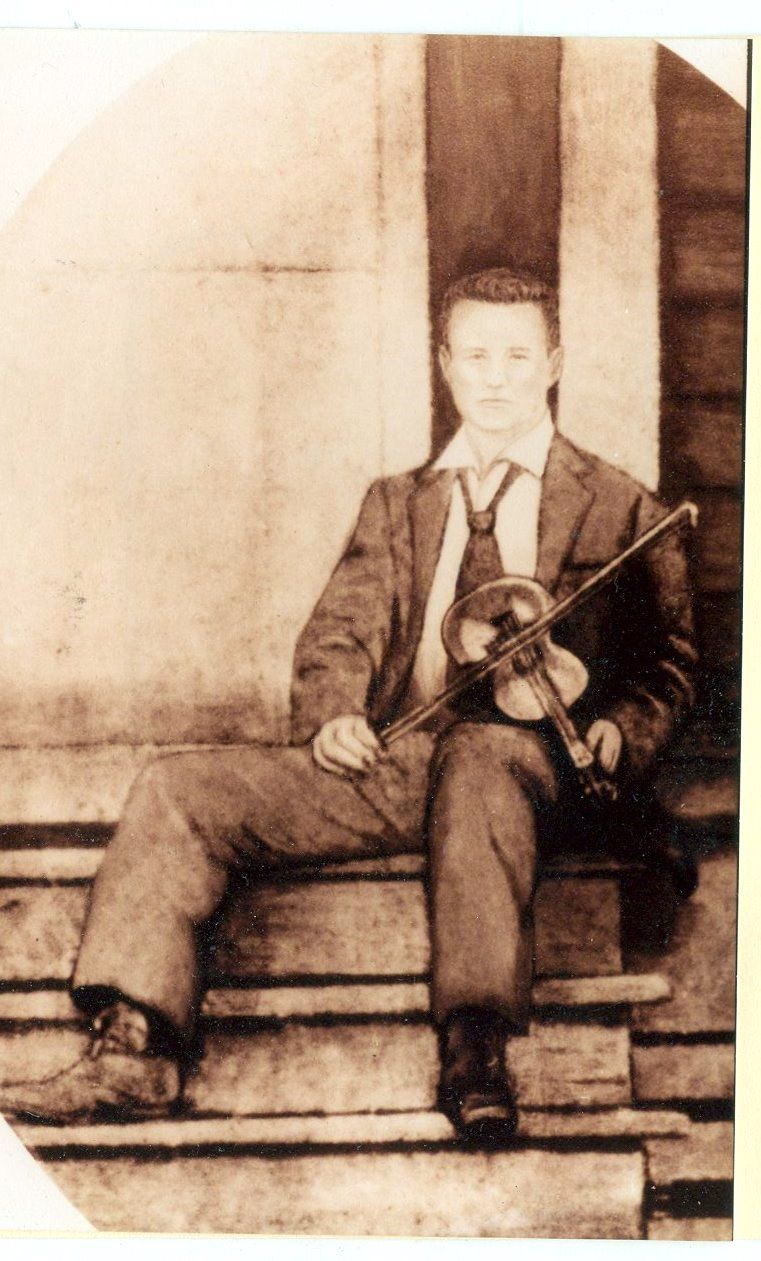
James A. LaRoche, steps of the D'Antignac House

It was a Federal style raised coastal cottage.

It was demolished without warning to neighbors or anyone else on the night of July 8–9, 2007, and the property was listed for sale at $5,175,000. The property had been rezoned to allow development on the property with condition that the historic house be preserved.
