= The Ridge (Ridgeville, Georgia) =

Historic house in Georgia, United States

- U.S. National Register of Historic Places
- U.S. Historic district
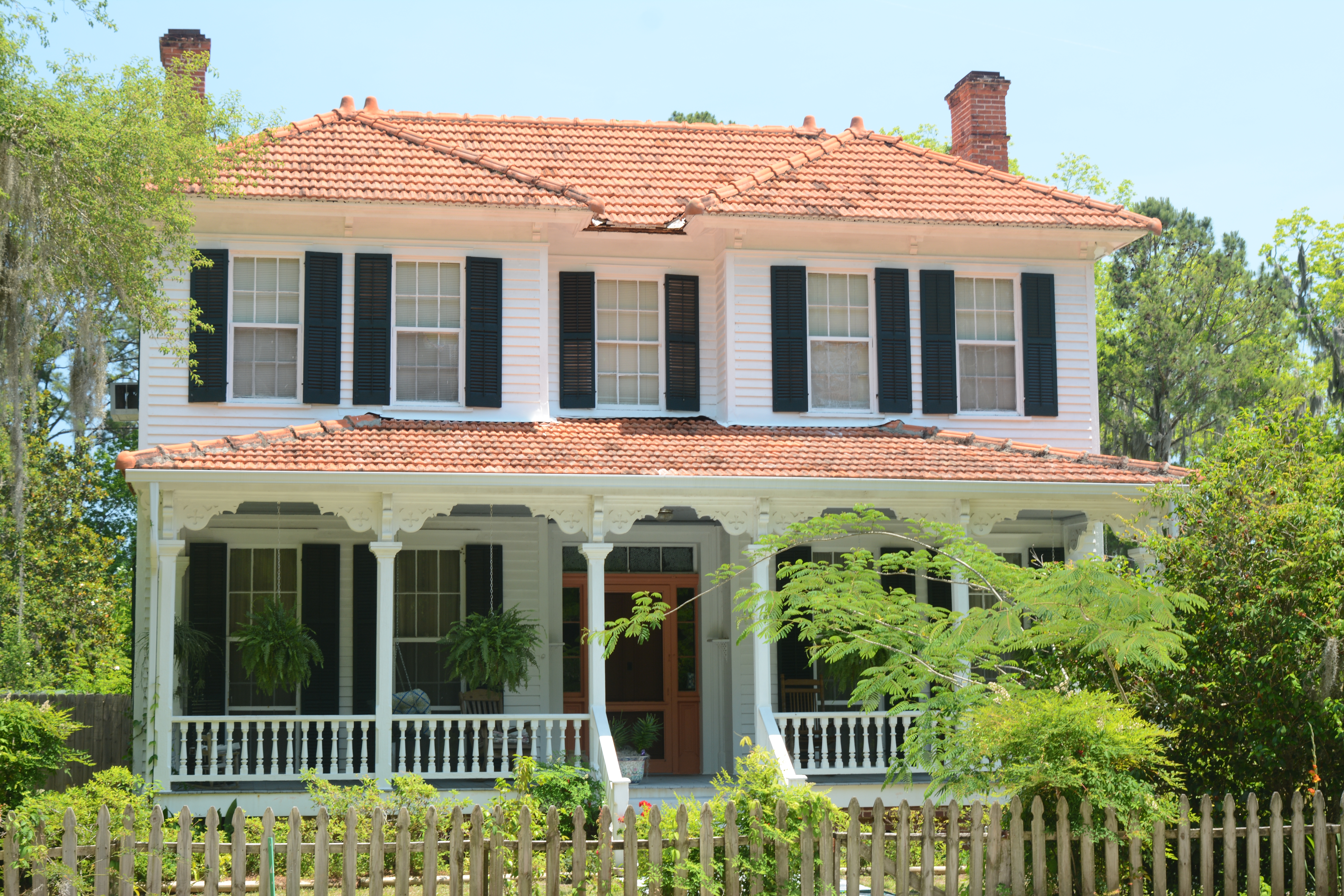

- Location within Georgia Location within the United States
- Location: Old Shell Rd. (GA 99), Ridgeville, Georgia
- Coordinates: 31.403333°N 81.403611°W
- Area: 125 acres (51 ha)
- Architect: Multiple
- Architectural style: Late Victorian
- NRHP reference No.: 85000863
- Added to NRHP: April 18, 1985

The Ridge, in Ridgeville, Georgia, is an unincorporated community located along Georgia SR 99, approximately three miles northeast of Darien, Georgia, and was listed on the National Register of Historic Places in 1985.

The historic district embraces a community on a ridge overlooking salt marshes, on both sides of the Old Shell Road (Georgia State Route 99). It includes two Italianate houses plus other residences with Greek Revival, Eastlake, and Victorian Eclectic architecture.
