= Hog Hammock, Georgia =

- Hogg Hummock Historic District
- U.S. National Register of Historic Places
- U.S. Historic district
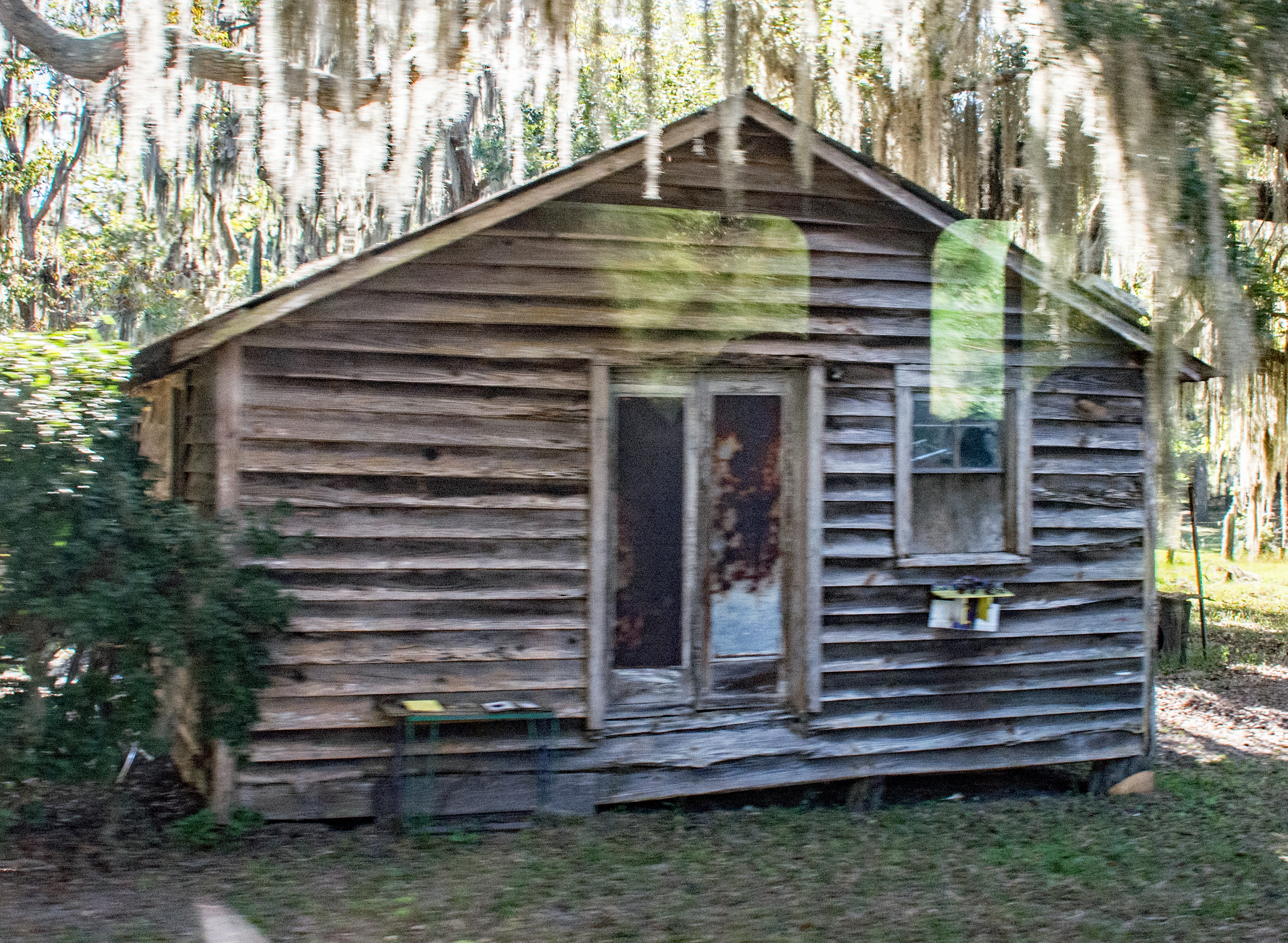
- A historic structure in Hog Hammock

- Location within Georgia Location within the United States
- Location: E side of Sapelo Island, Hog Hammock, Georgia
- Coordinates: 31.4238°N 81.2626°W
- Area: 427 acres (173 ha)
- Built: 1878
- NRHP reference No.: 96000917
- Added to NRHP: September 6, 1996

Hog Hammock is an African-American community on Sapelo Island, a barrier island of the U.S. state of Georgia. The island is near the port of Darien, Georgia about 45 miles (72 km) south of Savannah.

The entire 427-acre (173 ha) community was listed on the National Register of Historic Places in 1996 as Hog Hammock Historic District. In 1996 it included 59 contributing buildings, 16 contributing structures, and five contributing sites as well as 47 non-contributing buildings such as trailer homes.

Its principal historic resources are about 50 one-story historic homes that are all small and simple vernacular buildings, most covered with weatherboard and some by board and batten or other siding.

== Demographics ==
Many of the full-time inhabitants of the Hog Hammock community, also known as Hogg Hummock, are African Americans known as Gullah-Geechees, descendants of enslaved West African people brought to the island in the 1700s and 1800s to work on island plantations. The current population of full-time Gullah-Geechee residents in the community is estimated to be 47 (2009).

== Buildings ==
Hog Hammock store and Post Office, Sapelo Island

The community includes homes, a general store, bar, public library, and other small businesses including vacation rentals. There are two active church congregations in Hog Hammock: St. Luke Baptist Church, founded in 1885, and First African Baptist Church, established in 1866. The latter congregation has an older building known as First African Baptist Church at Raccoon Bluff, constructed in 1900 in the former Raccoon Bluff community north of Hog Hammock. It is used for special services and programs.

Hog Hammock also is the site of Hog Hammock Public Library, founded by SICARS in 2002. The library became a separate organization in 2006, and was rededicated as a member of Three Rivers Regional Library System, based in Jesup, Georgia. The library is in a former two-room schoolhouse. It has more than 2,500 cataloged materials, including the Sapelo Island Heritage Collection.

The residents must bring all supplies from the mainland or purchase them in the small store on the island. The children of Hog Hammock take the ferry to the mainland and then take a bus to school, as the island school closed in 1978.

== Sapelo Island Cultural and Revitalization Society ==
The Sapelo Island Cultural and Revitalization Society, Inc. (SICARS) is a non-profit organization whose mission is to preserve and revitalize the Hogg Hummock Community. SICARS was founded in 1993 by Sapelo Island resident and non-resident descendants including Cornelia Walker Bailey.

The founding members wanted to enhance the future of their community by educating all visitors to the island about the history and to increase awareness that Sapelo has existed as an African community for over 200 years. SICARS was incorporated in 1994. The organization hosts a Cultural Day festival every third Saturday in October.

== History ==
In the 1990s, mainlanders began acquiring parcels of land from the Gullahs to construct vacation homes. In 2012, McIntosh County property tax appraisers notified Hog Hammock residents of huge property tax increases, even though there was no longer a school on the island.

One Hog Hammock property owner's annual tax bill soared from $600 to $2,100. In 2013, a fight over the sudden tax hikes was well underway, with some residents claiming they would be driven from land they had owned for many generations for the benefit of mainlanders who would acquire more of Hog Hammock's homes. In 2022, the county settled the case, freezing some residents' property taxes until 2025, and with the county responsible for improving emergency services and road maintenance.

In September 2023 by a 3 to 2 vote, McIntosh County, which is 65 percent white, weakened zoning restrictions, more than doubling the maximum size permissible for Hog Hammock homes. The commission chair said the island's changing culture is due to Gullahs who sold their land.
