= North River (Darien River tributary) =

- Location of mouth

Location
- Country: United States
- State: Georgia

Physical characteristics
- Mouth
  - location: Atlantic Ocean
  - coordinates: 31°24′05″N 81°20′45″W
  - elevation: 0 ft (0 m)

The North River is a tidal river channel, approximately 18 miles (29 km) long, in coastal Georgia, the United States. It is a longer and narrower alternative channel to the tidal Darien River and ultimately is part of the Altamaha River system in the marshes between Darien, Georgia and the Atlantic Ocean.

== See also ==
- List of rivers of Georgia
- Darien River (Georgia)
- South River (Darien River)
