= St. Cyprian's Episcopal Church (Darien, Georgia) =

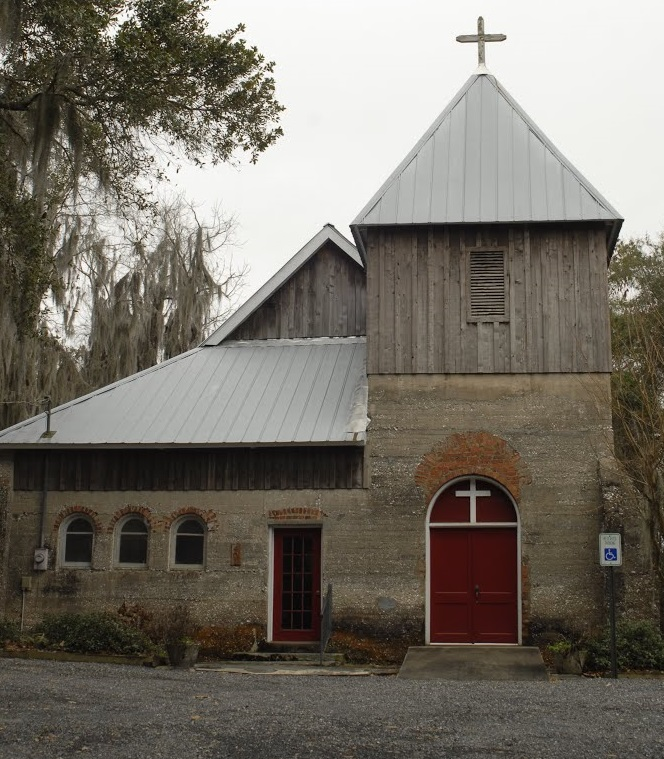
- St. Cyprian's Episcopal Church

Religion
- Affiliation: Episcopal Church
- District: Episcopal Diocese of Georgia
- Ecclesiastical or organisational status: Parish
- Leadership: The Rev. Ted H. Clarkson, Rector

Location
- Location: Fort King George Drive Darien, Georgia, United States of America 31305
- Interactive map of St. Cyprian's Episcopal Church
- Coordinates: 31.36820°N 81.43213°W

Website
- Saint Andrew's and Saint Cyprians Church

St. Cyprian's Episcopal Church in Darien, Georgia is a historic church. It was built for former slaves of the area. It is one of the few African-American Episcopal in the state of Georgia and is part of the Episcopal community of Mcintosh County.

== History ==
Late in 1873, the Rev. James Wentworth Leigh, Dean of Hereford Cathedral in England, held services for former slaves at the plantation on Butler's island, just south of Darien, Georgia. The services for the freed slaves continued on Mr. Butler's property. Twenty-two people were confirmed by Bishop Beckwith in 1874. Around 1875, the parishioners asked Father Leigh to hold services in Darien as well, and the same year members of the church began construction of the present-day St. Cyprian's church which was constructed of tabby. The land was donated by Frances Kemble Butler Leigh, the wife of Father Leigh. Many benefactors from England and from the North in the United States provided funds to help build the church. It was completed and consecrated in 1876 and named for Cyprian of Carthage, a martyred African saint. It is believed that the church is largest tabby structures still in use in Georgia.

Except for a few notable exceptions, St. Cyprian's has traditionally been served by the clergy of St. Andrew's Church. However, from 1892 through 1914, the church was under the direction of the Rev. Ferdinand M Mann, an African-American priest. It was during this time that the church established a school for the education of African-American children in Darien. It served the community for many years. The building suffered major damaged from the hurricane of 1896 and by another storm in 1898, but the building was repaired and the members continued to worship. Today the Church is part of the Episcopal community of Mcintosh County and is under the guardianship of St. Andrew's Episcopal Church.

== See also ==
- Darien, Georgia
- St. Andrew's Episcopal Church (Darien, Georgia)
