= West Darien Historic District =

Historic district in Georgia, United States

- U.S. National Register of Historic Places
- U.S. Historic district
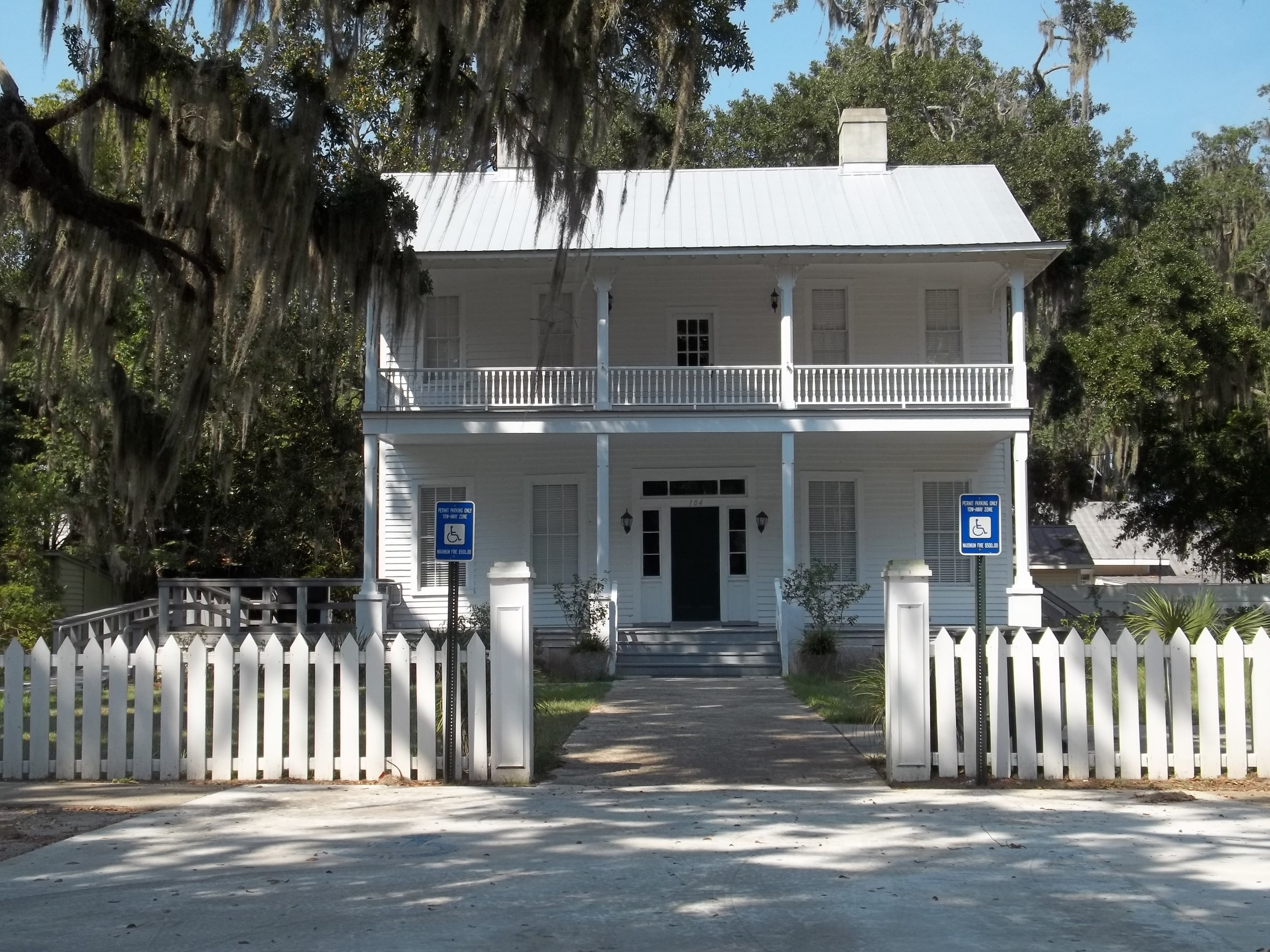

- Location within Georgia Location within the United States
- Location: Bounded by 8th St., US 17, Darien River, and Cathead Creek, Darien, Georgia
- Nearest city: Darien, Georgia
- Coordinates: 31°22′22″N 81°26′13″W
- Area: 94 acres (38 ha)
- Architect: Laine, George W.
- Architectural style: Colonial Revival, Bungalow/craftsman
- NRHP reference No.: 01000975
- Added to NRHP: September 17, 2001

The West Darien Historic District is a historic district in Darien, Georgia. It was added to the National Register of Historic Places (NRHP) on September 17, 2001.

== History ==
Darien was founded in 1736 about 1 mile from Fort King George, which was built in 1721. Darien was directly protected by Fort Darien, built in 1736. The current streets were laid out in an 1806 plan. The town was mostly destroyed in 1863 when it was burned by Union troops. Rebuilding the town started on the east side, followed by the west side. The east side of historic Darien is in the NRHP Vernon Square-Columbus Square Historic District. As of 2001, only one antebellum structure remained; otherwise the oldest buildings are from 1870 to 1910. The district includes 143 contributing buildings and eight contributing sites.

== Archaeology ==
The district contains a number of archaeological sites that were the subject of two studies in 1978 and 1983 as part of construction projects. These studies yielded both prehistoric and antebellum artifacts.

== Photos ==
Contributing buildings

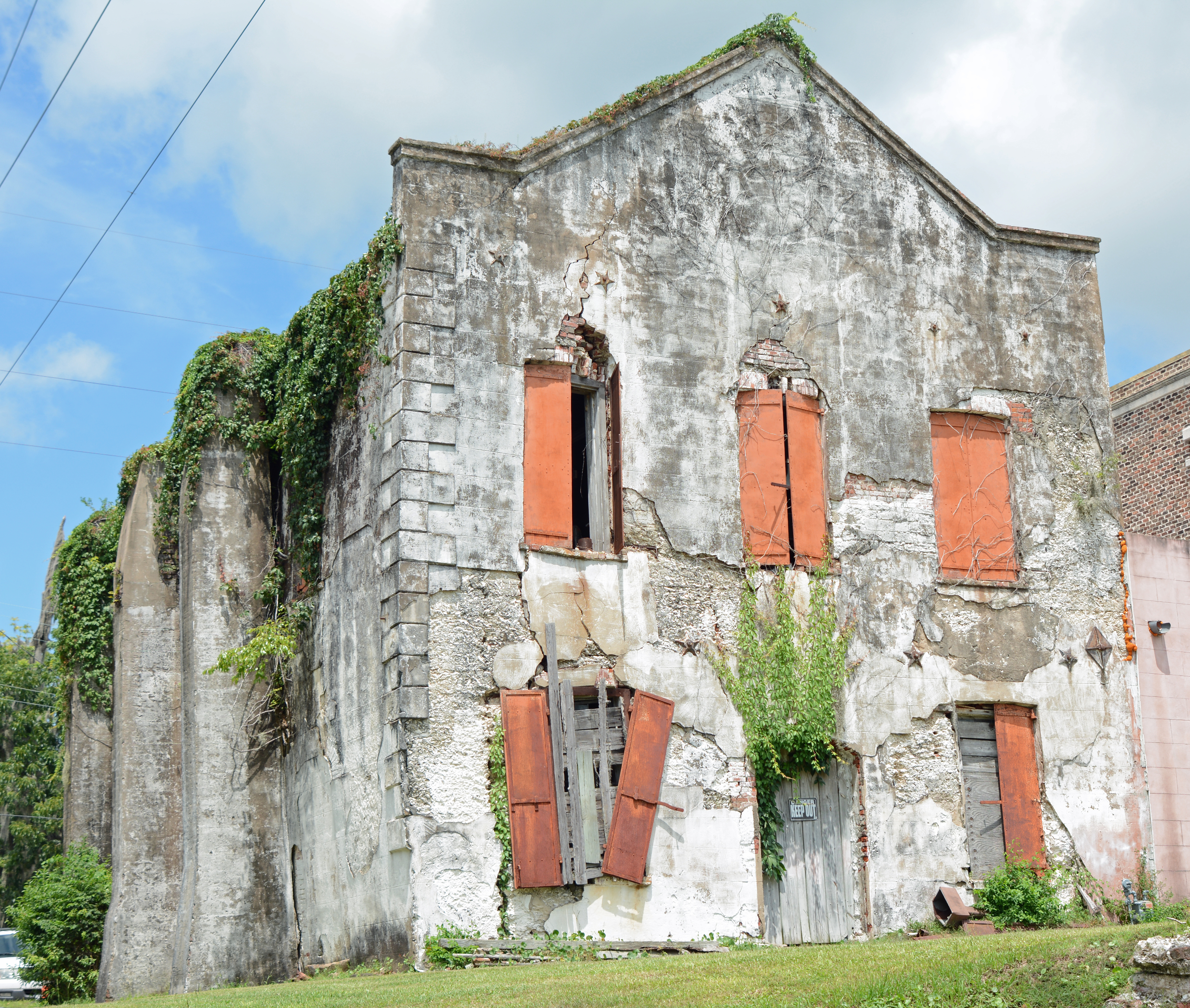
Adam Strain building at Broad and Screven, the only existing building that survived the 1863 burning of Darien by the US Army

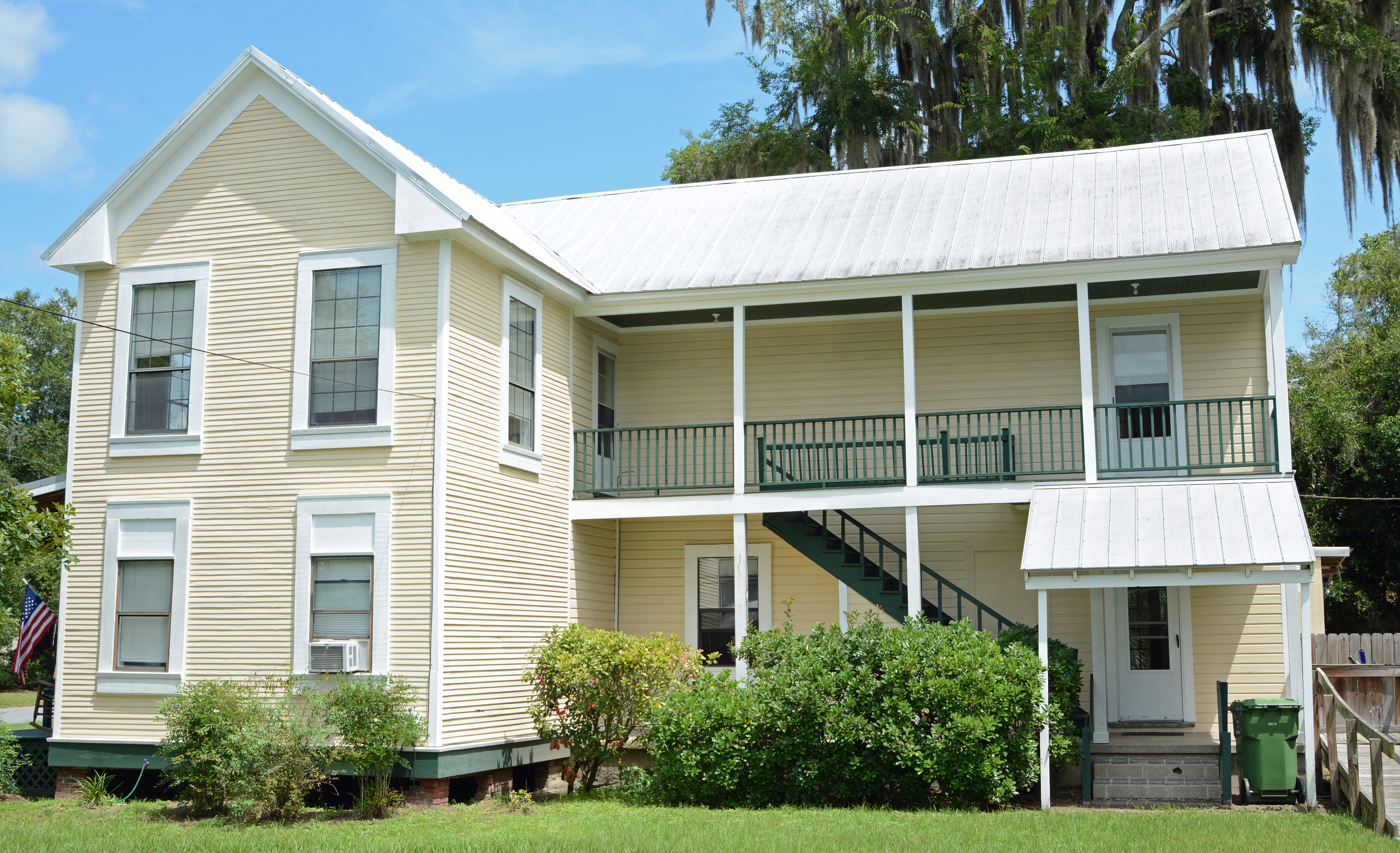
House at 3rd and Clark

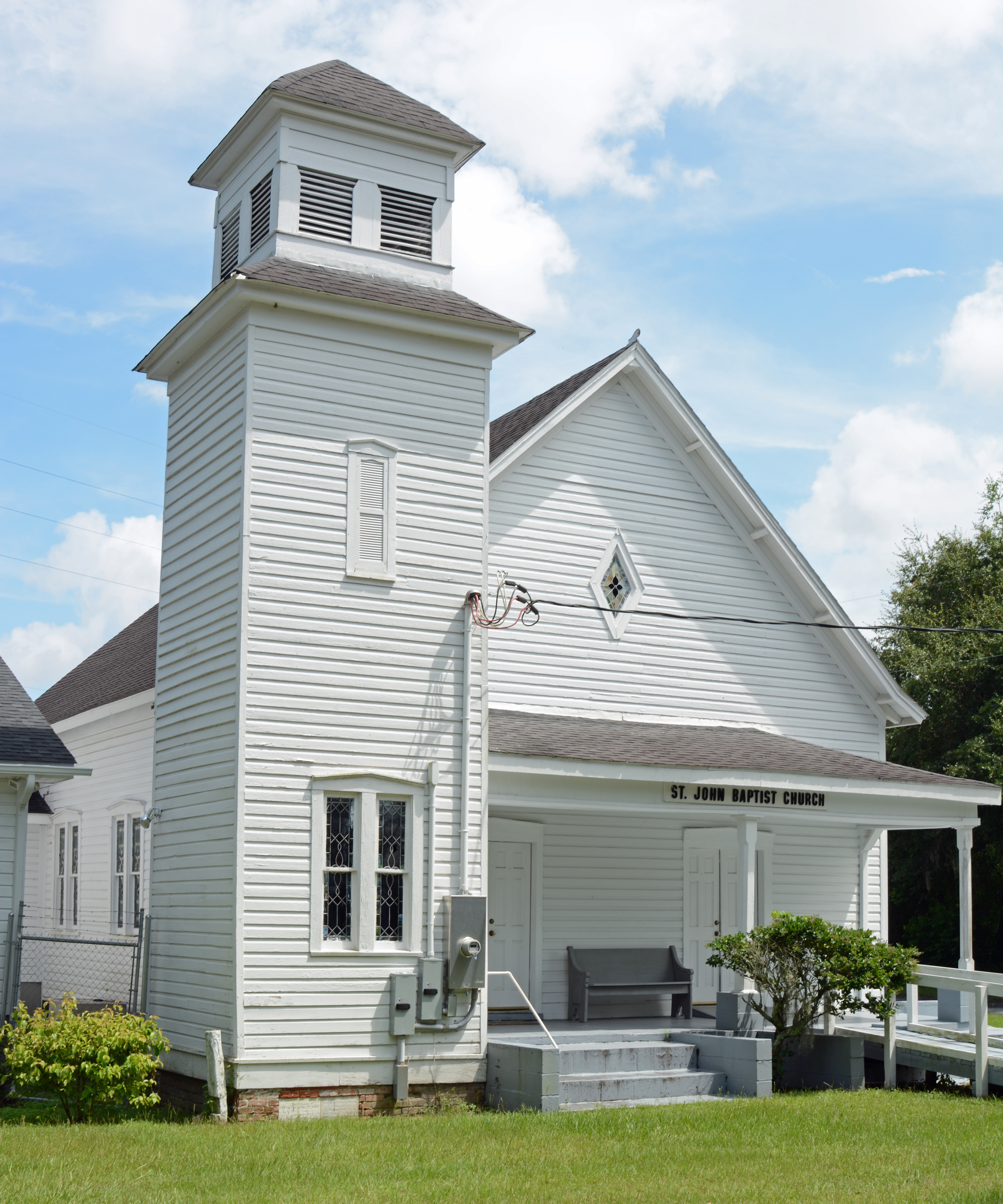
St. John Baptist Church

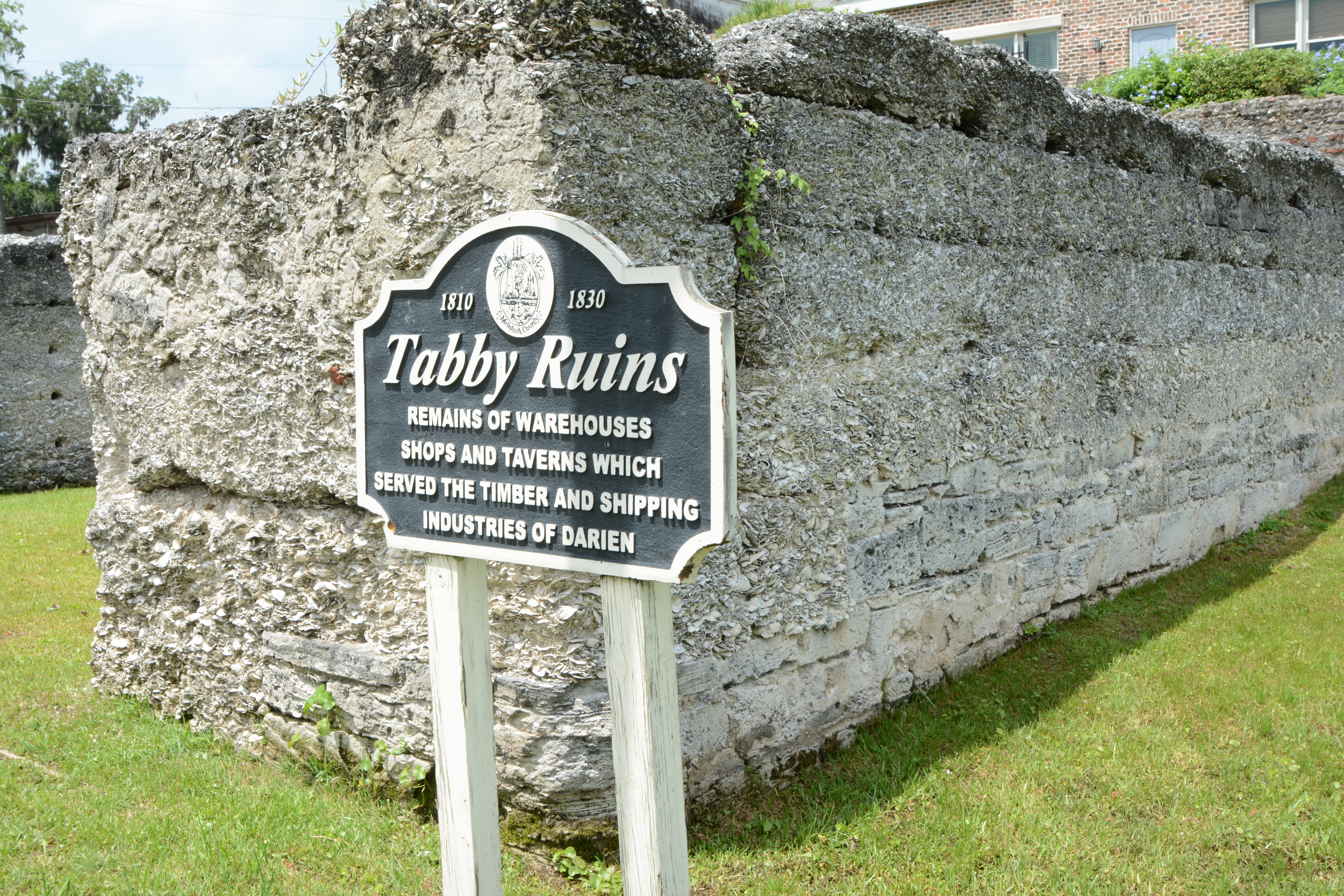
Tabby ruins near the Darien River

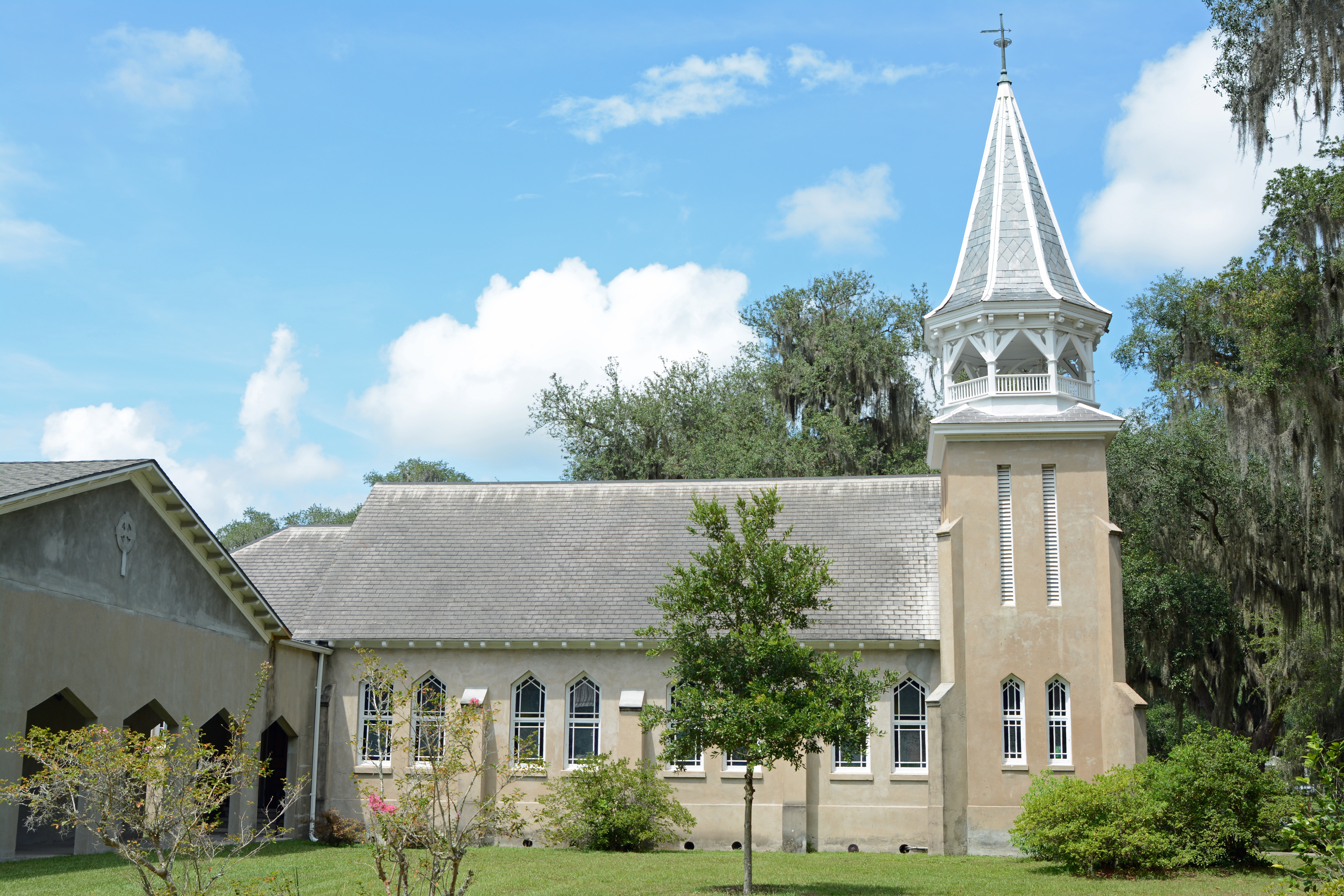
First Presbyterian Church, built in 1900

== See also ==
- Vernon Square-Columbus Square Historic District
