= Darien River (Georgia) =

River in the state of Georgia, United States of America

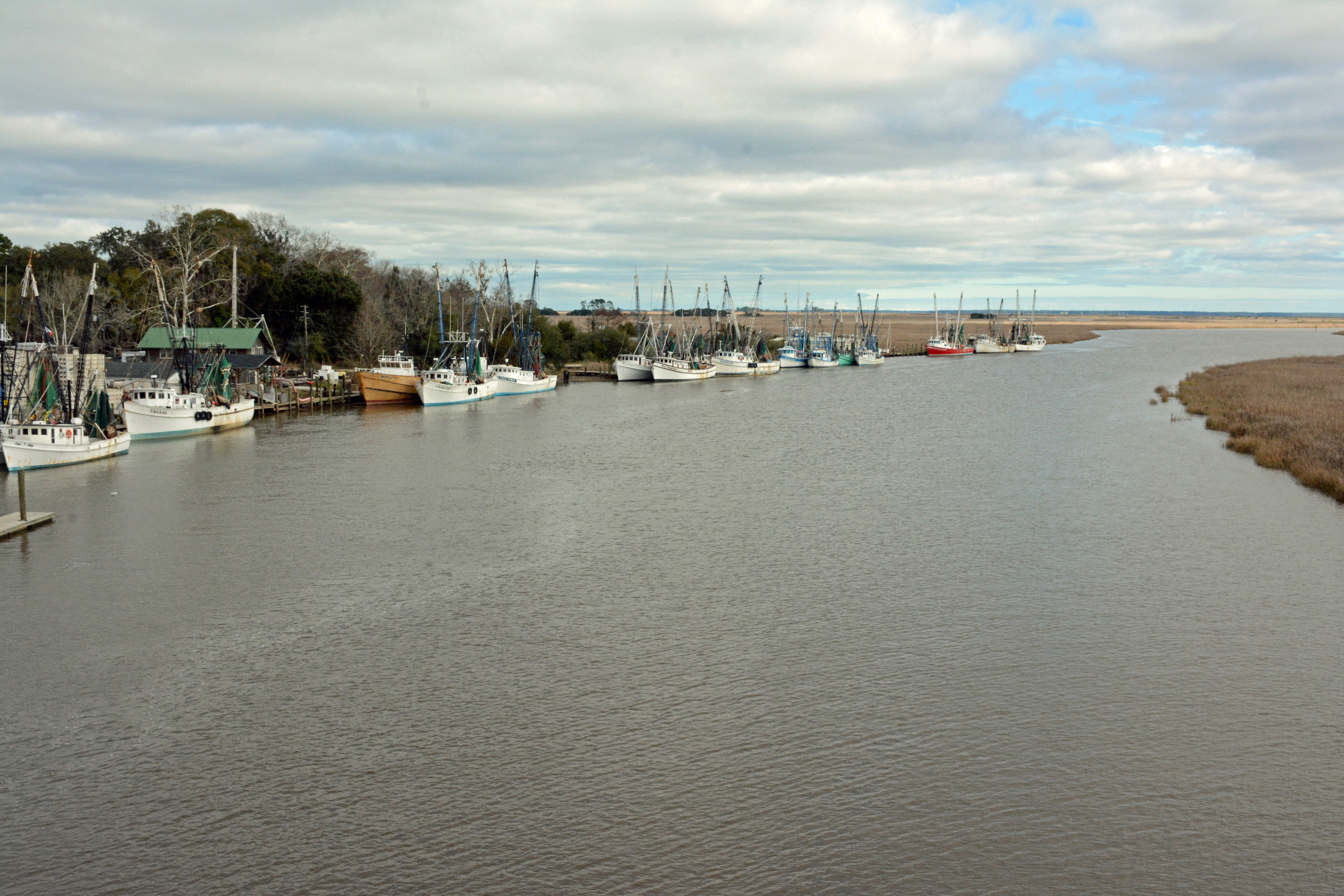
- The Darien River in McIntosh County, Georgia, U.S. The city of Darien is to the left.

- Location of mouth

Location
- Country: United States
- State: Georgia

Physical characteristics
- Source
  - location: Georgia
- Mouth
  - coordinates: 31.36634°N 81.36399°W
- Length: 10 mi (16 km)

The Darien River is a 10-mile-long (16 km) tidal river in the U.S. state of Georgia, in the vicinity of the city of Darien. The river is part of the extensive complex of salt marshes surrounding the mouth of the Altamaha River.

== See also ==
- List of rivers of Georgia
- North River (Darien River)
- South River (Darien River)
