= South River (Darien River tributary) =

Tidal channel in McIntosh County, Georgia, in the United States

- Location of mouth

Location
- Country: United States
- State: Georgia

Physical characteristics
- Source
  - location: Georgia
- Mouth
  - coordinates: 31°22′02″N 81°18′35″W
- Length: 3.2 mi (5.1 km)

The South River is a 3.2-mile-long (5.1 km) tidal channel in McIntosh County, Georgia, in the United States. It connects the Darien River to its west with Doboy Sound, an arm of the Atlantic Ocean, to its east. It flows through an extensive saltmarsh complex, with Queens Island to the north and Wolf Island to the south.

== See also ==
- List of rivers of Georgia
- Darien River (Georgia)
- North River (Darien River)
