= Vernon Square–Columbus Square Historic District =

Historic district in Georgia, United States

- U.S. National Register of Historic Places
- U.S. Historic district
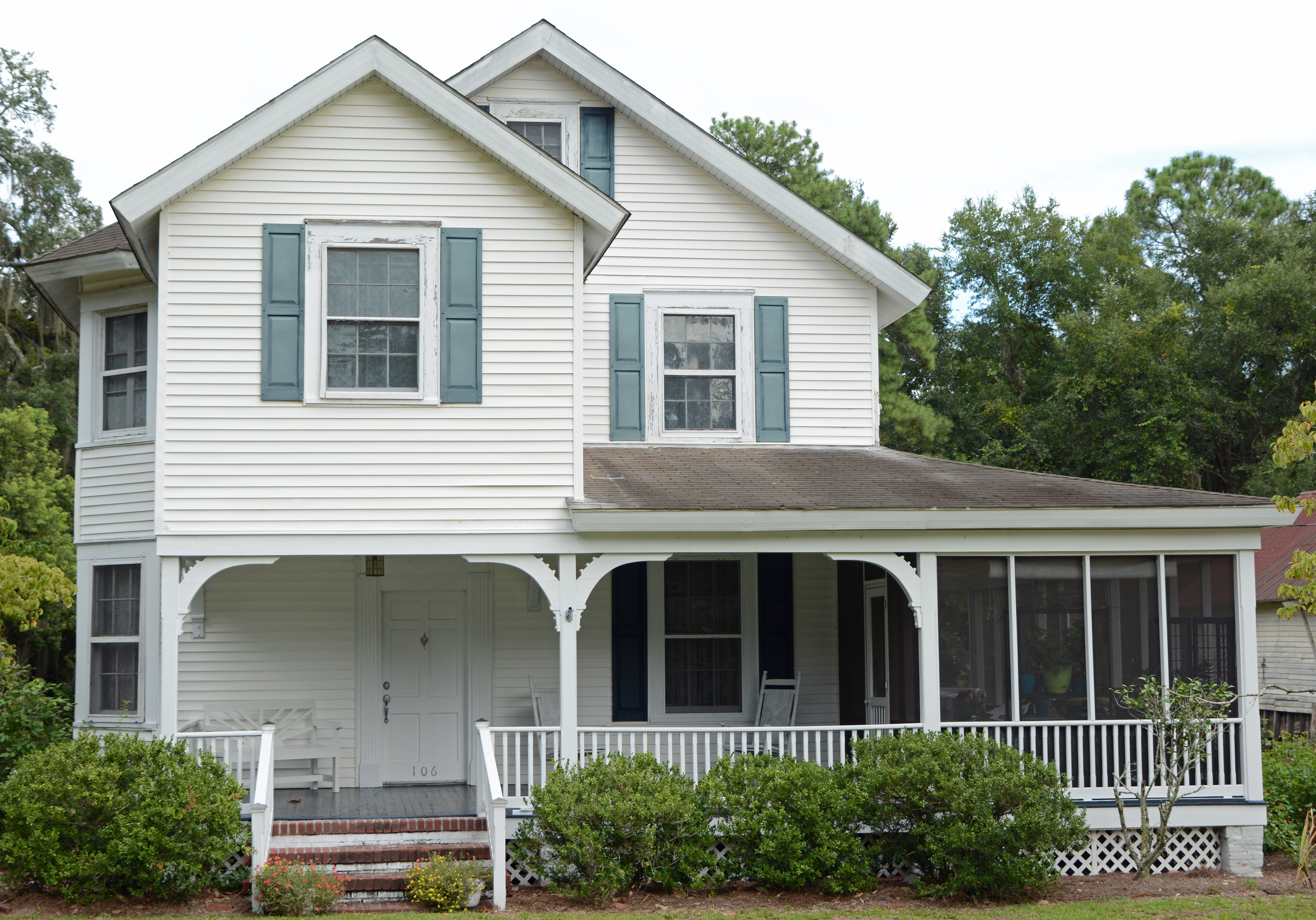
- House at Green and Franklin

- Location within Georgia Location within the United States
- Location: Roughly bounded by Market, Trumbull, Rittenhouse and Ft. King George Dr., Darien, Georgia
- Area: 45 acres (18 ha)
- Architect: Multiple
- Architectural style: Mid 19th Century Revival, Late 19th And 20th Century Revivals, Late Victorian
- NRHP reference No.: 85000581
- Added to NRHP: March 14, 1985

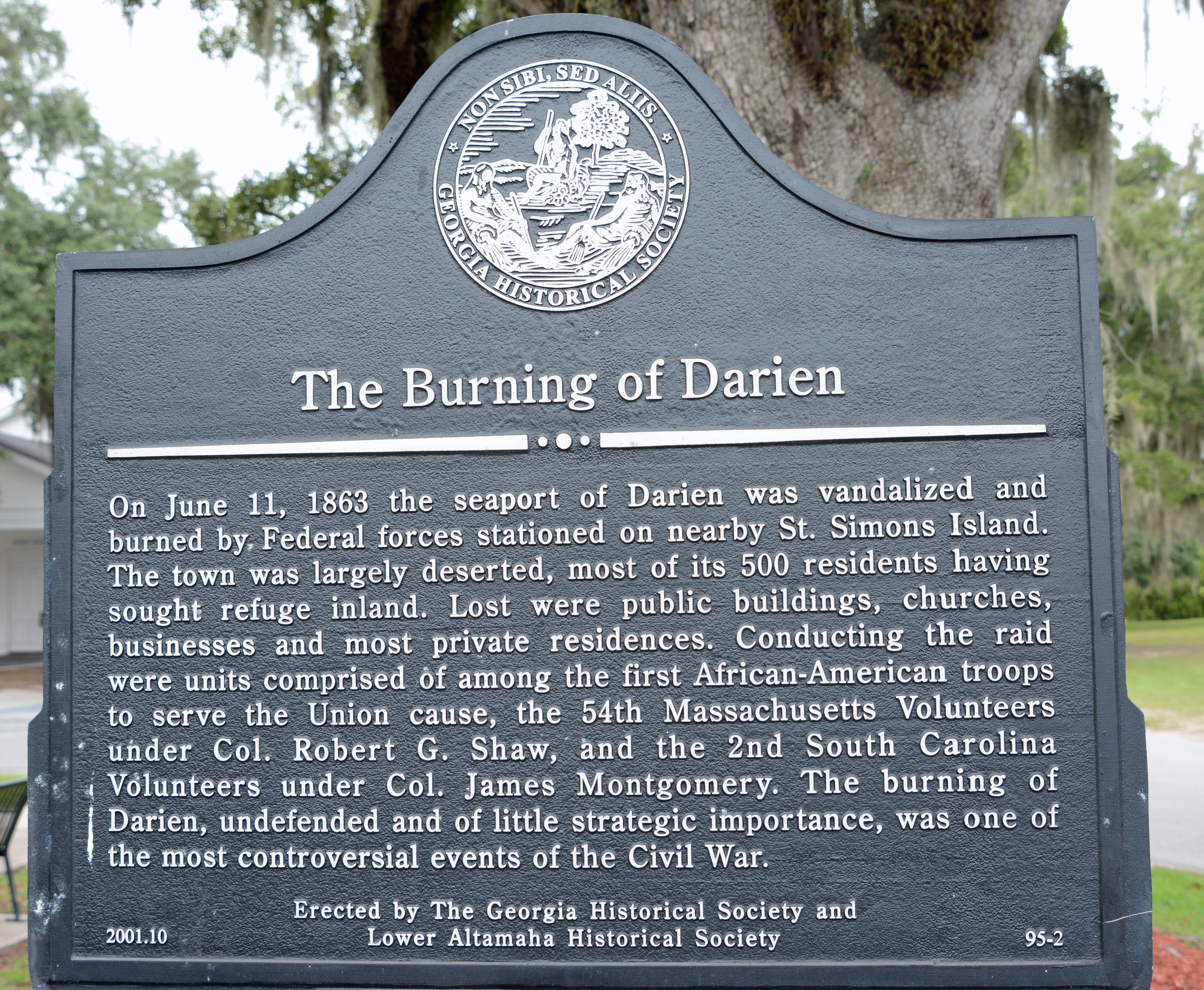
Historical marker discussing the burning of Darien

The Vernon Square–Columbus Square Historic District is a historic area on the eastern side of Darien, Georgia. It encompasses two squares of the original 1805 city plan, although Vernon Square now contains a circular street. The plan was derived from James Oglethorpe's plan for Savannah. The area of Vernon and Columbus Wards was platted in 1805. The historic buildings in the area date back to the mid-19th and early 20th centuries. The houses are mostly modest wood-framed structures with weatherboard siding and wood detail.

== History ==
The area thrived as a center of the timber industry in the late 19th century. The area contains houses representing Darien's middle-class white and black families. Darien had an unusually large group of middle-class black families in the late 19th century. McIntosh County frequently had a black representative to the state legislature from 1868 to 1907.

== Contributing buildings ==
Contributing buildings

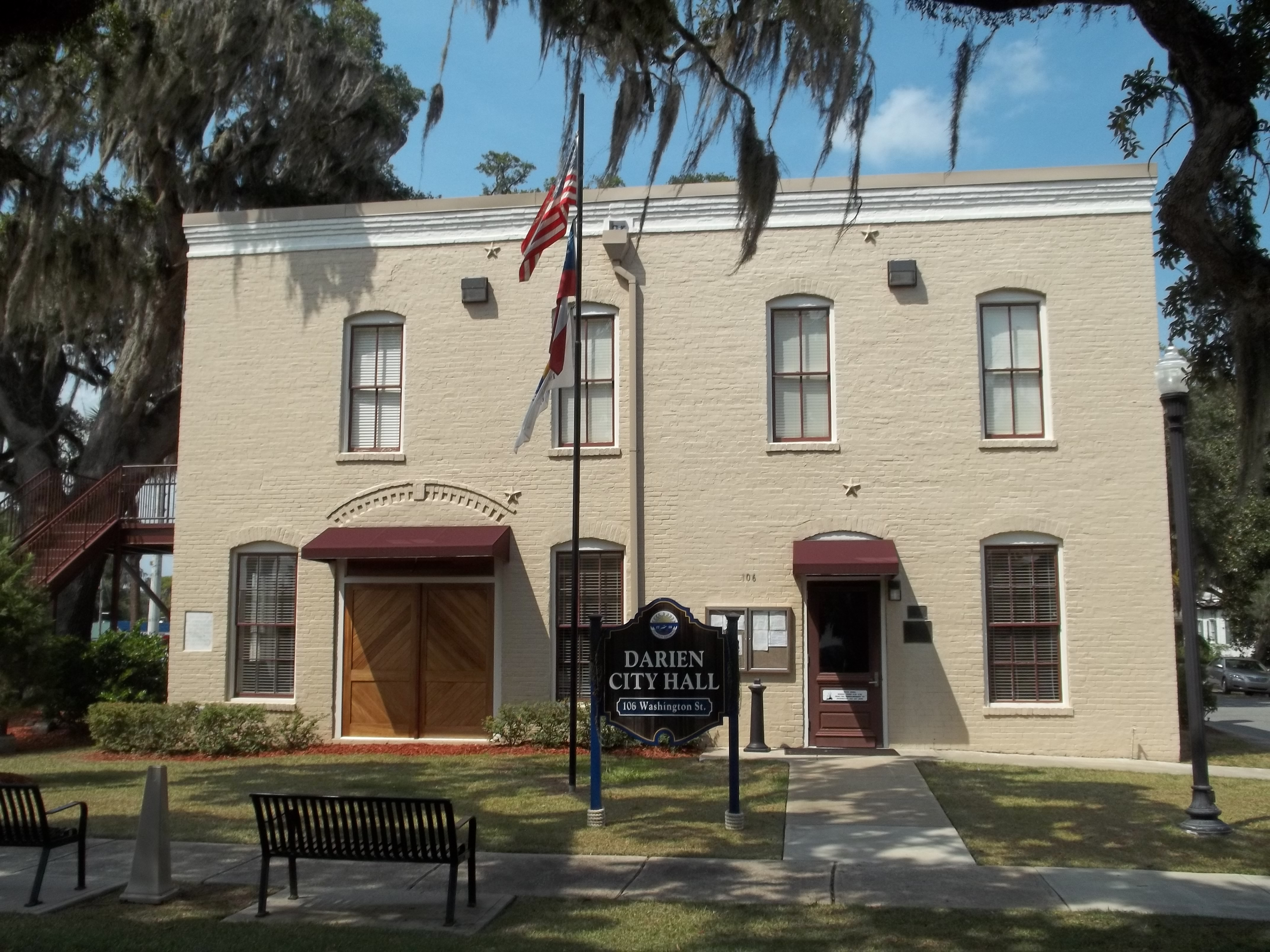
Darien city hall

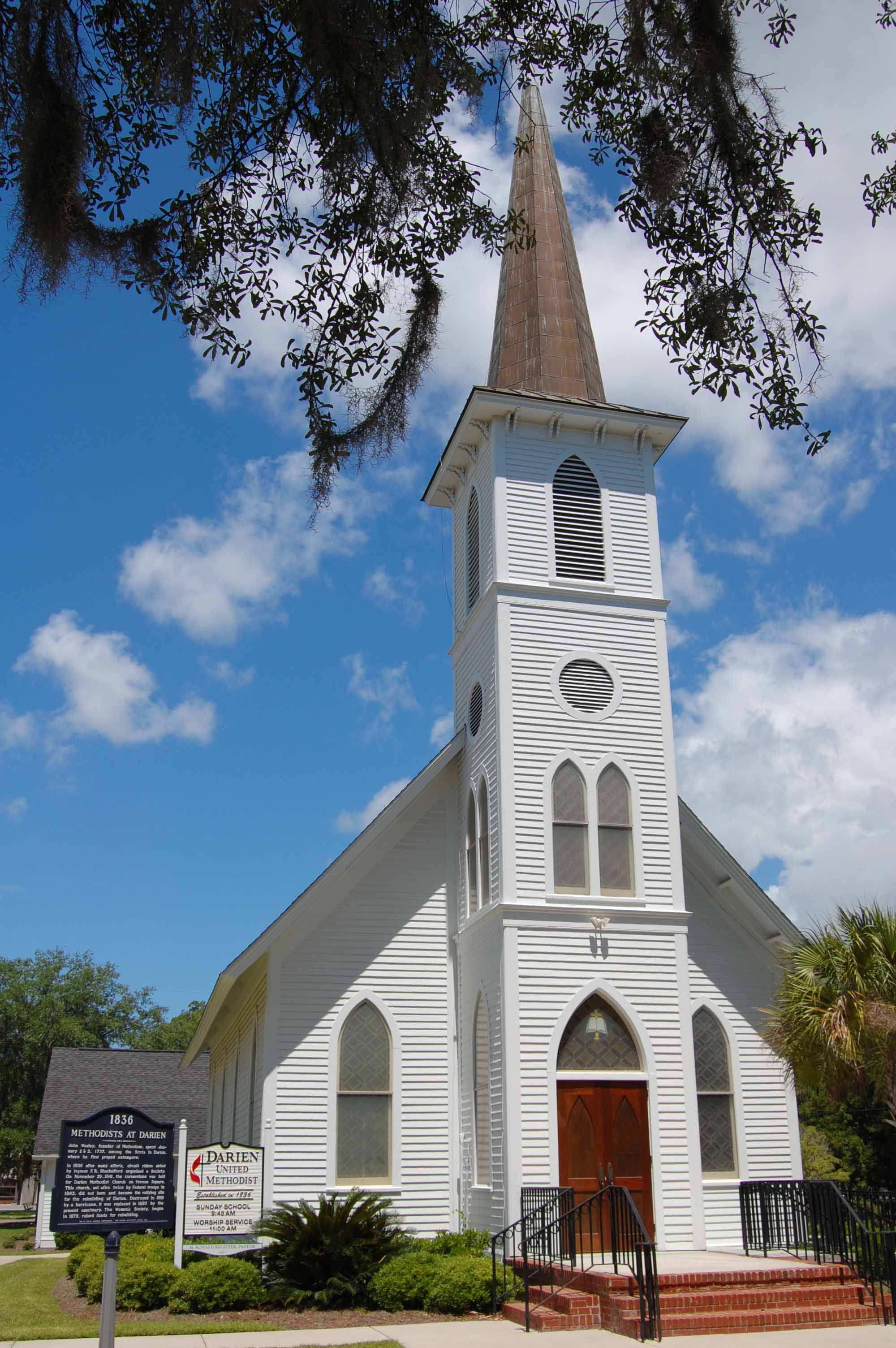
Methodist Church

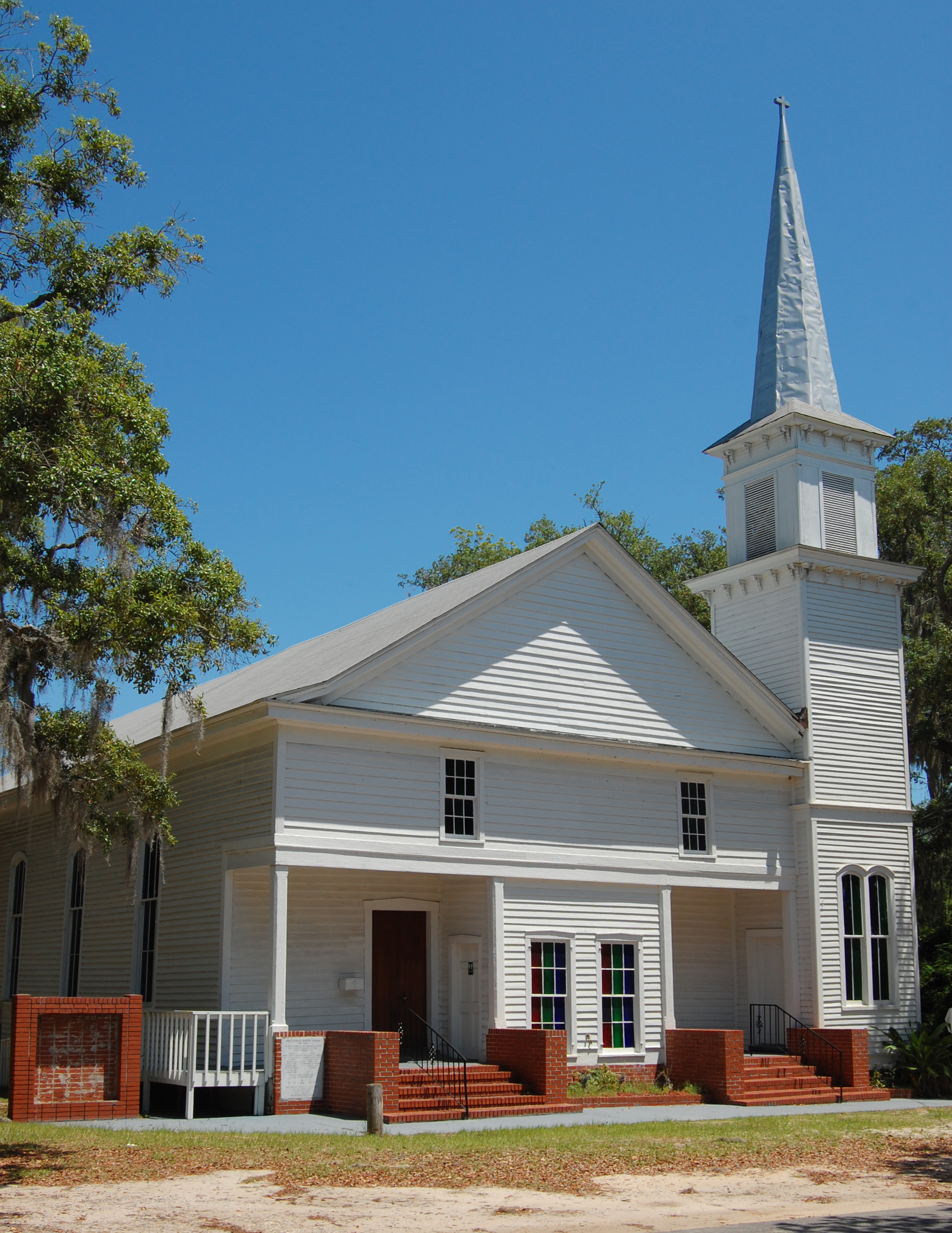
First African Baptist Church

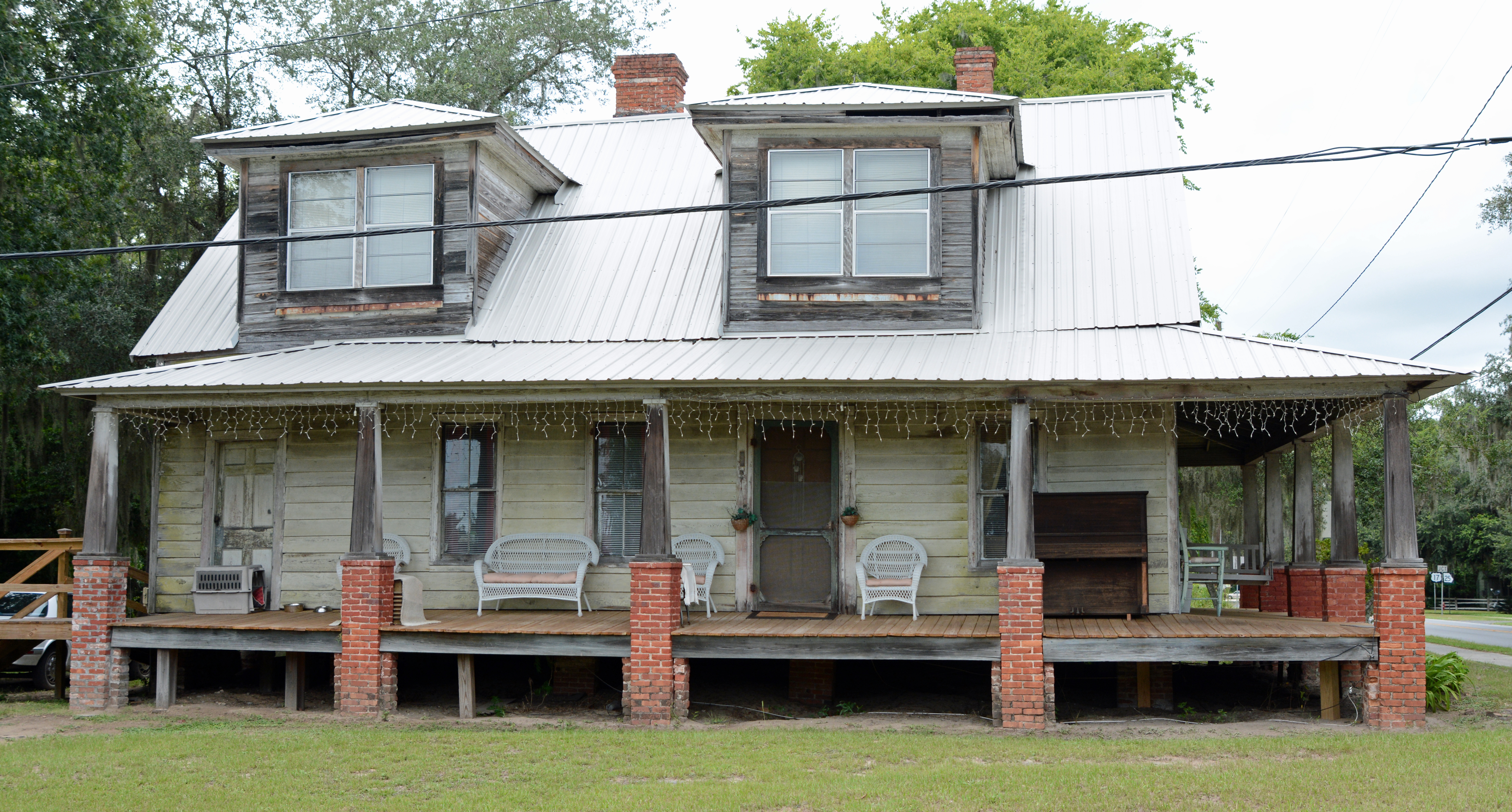
House at Adams and Rittenhouse. One of the few houses not burned during the attack on Darien in 1863 by Union soldiers.

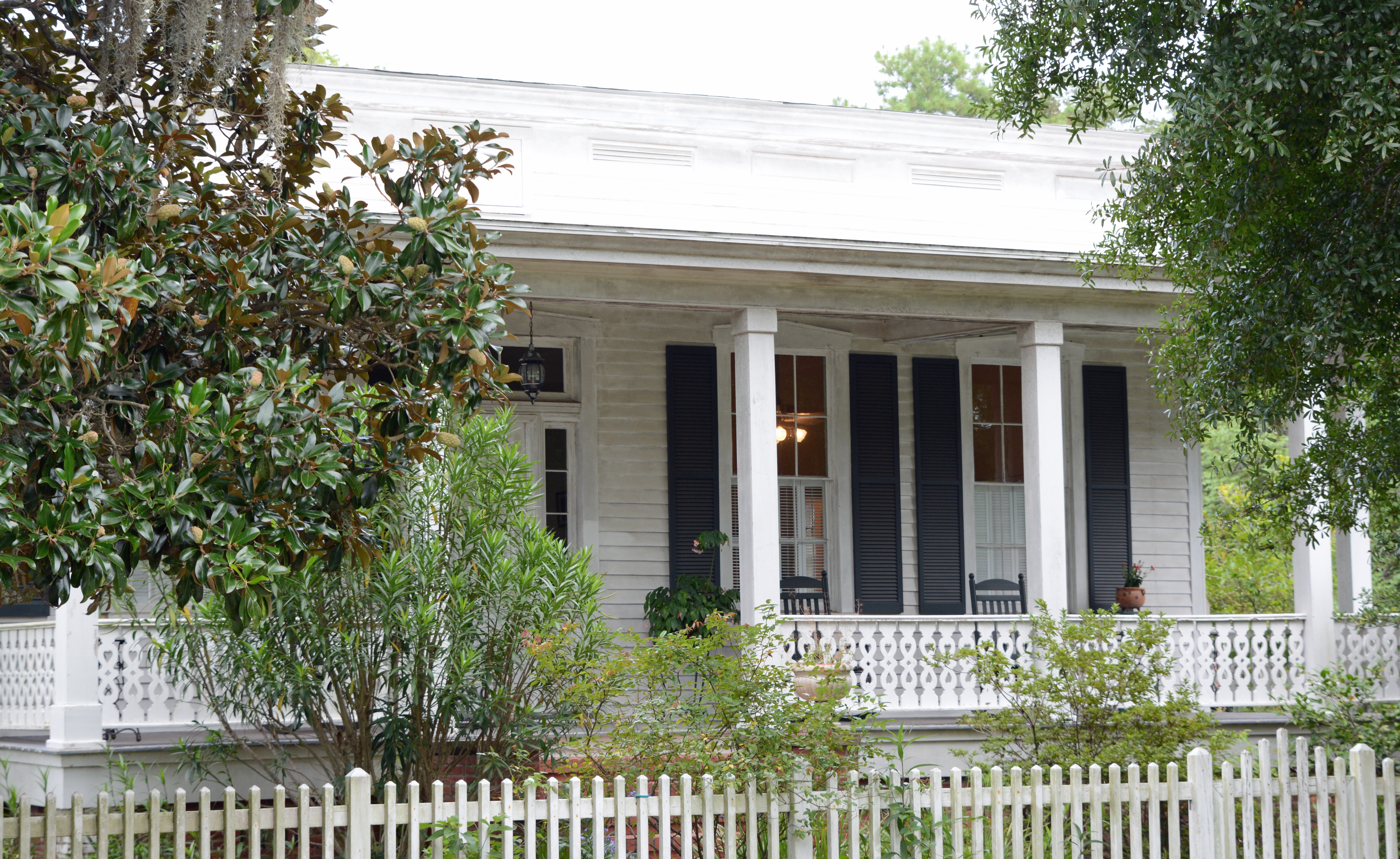
House at Franklin & Fort King George Road

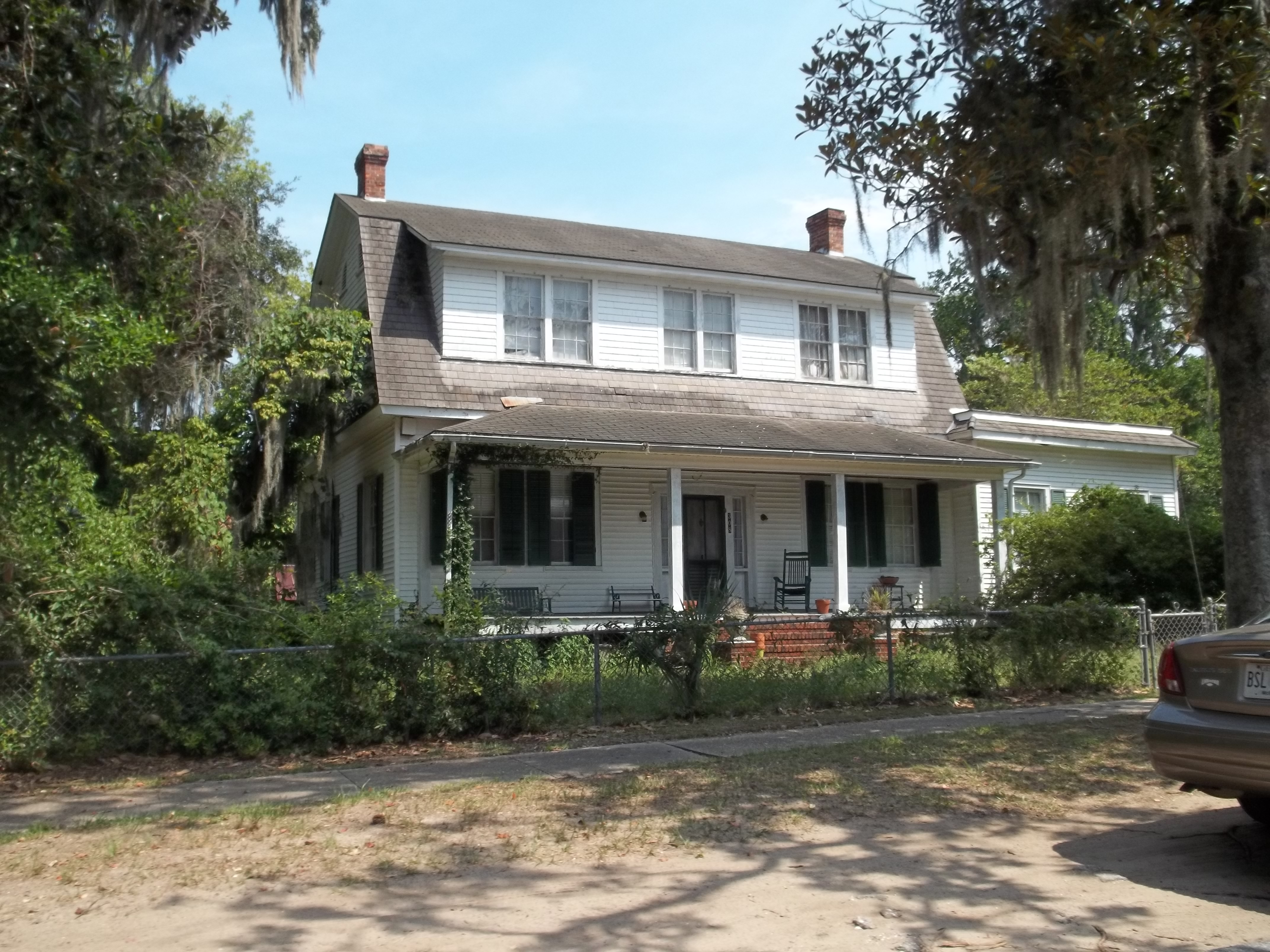
House in the historic district

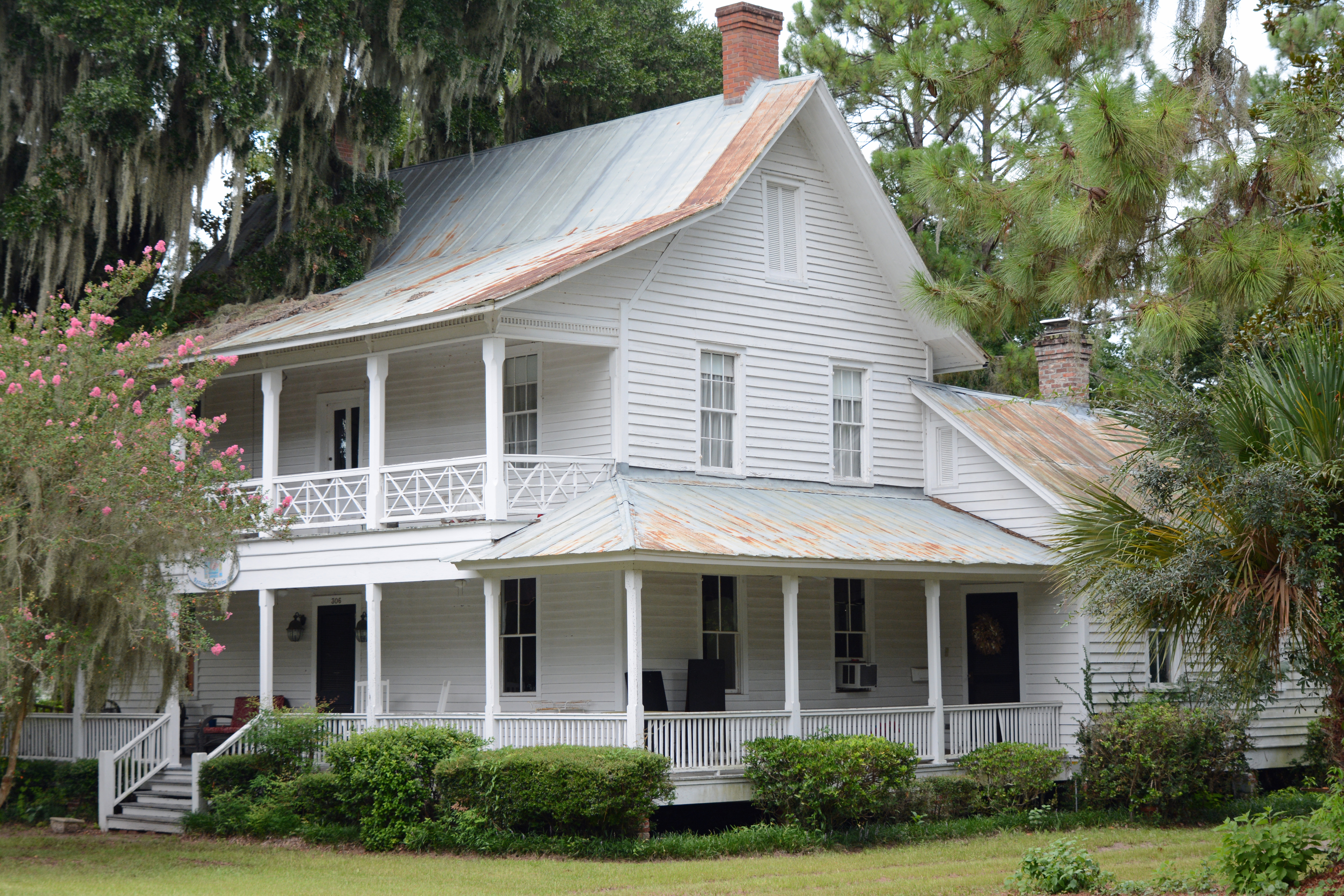
House on Ft. King George Road between Franklin and Rittenhouse

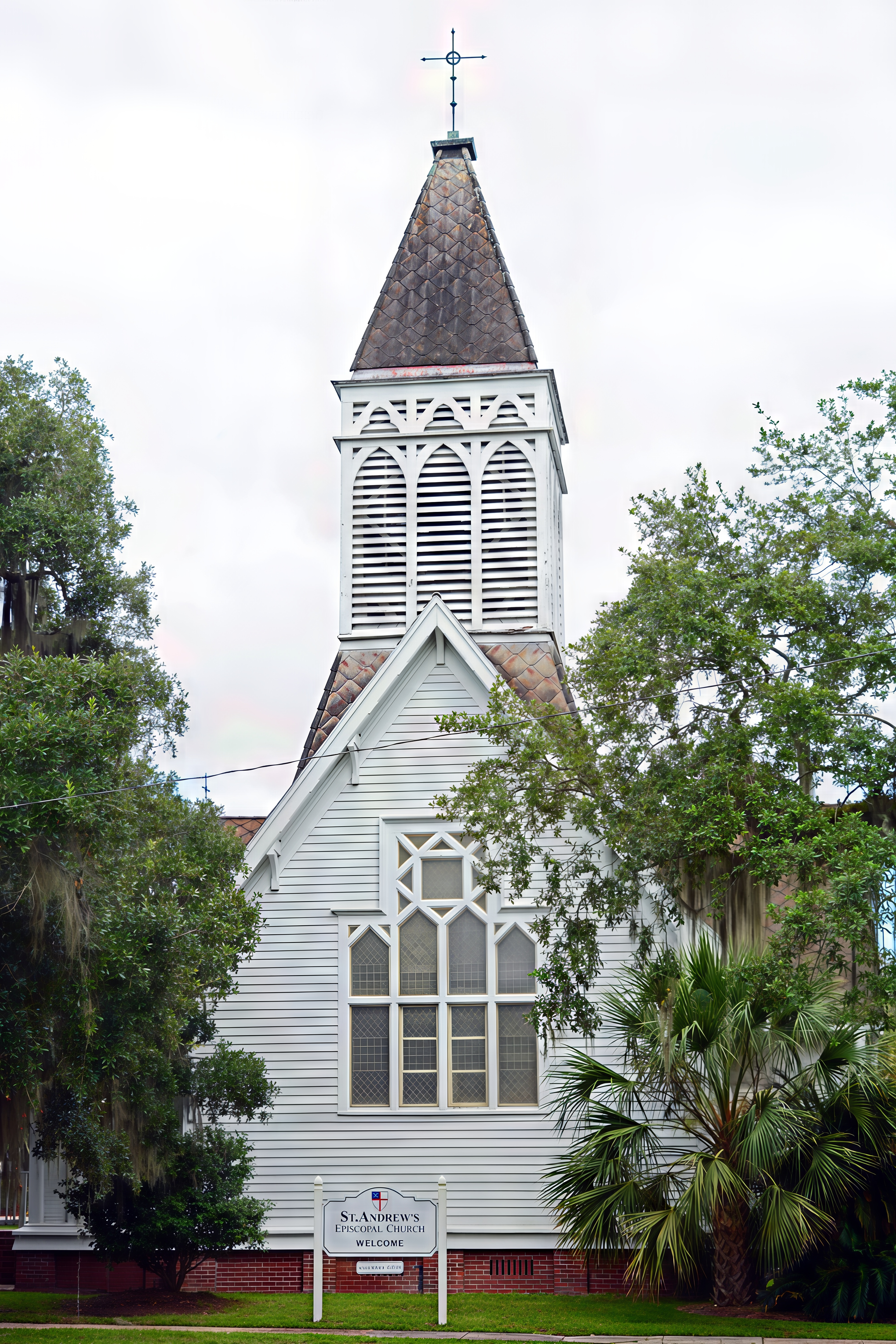
St. Andrews Episcopal Church – the original building was one of the churches burned by the US Army in 1863.

== See also ==
- St. Andrew's Episcopal Church - a contributing building
- West Darien Historic District
