= Darien, Georgia =

City in Georgia, United States

- City
- City of Darien
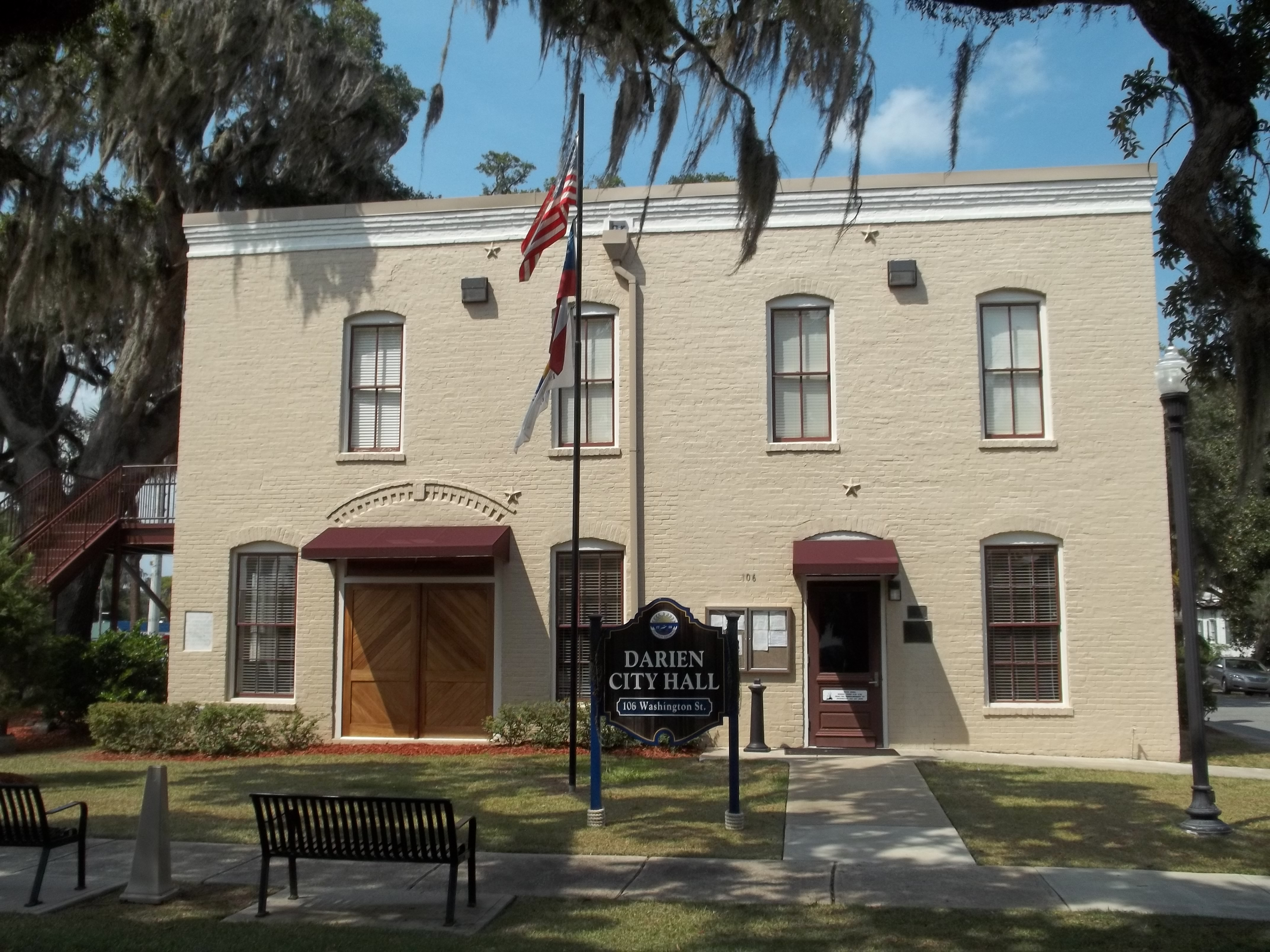
- Darien City Hall

- Seal

- Location in McIntosh County and the state of Georgia
- Coordinates: 31°22′16″N 81°25′51″W
- Country: United States
- State: Georgia
- County: McIntosh

Area
  - Total: 24.04 sq mi (62.26 km^{2})
  - Land: 21.17 sq mi (54.82 km^{2})
  - Water: 2.87 sq mi (7.44 km^{2})
- Elevation: 30 ft (9 m)

Population (2020)
  - Total: 1,460
  - Density: 69.0/sq mi (26.63/km^{2})
- Time zone: UTC-5 (Eastern (EST))
  - Summer (DST): UTC-4 (EDT)
- ZIP code: 31305
- Area code: 912
- FIPS code: 13-21716
- GNIS feature ID: 0331512
- Website: cityofdarienga.com

Darien (/dɛəriˈɛn/) is a city in and the county seat of McIntosh County, Georgia, United States. It lies on Georgia's coast at the mouth of the Altamaha River, approximately 50 miles (80 kilometers) south of Savannah, and is part of the Brunswick, Georgia metropolitan statistical area. It is the second-oldest planned city in Georgia and was originally called New Inverness. The population of Darien was 1,460 at the 2020 census, down from 1,975 in 2010.

== History ==
=== Colonial period ===
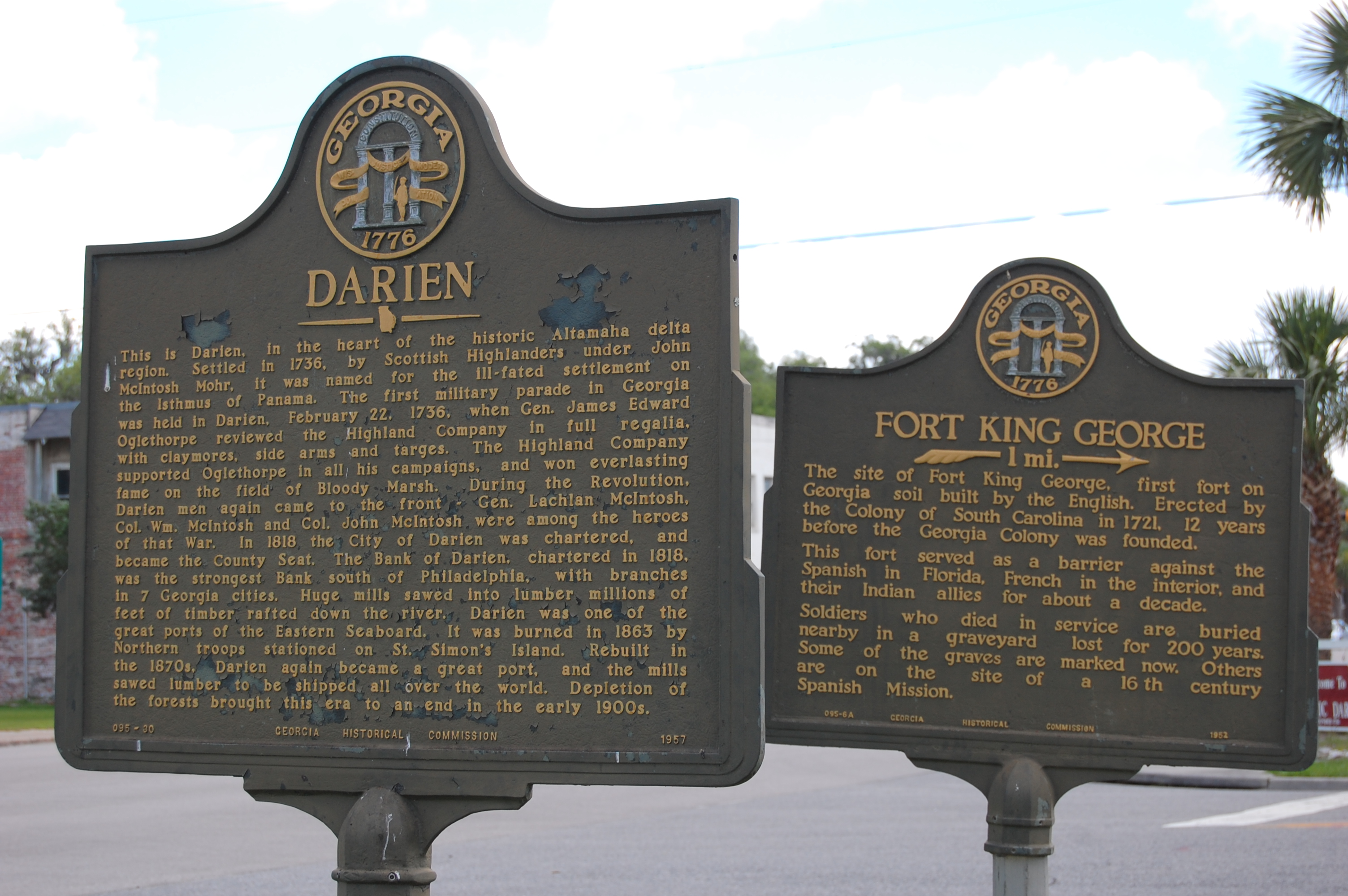
Historical markers

The British built Fort King George in 1721, near what would become Darien. At the time it was the southernmost outpost of the British Empire in North America. The fort was abandoned in 1727 following attacks from the Spanish. Its remains constitute the oldest fort on the Georgia coast.

The town of Darien (originally known as "New Inverness") was founded in January 1736 by Scottish Highlanders recruited by James Oglethorpe to act as settler-soldiers protecting the frontiers of Georgia from the Spanish in Florida, the French in the Alabama basin, and the Indian allies of each colonial enterprise. On January 10, 1736, 177 emigrants, including women and children, arrived on the Prince of Wales to establish Darien, which was named after the Darien scheme, a former Scottish colony in Panama. Among the initial settlers was Lachlan McGillivray, who became a noted trader with the Creek people, and Lachlan McIntosh, a leader during the American Revolutionary War.

The Scots originated mainly from around Inverness and consisted of both Jacobite and Hanoverian supporting clans, the majority of whom spoke only Gaelic. When visited by Oglethorpe in February, the settlers had already constructed "a battery of four pieces of cannon, built a guardhouse, a storehouse, a chapel, and several huts for particular people." Darien was laid out in accordance with the now-famous Oglethorpe Plan.

They showed similar progress in the construction of military forts: by March the Scottish settlers had begun work on two forts, Fort St. Andrews on Cumberland Island, and Fort St. George on the St. Johns River, 60 mi (100 km) to the south of the territory claimed by the British government in the Georgia charter.

In 1736, the British abandoned Fort St. George by agreement with the Spanish officials in Florida. In 1736 Darien settlers began work on Fort Frederica on St. Simons Island, a few miles south of Darien, between it and Cumberland Island. Scots settlers whose travel was paid for by the Trustees of the Colony were organized into two companies, the Highland Independent Company of Foot, an infantry force, and the Highland Rangers, a mounted force. By 1737 the constant military activity of the Darien colony was taking its toll. An additional 44 Highland settlers arrived to expand the town.

Initially the settlers' economy was based on the cultivation of crops; however, after the first year, they suffered a succession of poor harvests. They concentrated on rearing cattle and harvesting timber for sale in nearby Savannah.

In 1739 eighteen of the most prominent members of the Darien colony signed the first petition against the introduction of slavery into Georgia, in response to pleas to Oglethorpe and the trustees by inhabitants of Savannah to lift the prohibition of slavery. The Highlanders' petition was successful, but slavery was introduced ten years later in 1749 because the proprietors could not attract enough laborers to make the colony profitable.

Conflicts continued with Spanish and Indian forces during this time. The War of Jenkins' Ear began in October 1739. In November, in response to two Scots garrisoned on Amelia Island being killed in an ambush by Spanish-allied Indians, the Darien settlers mobilized and, together with forces from South Carolina, captured the Spanish forts Picolata, San Francisco de Pupo, San Diego, and Mose, before attempting to lay siege to St. Augustine. The Spanish won the Battle of Fort Mose, resulting in the death or capture of 51 Darien settlers.

After the battle, a number of the settlers abandoned Darien for South Carolina. By 1741 another shipload of 43 colonists had arrived. These colonists received land grants from the trustees which specified that the land was to pass to the male or female descendants of the original recipients, in "Tail General". The trustees were trying to keep settlers in the colony. Previously, all land grants in the American colonies had been granted in "Tail Male", descending to only the male children. The Highland settlers objected to the change, as it went against their traditional patrilineal landholding and inheritance practices. In the future, the majority of Georgia land grants were made in "Tail General".

In January 1775, the city passed a resolution condemning slavery, saying:

To show the world that we are not influenced by any contracted or interested motives, but a general philanthropy for all mankind, of whatever climate, language, or complexion, we hereby declare our disapprobation and abhorrence of the unnatural practice of Slavery in America, (however the uncultivated state of our country, or other specious arguments may plead for it,) a practice founded in injustice and cruelty, and highly dangerous to our liberties, (as well as our lives,) debasing part of our fellow-creatures below men, and corrupting the virtue and morals of the rest; and is laying the basis of that liberty we contend for (and which we pray the Almighty to continue to the latest posterity) upon a very wrong foundation. We therefore resolve, at all times to use our utmost endevours for the manumission of Slaves...

— Darien Committee, Darien Resolutions, January 12, 1775

=== Civil War and after ===
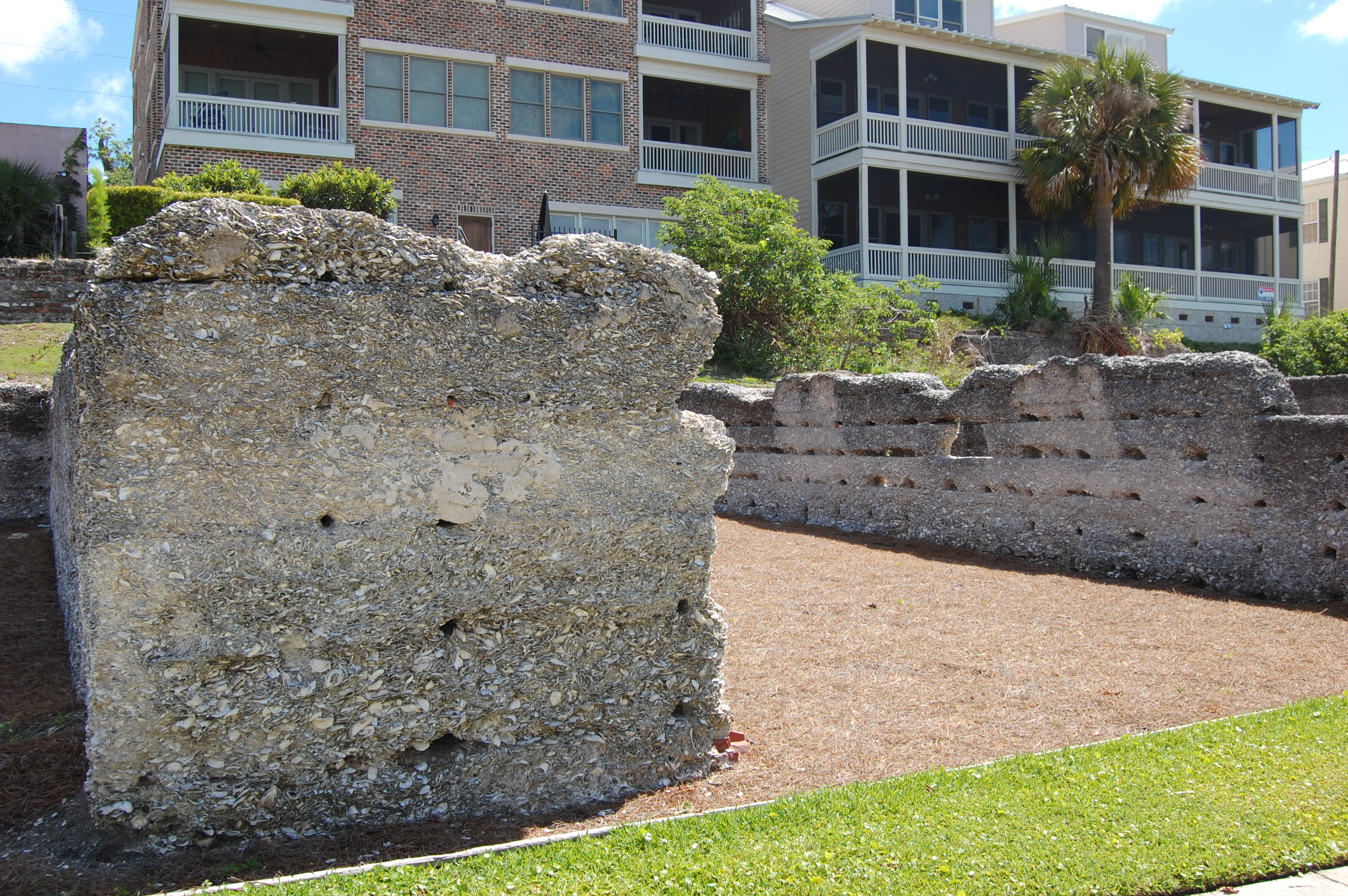
Ruins of warehouses on the waterfront from the burning of the city in 1863

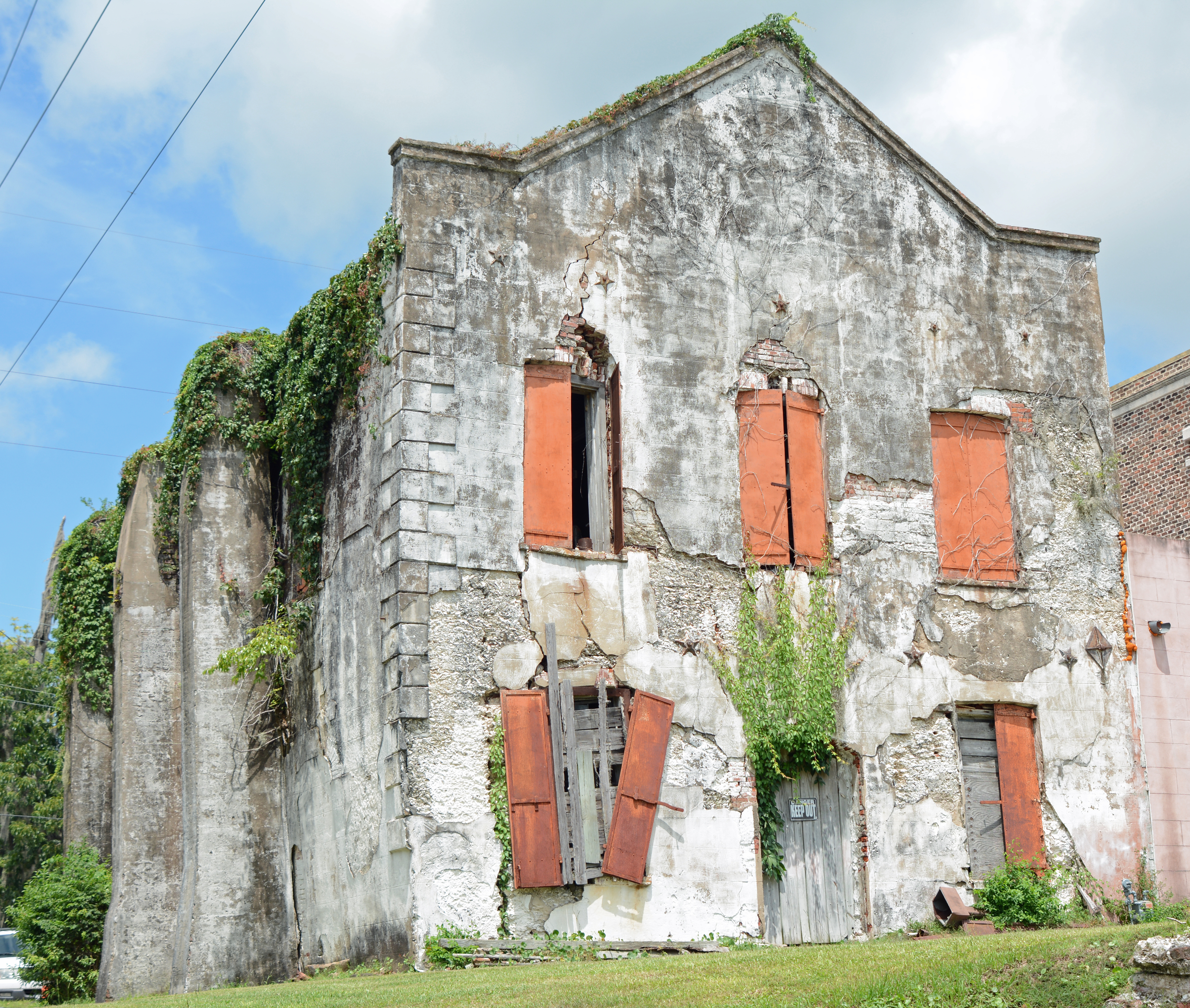
Adam Strain building at Broad and Screven, the only existing building that survived the 1863 burning of Darien by the US Army

On June 11, 1863, Union troops stationed on St. Simons Island looted and destroyed most of the town, including the homes of black residents, mostly slaves. This was not part of Sherman's March to the Sea, which occurred more than a year later. Confusion has arisen because the St. Simons Island troops were under the command of another General Sherman, stationed in the South Carolina Sea Islands.

The destruction of the undefended city, which was of little strategic importance, was carried out by the 54th Massachusetts Volunteers under the command of a reluctant Colonel Robert Gould Shaw and the 2nd South Carolina Volunteers under the command of Colonel James Montgomery. Colonel Montgomery ordered that the town be looted and burned. This was part of the Union strategy to damage the Confederate states' ability to supply food and materiel towards their war effort. Montgomery's troops allegedly broke ranks and looted freely, while Shaw ordered his troops to take only what would be useful at camp (he later described the raid as a "Satanic action").

The First African Baptist Church (claimed to be the oldest African American church in the county) was destroyed along with the rest of the town. It was rebuilt. Later some meetings of the 20th-century Civil Rights Movement were held there.

After the U.S. Army destroyed Darien, gunboats were used to blockade the port. The troops plundered residents and plantations of McIntosh County for food, as armies lived off the land to a great extent. The only defenders left in the county were a group of men too old for military service. On the night of August 3, 1864, the county's white defenders had met at the Ebenezer Church, 9 mi (14 km) north of Darien. Union troops found out about the meeting from the local enslaved people. The troops surrounded the church, opened fire, and captured 23 men. These men were marched to a landing near Darien, put on ships, and taken to prisons in the North.

The destruction of Darien was most famously depicted in the 1989 film Glory.

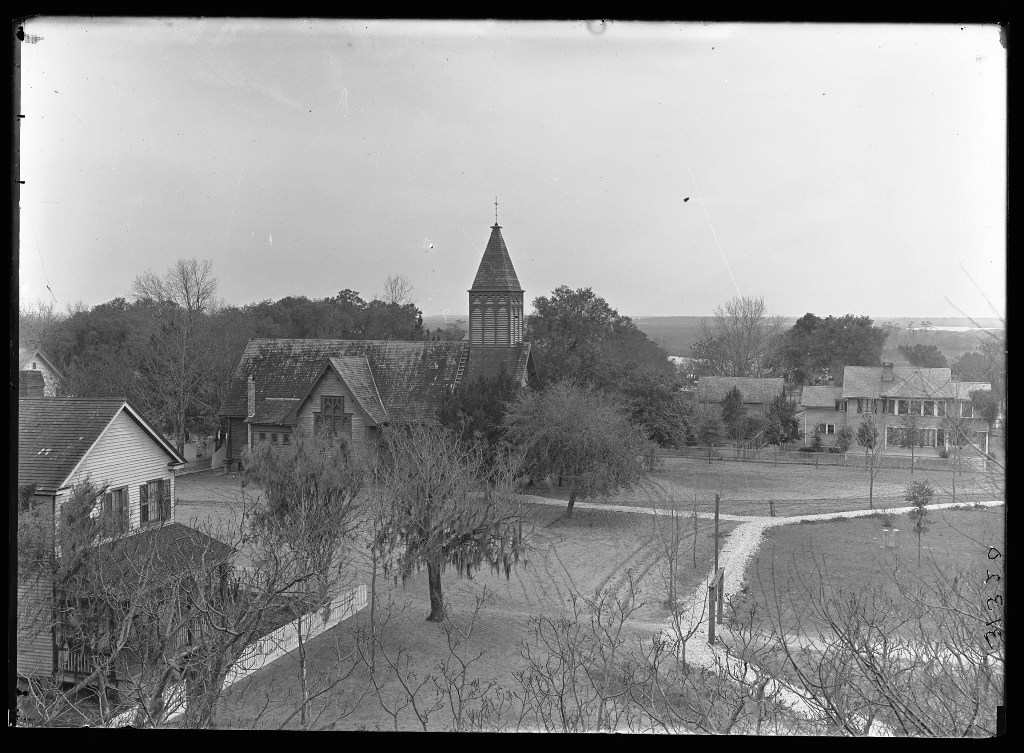
View of St. Andrews Episcopal Church and Vernon Square in Darien in 1910.

Following the Civil War, Darien was rebuilt, with financial aid coming in small part from the family of Colonel Robert Gould Shaw. He had been killed during the war but had written to his family of his shame in participating in the destruction of this town.

Into the early 1900s, Darien was one of the largest Southeastern ports for shipping lumber. When the timber was depleted, Darien became a fishing village, known primarily for Georgia wild shrimp. It was once famous for its oysters.

On September 8, 1930, two African American men, George Grant and Willie Bryan, were lynched by a mob of Darien's white residents in the Darien Jail. Police Chief Robert L. Freeman had been killed and Deputy Collins and two other officers were wounded while trying to capture the two Black men after a robbery at the Darien Bank. Colonel W.R. Neal of the Georgia militia put the town under martial law in response to the mob.

There are 32 markers of historic sites near Darien and 42 markers in McIntosh County. (See the external link for a list.)

Darien in the 21st century has shown signs of growth. With the formation of the Interstate Highway System, Interstate 95 was constructed and passes approximately 1 mi (2 km) west of the city. This drew off businesses from the city center as development ensued near the I-95 interchange with GA 251. This has resulted in the building of several chain restaurants, gas stations, and hotels, as well as a small outlet mall. But downtown Darien has flourished with an emphasis on its historic heritage and the waterfront. Many new businesses have opened as the city has reclaimed its walking center.

=== Squares ===
Darien was established with five squares based on the Oglethorpe Plan that James Oglethorpe used in his design of Savannah, Georgia. Three of the five original squares in Darien still exist: Vernon Square and Columbus Square in the Vernon Square–Columbus Square Historic District, and Oglethorpe Square. One of the original squares, Jefferson Square, has been replaced by tennis courts and the other original square, Franklin Square, is now an empty lot.

== Geography ==
Darien is located on the southern edge of McIntosh County at 31°22′16″N 81°25′51″W (31.371134, −81.430742). It is bordered to the south by the Altamaha River, 10 miles (16 km) upstream (west) from its mouth at the Atlantic Ocean. The city is sited on a low bluff overlooking the Darien River, a tidal channel that reaches the Atlantic at Doboy Sound north of the Altamaha.

U.S. Route 17 passes through the center of town, leading north 11 miles (18 km) to Eulonia and south 17 miles (27 km) to Brunswick. Interstate 95 passes through the west side of the city limits, with access from Exit 49 (State Route 250). I-95 leads north 62 miles (100 km) to Savannah and south 78 miles (126 km) to Jacksonville, Florida.

According to the United States Census Bureau, the city has a total area of 24.0 square miles (62 km^{2}), of which 21.2 square miles (55 km^{2}) are land and 2.9 square miles (7.5 km^{2}), or 11.94%, are water.

== Demographics ==
Historical population
Census	Pop.	Note	%±
1850	550		—
1860	570		3.6%
1870	547		−4.0%
1880	1,543		182.1%
1890	1,491		−3.4%
1900	1,739		16.6%
1910	1,391		−20.0%
1920	823		−40.8%
1930	937		13.9%
1940	1,015		8.3%
1950	1,380		36.0%
1960	1,569		13.7%
1970	1,826		16.4%
1980	1,731		−5.2%
1990	1,783		3.0%
2000	1,719		−3.6%
2010	1,975		14.9%
2020	1,460		−26.1%
U.S. Decennial Census

=== 2020 census ===
As of the 2020 census, Darien had a population of 1,460. The median age was 51.3 years. 16.2% of residents were under the age of 18 and 26.1% of residents were 65 years of age or older. For every 100 females there were 84.1 males, and for every 100 females age 18 and over there were 81.9 males age 18 and over.

0.0% of residents lived in urban areas, while 100.0% lived in rural areas.

There were 679 households in Darien, of which 22.8% had children under the age of 18 living in them. Of all households, 33.7% were married-couple households, 17.7% were households with a male householder and no spouse or partner present, and 40.8% were households with a female householder and no spouse or partner present. About 33.9% of all households were made up of individuals and 16.9% had someone living alone who was 65 years of age or older.

There were 862 housing units, of which 21.2% were vacant. The homeowner vacancy rate was 3.4% and the rental vacancy rate was 16.8%.

Darien racial composition as of 2020
Race	Num.	Perc.
White (non-Hispanic)	810	55.48%
Black or African American (non-Hispanic)	542	37.12%
Native American	14	0.97%
Asian	15	1.03%
Other/Mixed	58	3.97%
Hispanic or Latino	21	1.44%

== Government ==
The city has changed its form of government to council/manager and has hired a city manager.

== Education ==
=== McIntosh County School District ===
The McIntosh County School District consists of two elementary schools, a middle school, and a high school. The district has 121 full-time teachers and 1,979 students.

- Todd Grant Elementary School
- McIntosh County Middle School
- McIntosh County Academy

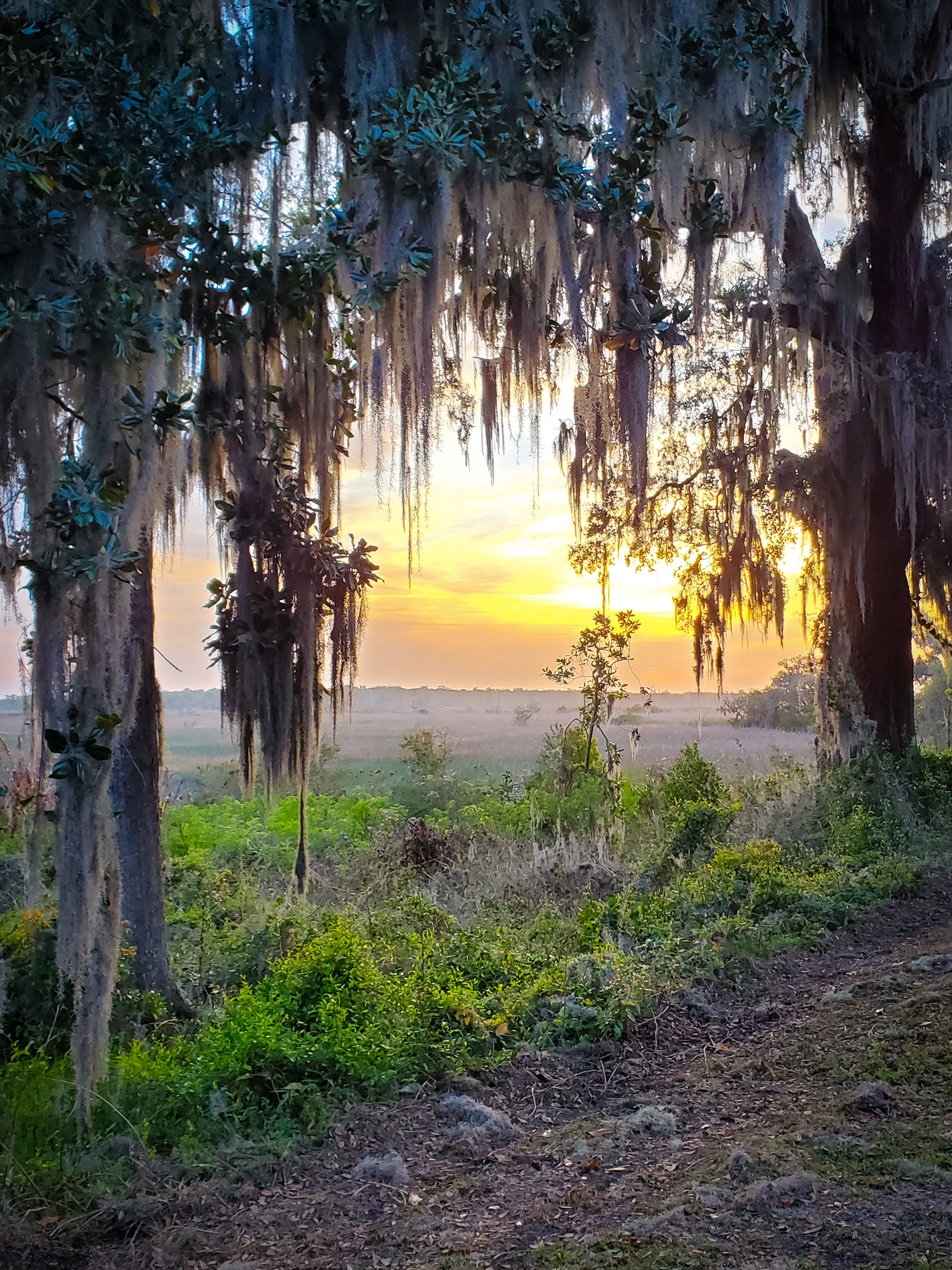
Marshland view from historic downtown area.

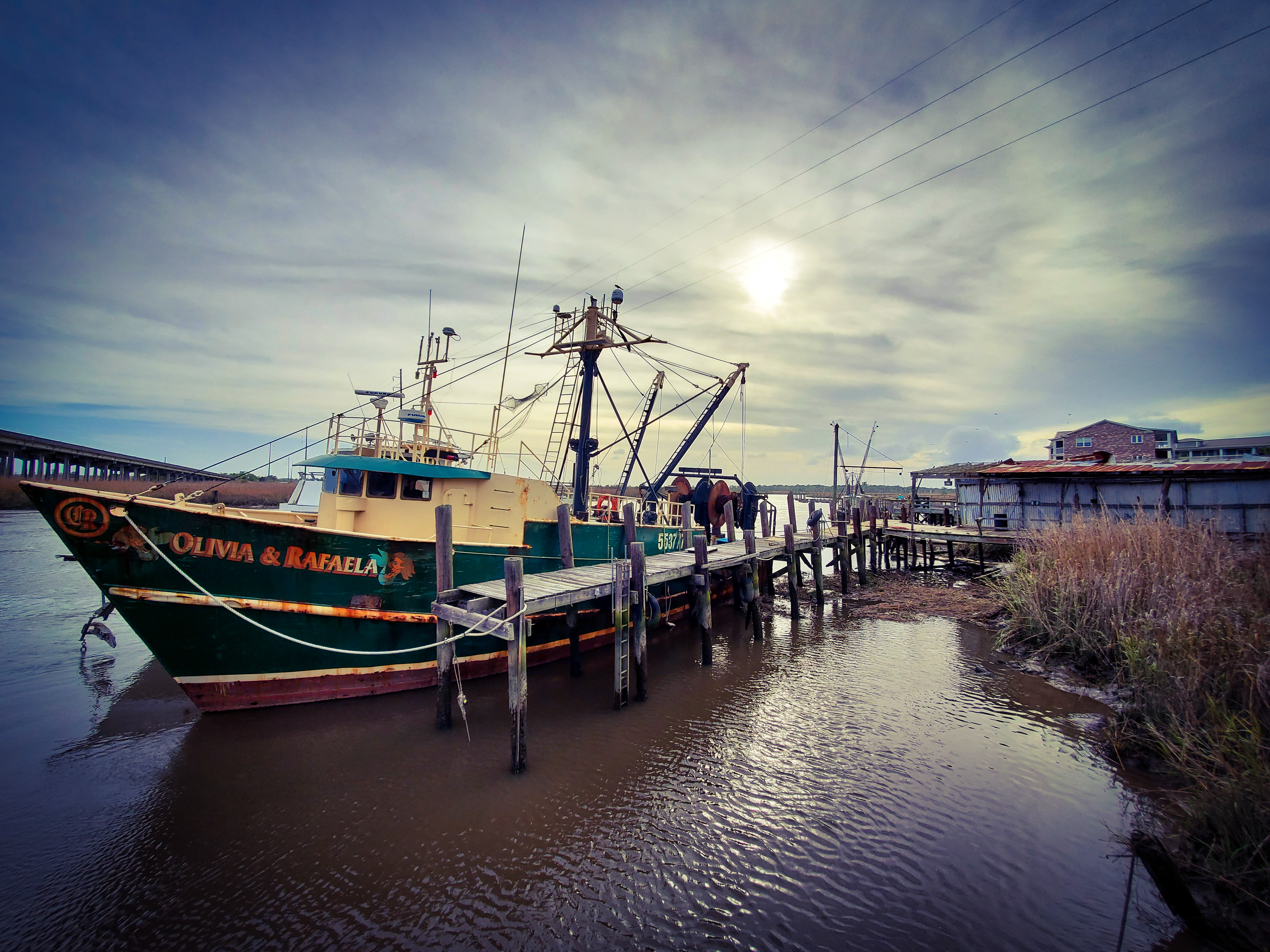
Shrimping boats docked near Darien River WaterFront Park & Docks. (March 2022)

== Notable people ==
- Charles S. Thomas (1849-1934), Confederate soldier and later United States senator, born in Darien

== Gallery ==
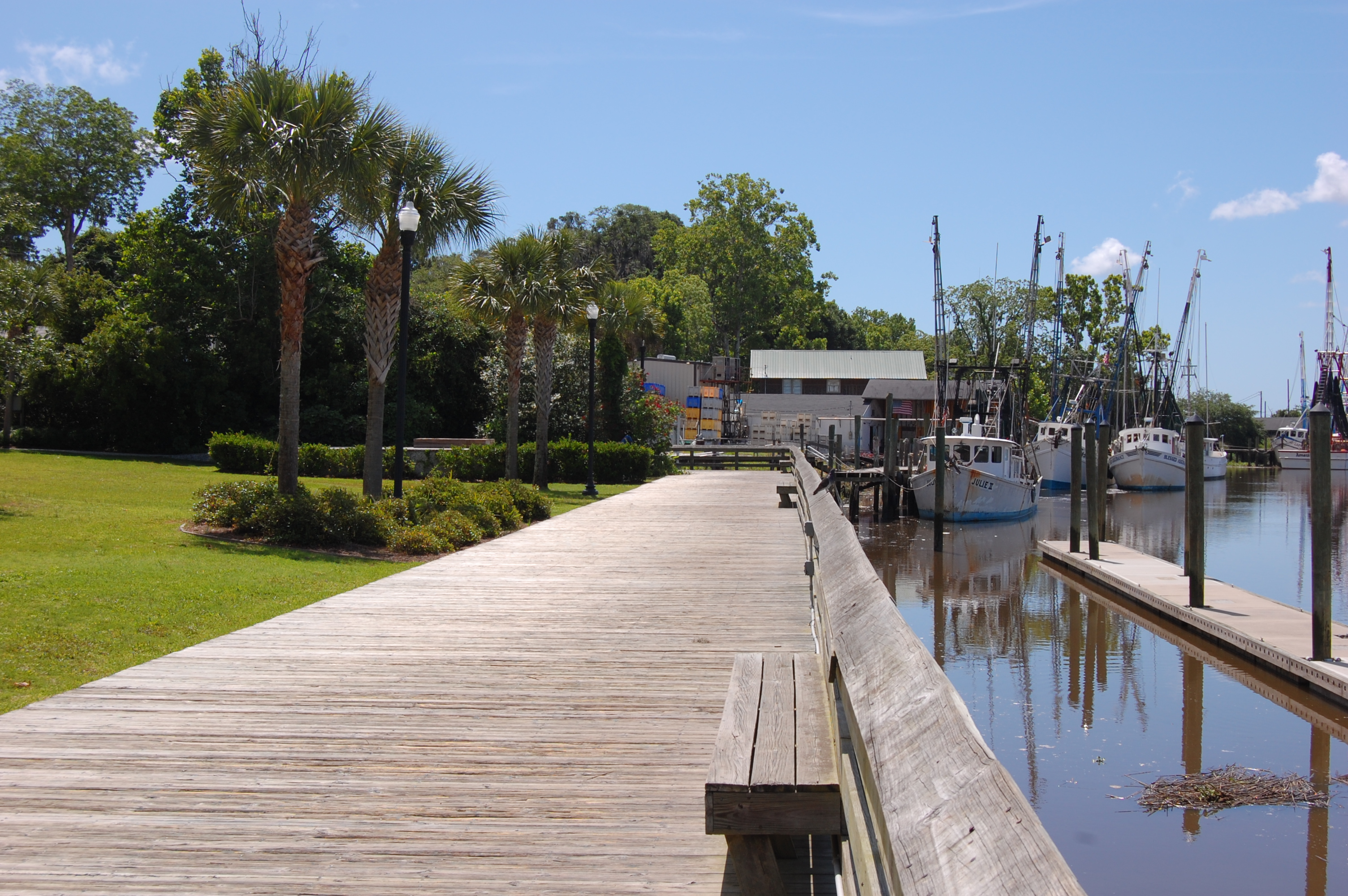
Waterfront Park

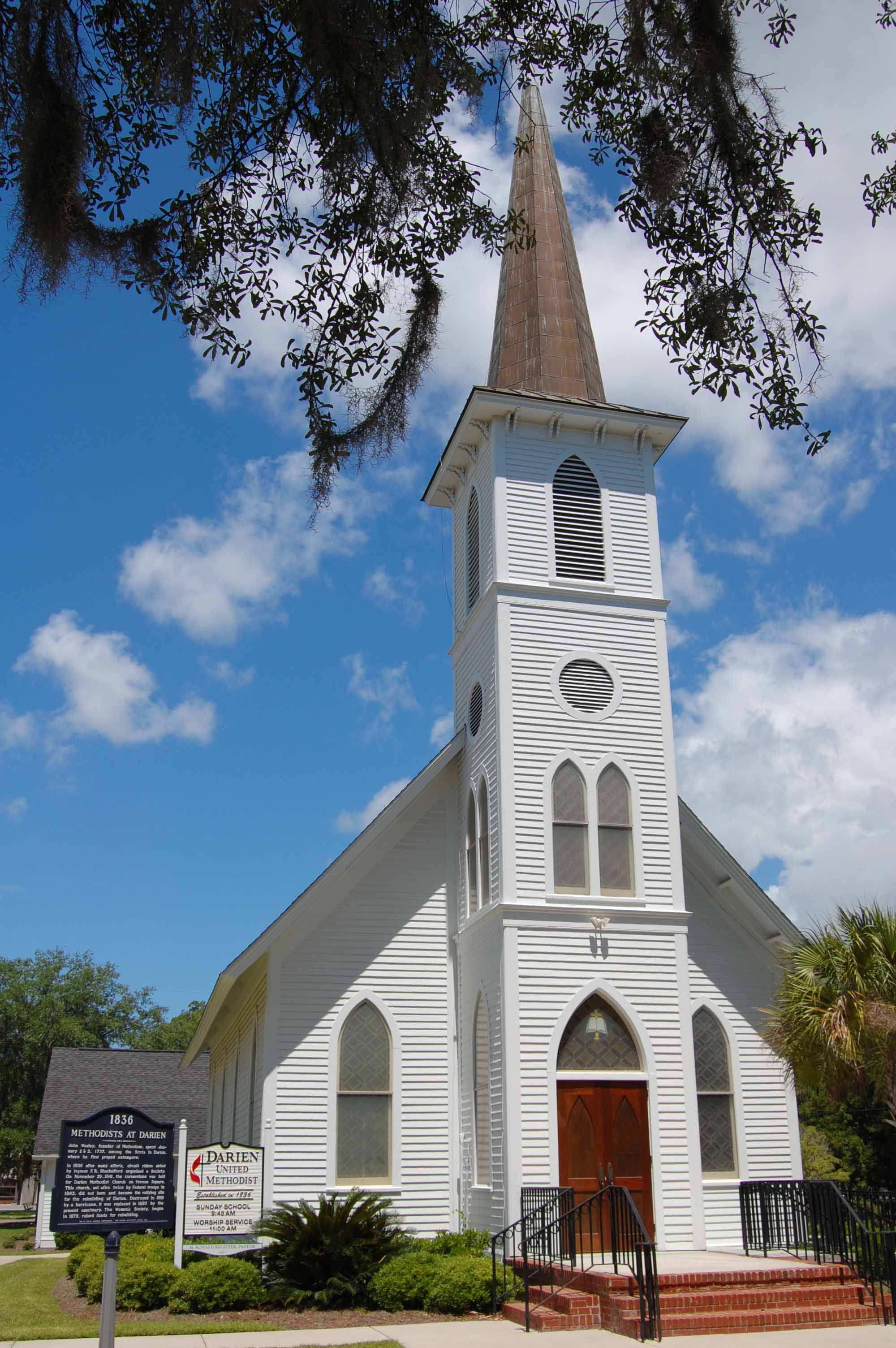
Methodist church

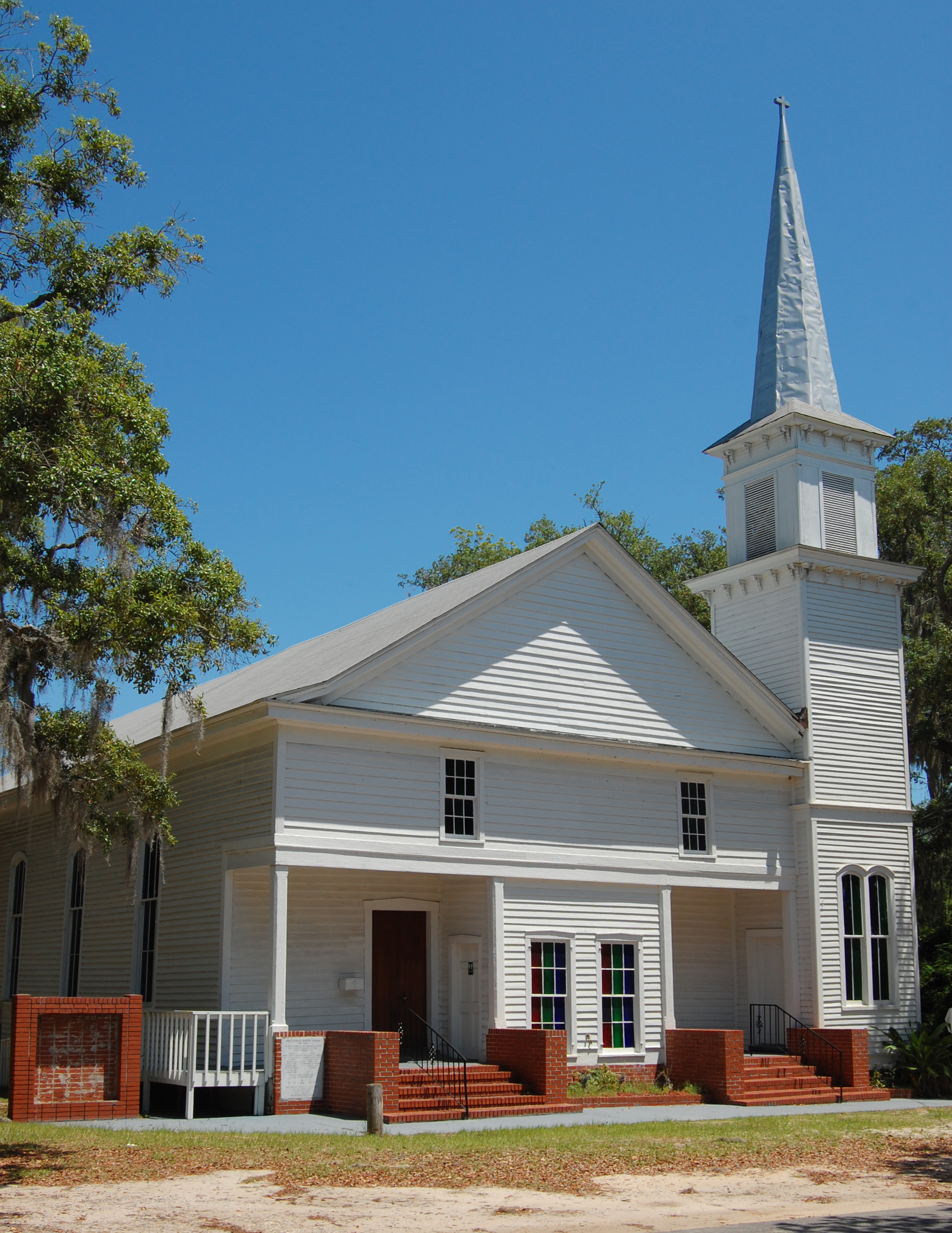
First African Baptist church

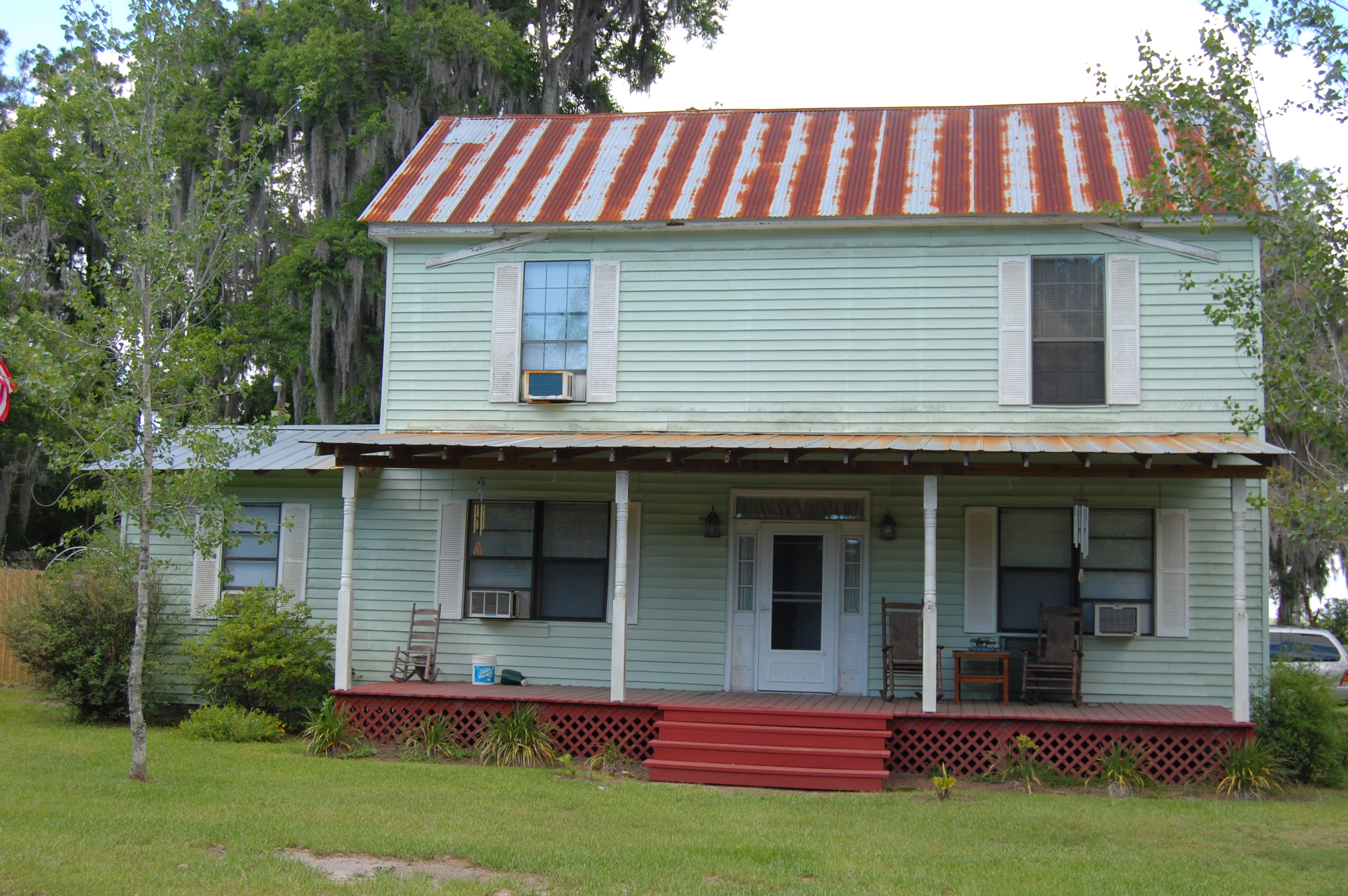
Postbellum house

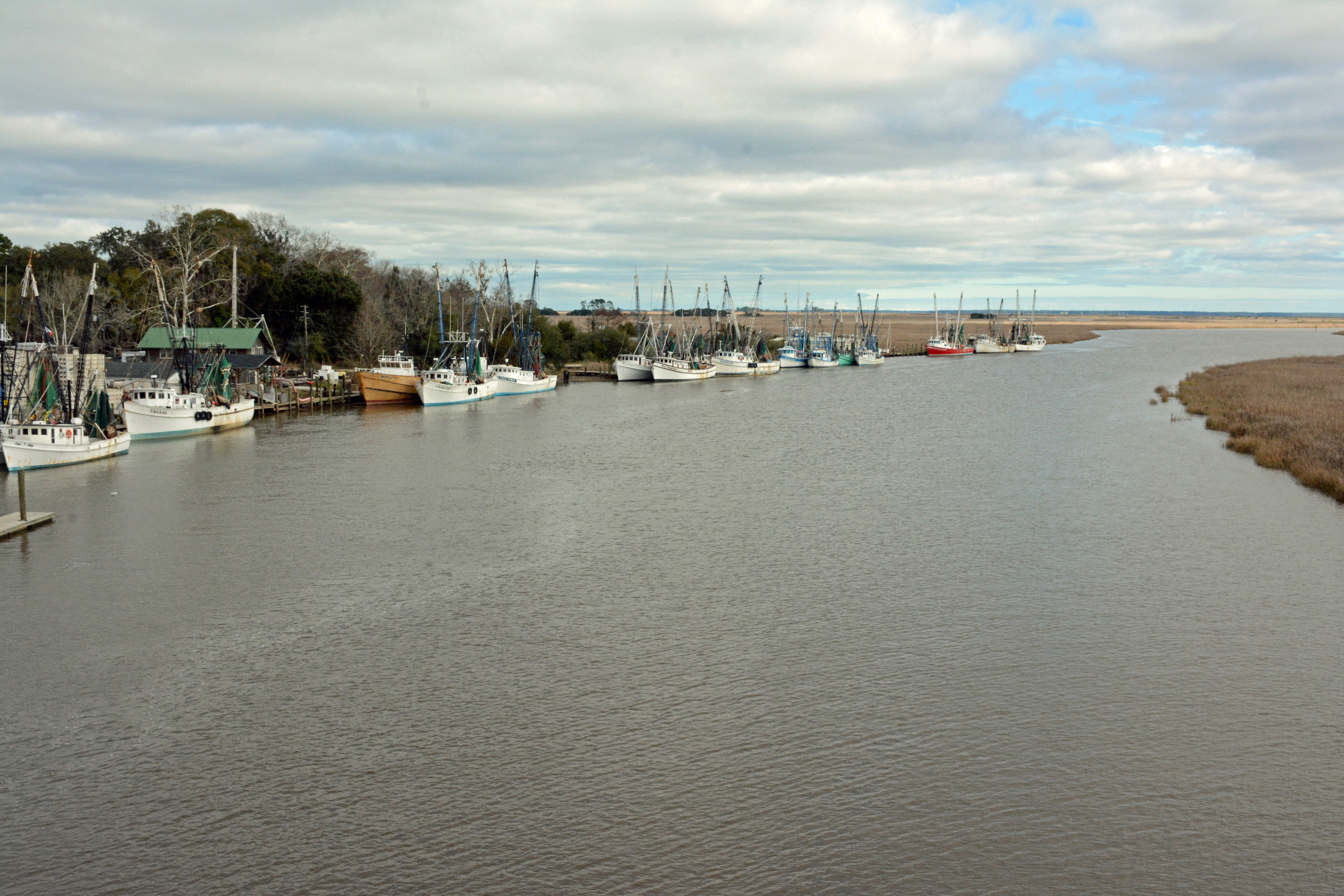
The Darien River. The city of Darien is to the left.

== See also ==
- Vernon Square–Columbus Square Historic District
- West Darien Historic District
