= McIntosh County School District =

School district in Georgia (U.S. state)

Address
- 1100B C.A. DeVillars Road Darien, Georgia, 31305; United States
- Coordinates: 31.375911°N 81.43316°W

District information
- Grades: Pre-Kindergarten – 12
- Superintendent: Melissa H. Williams

Students and staff
- Enrollment: 1,333 (2022–23)
- Faculty: 98.30 (FTE)

Other information
- Telephone: (912) 437–6645
- Fax: (912) 437–2140
- Website: mcintosh.k12.ga.us

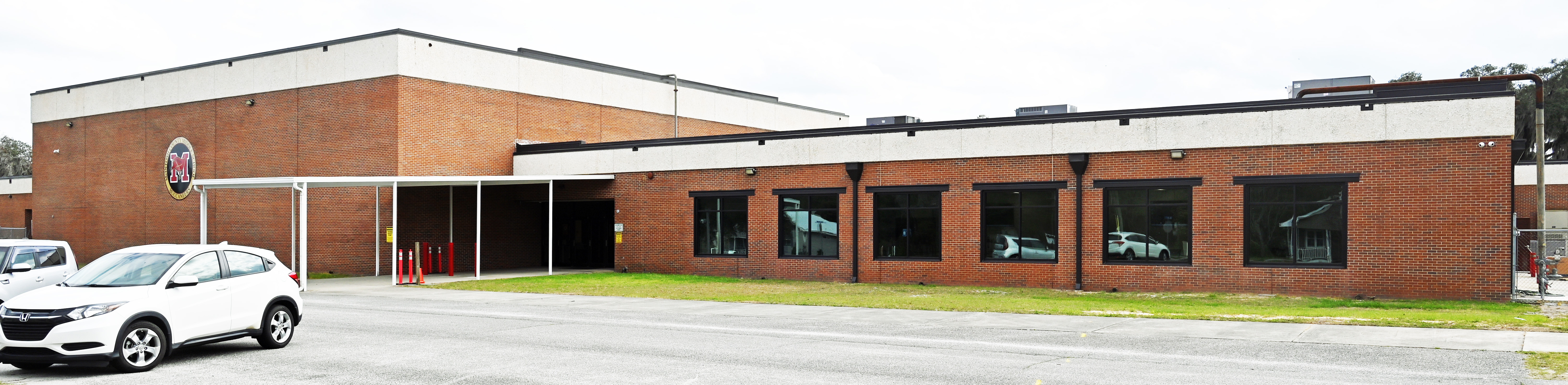
McIntosh County Middle School

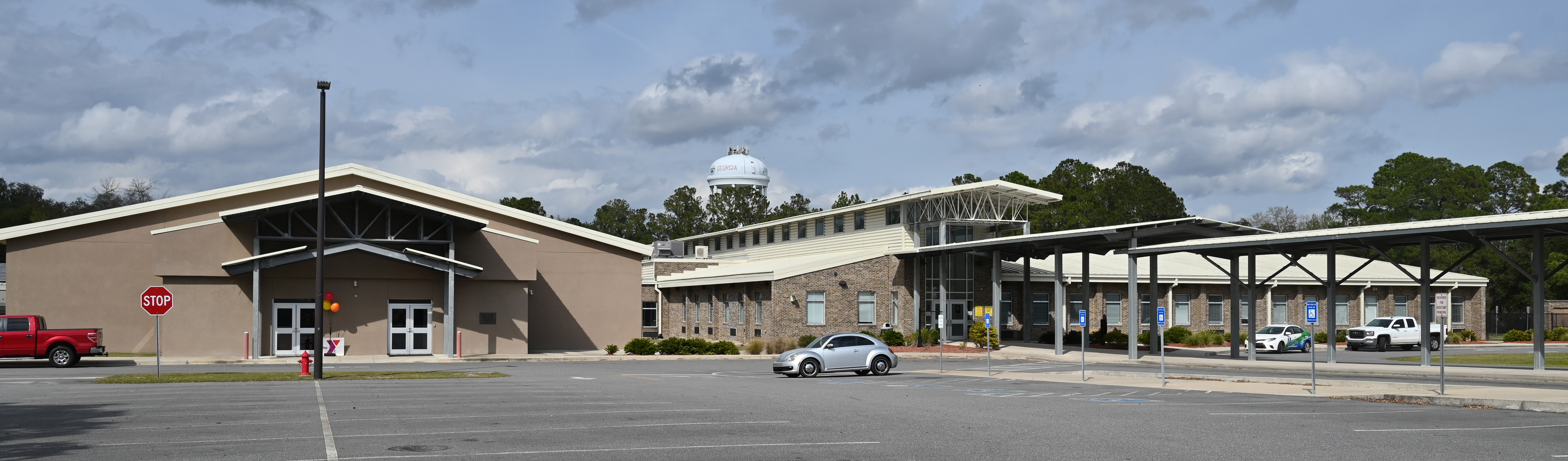
Todd Grant Elementary School

The McIntosh County School District is a public school district in McIntosh County, Georgia, United States, based in Darien. It serves the communities of Crescent, Darien, Eulonia, and Townsend.

== Schools ==
The McIntosh County School District has two elementary schools, one middle school, and one high school.

- Todd Grant Elementary School
- McIntosh County Middle School
- McIntosh County Academy (High school)

== Facilities ==
The district headquarters were previously at 200 Pine Street.
