= Fort Mitchell, Florida =

Capital of the short-lived Republic of East Florida

Fort Michell, located in today's Alachua County, was the capital of the short-lived Republic of East Florida during the Patriot War of 1814.

Only one building was built, a 25-foot [7 meters]-square, two-story blockhouse. It was located about one mile [1.6 km] from the city limits of modern Micanopy, Florida. Its precise location is not known.

In January 1814, a group of soldier-settlers erected a two-story blockhouse and dubbed it Fort Mitchell, after the Governor of Georgia, David Mitchell. General Buckner F. Harris declared Fort Mitchell to be the capital of the Republic of East Florida. After building the fort, a petition was drafted to the U.S. Congress asking to annex the "District of Elotchaway [Alachua] in the Republic of East Florida" (much larger than the current county) as a territory to the U.S. They also offered to send soldiers to fight the British as the War of 1812 was occurring.

The fort was abandoned by May of 1814 after Buckner was killed by Seminoles.
