= Barbour Island River =

Stream in Georgia, U.S.

Coordinates: 31°33′24″N 81°13′40″W

Barbour Island River is a stream in the U.S. state of Georgia. It empties into Sapelo Sound.

Barbour Island River takes its name from the island of the same name along its course.
