= Tunis Campbell =

Tunis Campbell may refer to:

- Tunis Campbell Jr.
- Tunis Campbell Sr.
