= Ashantilly =

Historic house in Georgia, United States

- U.S. National Register of Historic Places
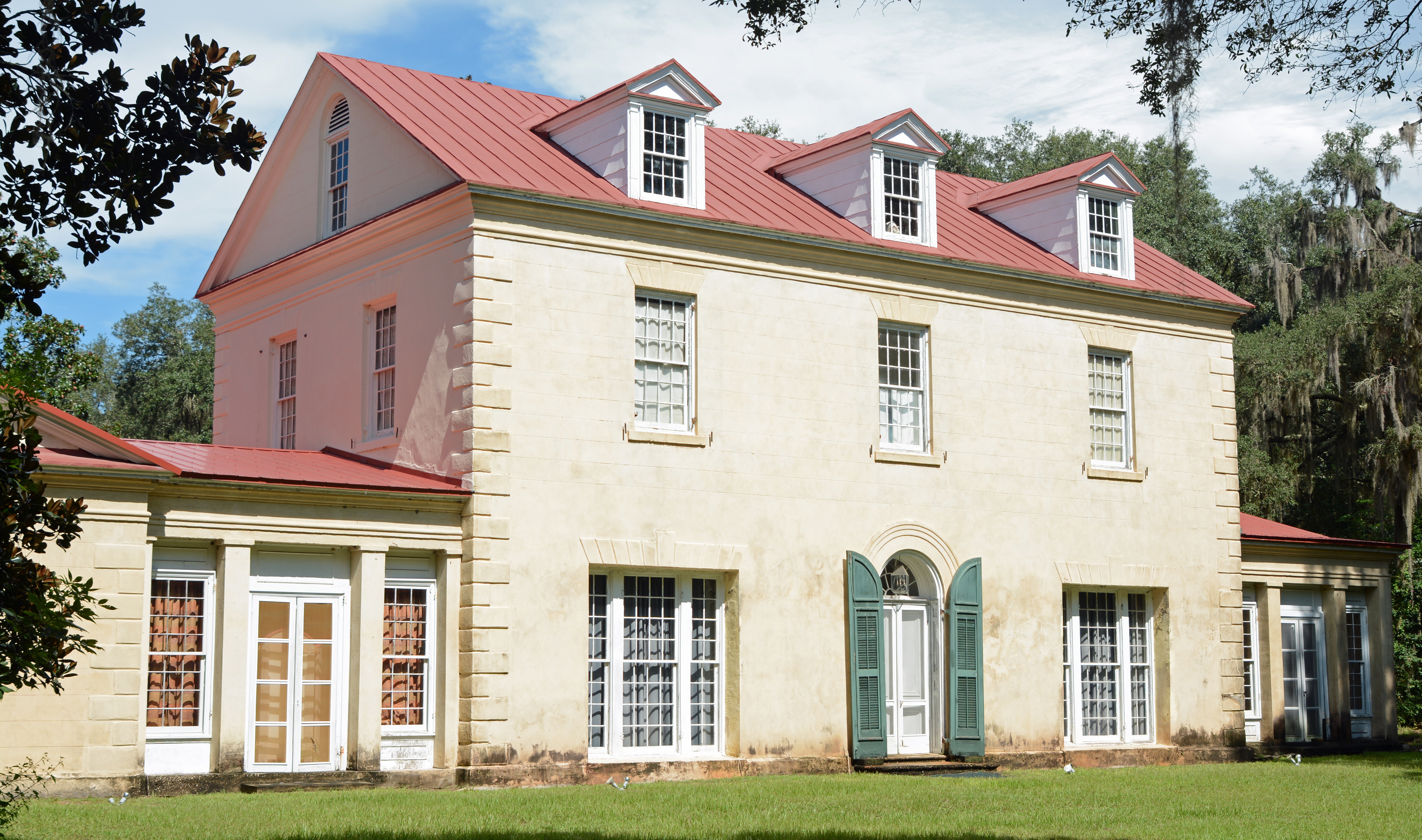

- Location within Georgia Location within the United States
- Location: McIntosh County, Georgia
- Nearest city: Darien, Georgia
- Coordinates: 31.381165°N 81.413051°W
- Area: 34 acres (14 ha)
- Built: 1820
- NRHP reference No.: 15000103
- Added to NRHP: August 25, 2015

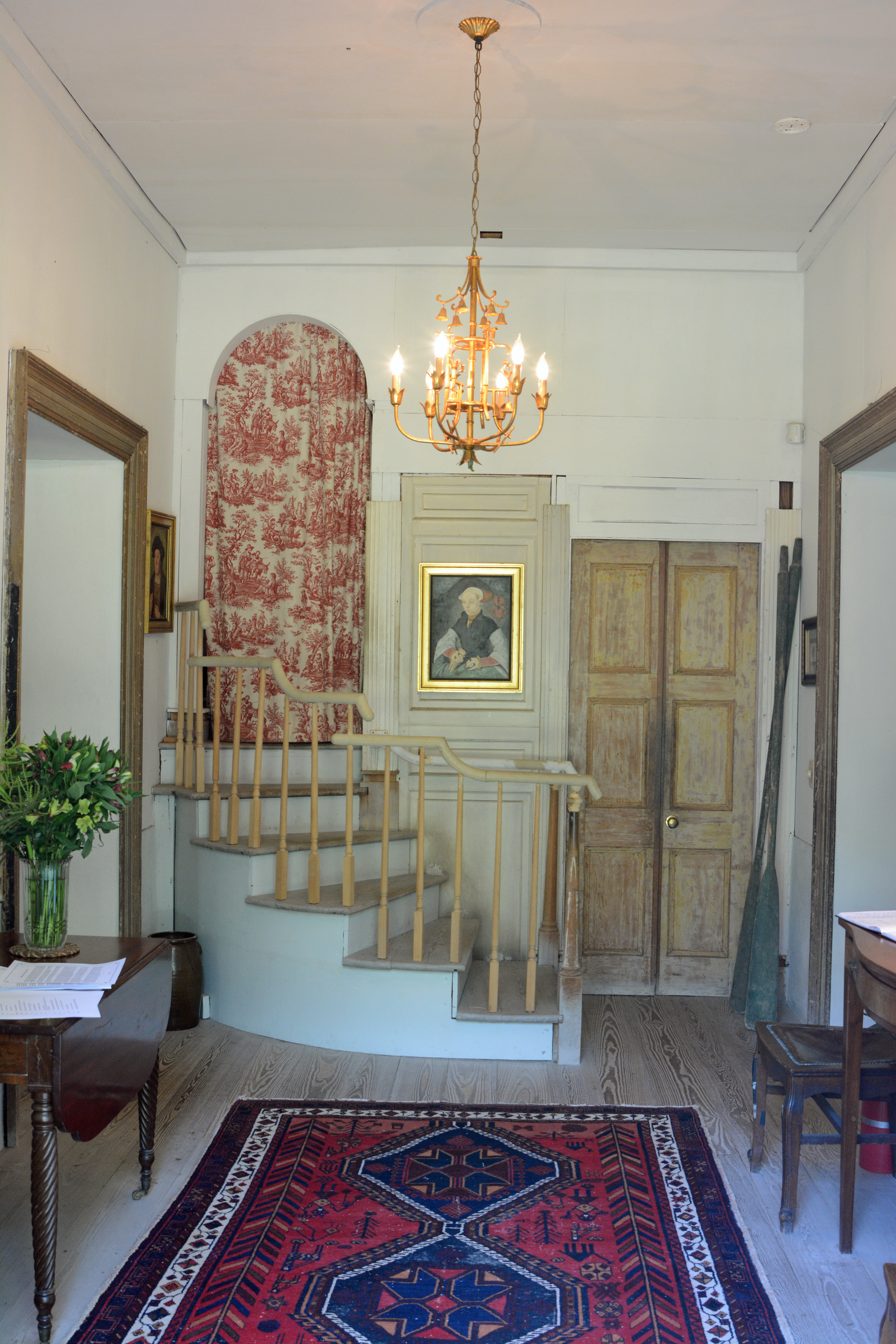
Inside the front door

Ashantilly is a historic house built by Thomas Spalding north of Darien, Georgia. The house is made out of tabby and is also called Old Tabby. The house was named after Ashintully Castle, an ancestral home in Perthshire, Scotland. The construction probably took two or three years and was finished by 1820.

Spalding was a businessman in Darien and inherited property from his mother, Margery McIntosh. He was the owner of the Sapelo Island Plantation.

The Wilcox family bought Ashantilly in 1870 and they made several changes to the house, removing classical columns and marble flagging. The Haynes family moved to the house in 1918. In 1937 the house was gutted by a fire. Restoration of the house started in 1939, using period pieces salvaged in Savannah and Charleston. William Greaner Haynes, Jr. (1908–2001), in 1954, started a private press, the Ashantilly Press, and a building for printing was built on the property. The family donated the property to the Ashantilly Center (a non-profit organization) in 1993.

Ashantilly was added to the National Register of Historic Places on August 25, 2015.
