= McIntosh Sugarworks =

- John Houstoun McIntosh Sugarhouse
- U.S. National Register of Historic Places
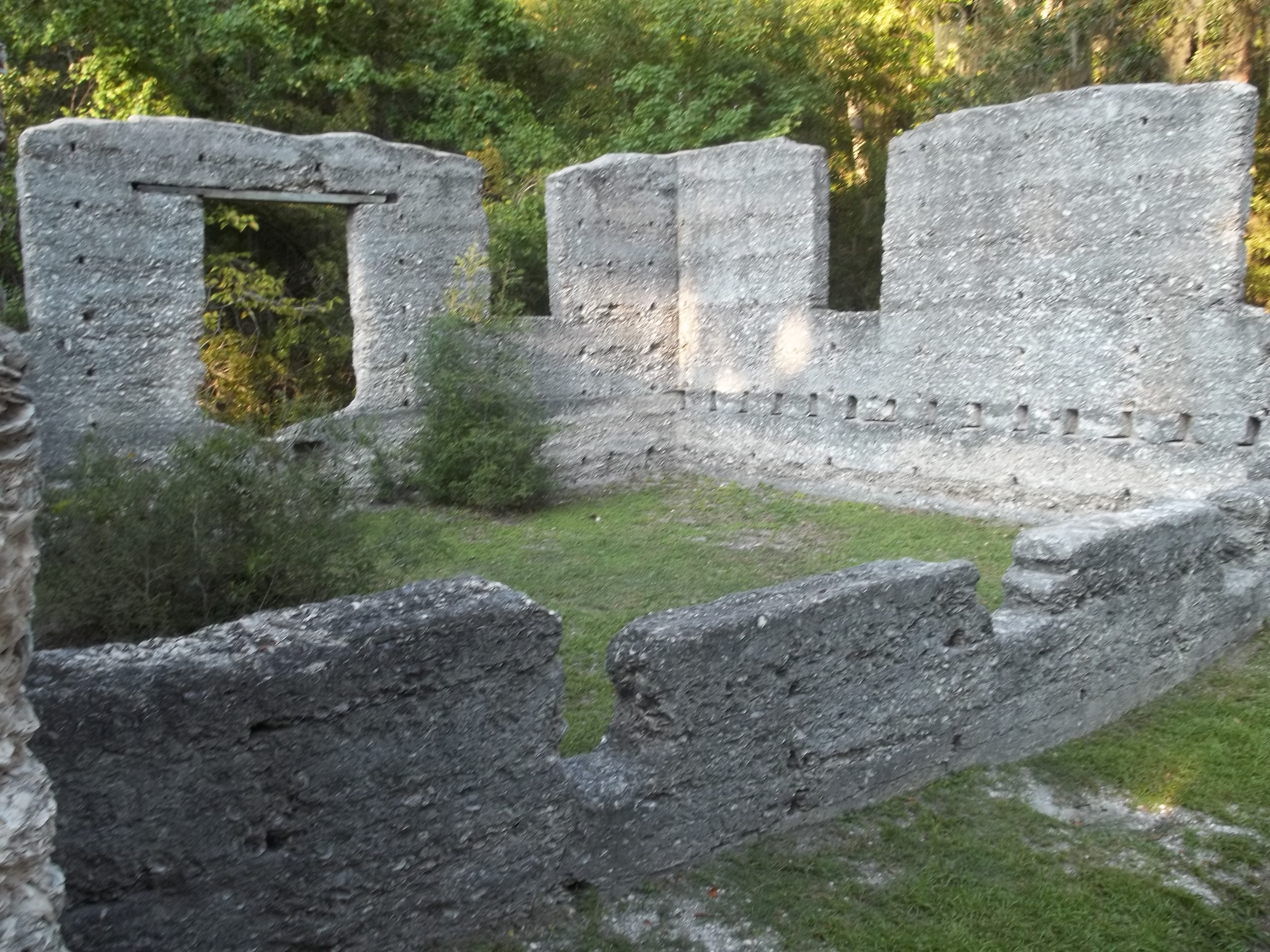
- Ruins on the site

- Location within Georgia Location within the United States
- Location: Ga. Spur 40, 6 mi. N of St. Marys, St. Marys, Georgia
- Coordinates: 30°47′36″N 81°34′44″W
- Area: 1 acre (0.40 ha)
- NRHP reference No.: 92000167
- Added to NRHP: April 2, 1992

The McIntosh Sugarworks, near St. Marys, Georgia, was built in the late 1820s by John Houstoun McIntosh. They are a significant example of tabby concrete architecture and represent an industrial component of southeastern plantation agriculture. The Tabby Ruins, as they are also known, are at 3600 Charlie Smith Sr. Highway at Georgia Spur 40, six miles north of St. Marys. The entrance is approximately across the street from the entrance to the Naval Submarine Base Kings Bay, on Charlie Smith Highway, at 30.79310°N 81.57712°W.

The historic sugar mill site outside of St. Marys, Georgia in Camden County, Georgia was added to the National Register of Historic Places on April 2, 1992.

== History ==
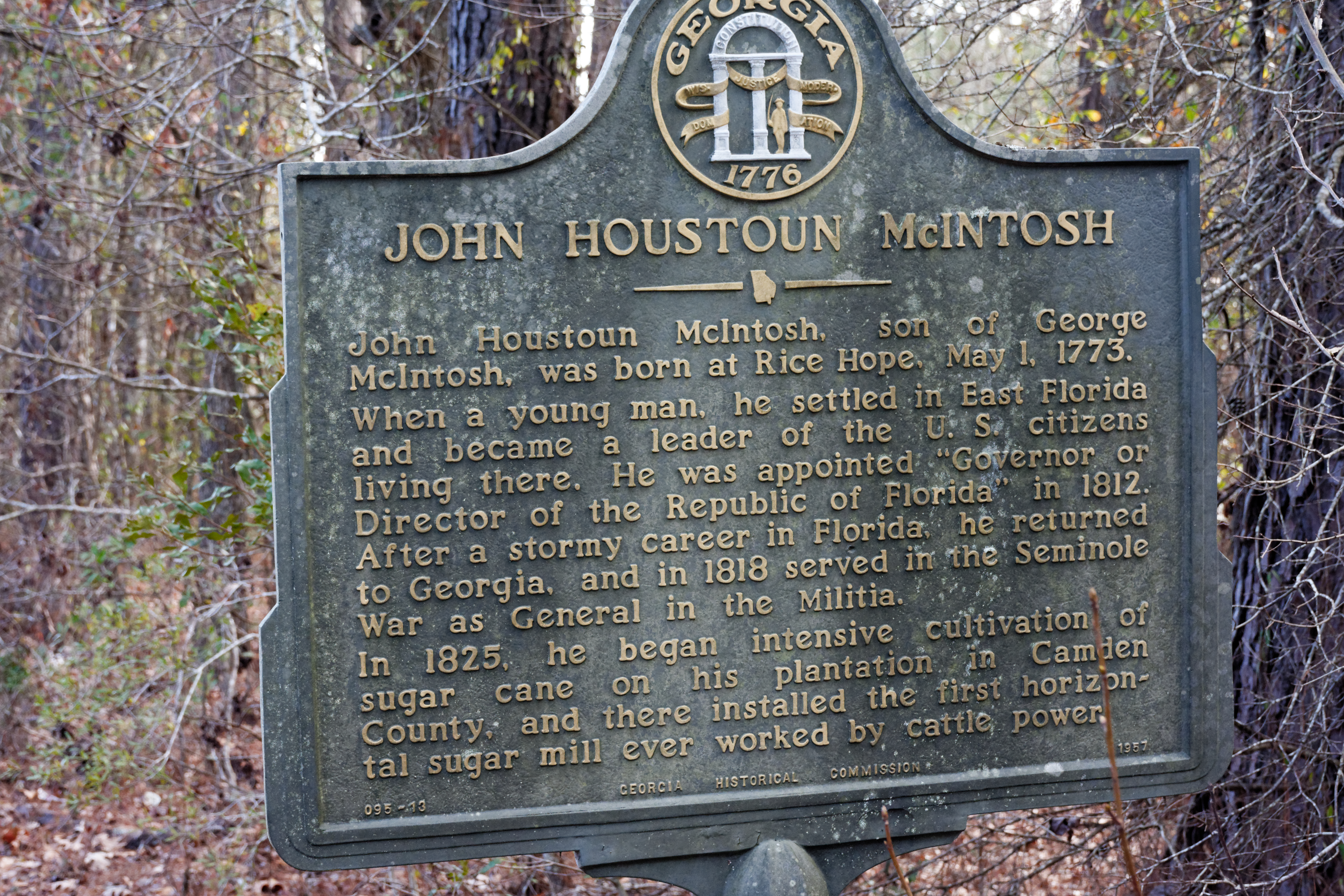
John Houstoun McIntosh marker in McIntosh County, Georgia, USA (not at the Sugarworks)

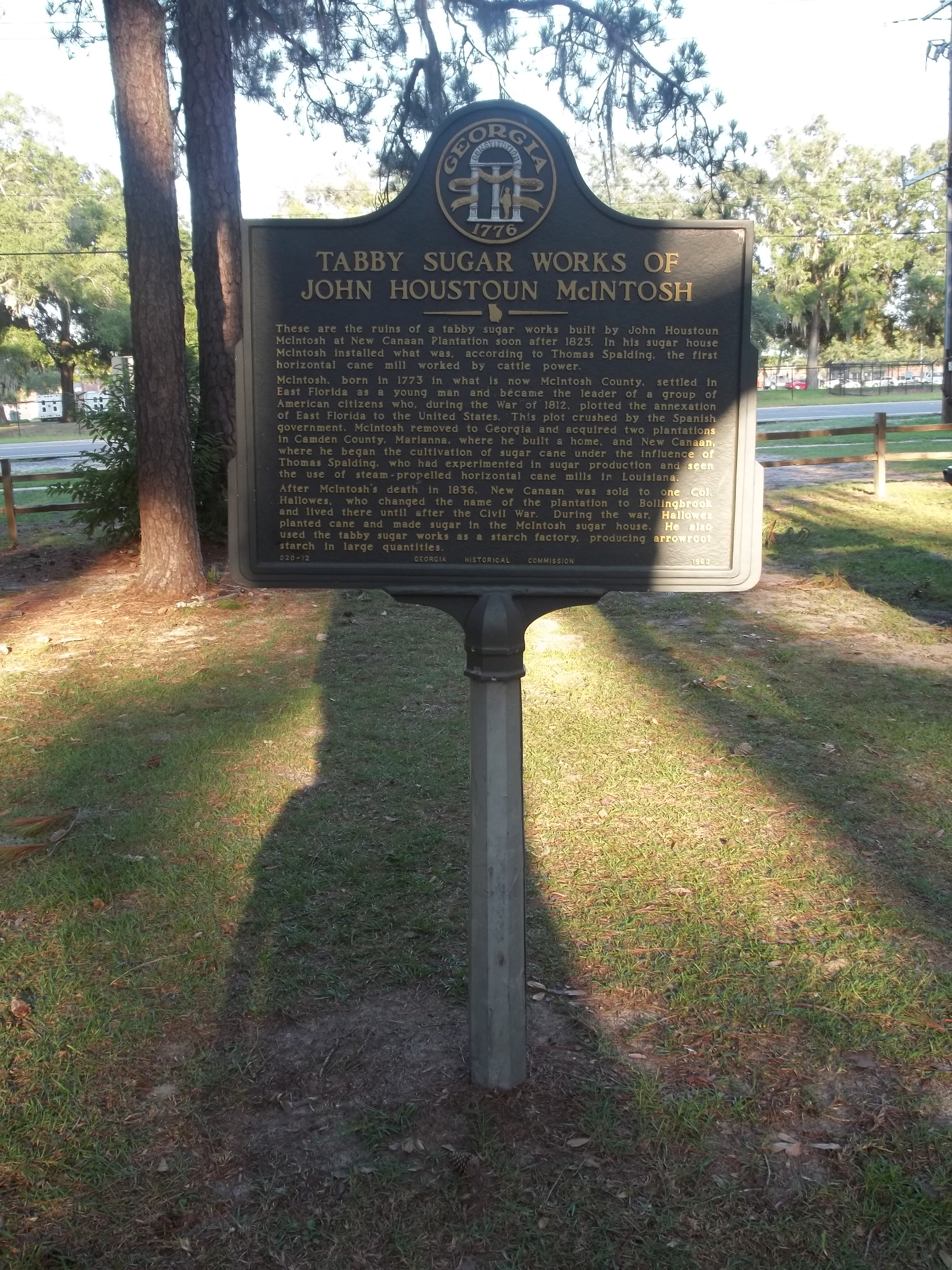
John Houstoun McIntosh Sugarworks historical marker

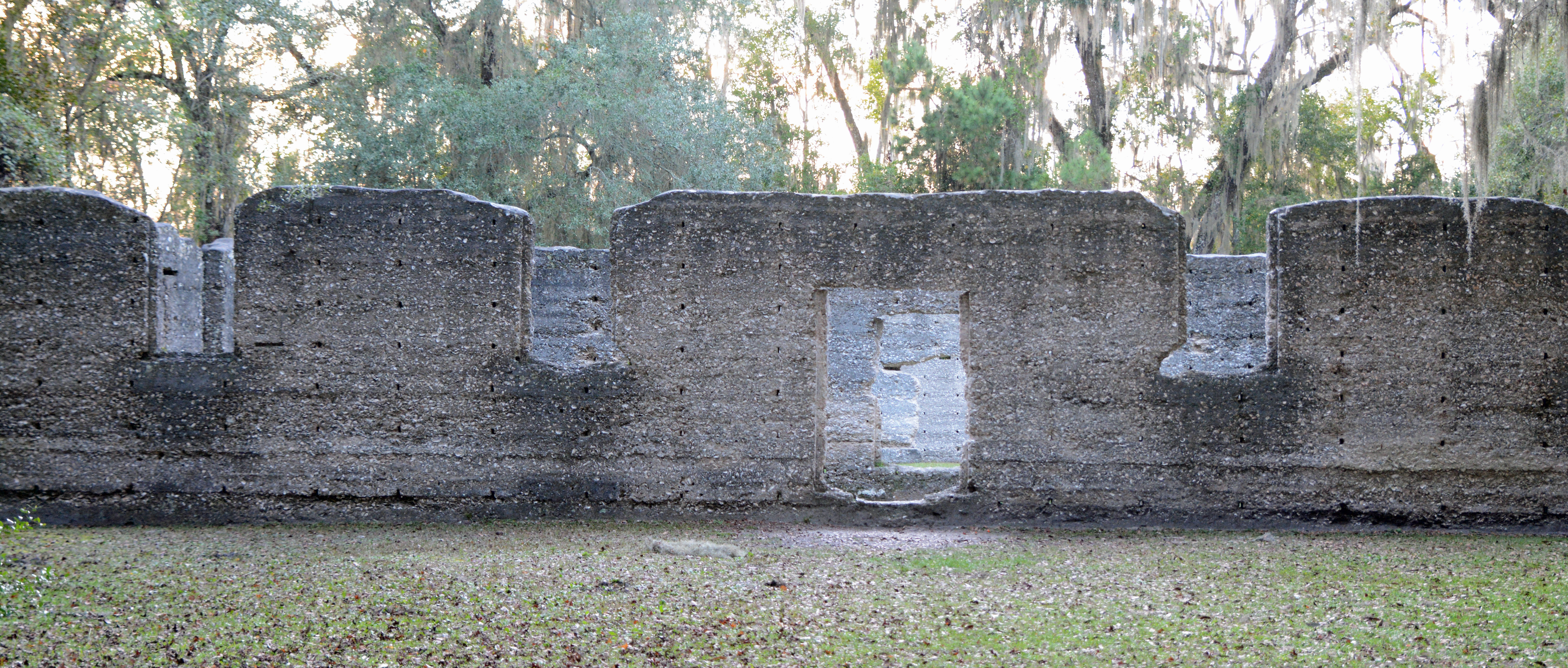
Front side

John Houstoun McIntosh began planting in Camden County, Georgia after the War of 1812, when he established a permanent residence at Mariana Plantation on the St. Marys River. In 1819 he purchased two smaller plantations and renamed his holdings New Canaan. Thomas Spalding recommended a sugar mill design to McIntosh in 1825, and John Hamilton Couper stated the McIntosh mill was already in production by 1829.

After McIntosh's death in 1836, New Canaan was sold to one Caroline Hallowes in 1840. The Hallowes changed the name of the plantation to Bollingbrook and lived there until after the Civil War. During the war, Colonel Hallowes planted cane and made sugar, and also used the tabby sugar works as a starch factory, producing arrowroot starch in large quantities.

For many years it was believed that the "tabby ruins" were the site of an old Spanish mission. Other tabby sugarhouses in the area include that at Elizafield Plantation on St. Simons Island.

== Sugar production at the McIntosh Sugarworks ==
Attempts to grow sugar in North America likely began during the early 1700s. Sugar became an economically successful crop in the southern United States by the end of the eighteenth century. Sugarcane was a lucrative crop, especially for large plantations. At that time in the Georgia lowcountry large-scale planting focused on rice, and comparatively sugar required "a different growing regimen, but not a different kind of plantation." For John Houstoun McIntosh, sugar added an additional cash crop to his plantations without adding much additional cost.

The processing of the sugar was another story, as the large sugarhouse attests. The construction of the sugarhouse alone required a large amount of materials and labor. Thomas Spalding estimated that one enslaved laborer could take cane from two acres in two months. The enslaved people cut the cane, stripped the leaves, and placed it on flat carts which hauled it to the mills.

The standing tabby walls of the sugarhouse define a rectangular building with three rooms aligned in a row, and two porches off the central room. The McIntosh sugar mill's three rooms were each used for a separate step of the process, making sugar production there a streamlined operation. The central room had a packed earth floor, while the two end rooms had wooden floors built off the ground supported by the tabby walls.

The eastern room contained the mill used to crush the cane to extract the sweet juice, according to Thomas Spalding "the first horizontal cane mill worked by cattle power." Horizontal mills were a relatively new innovation in sugar production in the 1820s, and McIntosh's was purchased from the West Point Foundry in New York. The mill room is the only two-story room at the sugarhouse, with the mill being on the second story while the animals which powered it were below.

In the middle room, the extracted juice was boiled and clarified into a syrup. The syrup was then allowed to crystallize into granules and the molasses was drained off. The middle room had an earthen instead of wooden floor due to the high temperatures and open flame used to boil the syrup. The boiling operation there involved multiple kettles that allowed for the different stages of condensing the juice into syrup.

In the last room, the syrup was poured into containers where it was allowed to crystallize into granular sugar. The molasses was then poured out of the finished sugar. Both the sugar crystals and molasses were salable goods and the bagasse could be dried and used to fuel the boiling room or used for animal feed.

== See also ==
- National Register of Historic Places listings in Camden County, Georgia
- Republic of East Florida
