= Allen Bailey =

American football player (1989–2026)

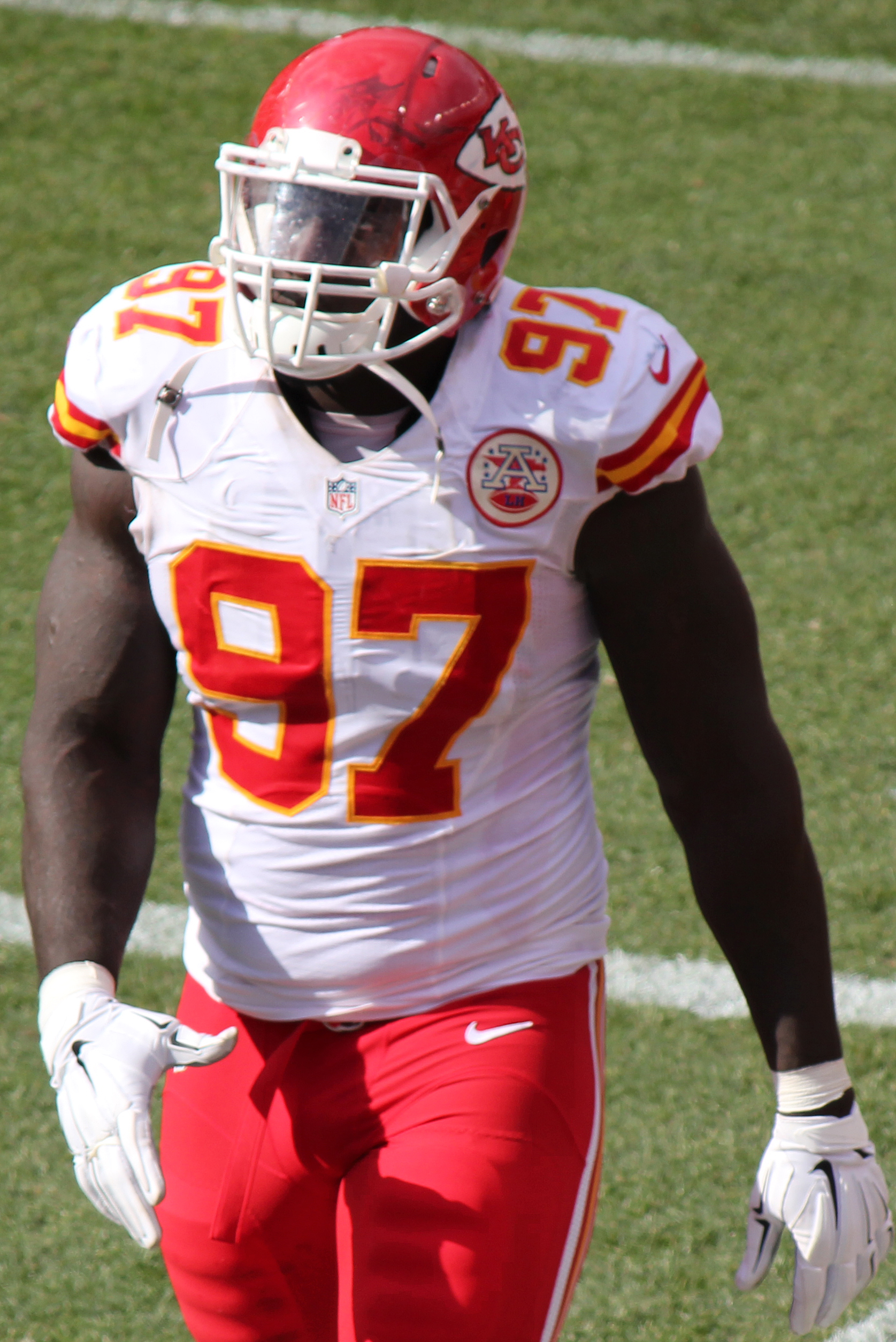
- Bailey with the Kansas City Chiefs in 2014

No. 97, 93
- Position: Defensive end

Personal information
- Born: March 25, 1989; Sapelo Island, Georgia, U.S.
- Died: October 20, 2026 (aged 37); Florida, U.S.
- Listed height: 6 ft 3 in (1.91 m)
- Listed weight: 288 lb (131 kg)

Career information
- High school: McIntosh County Academy (Darien, Georgia)
- College: Miami (FL)
- NFL draft: 2011: 3rd round, 86th overall pick

Career history
- Kansas City Chiefs (2011–2018); Atlanta Falcons (2019–2020)

Awards and highlights
- First-team All-ACC (2009); Second-team All-ACC (2010)

Career NFL statistics
- Total tackles: 248
- Sacks: 22.0
- Forced fumbles: 4
- Fumble recoveries: 7
- Stats at Pro Football Reference

Allen Bailey (March 25, 1989 – October 20, 2026) was an American professional football player who was a defensive end in the National Football League (NFL). He played college football for the Miami Hurricanes.

== Early life ==
Bailey was born in Sapelo Island, Georgia, on March 25, 1989. He attended McIntosh County Academy in McIntosh County, Georgia and played linebacker and fullback. As a senior, he played in only four games due to a stress fracture in his back and had one sack. As a junior, he had 138 tackles and three sacks. He also had 323 yards on 51 carries with four touchdowns as a fullback.

== College career ==
As a University of Miami freshman in 2007, Bailey played in all 12 games, mainly on special teams, but appeared in two games as a linebacker. He finished with four tackles. As a sophomore in 2008 Bailey played in 12 games, starting four at defensive end. He finished the season with 36 tackles and five sacks. As a junior in 2009, Bailey had 24 tackles and seven sacks.

== Professional career ==
=== Pre-draft ===
Pre-draft measurables
| Height | Weight | Arm length | Hand span | Wingspan | 40-yard dash | 10-yard split | 20-yard split | 20-yard shuttle | Three-cone drill | Vertical jump | Broad jump | Bench press |
|---|---|---|---|---|---|---|---|---|---|---|---|---|
| 6 ft 3 in (1.91 m) | 285 lb (129 kg) | 34 in (0.86 m) | 10 1/4 in (0.26 m) | 6 ft 10 1/4 in (2.09 m) | 4.77 s | 1.70 s | 2.82 s | 4.56 s | 7.43 s | 36.5 in (0.93 m) | 9 ft 9 in (2.97 m) | 27 reps |
All values from NFL Combine

At the 2011 NFL Combine, Bailey had the third-highest vertical leap of any defensive lineman, at 36.5".

=== Kansas City Chiefs ===
Bailey was selected in the third round, with the 86th overall pick, of the 2011 NFL draft by the Kansas City Chiefs. Bailey recorded his first sack against the Packers in week 15. Bailey ended his 2011 season with one sack and 10 tackles. He had only five tackles in 10 games in 2012. The 2013 season was a turning point for Bailey after playing in 15 games finishing the year with 30 tackles, a sack, and two batted passes. In 2014, Bailey produced career highs in almost every defensive stat finishing with 41 combined tackles, five sacks, and two passes defended.

On November 15, 2014, the Chiefs signed Bailey to a four-year, $25 million contract extension with $15 million in guaranteed compensation, and a signing bonus of $10 million. He finished 2015 with 38 tackles, 4.5 sacks, and two forced fumbles.

On October 18, 2016, Bailey was placed on injured reserve.

In 2018, Bailey played in all 16 games with 13 starts, recording 38 combined tackles, a career-high six sacks, two forced fumbles, and a league-leading four fumble recoveries.

=== Atlanta Falcons ===
On July 22, 2019, Bailey signed a two-year $10.5 million deal with the Atlanta Falcons. He played in 15 games with five starts, recording 26 tackles and one sack.

On March 25, 2020, Bailey signed a one-year, $4.5 million contract extension through 2021.

The Falcons released Bailey on February 18, 2021.

== Death ==
On October 20, 2026, Bailey was found dead at his Florida home by his wife. He was 37. The cause of death is suspected to be natural causes.

== NFL career statistics ==
Legend
| **Bold** | Career high |

=== Regular season ===
| Year | Team | Games | | Tackles | | | | | Interceptions | | | | | Fumbles | | | |
| Year | Team | GP | GS | Cmb | Solo | Ast | Sck | TFL | Int | Yds | TD | Lng | PD | FF | FR | Yds | TD |
|---|---|---|---|---|---|---|---|---|---|---|---|---|---|---|---|---|---|
| 2011 | KAN | **16** | 0 | 10 | 8 | 2 | 1.0 | 4 | 0 | 0 | 0 | 0 | **2** | 0 | 1 | 0 | 0 |
| 2012 | KAN | 10 | 1 | 5 | 3 | 2 | 0.0 | 0 | 0 | 0 | 0 | 0 | 0 | 0 | 1 | 1 | 0 |
| 2013 | KAN | 15 | 3 | 30 | 25 | 5 | 1.0 | 1 | 0 | 0 | 0 | 0 | **2** | 0 | 0 | 0 | 0 |
| 2014 | KAN | 14 | **14** | **41** | **27** | 14 | 5.0 | **10** | 0 | 0 | 0 | 0 | **2** | 0 | 0 | 0 | 0 |
| 2015 | KAN | 12 | 12 | 38 | 26 | 12 | 4.5 | 7 | 0 | 0 | 0 | 0 | 0 | **2** | 1 | 0 | 0 |
| 2016 | KAN | 5 | 5 | 7 | 5 | 2 | 0.0 | 1 | 0 | 0 | 0 | 0 | 0 | 0 | 0 | 0 | 0 |
| 2017 | KAN | 14 | 13 | 38 | 21 | **17** | 2.0 | 6 | 0 | 0 | 0 | 0 | 0 | 0 | 0 | 0 | 0 |
| 2018 | KAN | **16** | 13 | 38 | **27** | 11 | **6.0** | 5 | 0 | 0 | 0 | 0 | 0 | **2** | **4** | **2** | **1** |
| 2019 | ATL | 15 | 5 | 26 | 14 | 12 | 1.0 | 4 | 0 | 0 | 0 | 0 | 0 | 0 | 0 | 0 | 0 |
| 2020 | ATL | **16** | 4 | 15 | 8 | 7 | 1.5 | 2 | 0 | 0 | 0 | 0 | 0 | 0 | 0 | 0 | 0 |
| | | 133 | 70 | 248 | 164 | 84 | 22.0 | 40 | 0 | 0 | 0 | 0 | 6 | 4 | 7 | 3 | 1 |

=== Playoffs ===
| Year | Team | Games | | Tackles | | | | | Interceptions | | | | | Fumbles | | | |
| Year | Team | GP | GS | Cmb | Solo | Ast | Sck | TFL | Int | Yds | TD | Lng | PD | FF | FR | Yds | TD |
|---|---|---|---|---|---|---|---|---|---|---|---|---|---|---|---|---|---|
| 2013 | KAN | 1 | 0 | 0 | 0 | 0 | 0.0 | 0 | 0 | 0 | 0 | 0 | **1** | 0 | 0 | 0 | 0 |
| 2015 | KAN | **2** | **2** | 4 | **3** | 1 | **2.0** | 0 | 0 | 0 | 0 | 0 | 0 | **2** | 0 | 0 | 0 |
| 2017 | KAN | 1 | 1 | 1 | 0 | 1 | 0.0 | 0 | 0 | 0 | 0 | 0 | 0 | 0 | 0 | 0 | 0 |
| 2018 | KAN | **2** | **2** | **5** | 1 | **4** | 0.0 | 0 | 0 | 0 | 0 | 0 | 0 | 0 | 0 | 0 | 0 |
| | | 6 | 5 | 10 | 4 | 6 | 2.0 | 0 | 0 | 0 | 0 | 0 | 1 | 2 | 0 | 0 | 0 |
