= Amos Rodgers =

American politician

Member of the Georgia House of Representatives from the McIntosh County, Georgia district
- In office 1878–1879

Personal details
- Profession: Politician

Amos Rodgers, often spelled Amos Rogers, was an American politician. He was a state legislator in Georgia. He represented McIntosh County, Georgia from 1878 through 1879.

== See also ==
- African American officeholders from the end of the Civil War until before 1900
