= Republic of East Florida =

Unrecognized proto-state

- 1812
- Flag
- Motto: Salus populi lex suprema (The good of the people is the highest law.)
- Status: Short-lived independent republic
- Capital: Amelia Island, Florida
- Common languages: English; Spanish
- "Governor or Director"
  - 1812: John Houstoun McIntosh
- Chair of the Legislative Council of East Florida
  - 1812: Buckner F. Harris
- Legislature: Legislative Council of East Florida
- History
  - Rebel capture of Amelia Island, Florida: March 17 1812
  - Declaration of independence from Spain: March 17, 1812
  - Ratification of the Constitution of East Florida: July 17, 1812
- Currency: U.S. dollar
Preceded by	Succeeded by
New Spain	United States military occupation; New Spain
- Today part of: United States

The Republic of East Florida, also known as the Republic of Florida or the Territory of East Florida, was an unrecognized proto-state declared by insurgents against the Spanish rule of East Florida, most of whom were from Georgia. John Houstoun McIntosh was chosen as "Director" of the self-named Patriots in March, 1812, to receive formal Spanish capitulation at Amelia Island. In July, while under the occupation of U.S. forces, the Patriots created a constitution of government that provided for an executive office, a legislative council, and a court system. The constitution explicitly stated that East Florida sought annexation by the United States, which reflected the Patriots' goals of joining the U.S. rather than forming an independent republic. Under its provisions on July 27 McIntosh was named "Director of the Territory of East Florida"; he was later succeeded by General Buckner F. Harris. Patriots wished neither independence nor statehood in the United States; they desired annexation by the U.S., connoted by the word "Territory" in their name of the country, and as expressly declared by the delegates at their constitutional convention.

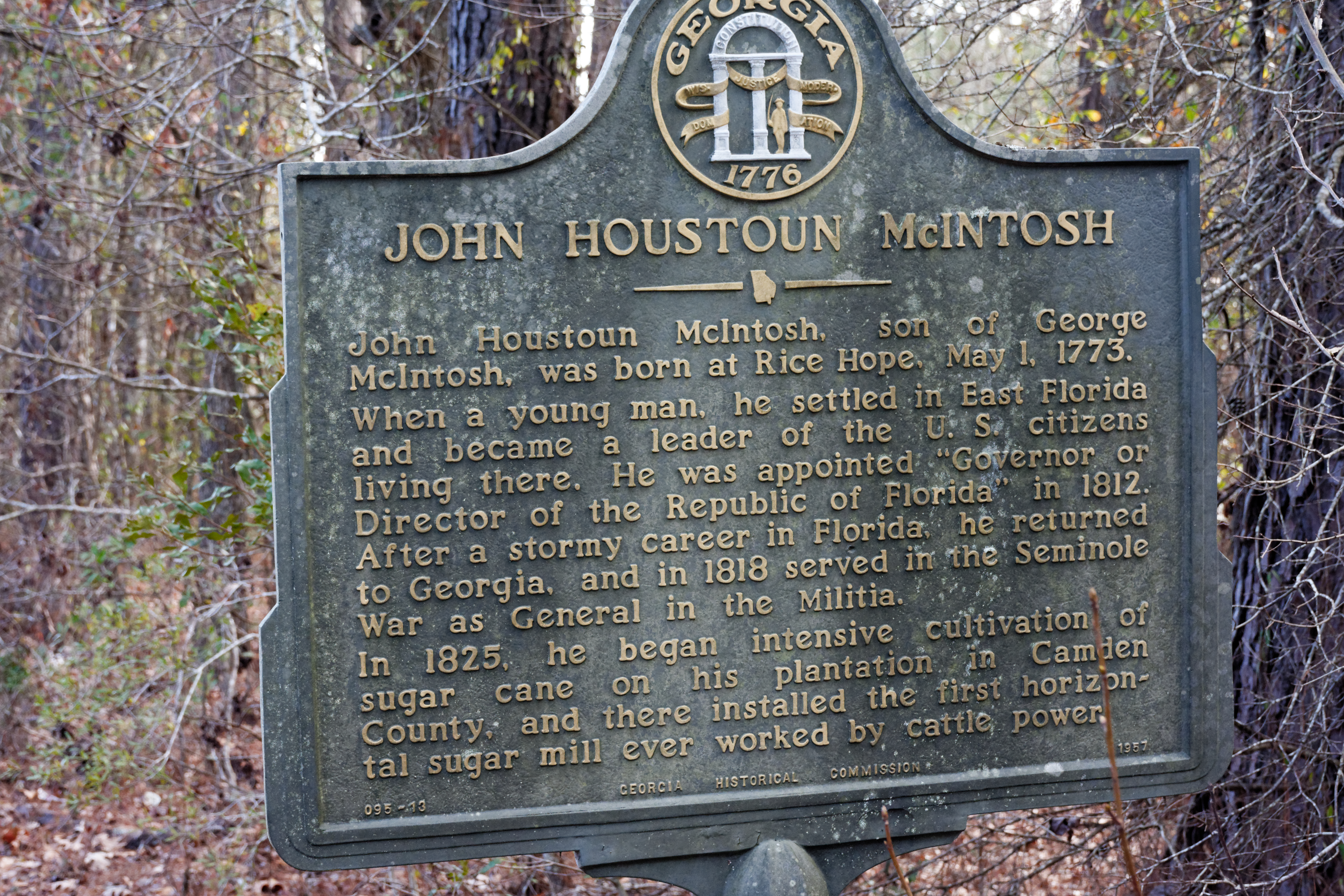
John Houstoun McIntosh marker in McIntosh County, Georgia, commemorating McIntosh's role as the first American "Governor or Director" of the Republic of Florida

== History ==
=== Preceding rebellions ===
The 1795 rebellion established and exposed the longstanding discontent among the settlers and ultimately foreshadowed the tactics that would be used by the Patriots in the rebellion of 1812. The uprising, which was led by local inhabitants dissatisfied with Spanish governance and economic restrictions, demonstrated the division between Spanish loyalists, free settlers, and frontier Americans. Though the revolt was suppressed, it revealed the fragility of Spanish control.

=== General Mathews and Patriots ===
In 1812, General George Mathews and Colonel John McKee were commissioned by President James Madison as agents "with secret instructions 'to repair to that quarter with all possible expedition', for the purpose of carrying out the intentions of the act" (i.e., a secret Act of Congress on January 15, 1811) and to approach the Spanish governor in an attempt to acquire East Florida. Their instructions were to take possession of any part of the territory of the Floridas upon making "arrangement" with the "local authority" to deliver possession to the U.S. Barring that and an attempted occupation by any foreign government, they were not to take possession of any part of Florida.

Mathews and McKee desired to annex East Florida to the United States under the context of the local independence that was occurring, which blurred the lines of rebellion and invasion. Acting under ambiguous federal instruction, they coordinated with Patriots to stage an uprising that would justify U.S. intervention while maintaining plausible deniability.

McKee recused himself, while Mathews proceeded on the mission to East Florida and moved into a house at St. Marys, Georgia. Being unable to satisfy his instructions straightforwardly, he schemed to organize a rebel group to seize the local governing authority. However, the local inhabitants had little cause for complaint toward the Spanish government, as the province was enjoying prosperity from the markets in cotton and timber, with prices high and demand increasing. The town of Fernandina on Amelia Island was a neutral or free port at which a large and lucrative trade was carried on with many nations. It was also a center of the illicit trade of cotton with Great Britain and smuggling in general. A revolution at this time was not to rise organically among the inhabitants.

Instead, Mathews set about recruiting leaders of a rebellion among the frontier inhabitants in the northern part of the province, mostly Georgia militiamen, wood-choppers and boatmen from the neighborhood of St. Marys. During this period, U.S. officials increasingly viewed East Florida as strategically important to national expansion, paralleling American ambitions in West Florida and later Texas. Many enslaved and free Black residents, including Black Seminoles, opposed the Patriot movement because they feared that U.S. annexation would expand slavery and remove protections available under Spanish rule. Indigenous communities also resisted the movement, anticipating increased land loss and military pressure if the United States gained control. Historians emphasize that the rebellion did not originate organically within East Florida but was heavily shaped by U.S. agents pursuing territorial acquisition. Patriot leaders were supported by slave-holding planters who wanted to stop raiding parties of Seminole Indians from the Alachua region and feared the presence of armed free black militias in Spanish Florida. Mathews persuaded their leaders that he had the full authorization of a United States government that was determined to take possession of East Florida. Mathews not only promised arms and the support of the U.S. military to the rebels in order to wrest control of the Spanish fort at Fernandina but also to defend the territory once they, as the new local authority, ceded it to the United States.

On March 14, 1812, the self-named "Patriots of Amelia Island" armed and assembled on the Florida side of the St. Mary's River. They selected temporary officers under the supervision of Gen. Mathews. Accounts of the group's size range from 250 to 357, but only a small number were Spanish subjects. On March 16, nine American gunboats under the command of Commodore Hugh Campbell lined up in the harbor at Fernandina with guns aimed at the town as cover for the Patriot volunteers. Gen. Mathews, still ensconced at Point Peter on the St. Marys River in Georgia, demanded that Justo López, commandant of Fort San Carlos and Amelia Island, surrender. López acknowledged the superior force and surrendered the port and the town. On March 17, John H. McIntosh, representing the Patriots, and George J. F. Clarke and Justo López, representing the Spanish government, signed the articles of capitulation; the Patriots then raised their own standard. The next day, a detachment of 250 regular United States troops were brought over from Point Peter, and the Patriots surrendered the town to Gen. Mathews, who had the U.S. flag raised immediately. As agreed, the Patriots held Fernandina for only one day before turning authority over to the U.S. military, an event that soon gave the U.S. control of the coast to St. Augustine.

Within several days the Patriots, along with a regiment of regular Army troops and Georgian volunteers, moved toward St. Augustine. On this march the Patriots were slightly in advance of the American troops. The Patriots would proclaim possession of some ground, raise the Patriot flag, and as the "local authority" surrender the territory to the United States troops, who would then substitute the American flag for the Patriot flag. The Patriots faced no opposition as they marched, usually with Gen. Mathews. Accounts of witnesses state that the Patriots could have made no progress but for the protection of the U.S. forces and could not have maintained their position in the country without the aid of the U.S. troops. The American troops and Patriots acted in close concert, marching, camping, foraging and fighting together. In this way, the American troops sustained the Patriots. Despite their early successes, the Patriot leadership was divided over goals, strategy, and how closely they should align with United States military forces. These internal disputes weakened the movement and created uncertainty about who held legitimate authority in the occupied territories. Contemporary scholars note that many Patriots expected sustained U.S. military support that ultimately did not materialize, leaving them vulnerable once federal officials withdrew backing. This instability within the Patriot ranks contributed significantly to the collapse of the campaign and its inability to secure lasting control over East Florida.

As soon as the U.S. government was notified of these events, Congress became alarmed at the possibility of being drawn into war with Spain, and the effort fell apart. Secretary of State James Monroe promptly disavowed the actions and relieved Gen. Mathews of his commission on May 9, on the grounds that neither of the instructed contingencies had occurred. Monroe ordered the withdrawal of American troops with instructions "to restore back to the Spanish authorities Amelia Island and such other posts of East Florida as had been thus taken from them". In his letter, Monroe wrote, in regard to the forcible taking of Spanish territory, "I forbear to dwell on the details of this transaction because it is too painful to recite them."

However, negotiations with the Spanish authorities were protracted and slow. Through the summer and autumn, the U.S. and Patriot troops foraged and plundered almost every plantation and farm, most of them having been abandoned by their owners. The troops helped themselves to everything they could find. Stored food was used up, growing crops destroyed or fed to horses, all types of movable property plundered or destroyed, buildings and fences burned, cattle and hogs killed or stolen for butchering, and slaves often dispersed or abducted. This continued until May 1813 and left the formerly inhabited parts in a state of desolation.

Negotiations concluded for the withdrawal of U.S. troops in 1813. Modern interpretations place the Patriot War within a broader pattern of early U.S. expansionism driven by diplomatic pressure, covert operations, and frontier militarism. The U.S. government's fluctuating support illustrated the delicate balance between territorial ambition and the desire to avoid provoking a formal war with Spain. Scholars argue that the failed occupation of East Florida foreshadowed later American interventions in regions such as Texas, where settlers similarly relied on unofficial federal encouragement. These reassessments broaden historical understanding of the Patriot War by situating it within long-term strategies of U.S. territorial expansion. On May 6, 1813, the army lowered the flag at Fernandina and crossed the St. Marys River to Georgia with the remaining troops. Spain took possession of the redoubt at Fort San Carlos and regained control of the region.

=== Elotchaway ===
On January 10, 1814, Gen. Buckner Harris of Georgia led a group of volunteers to the former site of Paynes Town, home of the leader of the Alachua band of Seminoles, King Payne, which had been burned down by the United States troops in 1813. This site was located a considerable distance inland, southwest of St. Augustine and south of present-day Gainesville. There they constructed a small blockhouse they called Fort Mitchell after the former governor of Georgia, David Mitchell. The settlers met as a legislative assembly on January 25, 1814, and declared the area to be the "District of Elotchaway of the Republic of East Florida". President James Madison officially refused to recognize the Republic of East Florida on April 19, 1814, a devastating blow to the hopes of the Patriots. Meanwhile, the Spanish governor, Sebastián Kindelán, placed a bounty on Harris to reward the Seminoles for collecting his scalp. On May 5, 1814, they ambushed, killed and scalped Harris. His murder left the Patriots leaderless and terminated the attempt to resurrect a Republic of East Florida.

=== Constitution and Government Structure (1812) ===
The constitution combined both American republican concepts with Spanish colonial administration, indicating the hybrid nature of the Republic. It established a director as the executive authority and a Legislative Council that was modeled after U.S. republican ideals. It also followed Spanish governance through the recognition of Catholicism and the preservation of traditional land laws.

=== End of rebellion ===
The white population of East Florida, outside of St. Augustine, consisted of a few hundred persons scattered along the St. Johns, Nassau, and St. Marys Rivers. The revolution affected a narrow strip of settled territory along the east coast of Florida, north of St. Augustine, about sixty miles long by fifteen to twenty in width. After the Spanish reoccupation in 1813, Governor Kindelán established three local governing districts under the Spanish Constitution of 1812 in this strip of territory. They were Fernandina (Amelia, Tiger, and Talbot Islands, both banks of the Nassau River and the south bank of the St. Marys, bordering the U.S.), Upper St. Johns (along the upper part of that river) and Lower St. Johns (everything downriver, including San Pablo Inlet and Fort George Island). He appointed a capitán de partido (equivalent to a constable and justice of the peace) to serve in each district, with small detachments of troops.

In the St. Johns River districts, this system lasted until the end of Spanish rule in Florida, but not in the territory along and between the Nassau and St. Marys Rivers, where trouble involving the malcontents continued until 1816. Vignoles described the three years that followed the resumption of hostilities in August, 1813, as a time of anarchy and desolation, in contrast to the stated purpose in the Patriots' failed constitution "that a Government should be established in this Province to prevent anarchy and confusion".

In the state of anarchy endemic to the area, civil disturbances were prevalent, and the rebellion begun in 1812 persisted, with hostility directed at the Spanish authorities on Amelia Island. In 1816, Governor Coppinger sent Clarke, Zephaniah Kingsley, and Henry Yonge, Jr. to parley with the malcontents and negotiate an agreement by which the hostility might cease. The three commissioners met forty "people of the main" at Mill's Ferry on the St. Marys and arranged for a general meeting of the men of the region to be convened at Waterman's Bluff in three weeks. Clarke and the other two commissioners went to the meeting and offered a "plan of reconciliation and re-establishment of order", proposing that the malcontents accept Spanish rule under a plan that divided the territory between the St. Marys and St. Johns into three self-governing districts, to be known as Upper St. Marys, Lower St. Marys, and Nassau (Amelia Island). Each district was to have a magistrate's court and its own militia, the officers to be elected by the people. The group accepted these conditions, and Clarke's plan was adopted.

=== Legacy and scholarly debate ===
Recent scholars have argued that the Republic’s creation was less focused on self-determination and more on advancing U.S. geopolitical ambitions. Kotlik’s analysis of Spanish correspondence shows consistent skepticism among Spanish officials, many of whom interpreted the rebellion as a covert extension of American territorial aims. He also notes that the Patriots depended heavily on U.S. military aid, supplies, and political backing, reinforcing the argument that the Republic functioned as a strategic tool for pressuring Spain during ongoing border disputes.

=== Flag ===
East Florida Patriot flag

On March 14, 1812, a group of men calling themselves the "Patriots" assembled at Rose's Bluff, across the river from St. Marys, and raised their standard of revolt against the Spanish government of East Florida. This was a flag designed by Colonel Ralph Isaacs, Mathew's aide-de-camp, with a white field on which the blue figure of a soldier was depicted charging with his bayonet. Beneath him was the Latin motto: Salus populi lex suprema (The safety of the people, the supreme law).

== See also ==
- Amelia Island affair
