= Thomas Spalding =

American politician

Member of the United States House of Representatives
- In office December 24, 1805 – November 1806
- Preceded by: Cowles Mead
- Succeeded by: William Wyatt Bibb

Personal details
- Born: March 25, 1774 Frederica, Province of Georgia
- Died: January 4, 1851 (aged 76) Darien, Georgia
- Party: Democratic-Republican Party
- Spouse: Sarah Leake (m. 1795; died 1843)
- Children: Jane Martin Spalding (1796–1861); James Spalding (1797–1820); Margaret Spalding (1800–1800); Hester Margery (1801–1824); Mary Ann Elizabeth Spalding (1803–1818); Margery Spalding (1804-); Elizabeth Sarah Spalding (1806–1876); Charles Harris Spalding (1808–1887); Katherine Spalding (1810–1881); Thomas Spalding (1813–1819); Emily Screven Spalding (1817–1819); Randolph Spalding (1822–1862)
- Parent(s): James Spalding; Margery McIntosh
- Relatives: John McIntosh Kell (great nephew)
- Occupation: Planter; Agriculturist

Thomas Spalding (March 25, 1774 – January 4, 1851) was a United States representative from Georgia. He was born in Frederica, Georgia, St. Simons Island, Glynn County, Georgia. He studied law and was admitted to the bar in 1795, but did not practice. He engaged extensively in agricultural pursuits and is widely known for owning slaves.

== Early life ==
Thomas Spalding was born March 25, 1774, at Frederica on St. Simons Island to James Spalding and Margery McIntosh. His father was one of the earliest planters to experiment with growing Sea Island Cotton. His father was part of Clan Spalding and traced his ancestry back to the lairds of Ashintully Castle. Thomas Spalding would later in life name his Darien, Georgia mansion after his ancestral Scottish home. Spalding's father was an Indian trader, planter, and held a number of political posts prior to the American Revolution. His mother was part of the McIntosh family who helped establish Darien, Georgia. He was their only child. Spalding's father was a Loyalist during the American Revolution and moved the family to East Florida when the war broke out. Thomas Spalding attended the common schools of Georgia and Florida and later a private school in Massachusetts. James Spalding's property was temporarily confiscated during the war, but was returned to him after he petitioned the legislature. By the 1790s, James Spalding became the richest man in Glynn County, Georgia. James Spalding died in 1794, and Thomas Spalding inherited the entirety of his father's estate. On November 5, 1795, he married Sarah Leake. She was the only daughter of Richard Leak, a wealthy planter who owned neighboring Jekyll Island.

== Political career ==
Spalding's political career began when he served as a member of Georgia House of Representatives from 1794 to 1795. In 1795, he was admitted to the bar after studying law; however, he never practiced professionally. He then served as a member of the state constitutional convention in 1798. He was a member of the Georgia State Senate in 1799. Shortly after his term ended, Spalding, his wife, his mother, and his friend Joseph Bryan traveled for 18 months in England, Scotland, and France. He served another term in the Georgia State Senate from 1803 to 1804. In 1804, Spalding ran for one of Georgia's four at-large seats for the 9th United States Congress as a Democratic-Republican candidate alongside his friend Joseph Bryan. In early September 1804 a hurricane devastated the coast of Georgia. The hurricane delayed the results of Liberty County, Tattnall County, and Camden County from reaching the state capital at Louisville, Georgia, in time. By the initial tabulation of the votes, Spalding came in fifth place 169 votes behind Cowles Mead. If the votes from the three counties with late returns were counted, Spalding would have a 38 vote majority over Mead. Georgia Governor John Milledge issued a certificate of election to Mead, who was seated in March 1805. Later that year, Spalding went to Washington and contested the election results. In December 1805, Congress voted that Spalding was entitled to the seat held by Mead, and was sworn in on December 24, 1805. While in Congress, Spalding was made chairman of a committee to investigate the boundary dispute between Georgia and North Carolina. His vote against the Non-importation Act was criticized by his constituents. Spalding stopped attending Congress on April 12 with nine days left in the session. With the elections in October 1806 indicating that he would not be elected for 10th United States Congress, Spalding resigned his seat in early November 1806 before the second session met. His resignation led to a special election that December. He served as a trustee of the McIntosh County Academy in 1807. Spalding served as a member of the Georgia House of Representatives from 1808 to 1810, and as a member of the Georgia State Senate from 1813 to 1814.

He was one of the founders of the Bank of Darien and of the branch in Milledgeville, Georgia, and president for many years. In 1815, he was sent as a government commissioner to the British colony of Bermuda to negotiate compensation related to claims of lost or damaged property by American citizens as a result of the War of 1812.

== Sapelo Island plantation ==
In 1802, Spalding sold his plantation on St. Simons Island and began purchasing land on Sapelo Island. By the time of his death in 1851, Spalding and his family owned all of Sapelo Island with the exception of 650 acres at Raccoon bluff. While primarily known for his Sapelo Island plantation, Spalding also owned real estate and plantations elsewhere in Georgia. In 1822, he purchased Hutchinson Island across the Savannah River from Savannah, Georgia along with 125 slaves to work the rice fields on the island. He later sold his Hutchinson Island property in the 1840s. He also owned a plantation on Black Island near Darien, Georgia. Soon after purchasing his Sapelo Island plantation, Spalding hired Roswell King to be the overseer of the crew of slaves that were to construct a mansion on the south end of Sapelo Island. The mansion completed in 1810, known as South End House, would go on to survive being damaged by a destructive hurricane in 1824 before being heavily damaged during the American Civil War. Decades later, the mansion was repaired and enlarged later by a later owner Howard E. Coffin and then again by R. J. Reynolds Jr. The mansion is currently owned by the state of Georgia and is now commonly referred to as the Reynolds Mansion.

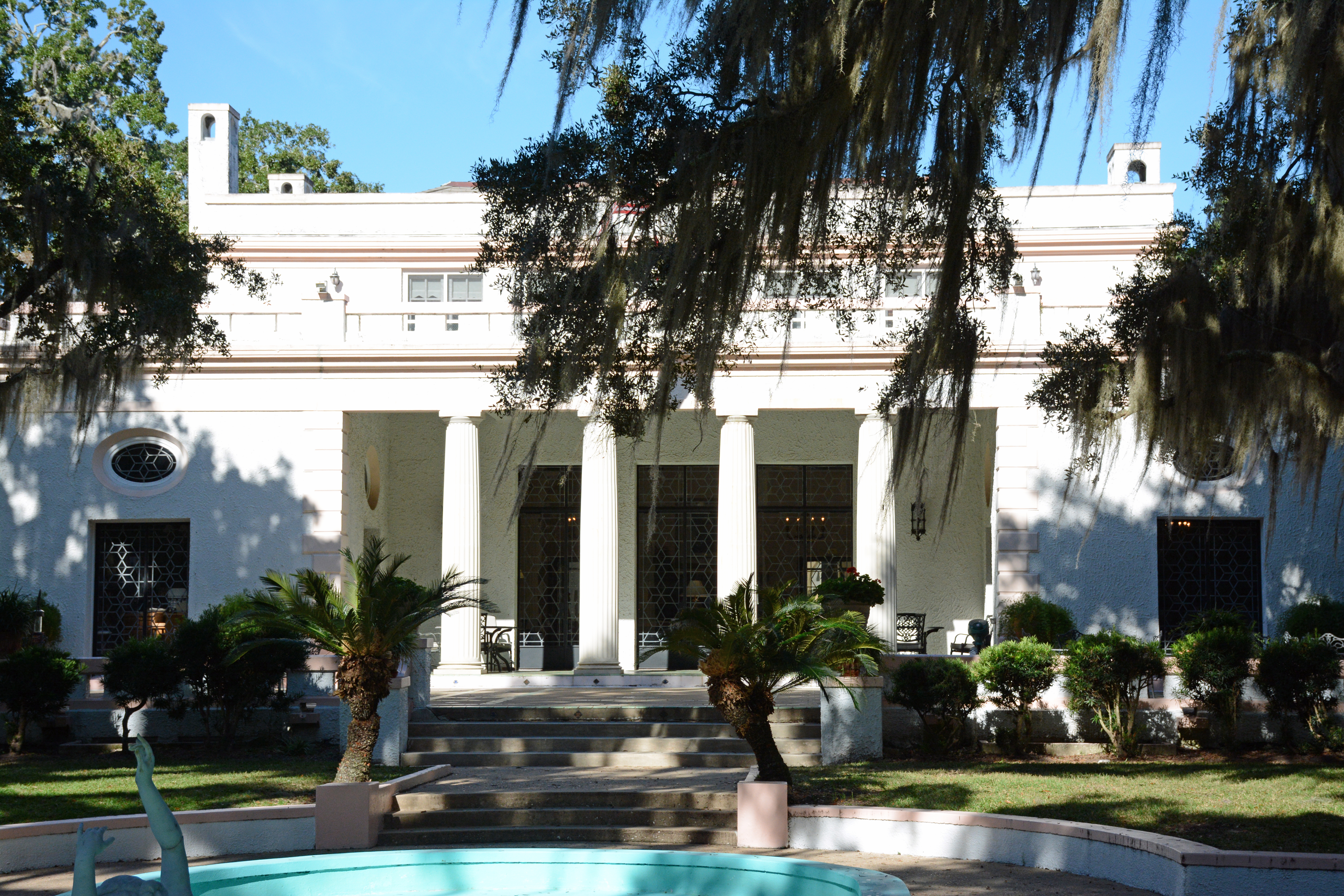
The R. J. Reynolds mansion uses the original exterior walls of Thomas Spalding's 1810 mansion

Thomas Spalding was also noted for his scientific approach to agriculture and was a frequent contributor to The Southern Agriculturist, The American Agriculturist, and The Southern Cultivator In order to further the study of agricultural science, Spalding became one of the founders of the Union Agricultural Society of Georgia in 1824 and was its first president. He thoroughly believed that knowledge of improvements in agricultural science should be freely shared.

Spalding engaged in the cultivation of a wide variety of crops on his Sapelo Island plantation. He was noted for being one of the largest producers of Sea Island Cotton in the state and wrote extensively on its cultivation and its history. Rice was also grown on his Sapelo Island plantation, but not to the same extent as sea island cotton. Spalding is credited with introducing the sugarcane cultivation to Georgia in 1805. Sugarcane had previously been grown for profit in Louisiana, but prior to Spalding, Georgia had been considered too cold of a climate for growing sugarcane. Due to Spalding's advocacy, sugarcane cultivation soon spread to many other plantations in coastal Georgia and inland along the banks of the Altamaha River. Spalding constructed a number of sugar mills on his Sapelo Island plantation. All were built with tabby walls. His earlier mill was powered by oxen. A sugar mill built in the 1830s was tidal powered. The ruins of his sugar mills are still visible.

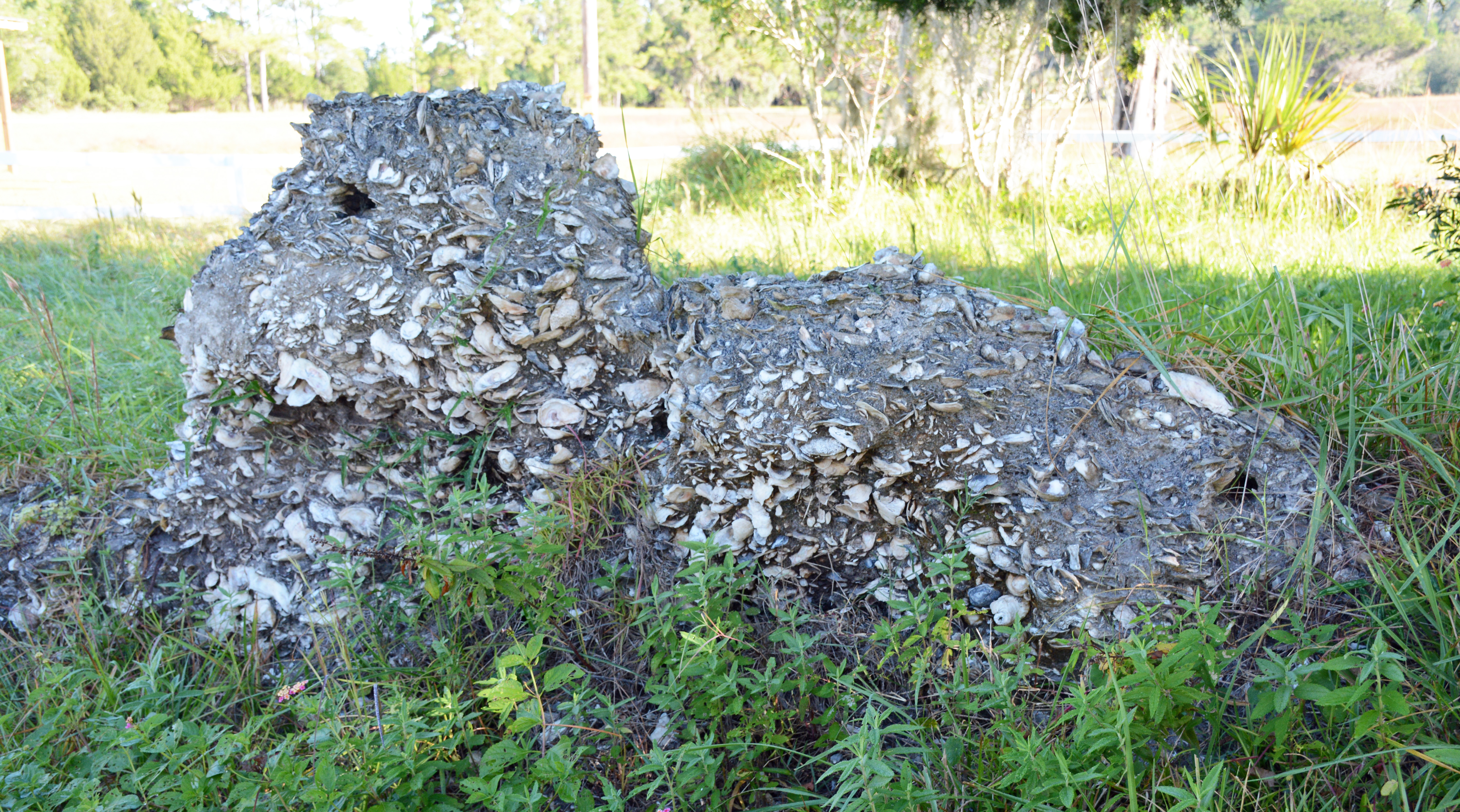
Tabby ruins of Spalding's 1809 sugar mill

By the late 1820s, Spalding began to advocate for crop diversification as a way to combat the collapse in market prices of staple crops like cotton and rice. He began calling for a resurgence in the cultivation of indigo and silk in Georgia. Both crops had been profitable during the colonial period. He gave thousands of mulberry tree saplings away to new neighbors between 1837 and 1838 in order to increase silk cultivation. He experienced moderate success with the production of wine. Spalding also cultivated olive trees on Sapelo Island that he had imported from the Province of Livorno in Italy, but had limited success.

In 1803 a group of 75 captive Igbo people, that had been procured for Spalding and a neighboring planter John Couper, rebelled against being forced into slavery. Twelve of them committed mass suicide by drowning at what would come to be called Igbo Landing on St. Simons Island. Some of the survivors were brought to Spalding's Sapelo Island plantation.

Spalding was an advocate of the task system of slave labor as he believed it allowed for his slaves to be more self-reliant. After the first few years of operating his plantation on Sapelo Island, Spalding switched from using white overseers to exclusively slave overseers. He summarized his theory of running his plantations as ideally being "without the interference of white man." Spalding housed his slaves in small village communities known as "hammocks" in which slaves of similar ethnic backgrounds lived together. He believed that type of community organization would better acclimate to slavery the newly enslaved people he purchased at Charleston, South Carolina, who were just arriving from Africa. In 1830, he owned 400 slaves. In 1840, he owned 348 slaves. In 1850, he owned 293 slaves. Spalding's primary slave overseer was a slave named Bilali Mohammet (sometimes referred to as Bu Allah). Bilali was an African Muslim born in Timbo Guinea between 1760 and 1779. Accounts differ about when Bilali was taken from Africa to the Americas, but Spalding seems to have purchased him about 1802. During the War of 1812, Spalding placed Bilali in charge of training other slaves with muskets to aid in the defense of Sapelo Island in the event of a British invasion. At some point during his enslavement on Sapelo Island, Bilali wrote what is now referred to as the Bilali Document, a manuscript on West African Islamic law written in Arabic.

== Later life ==
In 1826 he was appointed by the State of Georgia to represent Georgia's interests during the surveying done to determine the boundary line between Georgia and the Territory of Florida. This required Spalding, Thomas Mann Randolph, and a team of men to travel from Ellicott's Mound at the headwaters of the St. Marys River in the Okefenokee Swamp through the frontier of South Georgia and onwards to Tallahassee, Florida.

Spalding was also involved with the Ocmulgee and Flint Railroad. He 1827, he gained a charter from the state of Georgia for the construction of a railroad from navigable water of the Ocmulgee River and Flint River. Construction of the railroad began on the banks of the Ocmulgee River in the 1830s at Mobley's Bluff in modern Ben Hill County, Georgia. A town was surveyed at the bluff and named Spalding in his honor. Abbott Hall Brisbane was appointed chief engineer for the railroad by the board of directors. Financial setbacks plagued the railroad. By the 1840s, the path of the railroad was graded most of the way from Spalding to Albany, Georgia. In September 1843, construction of the railroad ended when the workers constructing the route mutinied. In the 1830s he began working on a biography of James Oglethorpe, which was published in 1840 by the Georgia Historical Society. He was a president of the convention at Milledgeville, Georgia, in 1850, which resolved that the State of Georgia would resist any act of Congress abolishing slavery. He died in 1851, while en route home, at the residence of his son near Darien, Georgia, named Ashantilly. He was buried in St. Andrew's Cemetery.

== Legacy ==
- Thomas Spalding is the namesake to Spalding County, Georgia.
- Palestine Lake in Florida was originally named Lake Spalding by John McBride the surveyor for the 1826 Georgia-Florida boundary line.

== See also ==
- Ashantilly
- Behavior Cemetery
- Bilali Document
- Igbo Landing
- McIntosh Sugarworks
- Sapelo Island

U.S. House of Representatives
Preceded by Cowles Mead	Member of the U.S. House of Representatives from Georgia's at-large congressional district December 24, 1805 – November 1806	Succeeded by William Wyatt Bibb
