= Barbour Island =

Coordinates: 31°34′53″N 81°13′43″W

Barbour Island is an island in McIntosh County, in the U.S. state of Georgia.

Variant names are 'Barber's Island", "Barbers Island", and "Barbours Island". Barbour Island most likely derives its name from John Barber, an 18th-century pioneer settler.
