= Hird Island =

Island in McIntosh County, Georgia, United States

- Location within Georgia
- Interactive map of Hird Island

Geography
- Location: Atlantic Ocean
- Coordinates: 31°23′32″N 81°22′48″W

Administration
- United States
- State: Georgia
- County: McIntosh County

Hird Island is a private island located in McIntosh County, Georgia. It was historically used for the harvesting of lumber during the lumber boom of Georgia in the 1800s. Today it hosts private homes along with a grass airstrip on the north end.

== See also ==
- Tidal Island
