= Eulonia, Georgia =

- Unincorporated community Census-designated place
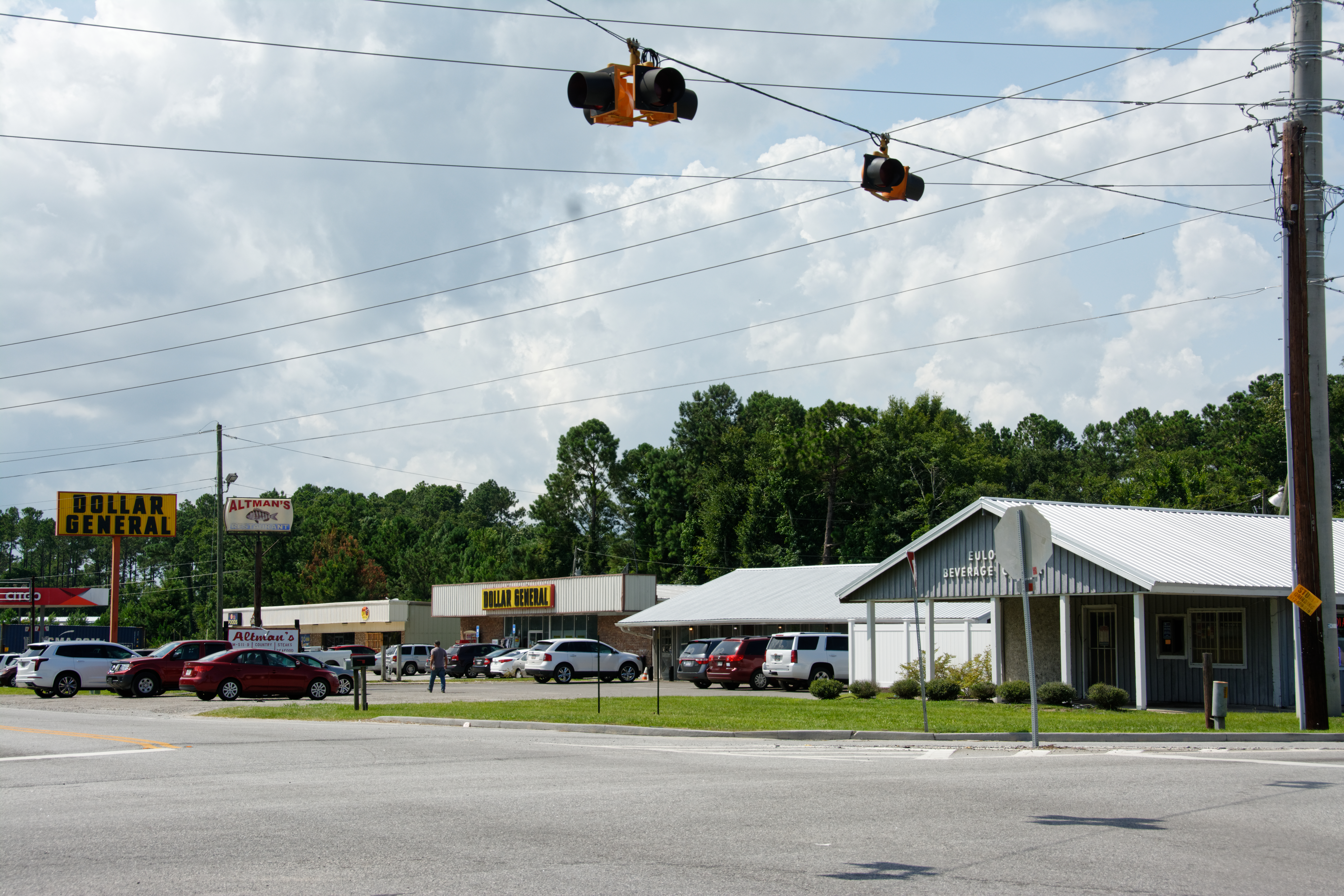
- The main intersection

- Location within Georgia Location within the United States
- Coordinates: 31°31′59″N 81°25′37″W
- Country: United States
- State: Georgia
- County: McIntosh

Area
  - Total: 3.28 sq mi (8.5 km^{2})
  - Land: 3.23 sq mi (8.4 km^{2})
  - Water: 0.05 sq mi (0.13 km^{2})
- Elevation: 16 ft (4.9 m)

Population (2020)
  - Total: 351
  - Density: 108.7/sq mi (42.0/km^{2})
- Time zone: UTC-5 (Eastern (EST))
  - Summer (DST): UTC-4 (EDT)
- ZIP code: 31331 (Townsend)
- FIPS code: 13-28016

Eulonia is an unincorporated community and census-designated place (CDP) in McIntosh County in the U.S. state of Georgia. Part of the Brunswick, Georgia Metropolitan Statistical Area, it is in the Low Country between Savannah and Brunswick near Interstate 95.

It was first listed as a CDP in the 2020 census with a population of 351.

== Geography ==
Eulonia is in central McIntosh, with the CDP centered around the intersection of U.S. Route 17 and Georgia State Route 99. The historic community of Eulonia is 0.6 miles (1.0 km) north of the crossroads. US 17 leads south 11 miles (18 km) to Darien, the county seat, and north 15 miles (24 km) to Riceboro. SR 99 leads east 4 miles (6 km) to Crescent and west 1 mile (1.6 km) to Interstate 95 at Exit 58. I-95, which forms the western edge of the Eulonia CDP, leads north 52 miles (84 km) to Savannah and south 28 miles (45 km) to Brunswick.

According to the U.S. Census Bureau, the Eulonia CDP has a total area of 3.3 square miles (8.5 km^{2}), of which 0.05 square miles (0.13 km^{2}), or 1.43%, are water. The tidal Sapelo River forms the northern edge of the CDP and runs out to the Atlantic Ocean 15 miles (24 km) to the east at Sapelo Sound.

== Demographics ==
Historical population
Census	Pop.	Note	%±
2020	351		—
U.S. Decennial Census; 2020

Eulonia was first listed as a census designated place in the 2020 U.S. census.

Eulonia CDP, Georgia – Racial and ethnic composition Note: the US Census treats Hispanic/Latino as an ethnic category. This table excludes Latinos from the racial categories and assigns them to a separate category. Hispanics/Latinos may be of any race.
Race / Ethnicity (NH = Non-Hispanic)	Pop 2020	% 2020
White alone (NH)	115	32.76%
Black or African American alone (NH)	218	62.11%
Native American or Alaska Native alone (NH)	0	0.00%
Asian alone (NH)	2	0.57%
Pacific Islander alone (NH)	0	0.00%
Some Other Race alone (NH)	1	0.28%
Mixed Race or Multi-Racial (NH)	3	0.85%
Hispanic or Latino (any race)	12	3.42%
Total	351	100.00%

In 2020, its population was 351.
