= McIntosh County Academy =

Public high school in Darien, Georgia, United States

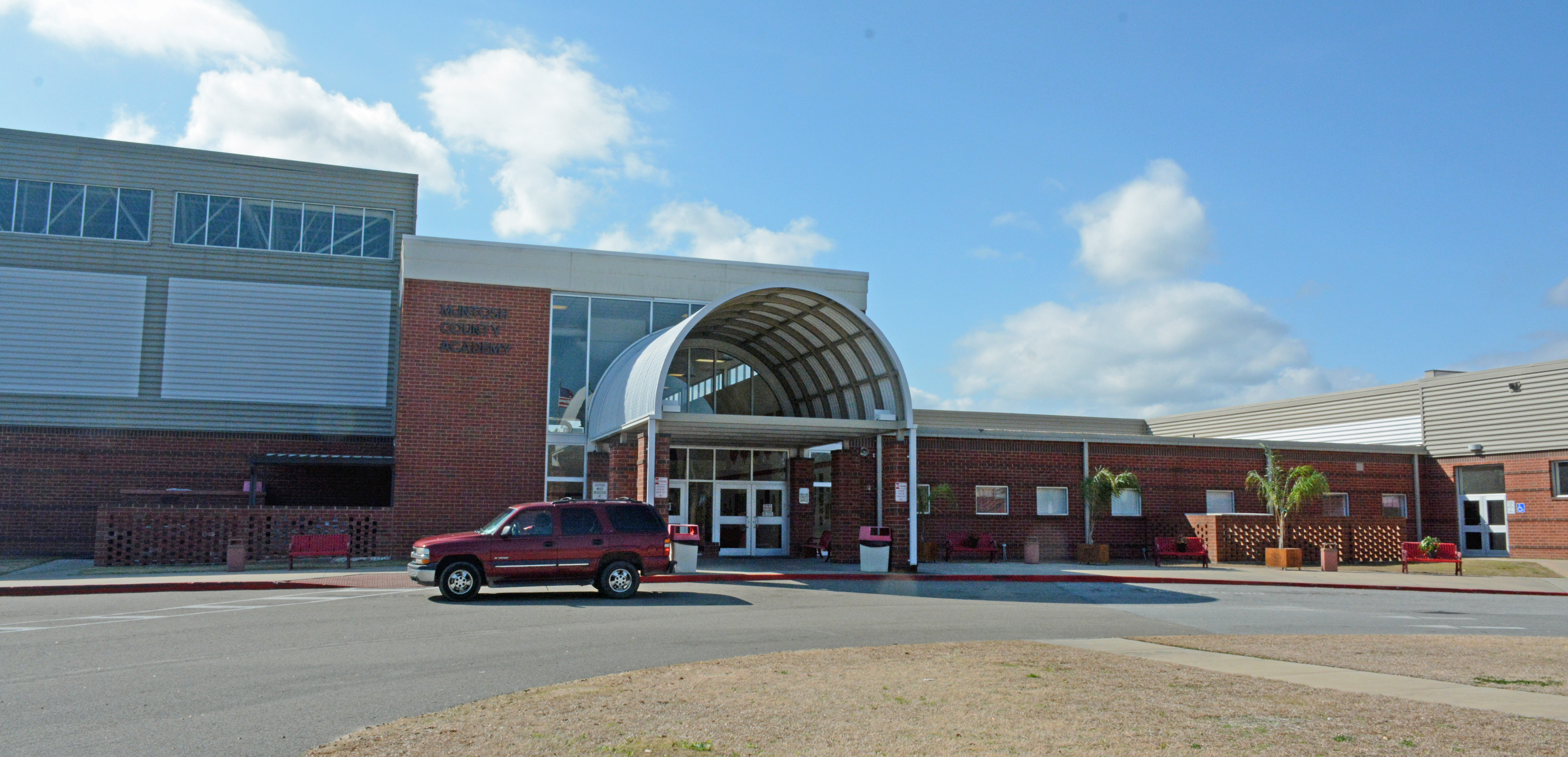
- McIntosh County Academy in 2015

Location
- 8945 US Highway 17; Darien, Georgia 31305; United States; 31°26′25″N 81°25′52″W

Information
- School type: Public, secondary
- Opened: 1875
- School district: McIntosh County School District
- NCES District ID: 1303600
- Superintendent: Melissa Williams
- NCES School ID: 130360002413
- Principal: Todd Willis
- Staff: 46
- Teaching staff: 26.80 (FTE)
- Grades: 9–12
- Gender: Coed
- Enrollment: 380 (2023–2024)
- Student to teacher ratio: 14.18
- Campus type: Rural distant
- Colors: Red, black, and gold
- Team name: Buccaneers
- Website: mca.mcintosh.k12.ga.us

McIntosh County Academy (MCA) is the only public high school in McIntosh County, Georgia, United States. It was formerly known as Darien High School.

== History ==
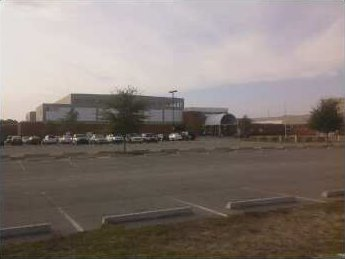
Side view

In 1794, the city of Darien was given a charter to build a school. In 1820, a branch of the institution was created and classes were held at local churches. The actual school building was built in 1840 on the corner of Adam Street and Rittenhouse Street.

On March 3, 1892, an intentional fire destroyed McIntosh County Academy. The city rebuilt a brick building on top of the remains of the old school in the same year. This was the site of the school for many years, until Darien constructed the new high school off U.S Highway 17.

MCA was built using the one cent ESPLOST (Education Special Local Option Sales Tax).

== Extra-curricular activities ==
- 4-H
- Beta Club
- Drama Club
- FBLA (Future Business Leaders of America)
- FCA (Fellowship of Christian Athletes)
- FCCLA (Family, Career, Community Leaders of America)
- FFA (Future Farmers of America)
- Guitar Club
- HOSA (Health Occupations Students of America)
- Independent Authors
- Interact Club
- JOOIC (Junior Optimist Octagon International)
- National Honor Society
- Science Club
- Skills USA-Vica
- Student Council
- YAC (Youth Advisory Council)
- Yearbook
- Gaming club

== Academics ==
In 2005, MCA began offering Advanced Placement classes in Calculus, English, US History, Environmental Science, and Art History. These classes are available to juniors and seniors.

MCA did not make AYP until 2007.

MCA was first place in the 2007 GHSA Region 2 GHSGT in English with a 93.7%. The graduation rate rose to third place among the GHSA boards, with 70.6% graduating.

== Notable alumni ==
- Allen Bailey (class of 2007) - NFL player
- Trevon Scott (class of 2016) - NBA player
