= Creighton Island =

Island in McIntosh County, Georgia, United States

- Location within Georgia
- Interactive map of Creighton Island

Geography
- Location: Atlantic Ocean
- Coordinates: 31°31′17″N 81°19′28″W

Administration
- United States
- State: Georgia
- County: McIntosh County

Creighton Island is a privately owned, barrier island in McIntosh County, Georgia. The island received its name from Alexander Creighton, a businessman from Savannah, Georgia, who owned the island in 1778.

== History ==
In 1756, Daniel Demetre had acquired the island that was then known as John Smith's Island. During the 1770s, William DeBrahm, a Surveyor General to King George III, noted the existence of entrenchments and ruins on the Island that could not be explained. The mysteries have lingered to this day.

The island in its earliest days of Colonial America was used for timbering and farming such as cotton, sugar cane and corn. In the 1800s Thomas Spaulding worked with William Cooke, who owned the island around 1838. They built Tabby buildings on the northern part of the island, which remains to this day. There were timber-loading facilities for large ships at what was known as "Sapelo port" on the north-end from 1880 to 1898, there was even a post office and telegraph lines that connected the island to Darien. When a hurricane hit in 1898 most of the facilities were destroyed, but were rebuilt by 1910, but at this time the timber boom era in McIntosh County came to an end. The current owners bought the island in 1947. There is even a small grass airstrip located on the southern part of the island for aircraft to land.
