= Wahoo Island =

Coordinates: 31.370800°N 81.218654°W

Wahoo Island is a tidal island located on the South Newport River in McIntosh County, Georgia.

== History ==
The area of the island had been known as the Wawhooo Islands by the local Native population. In 1760 John Barber petitioned General Oglethorpe, who was governor of the colony of Georgia, to grant hammocks on the south side of the South New port River, in what is now McIntosh County. He was requesting confirmation of his rights to the land. He had already settled there years earlier.

In August 2010 the United States Coast Guard rescued two men on the island after their airboat was disabled.

== Name origin ==
The name Wahoo is said to have come from Creek word ûhawhu, meaning cork or winged elm.
