= Valona, Georgia =

- Unincorporated community
- Location within Georgia
- Coordinates: 31°28′42″N 81°20′38″W
- Country: United States
- State: Georgia
- County: McIntosh
- Elevation: 10 ft (3.0 m)
- Time zone: UTC-5 (Eastern (EST))
  - Summer (DST): UTC-4 (EDT)
- ZIP code: 31319
- Area code: 912
- GNIS feature ID: 333316

Valona is an unincorporated community in McIntosh County, Georgia, United States. The community is located on the inland side of the Intracoastal Waterway 9.2 miles (14.8 km) north-northeast of Darien.

== History ==
A post office was established at Valona in 1898. The community was named after the Italian name for the city of Vlorë, in Albania.
