= Buckner F. Harris =

American soldier and politician

- Born: 1761; Brunswick County, Virginia
- Died: May 5, 1814; Ocala, Florida
- Occupations: Politician, Soldier, Military Officer
- Title: General
- Spouse: Nancy Matilda Harris (Early) (m. 1795–1814)
- Children: Robert Early Harris; Martha Letitia Dickson; General Wiley Pope Harris; Judge Buckner Harris II; Sophia Harris (Jones)
- Parent(s): Father: Capt. Walton Harris - 1738-1809; Mother: Rebecca Louise Harris (Lanier) - 1744-1818

Buckner F. Harris (1761 – May 5, 1814) was a soldier and politician from Georgia (U.S. state).

== Participation in the American Revolutionary War ==
During the American Revolutionary War Harris, a teenager with the rank of private, served with Georgia Governor John Clark. He fought in the impressive American victory during the Siege of Augusta.

== Land holdings in Georgia ==
Harris owned a sizeable amount of land within four counties in Georgia. Wilkes County: 1060 acres; Washington County: 1132.5 acres; Franklin County: 350 acres and Jackson County: 645.5 acres. He was engaged in the lumbering business in the St. Marys River (Florida-Georgia) area.

== Georgia–Florida border disputes ==
Harris was known to cross the international border from the U.S. state of Georgia into Spanish East Florida and illegally cut and harvest yellow pine and live oak timber. These actions infuriated the Spanish government, East Florida settlers and land owners which increased the tensions along the Georgia/Florida border and with the relationship between the two nations. These border tensions were one of the factors that led to the Patriot War.

== Participation in the Patriot War ==
Harris served in the Patriot War with the Georgia militia and held the rank of General. Early in the war he was an officer who had the respect of his troops and later emerged as the leader of the marauding 'Patriot' movement after the United States withdrew their troops from Spanish East Florida. Harris was appointed the office of director of the Republic of Florida and diligently worked to topple the Spanish government in East Florida. He led a force of 70 'Patriot' troops into the Indian country of the Alachua territory in East Florida, where the Seminoles were forced to abandon their towns earlier in the war, and ordered the construction of a 25 square foot blockhouse that he named Fort Mitchell. He then attempted to obtain U.S. government approval to annex the land from the Spanish government, but on April 19, 1814, Secretary of State James Monroe responded and made it clear that the 'Patriot' government was not going to be recognized or supported. In the meantime, East Florida Governor Sebastián Kindelán y O'Regan offered the Seminoles a bounty to kill the 'Patriots' that were occupying Spanish territory and General Buckner Harris was at the top of the list.

== Ambush at Waterman's Bluff ==
On August 8, 1813, the Spanish sent a large force of at least 60 soldiers in boats to attack the Patriot militia under Buckner F. Harris who was camped on a bluff. The Spanish boats were restricted to the narrow channel that wound through the tall marsh reeds, and were clearly visible for a quarter mile. But Buckner Harris was prepared for the Spanish attack and prepared an ambush. On the bluff, Buckner Harris and at least 30 Patriot militiamen concealed themselves behind trees and fence railings. When the Spanish attack force arrived, Buckner Harris and the American Patriot militia sprang their ambush and opened a heavy fire. The American militia ambush successfully routed the Spanish. Spanish casualties were reported: 6 killed and 12 wounded. Buckner F. Harris claimed in his report that his militia killed or wounded at least 20 of the Spanish.

== Death ==
On May 5, 1814, a Seminole war party ambushed Harris while he was exploring the Alachua area and abruptly killed and scalped him. Governor Sebastián Kindelán y O'Regan paid the Seminoles a reward after they turned in Harris's scalp along with some confiscated maps and surveys. The death of Harris, the 'Patriot' movement's charismatic leader, coupled with no support from the U.S. government marked the beginning of the end of the Republic of Florida and the Patriot War.
