= Tunis Campbell Jr. =

American politician

Tunis Gulic Campbell Jr. was a politician in Georgia. He was the son of Tunis Campbell Sr. (1812-1891). He and his father, along with other black legislators, were expelled. They were reinstated years later. He died in Boston. He was elected to represent McIntosh County, Georgia.

== See also ==
- African American officeholders from the end of the Civil War until before 1900
