= Black Island, Georgia =

Tidal island in Georgia, USA

Black Island
- Location within Georgia
- Interactive map of Black Island

Geography
- Location: Atlantic Ocean
- Coordinates: 31°22′15″N 81°24′05″W

Administration
- United States
- State: Georgia
- County: McIntosh County

Black Island is a tidal island located just east of Darien, Georgia. It currently has a private gated residential community that is surrounded by native woodlands and marshes.

== History ==
The island was once used as a lookout for Fort King George. Later it was used as a hunting preserve for R. J. Reynolds, Jr., who lived at a mansion on Sapelo Island.
