= Crescent, Georgia =

- Unincorporated community Census-designated place
- Location within Georgia Location within the United States
- Coordinates: 31°30′32″N 81°22′20″W
- Country: United States
- State: Georgia
- County: McIntosh

Area
  - Total: 4.77 sq mi (12.4 km^{2})
  - Land: 4.56 sq mi (11.8 km^{2})
  - Water: 0.21 sq mi (0.54 km^{2})
- Elevation: 30 ft (9.1 m)

Population (2020)
  - Total: 838
  - Density: 183.9/sq mi (71.0/km^{2})
- Time zone: UTC-5 (Eastern (EST))
  - Summer (DST): UTC-4 (EDT)
- ZIP codes: 31304 (P.O. box); 31331 (Townsend)
- FIPS code: 13-20372
- GNIS feature ID: 355371

Crescent (also Crescent Station) is an unincorporated community and census-designated place (CDP) in McIntosh County, Georgia, United States. It lies along State Route 99, 12 miles (19 km) north of the city of Darien, the county seat of McIntosh County. Its elevation is 30 feet (9.1 m) above sea level. It has a post office with the ZIP code 31304.

It was first listed as a CDP in the 2020 census with a population of 838.

== History ==
A post office called Crescent has been in operation since 1890. The community was named after the crescent shape of a nearby coastal inlet.

== Demographics ==
Historical population
Census	Pop.	Note	%±
2020	838		—
U.S. Decennial Census; 2020

Crescent CDP, Georgia – Racial and ethnic composition Note: the US Census treats Hispanic/Latino as an ethnic category. This table excludes Latinos from the racial categories and assigns them to a separate category. Hispanics/Latinos may be of any race.
Race / Ethnicity (NH = Non-Hispanic)	Pop 2020	% 2020
White alone (NH)	441	52.63%
Black or African American alone (NH)	346	41.29%
Native American or Alaska Native alone (NH)	3	0.36%
Asian alone (NH)	0	0.00%
Pacific Islander alone (NH)	0	0.00%
Some Other Race alone (NH)	2	0.24%
Mixed Race or Multi-Racial (NH)	28	3.34%
Hispanic or Latino (any race)	18	2.15%
Total	838	100.00%

In 2020, its population was 838.
