= McIntosh County, Georgia =

County in Georgia, United States

- County
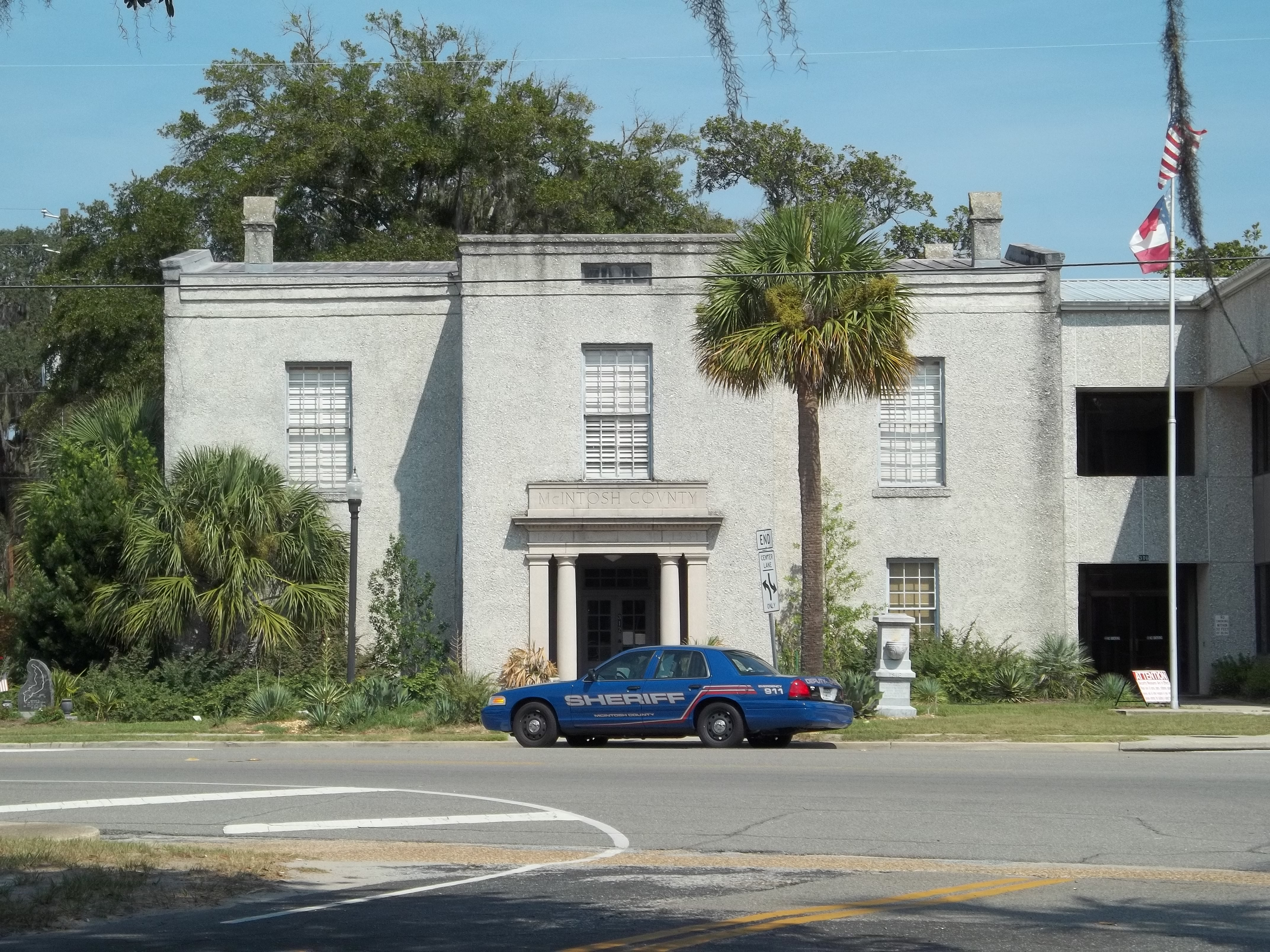
- McIntosh County Courthouse in Darien

- Seal

- Location within the U.S. state of Georgia
- Coordinates: 31°29′N 81°22′W
- Country: United States
- State: Georgia
- Founded: 1793; 233 years ago
- Named for: Lachlan McIntosh
- Seat: Darien
- Largest city: Darien

Area
  - Total: 574 sq mi (1,490 km^{2})
  - Land: 424 sq mi (1,100 km^{2})
  - Water: 150 sq mi (390 km^{2}) 26.1%

Population (2020)
  - Total: 10,975
  - Estimate (2025): 11,989 ▲
  - Density: 26/sq mi (10/km^{2})
- Time zone: UTC−5 (Eastern)
  - Summer (DST): UTC−4 (EDT)
- Congressional district: 1st
- Website: mcintoshcountyga.com

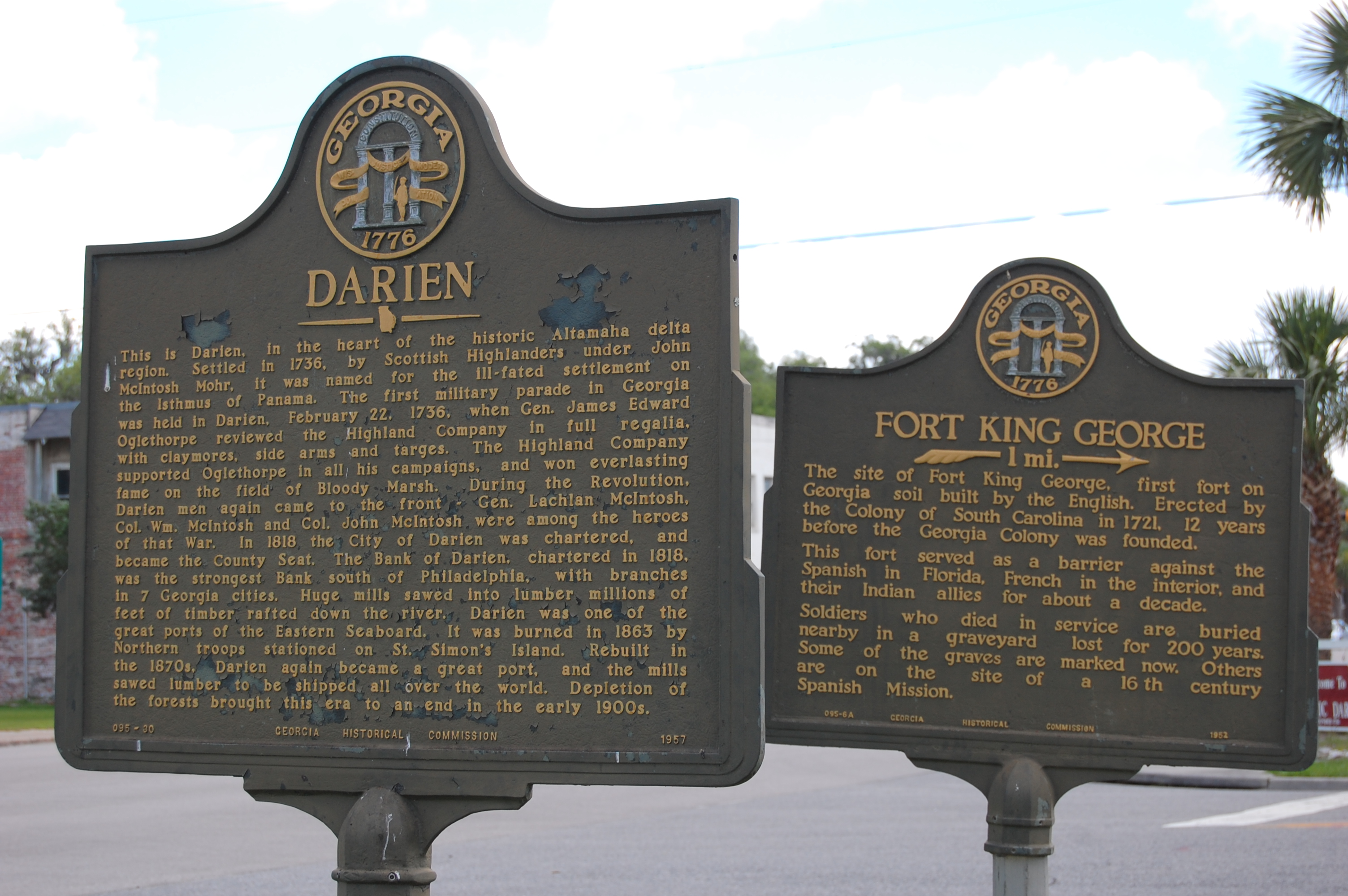
Two of the dozens of historical markers in the county.

McIntosh County is a county located in the U.S. state of Georgia. As of the 2020 census, the population was 10,975, a drop of 23.4 percent since the 2010 census. The county seat is Darien.

McIntosh County is included in the Brunswick, GA Metropolitan Statistical Area.

== History ==
=== Colonial and Revolutionary period ===
The area which was formally named McIntosh County was originally settled by the British in 1721 with the construction of Fort King George, which was part of a set of forts built as a buffer between the British colonies to the north and Spanish Florida to the south, under the direction of General James Oglethorpe. New Inverness (later named Darien) was founded in 1736 by Scottish Highlanders who were enticed to move to Georgia by General Oglethorpe. In 1760, the British built Fort Barrington on the north side of the Altamaha River about 12 miles (19 km) northwest of present-day Darien. It was used for decades as a transportation and communication center up and down coastal Georgia. The County split off from Liberty County in 1793.

The new county was named McIntosh for its most famous family, which included Lachlan McIntosh, who was a general in the Continental Army. The McIntosh clan in Darien dates back to 1736.

=== Civil War period ===
Few Georgia counties suffered during the Civil War as much as McIntosh County. The agricultural loss of the plantations was devastating. Even the lumber industry was destroyed, along with the once-thriving seaport town of Darien, Georgia which was the result of the burning of Darien in the "total war" tactics of James Montgomery in June 1863.

==== Capture of 26 old men ====
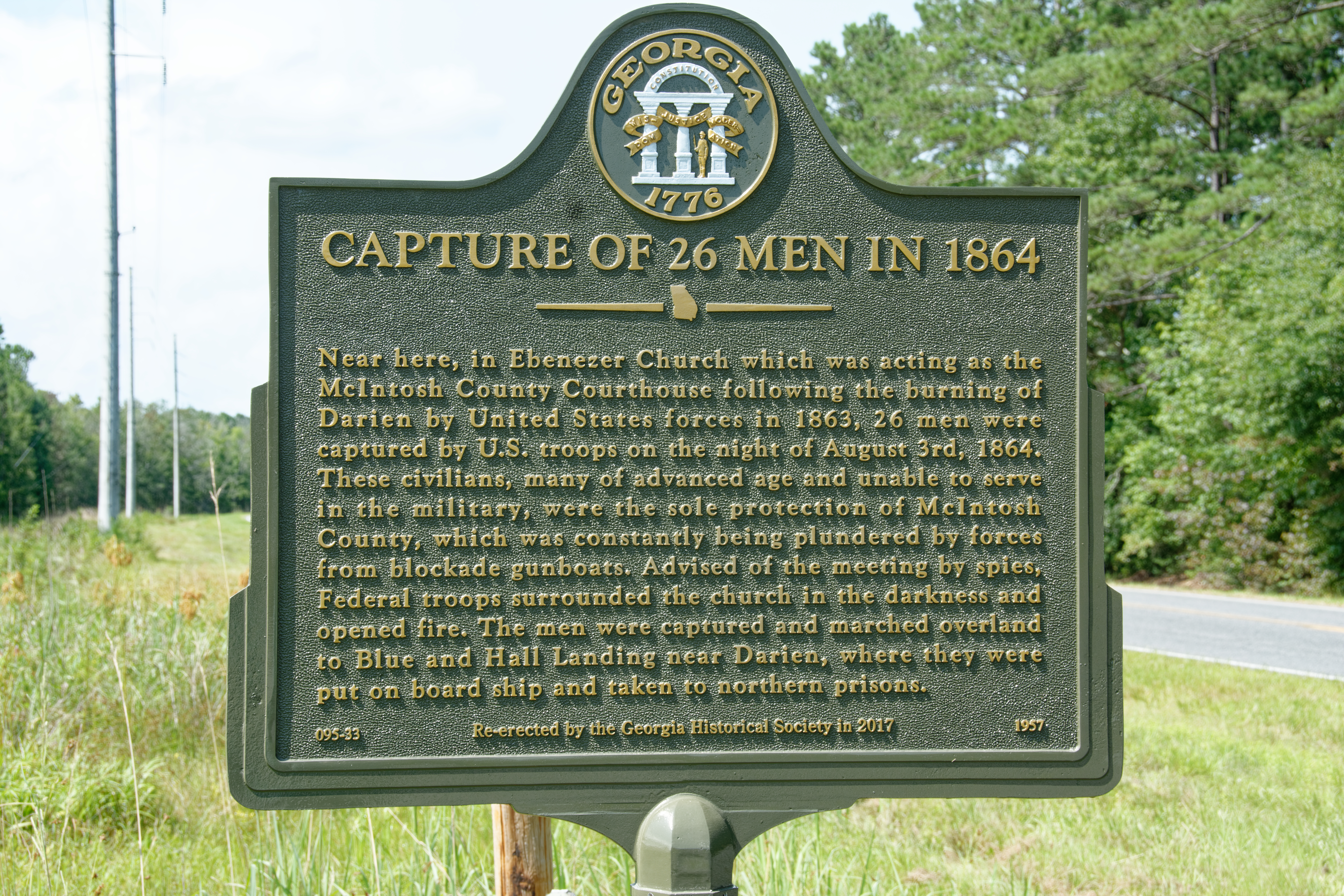
Sign about capture of 26 men

After the burning of Darien in 1863 under the command of U.S. Army Col. James Montgomery, the area was left mostly defenseless. A group of civilians, generally too old for military service, were the only defense against looting by the U.S. military from the naval blockade boats. The men were meeting at Ebenezer Church on the night of August 3, 1864. A spy told the U.S. military about the meeting. U.S. troops surrounded the church and opened fire. The 26 men were captured, marched to near Darien (about 10 miles away), put on ships and sent to prisons in the north.

=== Reconstruction ===
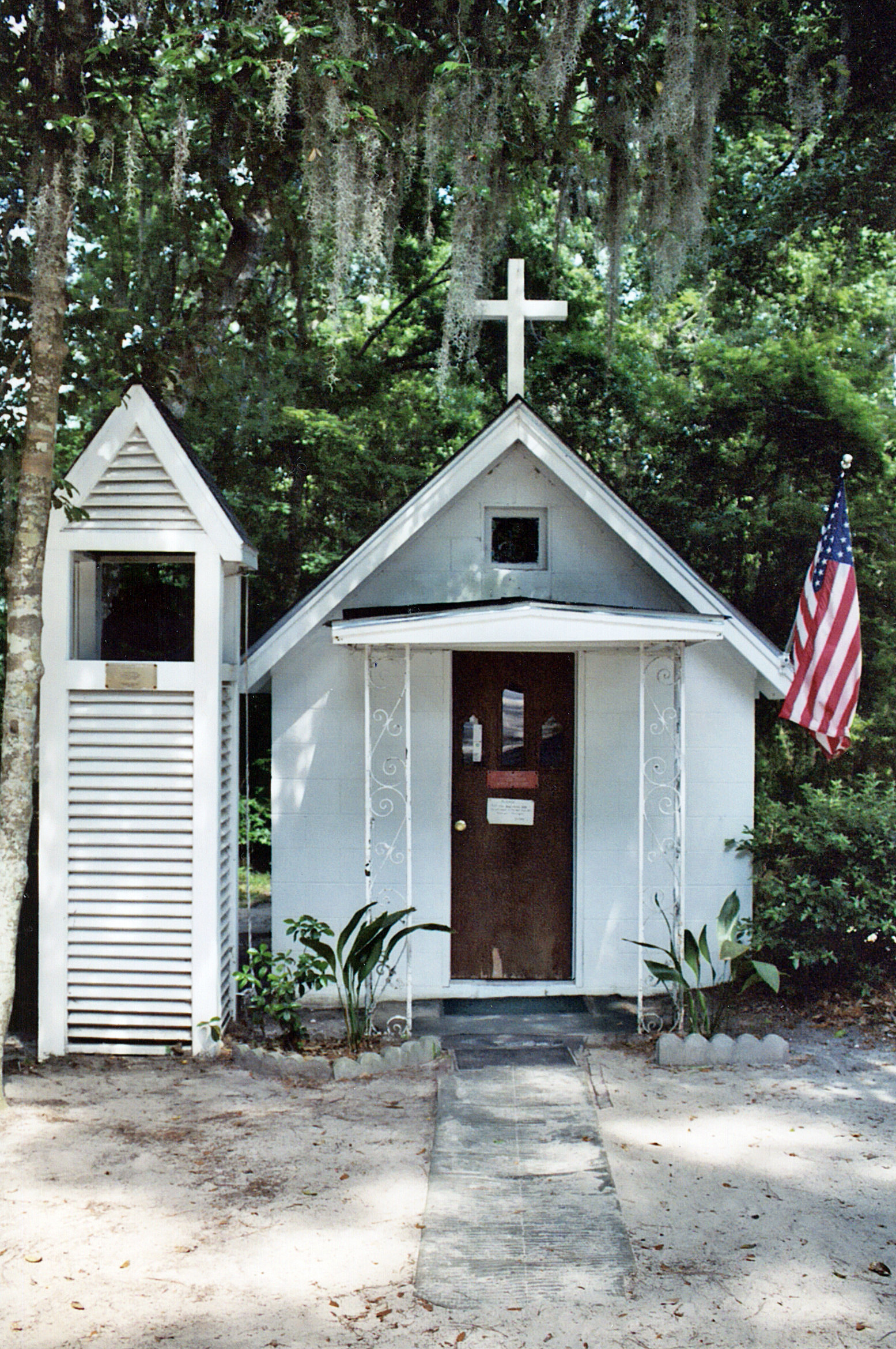
The Smallest Church in America

From the end of the Civil war to Georgia's 1907 disenfranchisement laws, McIntosh County was a base of black political power in the state. "Tunis Campbell was the highest-ranking and most influential African American politician in nineteenth-century Georgia", according to the New Georgia Encyclopedia. In March 1865, Tunis G. Campbell Sr. was put in supervision of land claims at the Freedmen's Bureau for a group of Georgia barrier islands, including Sapelo in McIntosh County. After the land in question was returned to plantation owners by President Andrew Johnson, “Campbell quickly purchased 1,250 acres at Belle Ville in McIntosh County and there established an association of black landowners to divide parcels and profit from the land.”

After the military registration carried out in early 1867, 600 black people and 307 white people were on the voter rolls in McIntosh.

In late 1867, Campbell was elected as one of two delegates from the second senatorial district – Liberty, McIntosh, and Tattnall counties – to Georgia's constitutional convention.

In April 1868, Campbell was elected as the state senator for the second district, and his son Tunis G. Campbell Jr. was elected as state representative for McIntosh County. While both Campbells were among the black legislators expelled later in 1868, they were able to return to office in 1871; Campbell Sr. left office in 1872, while Campbell Jr. served until 1874.

Campbell Sr. also served as the Vice President of the Georgia Republican Party. As an elected official, “Campbell [Sr.] organized a black power structure in McIntosh County that protected freed people from white abuses, whether against their bodies or in labor negotiations,” and he was rumored to be protected by a 300-person militia. In fact, that power structure lasted for decades, as evidenced by the fact that the county had three black representatives from 1875 to 1907: Amos R. Rodgers (1878–79), Lectured Crawford (1886–7, 1890–1, 1900–1), and William H. Rogers (1902–07).

=== Civil rights period ===
Despite its large number of black residents, McIntosh County politics continued to be dominated by whites well into the 1970s, even following the federal civil rights legislation of the previous decade. In September 1975, the Georgia Legal Services Program, on behalf of the local NAACP, filed suit in United States District Court, alleging that women and blacks were systematically excluded from grand juries responsible for appointing members to the McIntosh County Board of Education. The following May, plaintiffs and county officials reached an agreement providing for random jury selection.

In 1977, the NAACP filed separate suits against McIntosh County and the City of Darien, alleging improper districting for county and city commission seats. The county settled out of court, agreeing to redraw its commission boundaries to include a black-majority district. The NAACP lost its suit against the city, but this decision was remanded and reversed in 1979 by the United States Court of Appeals for the Fifth Circuit.

Praying for Sheetrock: A Work of Nonfiction (ISBN 0-201-55048-2) by Melissa Fay Greene narrates the events surrounding the civil rights movement in McIntosh County, particularly the death of Sheriff Thomas H. Poppell and the 1978 election of black rights activist Thurnell Alston as county commissioner.

== Geography ==
According to the U.S. Census Bureau, the county has a total area of 574 square miles (1,490 km^{2}), of which 424 square miles (1,100 km^{2}) is land and 150 square miles (390 km^{2}) (26.1%) is water.

The vast majority of McIntosh County is located in the Ogeechee Coastal sub-basin of the larger Ogeechee basin. The entire southwestern border of the county is located in the Altamaha River sub-basin of the basin by the same name.

=== Adjacent counties ===
- Liberty County (north)
- Glynn County (south)
- Wayne County (west)
- Long County (northwest)

=== National protected areas ===
- Blackbeard Island National Wildlife Refuge
- Harris Neck National Wildlife Refuge
- Wolf Island National Wildlife Refuge

=== Islands ===
- Sapelo Island
- Blackbeard Island
- Four Mile Island
- Creighton Island
- Wolf Island
- Black Island
- Hird Island
- Little Sapelo Island
- Wahoo Island

== Communities ==
=== City ===
- Darien (county seat)

=== Census-designated place ===
- Crescent
- Eulonia

=== Unincorporated communities ===
- Townsend
- Valona

== Demographics ==
Historical population
Census	Pop.	Note	%±
1800	2,660		—
1810	3,739		40.6%
1820	5,129		37.2%
1830	4,998		−2.6%
1840	5,360		7.2%
1850	6,027		12.4%
1860	5,546		−8.0%
1870	4,491		−19.0%
1880	6,241		39.0%
1890	6,470		3.7%
1900	6,537		1.0%
1910	6,442		−1.5%
1920	5,119		−20.5%
1930	5,763		12.6%
1940	5,292		−8.2%
1950	6,008		13.5%
1960	6,364		5.9%
1970	7,371		15.8%
1980	8,046		9.2%
1990	8,634		7.3%
2000	10,847		25.6%
2010	14,333		32.1%
2020	10,975		−23.4%
2025 (est.)	11,989	▲	9.2%
U.S. Decennial Census; 1790-1880 1890-1910; 1920-1930 1930-1940; 1940-1950 1960-1980; 1980-2000 2010

=== Racial and ethnic composition ===
McIntosh County, Georgia – Racial and ethnic composition Note: the US Census treats Hispanic/Latino as an ethnic category. This table excludes Latinos from the racial categories and assigns them to a separate category. Hispanics/Latinos may be of any race.
Race / Ethnicity (NH = Non-Hispanic)	Pop 1980	Pop 1990	Pop 2000	Pop 2010	Pop 2020	% 1980	% 1990	% 2000	% 2010	% 2020
White alone (NH)	4,379	4,852	6,607	8,716	7,060	54.42%	56.20%	60.91%	60.81%	64.33%
Black or African American alone (NH)	3,607	3,707	3,971	5,132	3,176	44.83%	42.93%	36.61%	35.81%	28.94%
Native American or Alaska Native alone (NH)	7	9	40	46	32	0.09%	0.10%	0.37%	0.32%	0.29%
Asian alone (NH)	12	3	32	45	43	0.15%	0.03%	0.30%	0.31%	0.39%
Native Hawaiian or Pacific Islander alone (NH)	x	x	3	5	0	x	x	0.03%	0.03%	0.00%
Other race alone (NH)	0	0	3	14	35	0.00%	0.00%	0.03%	0.10%	0.32%
Mixed race or Multiracial (NH)	x	x	92	148	398	x	x	0.85%	1.03%	3.63%
Hispanic or Latino (any race)	41	63	99	227	231	0.51%	0.73%	0.91%	1.58%	2.10%
Total	8,046	8,634	10,847	14,333	10,975	100.00%	100.00%	100.00%	100.00%	100.00%

=== 2020 census ===
As of the 2020 census, the county had a population of 10,975, 4,681 households, and 4,065 families. The median age was 50.2 years. 17.6% of residents were under the age of 18 and 25.4% of residents were 65 years of age or older. For every 100 females there were 93.2 males, and for every 100 females age 18 and over there were 91.0 males age 18 and over. 0.0% of residents lived in urban areas, while 100.0% lived in rural areas.

The racial makeup of the county was 65.1% White, 29.1% Black or African American, 0.3% American Indian and Alaska Native, 0.4% Asian, 0.0% Native Hawaiian and Pacific Islander, 0.6% from some other race, and 4.4% from two or more races. Hispanic or Latino residents of any race comprised 2.1% of the population.

Of the 4,681 households in the county, 24.1% had children under the age of 18 living with them and 29.6% had a female householder with no spouse or partner present. About 28.3% of all households were made up of individuals and 13.6% had someone living alone who was 65 years of age or older.

There were 6,615 housing units, of which 29.2% were vacant. Among occupied housing units, 77.2% were owner-occupied and 22.8% were renter-occupied. The homeowner vacancy rate was 2.2% and the rental vacancy rate was 14.2%.

== Transportation ==
=== Major highways ===
- I-95 / SR 405 (unsigned)
  - I-95 BL
- US 17 / SR 25
- SR 57 (The Wiregrass Trail)
- SR 99
- SR 131 (decommissioned)
- SR 251

=== Traffic signals ===
McIntosh County is noteworthy for being the only county in its area having no cycled traffic lights. There are two flashing lights in the county, however. One is at the four-way stop intersection of US-17 and GA-99 in Eulonia, and the other is at the intersection of US-17 and First Street in downtown Darien. There have been discussions in Darien of placing a traffic signal at the intersection of GA-251 and US-17, as well as at the Interstate 95 exit ramps on GA-251, as traffic flow has increased in Darien in recent years. However, no definite plans have been made in regards to potential future traffic signals.

=== Railroads ===
McIntosh County is also one of just a handful of counties in Georgia that no longer has an active railroad. The short-lived Georgia Coast and Piedmont Railroad once ran along present-day SR 99 and SR 57 but was removed by 1919. The more recent Seaboard Coast Line Railroad ran north to south along the western part of the county, through Townsend for most of the twentieth century. However, the track from Riceboro in Liberty County to Seals in Camden County was removed by CSX in the late 1980s, leaving McIntosh County without any railroad track. Evidence of the railroad corridor can still be seen in many areas, though.

== Politics ==
United States presidential election results for McIntosh County, Georgia
Year	Republican		Democratic		Third party(ies)	
Year	No.	%	No.	%	No.	%
1912	8	6.50%	113	91.87%	2	1.63%
1916	4	2.90%	114	82.61%	20	14.49%
1920	39	24.68%	119	75.32%	0	0.00%
1924	44	25.43%	127	73.41%	2	1.16%
1928	180	56.07%	141	43.93%	0	0.00%
1932	19	6.55%	271	93.45%	0	0.00%
1936	53	14.68%	308	85.32%	0	0.00%
1940	106	18.47%	468	81.53%	0	0.00%
1944	149	26.70%	406	72.76%	3	0.54%
1948	233	26.78%	425	48.85%	212	24.37%
1952	503	40.99%	724	59.01%	0	0.00%
1956	886	58.68%	624	41.32%	0	0.00%
1960	451	36.22%	794	63.78%	0	0.00%
1964	795	39.99%	1,193	60.01%	0	0.00%
1968	315	15.01%	943	44.93%	841	40.07%
1972	1,367	62.14%	833	37.86%	0	0.00%
1976	535	21.29%	1,978	78.71%	0	0.00%
1980	876	28.73%	2,104	69.01%	69	2.26%
1984	1,512	45.71%	1,796	54.29%	0	0.00%
1988	1,273	45.08%	1,527	54.07%	24	0.85%
1992	1,027	29.20%	1,925	54.73%	565	16.06%
1996	1,219	35.35%	1,927	55.89%	302	8.76%
2000	1,766	46.03%	2,047	53.35%	24	0.63%
2004	2,837	52.71%	2,523	46.88%	22	0.41%
2008	3,282	52.63%	2,905	46.58%	49	0.79%
2012	3,409	53.65%	2,864	45.07%	81	1.27%
2016	3,487	58.73%	2,303	38.79%	147	2.48%
2020	4,016	59.98%	2,612	39.01%	68	1.02%
2024	4,747	64.08%	2,628	35.48%	33	0.45%

United States Senate election results for McIntosh County, Georgia2
Year	Republican		Democratic		Third party(ies)	
Year	No.	%	No.	%	No.	%
2020	3,967	60.06%	2,498	37.82%	140	2.12%
2020	3,539	59.60%	2,399	40.40%	0	0.00%

United States Senate election results for McIntosh County, Georgia3
Year	Republican		Democratic		Third party(ies)	
Year	No.	%	No.	%	No.	%
2020	2,117	32.61%	1,545	23.80%	2,830	43.59%
2020	3,531	59.36%	2,417	40.64%	0	0.00%
2022	3,344	60.94%	2,048	37.32%	95	1.73%
2022	3,181	61.22%	2,015	38.78%	0	0.00%

Georgia Gubernatorial election results for McIntosh County
Year	Republican		Democratic		Third party(ies)	
Year	No.	%	No.	%	No.	%
2022	3,570	64.71%	1,923	34.86%	24	0.44%

As of the 2020s, McIntosh County is a Republican stronghold, voting 64% for Donald Trump in 2024. A Democratic stronghold in the 20th century, McIntosh County has now more recently leaned Republican, backing Donald Trump by the most it has ever supported a GOP presidential candidate.

For elections to the United States House of Representatives, McIntosh County is part of Georgia's 1st congressional district, currently represented by Buddy Carter. For elections to the Georgia State Senate, McIntosh County is part of District 3. For elections to the Georgia House of Representatives, McIntosh County is part of district 167.

== Education ==
The McIntosh County School District has three schools, including the McIntosh County Academy.

== Notable people ==
- Thomas Spalding (March 25, 1774 – January 5, 1851) United States Representative
- John McIntosh Kell (1823 - October 5, 1900) Executive Officer of the CSS Alabama
- Charles S. Thomas (December 6, 1849 – June 24, 1934) United States Senator for Colorado
- Arthur Conley (January 4, 1946 – November 17, 2003) soul singer
- Allen Bailey (March 25, 1989 – ) Defensive end for Kansas City Chiefs

== See also ==
- Fort King George
- Fort Barrington
- National Register of Historic Places listings in McIntosh County, Georgia
- List of counties in Georgia
