= Georgia State Route 307 =

Highway in Georgia, United States

State Route 307
- SR 307 highlighted in red

Route information
- Maintained by GDOT
- Length: 8.5 mi (13.7 km)

Major junctions
- South end: US 17 / SR 25 in Garden City
- I-16 in Garden City; US 80 / SR 26 in Garden City; SR 21 in Garden City
- North end: SR 25 north of Garden City

Location
- Country: United States
- State: Georgia
- Counties: Chatham

Highway system
- Georgia State Highway System; Interstate; US; State; Special
← SR 306	→ SR 308

State Route 307 (SR 307) is a south-north state highway located in the east central part of the U.S. state of Georgia. The route runs entirely within the Savannah metropolitan area and Chatham County.

== Route description ==
SR 307 begins at an intersection with US 17/SR 25 in Garden City. The route heads northwest along Dean Forest Road, before making a sharp turn to the northeast to its interchange with Interstate 16. It heads on a more northeastern direction before it curves to the northwest, and then to the north. Before skirting the southeastern part of the Savannah/Hilton Head International Airport, it intersects US 80/SR 26, and then curves to the northeast along Bourne Avenue. Heading due east, SR 307 intersects SR 21 (Augusta Road). Here, it begins a concurrency with SR 21 Alternate (SR 21 Alt.). The roadway curves to the southeast, where SR 21 Alt. splits off, and makes a northeasterly jaunt until it meets its northern terminus, an intersection with SR 25 (Ocean Highway) just north of Garden City.

== Major intersections ==
The entire route is in Chatham County.

Location	mi	km	Destinations	Notes
Garden City	0.0	0.0	US 17 / SR 25 (Ogeechee Road) – Richmond Hill, Savannah	Southern terminus
Garden City	2.4	3.9	I-16 (SR 404) to I-95 / I-516 – Macon, Savannah	I-16 exit 160
Garden City	4.2	6.8	US 80 / SR 26 (Louisville Road) to I-95 – Pooler, Savannah	
Garden City–Port Wentworth line	7.4	11.9	SR 21 Alt. begins / SR 21 (Augusta Road) to I-95 – Savannah, Port Wentworth	Southern end of SR 21 Alt. concurrency; southern terminus of SR 21 Alt.
			SR 21 Alt. north (Jimmy DeLoach Connector) to I-95 / SR 17	Northern end of SR 21 Alt. concurrency
Garden City	8.5	13.7	SR 25 (Ocean Highway) – Savannah, Port Wentworth	Northern terminus
1.000 mi = 1.609 km; 1.000 km = 0.621 mi
