= Georgia State Route 21 =

State highway in east-central Georgia

State Route 21
- SR 21 highlighted in red

Route information
- Maintained by GDOT
- Length: 84.39 mi (135.81 km)
- Existed: 1919–present

Major junctions
- South end: SR 204 in Savannah
- I-516 in Savannah; US 17 / US 80 / SR 25 / SR 26 in Savannah; I-16 / US 17 in Savannah; I-516 / US 80 / SR 25 / SR 26 on the Savannah–Garden City line; I-95 / SR 17 / SR 30 / SR 307 in Port Wentworth; US 301 / SR 73 in Sylvania
- North end: US 25 / SR 121 north of Millen

Location
- Country: United States
- State: Georgia
- Counties: Chatham, Effingham, Screven, Jenkins

Highway system
- Georgia State Highway System; Interstate; US; State; Special
← SR 20	→ SR 22

State Route 21 (SR 21) is an 84.39-mile-long (135.81 km) state highway that travels southeast-to-northwest through portions of Chatham, Effingham, Screven, and Jenkins counties in the eastern part of the U.S. state of Georgia. The highway connects the Savannah and Millen areas, via Garden City, Port Wentworth, Rincon, Springfield, and Sylvania.

SR 21 formerly continued to South Carolina from Augusta as South Carolina Highway 21 (SC 21). It traveled on the current path of US 25/SR 121 from Millen to Augusta. In the city, it used the path of SR 28 (Broad Street) and the Georgia segment of US 25 Bus. In South Carolina, SC 21 goes through major cities of North Augusta, Greenwood, and Greenville before meeting its northern terminus at the North Carolina state line at Caesars Head State Park, northwest of Cleveland. In 1928, SC 21 was decommissioned as it was replaced by US 25, as it got established and extended through South Carolina. SR 21 remains to be with US 25 in Georgia until 1981, when it was truncated to Millen.

The highway is part of the Savannah River Parkway which is being considered for inclusion into Interstate 3 (I-3), a future Interstate Highway proposed to connect the Savannah and Knoxville, Tennessee areas.

== Route description ==
SR 21 begins at an intersection with the eastern terminus of SR 204 (Abercorn Street) in Savannah. The highway travels to the west-northwest, becoming a freeway, and gains the designation of Interstate 516 (I-516) and the unsigned SR 421. The highways travel concurrently to the west-northwest, then curve to the north-northeast at the interchange with Veterans Parkway. At exit 3, US 17/SR 25 join the freeway from the southwest, and US 80/SR 26 join the freeway from the northeast. Continuing to the north-northeast, the highways have an interchange with I-16, at which point, US 17 departs to the east-southeast, concurrent with I-16. At exit 7, US 80/SR 26 depart to the west-northwest, and the highways turn to the west-northwest. After SR 25 departs, I-516/SR 421 ends, and SR 21 continues its northwestward route. In Port Wentworth, SR 30 joins the highway; north of their interchange with I-95, SR 30 departs to the west-southwest.

SR 21 continues north, leaving Chatham County and entering Effingham County. The highway travels through Rincon and Springfield, then continues northwest, through rural parts of the county, and continues into Screven County. After a brief concurrency with US 301/SR 73 Loop around the western side of Sylvania, SR 21 continues west into Jenkins County. East of Millen, SR 21 turns to the northwest at its intersection with SR 67, then arcs to the northeast of Millen to meet its northern terminus at US 25/SR 121.

=== Tom Triplett Parkway ===
The Tom Triplett Parkway is a section of SR 21 located in Port Wentworth on the west side of the Savannah metropolitan area.

It stretches from the Chatham–Effingham county line (roughly the Lake Cherie Road intersection) to the Garden City–Port Wentworth city line (roughly the SR 307 intersection).

In 2000, the Georgia General Assembly passed a resolution to designate this portion of SR 21 in honor of Tom Triplett, a Democrat who served as Mayor of Port Wentworth and as a State Representative for 18 years. Tom Triplett died in 2006, at 71 years of age.

=== National Highway System ===
The entire length of SR 21 is part of the National Highway System, a system of routes determined to be the most important for the nation's economy, mobility, and defense.

== History ==
=== 1920s and 1930s ===
SR 21 was established at least as early as 1919 on its current path from Savannah to Millen, and traveled north-northwest to end in Waynesboro. By the end of September 1921, it was extended north-northeast to Augusta, replacing a segment of SR 12. By October 1926, US 17/SR 25 was designated on the southern two-thirds of the Chatham County portion of SR 21, but there was no indication if SR 21 was truncated off this segment. In 1930, US 25 was designated on SR 21 from Millen to Augusta. About seven years later, SR 119 was designated on the path of SR 21 southeast of Springfield. At the end of the year, the 1938 GDOT map showed more detail for the highway; it was the first GDOT map that had inset maps for Savannah and Augusta. It showed that US 17/SR 21/SR 25 traveled west-northwest from Savannah on Bay Street. It also showed that US 25/SR 21 entered Augusta on Savannah Road, then began a concurrency with US 1/US 78/SR 4/SR 10/SR 12 (Milledgeville Road), traveled northeast on Twiggs Street, and curved to the north-northeast on 7th Street. At SR 28 (Broad Street), US 1/US 78/SR 4/SR 10/SR 12 traveled east-southeast on it, while US 25/SR 21 traveled west-northwest on it. They turned to the north-northeast on 13th Street to the South Carolina state line. Here, SR 21 continued as South Carolina Highway 21 (SC 21) when crossing the state line until 1928, as US 25 replaces SC 21 and continues through the state to the north.

=== 1940s and 1950s ===
Between the beginning of 1945 and November 1946, US 80/SR 26 was shifted onto a concurrency with US 17/SR 21/SR 25 from Savannah to southeast of Industrial City Gardens (Garden City's former name). US 17/SR 25 was shifted off of SR 21 farther to the south-southeast, in Industrial City Gardens. The entire length of SR 21 was hard surfaced. Between April 1949 and August 1950, the path of SR 119 southeast of Springfield was shifted northward, off of the concurrency with SR 21. Its former path that was not concurrent with SR 21 was redesignated as SR 275. By the beginning of 1952, SR 17 was extended on the path of US 17/US 80/SR 21/SR 25 in the Savannah area. Between June 1954 and June 1955, DeRenne Avenue in Savannah was established. A southern bypass of the main part of Augusta was built from US 78/US 278/SR 10/SR 12 on the northeastern edge of Camp Gordon to an interchange with US 25/SR 21 and the northern terminus of SR 56. It was under construction from there east, northeast, and north-northeast to the intersection of Gwinnett Street and 5th Street. US 1/US 78/SR 4/SR 10/SR 12 split off of US 25/SR 21 just north of Gwinnett Street. Between June 1955 and July 1957, US 1/US 25/US 78/SR 4/SR 10, with US 278's then-recent extension, was rerouted onto the previous bypass, which was completed on its previous path and extended a very short distance. SR 4 and SR 21 traveled on their previous alignments.

=== 1960s ===
Between July 1957 and June 1960, US 25 was rerouted in downtown Augusta. It traveled east-southeast on SR 28 (Broad Street) to the bypass of the city. Its former path was redesignated as US 25 Bus.; however, there was no indication if SR 21 ended at the 7th Street–Broad Street intersection, traveled concurrent with US 25 Bus./SR 28 (west-northwest on Broad Street), or traveled concurrent with US 25/SR 28 (east-southeast on Broad Street). By June 1963, SR 26 Loop was designated on DeRenne Avenue and proposed to travel west-northwest and then north-northeast to US 17/US 80/SR 17/SR 21/SR 26 just northwest of Savannah. The path of SR 121 was extended onto US 25/SR 21 from Millen to Augusta. By the beginning of 1966, SR 26 Loop was proposed to be extended from the La Roche Avenue intersection north-northeast to US 80/SR 26 west-northwest of Thunderbolt. Skidaway Road was established from US 80/SR 26 west-northwest of Thunderbolt south-southwest to DeRenne Avenue. SR 17 was truncated to what is now its northern intersection with US 80/SR 26/SR 30 northwest of Bloomingdale. A western bypass of Sylvania, designated as SR 73 Loop, was proposed from US 301/SR 73 south-southwest of the city to another intersection with those highways north-northwest of it. SR 121 was extended onto the bypass of downtown Augusta, which was then listed as Gordon Highway. SR 21 was indicated to travel on US 25 Bus./SR 28 (Broad Street) and split with it onto 13th Street. In 1966, SR 26 Loop was extended from Montgomery Street to Liberty Parkway and was under construction from there to Augusta Avenue. The next year, its segment from Liberty Parkway to I-16 was indicated to "open Spring '68". In 1968, this segment opened. The next year, SR 26 Loop was opened from I-16 to Augusta Avenue.

=== 1970s ===
In 1970, SR 26 Loop was proposed to be extended from Augusta Avenue north-northeast and west-northwest to US 17/US 80/SR 21/SR 25/SR 26. SR 73 Loop in the Sylvania area was completed, with US 301 designated on it. The former path of US 301 through the city, on SR 73, was redesignated as US 301 Bus. In 1977, SR 26 Loop was completed on its previous proposed extension. The next year, the entire completed portion of SR 26 Loop, except for the easternmost portion between La Roche Avenue and Skidaway Road, was redesignated as a southeastern extension of SR 21. The portion between La Roche Avenue and Skidaway Road was just decommissioned. SR 21 was also designated on Skidaway Road from US 80/SR 26 west-northwest of Thunderbolt south-southwest to DeRenne Avenue and continued its previous route.

=== 1980s ===
In 1981, the northern terminus of SR 21 was truncated to the main part of Millen. In 1985, the southern terminus of SR 21 was truncated to its current point at SR 204 (Abercorn Street). I-516 was designated on SR 21 from Montgomery Street in Savannah to Garden City. US 17/SR 25 was routed onto the path of I-516/SR 21 from the Ogeechee Road to the Bay Street interchanges. The former path on Bay Street was redesignated as part of US 17 Alt./SR 25 Alt. In 1988, an unnumbered road was built from SR 21 southeast of Sylvania to US 301/SR 73 at the southern terminus of SR 73 Loop south-southwest of the city. The next year, a northeastern bypass of Millen, designated as SR 828, was proposed from SR 21 east of the city to US 25/SR 121 north-northwest of it.

=== 1990s to present ===
In 1990, the unnumbered road south of Sylvania was designated as SR 829. In 1993, a western bypass of Springfield, designated as SR 863, was proposed from SR 21 south-southeast of the city to another intersection with SR 21 northwest of it. The path of SR 21 in the Sylvania area was shifted south-southwest, replacing the path of SR 829 and then routed on US 301/SR 73 Loop. Its former path was redesignated as SR 21 Bus. In 1995, the path of SR 21 in the Millen area was shifted northward, replacing the path of SR 828. The path of US 17 in Savannah, north of I-16, was shifted eastward, off of I-516/US 80/SR 21/SR 25/SR 26 and onto I-16 and SR 404 Spur. This rerouting replaced the path of US 17 Alt. In 1997, the path of SR 21 in the Springfield area was shifted westward, replacing the path of SR 863. In 2010, the path of SR 21 in the Newington area was shifted southwestward; its former path was redesignated as SR 21 Bus.

On May 2, 2018, a Lockheed WC-130H transport aircraft of the Puerto Rico Air National Guard crashed and impacted SR 21, near Port Wentworth. A section of SR 21 at the impact site was closed immediately after the incident, and the Air National Guard has provided funds for repairs and cleanup. As of May 2018, traffic is diverted around the crash site to an adjacent road through a temporary detour, until the Georgia Department of Transportation finishes repairs.

== Future ==
SR 21 forms part of the Savannah River Parkway between the Savannah area and Millen. Portions of the highway were considered for incorporation into the proposed I-3, a proposed Interstate corridor between Savannah and Knoxville. In 2005, Senator Saxby Chambliss and others introduced further legislation concerning the proposed Interstate. The rationale included economic development, highway connectivity, and linking military installations such as Fort Stewart and Fort Gordon with the Port of Savannah. However, in 2012, a federally authorized feasibility study of the corridor found substantial obstacles. Several alternatives encountered protected areas and difficult mountainous terrain, and remaining options carried estimates ranging from $700 million to $6 billion. Georgia and Tennessee transportation agencies showed little interest in pursuing it.

== Major intersections ==
County	Location	mi	km	Exit	Destinations	Notes
Chatham	Savannah	0.000	0.000		SR 204 west (Abercorn Street) – Hunter AAF	Southern terminus; eastern terminus of SR 204
Chatham	Savannah	0.713	1.147		I-516 begins (SR 421) / Mildred Street	Southern end of I-516/SR 421 concurrency; eastern terminus of I-516/SR 421; no access from southbound SR 21 to Mildred Street
Chatham	Savannah	2.477	3.986	2	Veterans Parkway south – Georgetown	Northern terminus of Veterans Parkway
Chatham	Savannah	3.361	5.409	3	US 17 south / US 80 east / SR 25 south / SR 26 east / Ogeechee Road – Brunswick, Downtown Savannah	Southern end of US 17, US 80/SR 26, and SR 25 concurrencies
Chatham	Savannah	4.260	6.856	4	Tremont Road	Southbound exit and northbound entrance only
Chatham	Savannah	4.628	7.448	5	I-16 (Jim Gillis Historic Savannah Parkway / SR 404) / US 17 north – Savannah, Macon	Northern end of US 17 concurrency; I-16 exit 164
Chatham	Savannah	5.231	8.418	6	Gwinnett Street – Amtrak Station	Northbound exit and southbound entrance only
Chatham	Savannah	5.912	9.514	7A	US 80 west / SR 25 Conn. north / SR 26 west (Augusta Avenue / West Bay Street) – Statesboro, Downtown Savannah	Northern end of US 80/SR 26 concurrency; southern terminus of SR 25 Conn.; signed as SR 25 Conn. and exit 7 southbound
Chatham	Savannah	6.141	9.883	7B	West Lathrop Avenue – Georgia Ports Authority, Ocean Terminal	Northbound exit only
Chatham	Garden City	7.135	11.483	8	SR 25 north (Burnsed Road / SR 26 Conn. south) to US 80 / SR 26	Northern end of SR 25 concurrency; northern terminus of SR 26 Conn.; signed as “To US 80” on southbound; signed as “SR 25” on northbound
Chatham	Garden City	7.394	11.899		I-516 ends (SR 421)	Northern end of I-516/SR 421 concurrency; western terminus of I-516/SR 421
Chatham	Garden City	7.802	12.556		SR 21 Spur east (Brampton Road)	Western terminus of SR 21 Spur
Chatham	Port Wentworth	9.685	15.586		SR 21 Alt. north / SR 307 (Bourne Avenue)	Southern terminus of SR 21 Alt.
Chatham	Port Wentworth	11.678	18.794		SR 30 east (Bonny Bridge Road) – Savannah National Wildlife Refuge	Southern end of SR 30 concurrency
Chatham	Port Wentworth	12.217	19.661		SR 21 Alt. south (Jimmy DeLoach Connector) to SR 17	Northern terminus of SR 21 Alt.; Sonny Dixon Interchange
Chatham	Port Wentworth	14.399	23.173		I-95 (SR 405) – Brunswick, Florence, Savannah/Hilton Head International Airport	I-95 exit 109
Chatham	Port Wentworth	14.938	24.040		SR 30 west (Piedmont Avenue) to SR 17 – Guyton	Northern end of SR 30 concurrency
Effingham		25.665	41.304		SR 275 north (Ebenezer Road) – Ebenezer, New Ebenezer Retreat Center	Southern terminus of SR 275
Effingham	Springfield	28.577	45.990		SR 21 Bus. north (South Laurel Street) – Springfield	Southern terminus of SR 21 Bus.
Effingham	Springfield	30.254	48.689		SR 119 (Madison Street) – Guyton, Springfield, Old Jail Museum	
Effingham		31.228	50.257		SR 21 Spur south – Springfield	Northern terminus of SR 21 Spur
Screven	Newington	48.323	77.768		SR 21 Bus. north (Savannah Highway) – Newington	Southern terminus of SR 21 Bus.
Screven	Newington	48.893	78.686		SR 24 (Oliver Highway) – Oliver, Waynesboro	
Screven	Newington	50.068	80.577		SR 21 Bus. south (Savannah Highway)	Northern terminus of SR 21 Bus.
Screven		61.856	99.548		SR 21 Bus. north (South Main Street) – Sylvania	Southern terminus of SR 21 Bus.
Screven		63.794	102.666		US 301 south / SR 73 south – Statesboro	Southern end of US 301 and SR 73 concurrencies
Screven		63.961	102.935		SR 73 north / SR 73 Loop begins – Sylvania	Northern end of SR 73 concurrency; southern end of SR 73 Loop concurrency; southern terminus of SR 73 Loop
Screven	Sylvania	65.882	106.027		US 301 north / SR 73 Loop north / SR 21 Bus. south – Allendale, Sylvania	Northern end of US 301 and SR 73 Loop concurrencies; northern terminus of SR 21 Bus.
Jenkins		81.357	130.931		SR 67 south – Millen	Northern terminus of SR 67
Jenkins	Millen	82.935	133.471		SR 23 (Sardis Road) – Millen, Sardis	
Jenkins	Millen	84.387	135.808		US 25 / SR 121 – Millen, Waynesboro, Magnolia Springs State Park	Northern terminus
1.000 mi = 1.609 km; 1.000 km = 0.621 mi: Concurrency terminus; Incomplete access

== Special routes ==
=== Garden City spur route ===
State Route 21 Spur
- Location: Garden City
- Length: 1.22 mi (1.96 km)
- Existed: 1960–present

State Route 21 Spur (SR 21 Spur) is a 1.22-mile-long (1.96 km) spur route that exists entirely within Chatham County. Part of the highway is in the city limits of Garden City. It is known as Brampton Road for its entire length.

It begins at an intersection with the SR 21 mainline (Augusta Road) in the northeastern part of Garden City, just northwest of the western terminus of Interstate 516 (I-516). It travels to the northeast and intersects SR 25 (Coastal Road), on the edge of the city limits. The highway continues to the northeast and reaches its eastern terminus, Georgia Ports Authority's Gate #2, and the entrance to GAF Materials Corporation, on the Savannah River.

The path of SR 21 Spur east of the intersection with SR 25 is included as part of the National Highway System, a system of roadways important to the nation's economy, defense, and mobility.

Between July 1957 and June 1960, SR 21 Spur was established on its current path.

The entire route is in Chatham County.

Location	mi	km	Destinations	Notes
Garden City	0.000	0.000	SR 21 (Augusta Road) – Savannah, Port Wentworth	Western terminus
Garden City	0.365	0.587	SR 25 (Coastal Road) – Savannah, Port Wentworth	Former US 17
	1.222	1.967	Georgia Ports Authority's Gate #2; entrance to GAF Materials Corporation	Eastern terminus at Port of Savannah
1.000 mi = 1.609 km; 1.000 km = 0.621 mi

=== Port Wentworth alternate route ===
State Route 21 Alternate
- Location: Port Wentworth
- Length: 3.42 mi (5.50 km)
- Existed: 2017–present

State Route 21 Alternate (SR 21 Alt.) is an alternate route of SR 21 that mostly exists in Port Wentworth. Most of its length is known as Jimmy DeLoach Connector. It begins on the northeastern edge of Garden City at an intersection with SR 21 (Augusta Road). It travels to the east, concurrent with SR 307 (Bourne Avenue). The highways curve to the southeast and then split. SR 21 Alt. travels to the north and enters the city limits of Port Wentworth. Immediately, it curves to the north-northwest. It has an interchange with Grange Road. Then, it crosses over, but does not have an interchange with, Crossgate Road. The highway then curves more to the north. After traveling on a bridge over some railroad tracks of Norfolk Southern Railway, it crosses over, but does not have an interchange with, SR 30 (Bonnybridge Road). After crossing over Saint Augustine Creek, it curves to the northwest and has an interchange with the southern terminus of SR 17 and the eastern terminus of Jimmy DeLoach Parkway. This interchange is the Sonny Dixon Interchange. Then, it heads to the west-southwest and reaches its northern terminus, an intersection with SR 21/SR 30 (Augusta Road). This intersection is actually also part of the Sonny Dixon Interchange.

Between the beginning of 2008 and the beginning of 2013, the roadway that would eventually become SR 21 Alt. was proposed as SR 1234 along roughly this same path. In 2016, this roadway was completed. In May 2017, Savannah and nearby Pooler requested that the Jimmy DeLoach Connector be included into the state highway system.

The entire route is in Chatham County.

Location	mi	km	Destinations	Notes
Garden City	0.000	0.000	SR 21 (Augusta Road) / SR 307 south (Bourne Avenue) to I-95 (SR 405) – Savannah, Port Wentworth	Southern terminus; southern end of SR 307 concurrency
	0.356	0.573	SR 307 north (Bourne Avenue) / Jimmy DeLoach Connector begins	Northern end of SR 307 concurrency; southern end of Jimmy DeLoach Connector concurrency; southern terminus of Jimmy DeLoach Connector
Port Wentworth	1.118	1.799	Grange Road	Interchange
Port Wentworth	3.134	5.044	SR 17 north (Jimmy DeLoach Parkway west) to I-95 (SR 405) Sonny Dixon Interchange to SR 21 (SR 30) / Jimmy DeLoach Connector ends	Northern end of Jimmy DeLoach Connector concurrency; northern terminus of Jimmy DeLoach Connector; southern terminus of SR 17
Port Wentworth	3.419	5.502	SR 21 (SR 30) to I-95 (SR 405)	Northern terminus
1.000 mi = 1.609 km; 1.000 km = 0.621 mi: Concurrency terminus

=== Chatham County spur route ===
State Route 21 Spur
- Location: Chatham County
- Existed: 1946–1960

State Route 21 Spur (SR 21 Spur) was a spur route of SR 21 that existed in the northern part of Chatham County. Between the beginning of 1945 and November 1946, it was established from SR 21/SR 30 north-northwest of Industrial City Gardens (the former name of Garden City) east to US 17/SR 25 north of the city. Between July 1957 and June 1960, it was decommissioned.

The entire route was in Chatham County.

Location	mi	km	Destinations	Notes
			SR 21 / SR 30	Western terminus
			US 17 / SR 25	Eastern terminus
1.000 mi = 1.609 km; 1.000 km = 0.621 mi

=== Springfield business loop ===
State Route 21 Business
- Location: Springfield
- Length: 2.09 mi (3.36 km)
- Existed: 2009–present

State Route 21 Business (SR 21 Bus.) is a business route of SR 21 that exists in Springfield. Between the beginning of 1997 and the beginning of 2010, it was established on SR 21's former path, also known as Laurel Street, from SR 21 in the southeastern part of the city to the southern terminus of SR 21 Spur.

The entire route is in Springfield, Effingham County.

mi	km	Destinations	Notes
0.000	0.000	SR 21 (Springfield Bypass) – Rincon, Newington	Southern terminus
1.514	2.437	SR 119 south (Madison Street) – Guyton	Southern end of SR 119 concurrency
2.090	3.364	SR 21 Spur north / SR 119 north – Sylvania, Estill	Northern terminus; northern end of SR 119 concurrency; southern terminus of SR 21 Spur; former SR 21 north
1.000 mi = 1.609 km; 1.000 km = 0.621 mi: Concurrency terminus

=== Springfield spur route ===
State Route 21 Spur
- Location: Springfield
- Length: 0.51 mi (820 m)
- Existed: 2009–present

State Route 21 Spur (SR 21 Spur) is a 0.51-mile-long (0.82 km) spur route of SR 21 that exists entirely within the central part of Effingham County. The southern terminus of the highway is in the city limits of Springfield. It is known as Old Tusculum Road for its entire length.

It begins at an intersection with SR 21 Bus./SR 119 (North Laurel Street). SR 21 Spur heads to the west-northwest. About 2,500 feet (760 m) later, it meets its northern terminus, an intersection with the SR 21 mainline.

The entire length of SR 1 is part of the National Highway System, a system of routes determined to be the most important for the nation's economy, mobility, and defense.

Between the beginning of 1997 and the beginning of 2010, it was established from the northern terminus of SR 21 Bus. on SR 119 to SR 21 north-northwest of the city, which is the current path of the highway.

The entire route is in Effingham County.

Location	mi	km	Destinations	Notes
Springfield	0.000	0.000	SR 21 Bus. south / SR 119 (North Laurel Street) to I-16 (SR 404) – Clyo, Garnett, S.C., Springfield, Effingham Hospital	Southern terminus; former SR 21 south
	0.512	0.824	SR 21 (Springfield Bypass) / Old Tusculum Road west – Rincon, Newington	Northern terminus
1.000 mi = 1.609 km; 1.000 km = 0.621 mi

=== Newington business loop ===
State Route 21 Business
- Location: Newington
- Length: 1.66 mi (2.67 km)
- Existed: 2010–present

State Route 21 Business (SR 21 Bus.) is a business route of SR 21 that is entirely within the southeastern part of Screven County. Most of the route is in the city limits of Newington. It is known as Savannah Highway for its entire length.

It begins at an intersection with the SR 21 mainline just southeast of Newington. It travels to the northeast and curves to the northwest to enter the town. It intersects SR 24. It has a brief section that is outside of the city limits before curving to the east and re-entering the city limits. Immediately after, it meets its northern terminus, another intersection with the SR 21 mainline.

SR 21 Bus. is not part of the National Highway System, a system of roadways important to the nation's economy, defense, and mobility.

At least as early as 1919, the SR 21 mainline was established on this path. In 1934, this path had a "completed hard surface". In 2010, the path of SR 21 was shifted southwestward. Its former path was redesignated as SR 21 Bus.

The entire route is in Screven County.

Location	mi	km	Destinations	Notes
	0.000	0.000	SR 21 – Springfield, Sylvania	Southern terminus
Newington	0.897	1.444	SR 24 (Oliver Highway/Newington Highway) – Statesboro, Waynesboro	
Newington	1.659	2.670	SR 21 – Springfield, Sylvania	Northern terminus
1.000 mi = 1.609 km; 1.000 km = 0.621 mi

=== Sylvania business loop ===
State Route 21 Business
- Location: Sylvania
- Length: 2.87 mi (4.62 km)
- Existed: 1993–present

State Route 21 Business (SR 21 Bus.) is a 2.87-mile-long (4.62 km) business route that exists entirely within the central part of Screven County. All but the southernmost 0.5 miles (0.80 km) of the route travels within the city limits of Sylvania. It is the former alignment of SR 21 through Sylvania.

It begins at an intersection with the SR 21 mainline, just southeast of Sylvania. It travels to the northwest and enters the city. Then, it curves to the north-northwest and intersects SR 73 (North Main Street). The two highways travel concurrently to the southwest. They intersect the southern terminus of Maple Street, which is the former SR 21 Conn. When they diverge, SR 21 travels to the northwest. The highway passes Screven County Hospital and Brantley Plaza Shopping Center. Approximately 0.9 miles (1.4 km) after the northern SR 73 intersection, it meets its northern terminus, an intersection with US 301/SR 21/SR 73 Loop.

SR 21 Bus. is not part of the National Highway System, a system of roadways important to the nation's economy, defense, and mobility.

At least as early as 1919, SR 21 was established on this path. In 1937, the path of SR 21 in the southern part of Sylvania had a "completed hard surface". Between the beginning of 1945 and November 1946, the path of the highway in the northern part of the city was hard surfaced. In 1988, an unnumbered road was built from SR 21 southeast of Sylvania to US 301/SR 73 at the southern terminus of SR 73 Loop south-southwest of the city. In 1990, this road south of Sylvania was designated as SR 829. In 1993, the path of SR 21 in the Sylvania area was shifted south-southwest, replacing the path of SR 829 and then routed on US 301/SR 73 Loop. Its former path was redesignated as SR 21 Bus.

The entire route is in Screven County.

Location	mi	km	Destinations	Notes
	0.000	0.000	SR 21 (Perimeter Road/Savannah Highway) – Springfield	Southern terminus
Sylvania	1.542	2.482	SR 73 north (North Main Street) – Allendale	Southern end of SR 73 concurrency; on one-way street around town square
Sylvania	1.646	2.649	Maple Street north	Former SR 21 Conn.
Sylvania	2.042	3.286	SR 73 south (West Ogeechee Street) – Statesboro	Northern end of SR 73 concurrency
Sylvania	2.868	4.616	US 301 / SR 21 / SR 73 Loop – Statesboro, Allendale SC, Millen, Screven County Industrial Park, Screven County Recreation Department	Northern terminus
1.000 mi = 1.609 km; 1.000 km = 0.621 mi: Concurrency terminus

=== Sylvania connector route ===
State Route 21 Connector
- Location: Sylvania
- Existed: 2009–2012

State Route 21 Connector (SR 21 Conn.) was a short connector route of SR 21 that existed entirely within the city limits of Sylvania. Between the beginning of 1995 and the beginning of 2010, it was established from SR 21/SR 73 (West Ogeechee Street) north-northwest on Maple Street and east-northeast on West W. T. Sharpe Drive to US 301 Bus./SR 73 (North Main Street). By the beginning of 2013, this highway was decommissioned.

The entire route was in Sylvania, Screven County.

mi	km	Destinations	Notes
		SR 21 / SR 73 (West Ogeechee Street)	Southern terminus
		US 301 Bus. / SR 73 (North Main Street)	Northern terminus
1.000 mi = 1.609 km; 1.000 km = 0.621 mi
