= Jimmy DeLoach Parkway =

Route information
- Length: 11.6 mi (18.7 km)

Major junctions
- West end: I-16 / SR 17 Conn. in Bloomingdale
- US 80 / SR 17 Conn. / SR 17 / SR 26 in Bloomingdale; I-95 in Savannah
- East end: SR 17 / SR 21 Alt. / SR 21 / SR 30 in Port Wentworth

Location
- Country: United States
- State: Georgia
- Counties: Chatham

Highway system
- Georgia State Highway System; Interstate; US; State; Special

Jimmy DeLoach Parkway is a 14.2-mile-long (22.9 km) parkway in the U.S. state of Georgia. It is located a few miles northwest of the main part of Savannah. It is a road that links Interstate 16 (I-16) in Bloomingdale with Georgia State Route 21 Alternate (SR 21 Alt.)/SR 21/SR 30 in Port Wentworth. It also has an interchange with I-95. It was named after Jimmy DeLoach, former mayor of Garden City and Chatham County commissioner for District 7.

In 2016, an extension and renovation project of the parkway was proposed, and construction started in 2016 and finished in late 2022. The construction has extended the parkway into Bloomingdale Road and I-16, and the at-grade intersection with US 80 has been converted into a full diamond interchange.

== Route description ==
The parkway starts after Little Neck Road at the exit 152 roundabout interchange on I-16 in the western part of Bloomingdale where SR 17 Conn. begins. It then intersects US 80 / SR 26 / SR 17 with a diamond interchange where SR 17 Conn. ends and SR 17 joins the highway. The parkway then heads to the northeast, and then curves to the north-northeast. It makes a gradual curve to the east-northeast. Just west of Towler Road, it begins a curve to the northeast and then leaves Bloomingdale and enters the northern part of Pooler. After curving back to the east-northeast, the parkway leaves Pooler just east of an intersection with the southern terminus of Triple B Trail and enters the far northwestern part of Savannah. It curves to the northeast and then to the southeast just before an interchange with exit 106 on Interstate 95 (I-95). The parkway then begins a curve back to the east-northeast just before an intersection with Crossroads Parkway. It travels on a bridge over some railroad tracks of Norfolk Southern Railway and then on another bridge over some railroad tracks of CSX. Just east of an intersection with the northern terminus of Portside Court and the southern terminus of Logistics Way, the parkway curves to the southeast. A short distance later, it curves back to the east-northeast. On the Savannah–Port Wentworth line, it travels on a bridge over some railroad tracks of CSX and SR 21/SR 30. The parkway then enters Port Wentworth proper and has an interchange with SR 21 Alt. (Sonny Dixon Interchange / Jimmy DeLoach Connector). Here, SR 17 and the parkway's mainline ends, and the roadway continues as the connector.

== History ==
Between the beginning of 1986 and the beginning of 1990, the roadway that would eventually become part of the parkway was established as Godley Road between US 80/SR 26 in the northern part of Bloomingdale to SR 21/SR 30 in the central part of Port Wentworth. By the beginning of 1993, a revamping of this road was proposed from SR 17 in the southwestern part of Bloomingdale to SR 21/SR 30 just north of its eastern terminus. However, by the beginning of 1997, this plan was canceled. In 2017, it was planned to extended Jimmy DeLoach Parkway from its current southern terminus at US 80/SR 17/SR 26, partially along the path of Bloomingdale Road (from SR 17's current southern terminus at I-16 to just south of its intersection with the northern terminus of Pine Barren Road). Construction on the extension began in 2018 and finished in late 2022.

=== Namesake ===
James "Jimmy" DeLoach was a Democrat. He served three terms as Mayor of Garden City from 1973 to 1979. In 1980, he was elected to a four-year term as Chatham County commissioner for District 7. He was re-elected in 1984 and 1988. He did not run for re-election in 1992. His son Eddie, who is a Republican, succeeded him; and went on to become the 66th Mayor of Savannah.

== Major intersections ==
The entire route is in Chatham County.

Location	mi	km	Destinations	Notes
Bloomingdale	0.0	0.0	I-16 (Jim Gillis Historic Savannah Parkway / SR 404) / SR 17 Conn. begins / Little Neck Road south – Macon, Savannah	Western terminus; southern terminus of SR 17 Conn.; northern terminus of Little Neck Road; western end of SR 17 Conn. concurrency; I-16 exit 152; roundabout interchange
Bloomingdale	2.8	4.5	US 80 / SR 17 north / SR 17 Conn. ends / SR 26 – Bloomingdale	Northern terminus of SR 17 Conn.; eastern end of SR 17 Conn. concurrency; western end of SR 17 concurrency; interchange
Savannah	9.1– 9.3	14.6– 15.0	I-95 (SR 405) – Savannah, Florence	I-95 exit 106
Port Wentworth	11.3– 11.6	18.2– 18.7	SR 17 ends / SR 21 Alt. / Jimmy DeLoach Connector south to SR 21 (SR 30)	Southern terminus of SR 17; eastern end of SR 17 concurrency; eastern terminus of Jimmy DeLoach Parkway; northern terminus of Jimmy DeLoach Connector; Sonny Dixon Interchange
1.000 mi = 1.609 km; 1.000 km = 0.621 mi: Concurrency terminus
