= Rincon, Georgia =

Rincon
- City
- Flag Seal
- Motto: "Just around the corner from everywhere you want to be"
- Location in Effingham County and the state of Georgia
- Coordinates: 32°17′36″N 81°14′3″W
- Country: United States
- State: Georgia
- County: Effingham

Government
  - Mayor: Ken Lee
  - City Manager: Jonathan Lynn

Area
  - Total: 9.75 sq mi (25.24 km^{2})
  - Land: 9.75 sq mi (25.24 km^{2})
  - Water: 0 sq mi (0.00 km^{2})
- Elevation: 72 ft (22 m)

Population (2020)
  - Total: 10,934
  - Density: 1,121.9/sq mi (433.17/km^{2})
- Time zone: UTC-5 (EST)
  - Summer (DST): UTC-4 (EDT)
- ZIP code: 31326
- Area code: 912
- FIPS code: 13-65296
- GNIS feature ID: 0332857
- Website: www.cityofrincon.com

Rincon is a city in Effingham County, Georgia, United States. The 2020 population was 10,934, up from 8,836 at the 2010 census. Rincon is part of the Savannah metropolitan statistical area.

== History ==
Rincon, in the southeast area of Effingham County, Georgia, was incorporated as a city in 1927. While the earliest settlers came to the area in 1751, the area had little development until the late 19th century.

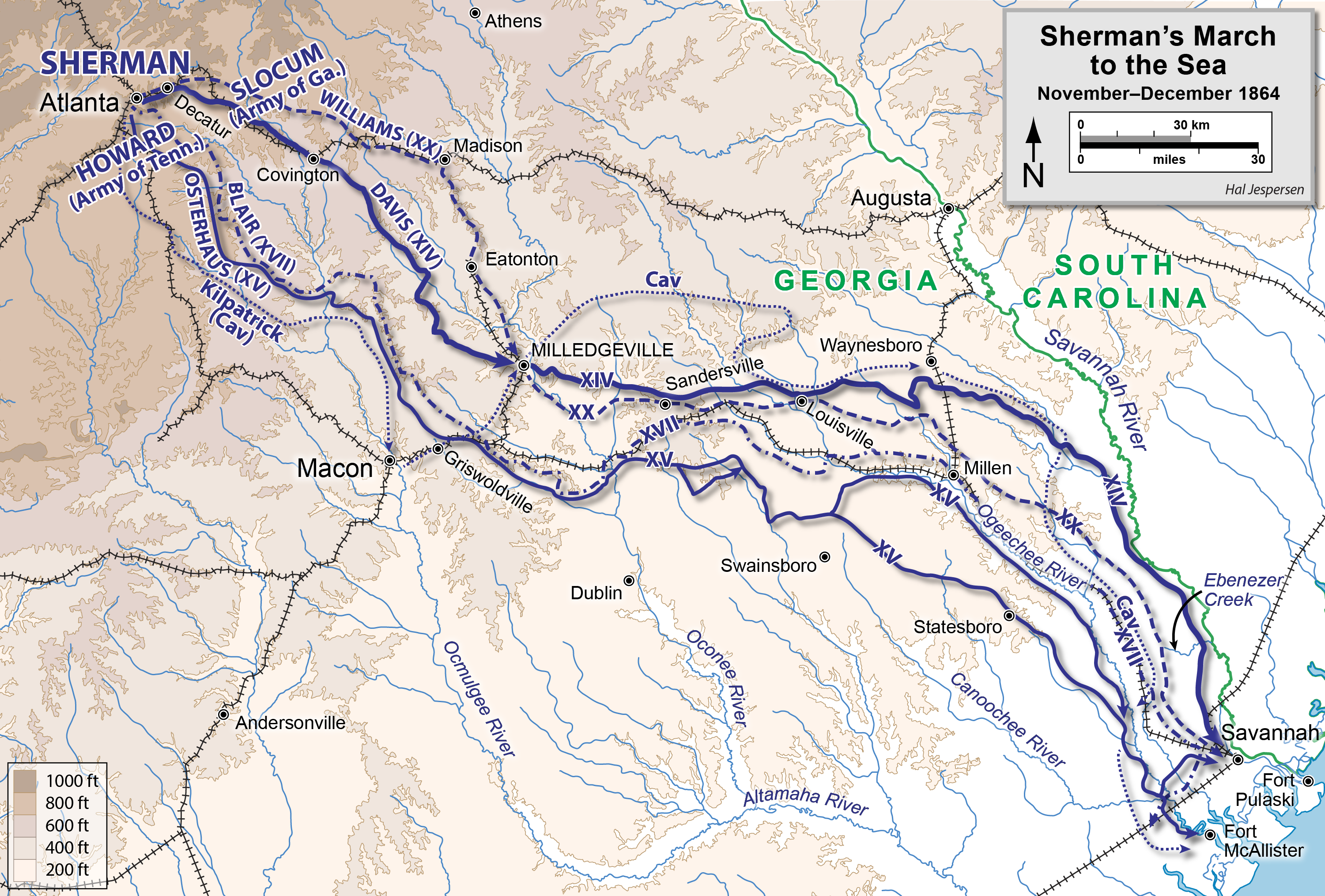
Savannah Campaign (Sherman's March to the Sea).

During the American Civil War, when forces of the Union Army penetrated the South, thousands of slaves escaped from plantations to go to their lines. Many fell in with the forces of Union General William Tecumseh Sherman and followed his March to the Sea. Hundreds of fugitive African-Americans drowned during the campaign while trying to cross Ebenezer Creek near the site of present-day Rincon, outside of Savannah. In 2010 the Georgia Historical Society erected a historical marker about this event, as part of a major project to memorialize little-known events from the Civil War era and recognize African-American sacrifices for freedom.

Rincon's development was catalyzed by the coming of the railroad in the 1890s. A rail line was built from the Carolinas across the state line at the Savannah River and southward to Savannah. The name of the city is believed to have been adopted from the Spanish or Mexican name Rincón, after a small but prosperous town in Mexico. (Rincón means "corner", more specifically an inside corner as one might refer to a nook, cove, or a more isolated location.) Rincon is pronounced /ˈrɪŋkɪn/ (“RINK-in”) by locals, differing from the Spanish pronunciation /riŋˈkon/.

Once the railroad and depot were built at Rincon, a telegraph operator or agent was on duty as early as about 1895. This opened up the area to long-distance communication. In addition to the railroad, a "dirt" road (now improved as State Highway 21) was built northwest from Savannah to Rincon and beyond, and other country roads were developed in the area. Rincon became a small hive of trading activity. The surrounding farmers, sawmill operators and the like, who had taken their products of cotton and lumber to Savannah, could "wagon" to Rincon to ship by rail. They also could receive shipments there and travel as rail passengers.

About the time of World War I, there was a spurt of local activity. Some men served in the military, and many locals in and around Rincon commuted daily to work in shipbuilding and other war-related plants in Port Wentworth and Savannah. Soon after the war, new homes were built or completed by new residents and old.

Residents established a grade school for white students about 1900 in an old two-story building opposite the Lutheran church. A few years later the school was relocated into a new two-story building between 4th and 5th streets. It had a steeple belltower and bell to signal recess and lunch periods, and the daily opening and closing of school. That building was used for at least 40 years for both grade school and high school. First known as the Effingham Institute. Its name was changed in the early 1920s to Rincon High School. Racial segregation continued to exclude African Americans from this school.

By 1929 the corporate government of the small town had become inactive, in part due to the small population. Sometime later, however, the population began to increase. By 1950 the population was 454. By 1955 it was 650 and by 1960 it was 1,057. Rincon was reincorporated and organized as the Town of Rincon around the end of 1954. The incorporated limits of Rincon originally formed a circle having a diameter of 2.5 miles (4.0 km), with the center at the site of the old (now gone) railroad depot, but annexations of land since the late 20th century have changed this shape.

In approximately 1934, Georgia State Route 21 was paved from the Chatham County line in the south, northward through Rincon and Springfield and beyond. In about 1939, electric lines were installed, and electric power was supplied from the Savannah Electric and Power Company, replacing private individual small plants. These improvements were made during the Great Depression to provide jobs to working men, with assistance from the federal government under the WPA program of President Franklin D. Roosevelt, whose administration invested heavily in infrastructure in the South.

In late 1955, Rincon installed its own city pump, tank, lines and water system, enabling "running water" throughout for the first time. In 1956, a volunteer fire department was organized. Also beginning in that year, many arterials and streets were paved.

As suburban development has expanded outward from Savannah, since 1990 the population of Rincon has grown rapidly, rising from 2,697 in 1990 to an estimated 9,638 in 2014.

== Geography ==
Rincon is located in southeastern Effingham County at 32°17′36″N 81°14′3″W (32.293258, -81.234171). Georgia State Route 21 passes through the town, leading northwest 7 miles (11 km) to Springfield, the county seat, and south 18 miles (29 km) to Savannah.

According to the United States Census Bureau, the city has a total area of 8.9 square miles (23.0 km^{2}), all land.

== Demographics ==
Historical population
Census	Pop.	Note	%±
1930	317		—
1940	285		−10.1%
1950	424		48.8%
1960	1,057		149.3%
1970	1,854		75.4%
1980	1,988		7.2%
1990	2,697		35.7%
2000	4,376		62.3%
2010	8,836		101.9%
2020	10,934		23.7%
2025 (est.)	11,726	▲	7.2%
U.S. Decennial Census; 2025

=== 2020 census ===
As of the 2020 census, Rincon had a population of 10,934. The median age was 34.4 years. 28.6% of residents were under age 18 and 10.7% were age 65 or older. For every 100 females, there were 91.3 males; for every 100 females age 18 and over, there were 86.3 males.

98.7% of residents lived in urban areas, while 1.3% lived in rural areas.

There were 4,109 households in Rincon, including 2,537 families. Of all households, 41.7% had children under the age of 18 living in them. 45.9% were married-couple households, 16.4% were households with a male householder and no spouse or partner present, and 30.8% were households with a female householder and no spouse or partner present. About 24.1% of all households were made up of individuals, and 9.2% had someone living alone who was 65 years of age or older.

There were 4,347 housing units, of which 5.5% were vacant. The homeowner vacancy rate was 1.5% and the rental vacancy rate was 5.3%.

Rincon racial composition as of 2020
Race	Num.	Perc.
White (non-Hispanic)	6,663	60.94%
Black or African American (non-Hispanic)	2,512	22.97%
Native American	28	0.26%
Asian	254	2.32%
Pacific Islander	10	0.09%
Other/Mixed	650	5.94%
Hispanic or Latino	817	7.47%

== Notable people ==
- Billy Currington, country music artist; raised in Rincon
- Bill Hitchens - Politician. Resident in Rincon.
- Sydney Martinez - Professional footballer. Born in Rincon.
- Tracy Yardley, comic book artist. Resident in Rincon.
