= Sandfly, Georgia =

Sandfly
- Unincorporated community
- Map showing the location of Sandfly, Georgia
- Coordinates: 31°59′23″N 81°04′34″W
- Country: United States
- State: Georgia
- County: Chatham County
- Elevation: 16 ft (4.9 m)
- GNIS feature ID: 332970

Sandfly is an unincorporated community in Chatham County, Georgia, United States. It is also known as Sand Fly.

Established by African Americans in the nineteenth century, Sandfly is centered around the intersection of Montgomery Crossroad and Skidaway road. Many families in this community trace their ancestry to former slaves from nearby Wormsloe Plantation who bought land as free persons and established homes and churches. After 1870 Central Avenue became the main route for the Industrial Streetcar System, making Sandfly a crossroads between the city of Savannah and Wormsloe Plantation, Bethesda Home for Boys, and Isle of Hope. Sandfly continues to thrive as a historic African-American community.
