= Jared Wade =

American country music singer-songwriter (born 1989)

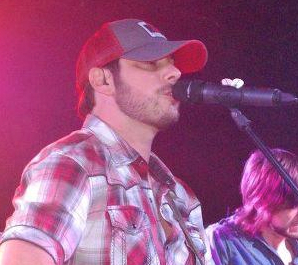
- Jared Wade performing live in Nashville, TN

Background information
- Born: August 27, 1981; Savannah, Georgia
- Origin: Pooler, Georgia
- Genres: Country
- Occupation: Singer-songwriter
- Instruments: Vocals, guitar
- Years active: 2007–present
- Label: Lawrence Music Group
- Website: www.jaredwademusic.com

Jared Wade (born August 27, 1988 in Savannah, Georgia) is an American country music singer-songwriter. Wade was raised in Pooler, outside Savannah, and attended Georgia Southern University with classmate Luke Bryan. He received a Bachelor of Science in Manufacturing and held a management position at United Parcel Service until he learned to play guitar for the first time in 2006.

Jared landed the opening act slot for the Luke Bryan 'Farm Tour', both in 2010 and 2011, which opened opportunities for more shows with artists such as Wade Bowen, Confederate Railroad, Joe Diffie, Trent Tomlinson, John Anderson, Craig Campbell and Blackhawk.

On February 2, 2013 Wade released his debut EP Drunk On Sunshine which led to him to winning the Georgia Music Awards 2013 Country Male Vocalist of the Year.

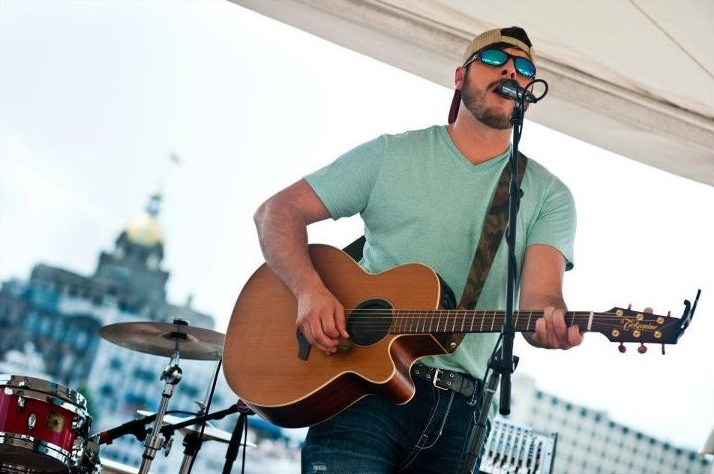
Jared Wade, performing at the Savannah Craft Brew Fest, 2011

In April 2014 Wade landed on the cover of Pooler Magazine and was again nominated for both Georgia Music Awards 2014 Male Vocalist of the Year and 2014 Country Male Vocalist of the Year.

== Discography ==
=== Albums ===
Title	Album details
Drunk on Sunshine	Release date: February 2, 2013; Label: Lawrence Music Group
