= Interstate 516 =

Auxiliary Interstate Highway in Chatham County, Georgia, United States

Interstate 516
- W.F. Lynes Parkway
- I-516 highlighted in red

Route information
- Auxiliary route of I-16
- Maintained by GDOT
- Length: 6.49 mi (10.44 km)
- Existed: 1985–present
- NHS: Entire route

Major junctions
- West end: SR 21 in Garden City
- US 80 / SR 25 / SR 25 Conn. / SR 26 in Savannah; I-16 / US 17 in Savannah; US 17 / US 80 / SR 25 / SR 26 in Savannah; Veterans Parkway in Savannah
- East end: SR 21 / Montgomery Street in Savannah

Location
- Country: United States
- State: Georgia
- Counties: Chatham

Highway system
- Interstate Highway System; Main; Auxiliary; Suffixed; Business; Future; Georgia State Highway System; Interstate; US; State; Special
← SR 515	→ I-520
← I-420	→ SR 422

Interstate 516 (I-516, also known as the W.F. Lynes Parkway) is a 6.49-mile-long (10.44 km) auxiliary Interstate Highway mostly in the coastal city of Savannah, located in the east-central portion of the U.S. state of Georgia. It is the only auxiliary route of I-16. For its entire length, I-516 is concurrent with State Route 21 (SR 21), which I-516 superseded in 1985. It was formerly also signed as State Route 26 Loop (SR 26 Loop). The highway also carries unsigned State Route 421 (SR 421) to ensure that all Interstates in Georgia had 400-series reference numbers.

== Route description ==
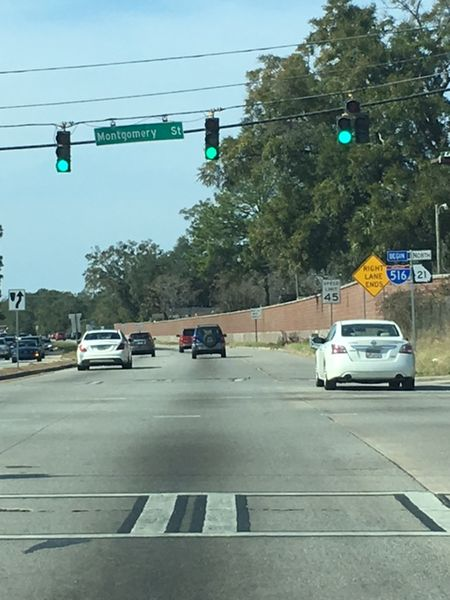
The eastern end of I-516 (W.F. Lynes Parkway) at DeRenne Avenue and Montgomery Street in Savannah, February 2017

I-516 begins in the northeastern part of Garden City, as a freeway continuation of SR 21 (Augusta Road), with which I-516 travels concurrently for its entire length. The two highways travel to the southeast to an interchange with SR 25/SR 26 Connector (Burnsed Blvd), which leads to U.S. Route 80 (US 80)/SR 26. At this interchange, SR 25 joins the concurrency. In the midst of this interchange is a crossing over the Dundee Canal. The three highways pass just southwest of the Mary Calder Golf Club. After beginning a curve to the south-southwest is an interchange with SR 25 Connector (West Bay Street). Here, US 80 and SR 26 join the concurrency. The five highways cross over the Savannah–Ogeechee Canal. A short distance later is an incomplete interchange with West Gwinnett Street. Almost immediately is an interchange with I-16/US 17 (Jim Gillis Historic Savannah Parkway). At this point, US 17 joins the concurrency. A short distance later is an incomplete interchange with Tremont Road. At Ogeechee Road, US 17/SR 25 depart the concurrency to the southwest, while US 80/SR 26 depart to the northeast. I-516/SR 21 continue to the south-southwest and have an interchange with the northern terminus of Veterans Parkway, just before curving to the east-southeast. They cross underneath, but do not have an interchange with, Liberty Parkway. They cross over some CSX Transportation railroad lines just before crossing over the Springfield Canal. Just west-northwest of Mildred Street, the freeway ends and the two highways continue to an intersection with Montgomery Street. At this point, I-516 meets its eastern terminus, while SR 21 (DeRenne Avenue) continues to the east-southeast.

I-516 is one of a small handful of Interstate Highways that is not a freeway for its entire length. The southeasternmost 0.5 miles (0.80 km) downgrades to an expressway with a 45 mph (72 km/h) speed limit, an at-grade intersection at Mildred Street, a right turn lane onto the De Renne Avenue frontage road, and a 35 mph (56 km/h) school zone designation following the frontage road right turn to the Interstate's eastern terminus at Montgomery Street. The southbound entrance onto Mildred Street is often closed by concrete barriers, as it's primarily used to directly access Hunter Army Air Field from the Interstate.

The entire length of I-516 is included as part of the National Highway System, a system of roadways important to the nation's economy, defense, and mobility.

== History ==
=== 1920s to 1960s ===
The road that would eventually be designated as I-516 was established at least as early as 1919 as a segment of SR 21 from the current western terminus of I-516 to an intersection with SR 26. In 1926, US 17/SR 25 were designated along this section of SR 21. Between 1963 and 1966, I-16 was under construction in Savannah, and the majority of what would become I-516, from Augusta Avenue to its current eastern terminus, was being proposed as SR 26 Loop. Later, in 1966, SR 26 Loop was completed (but not to freeway standards) from just east-southeast of what is now the Veterans Parkway exit to La Roche Avenue, with a proposal to extend it northward through Savannah State University. The rest of the proposed route was also under construction at that time. Also, the construction of I-16 continued to proceed. In 1967, the section from I-16 to just east-southeast of what is now the Veterans Parkway exit was still under construction but scheduled to open "Spring '68". I-16 was completed in Savannah at this time. In 1968, the segment of SR 26 Loop from I-16 to just east-southeast of what is now the Veterans Parkway exit was opened (at freeway standards).

=== 1970s to 2000s ===
By 1970, the segment from Augusta Avenue to I-16 was opened (at freeway standards). Later that year, there was a proposal to extend the western terminus a little farther to the west, to meet what is now US 80/SR 25 Connector/SR 26. Between 1977 and 1979, the entirety of SR 26 Loop, with the exception of the segment between Skidaway Road and La Roche Avenue, was redesignated as an extension of SR 21. The Skidaway–La Roche section was removed from the state highway system. Due to this, the proposal to extend SR 26 Loop from La Roche was removed, as well. By March 1980, the freeway portion was extended to the west, roughly along the same alignment proposed in 1970. In 1982, the freeway portion was extended a little more to the west, nearly to the current western terminus of I-516. In 1985, the entire highway from its then-current western terminus at Burnsed Blvd to Montgomery Street was designated as I-516. The freeway portion was extended westward to the interchange with SR 25 (Burnsed Blvd) and eastward to the current eastern terminus. Also US 17/SR 25 and US 80/SR 26 were rerouted along the freeway, from the West Bay Street exit to the Ogeechee Road exit. In 1995, US 17 had a major rerouting through the city of Savannah to its current alignment. Therefore, it is concurrent with I-516/SR 21 from the I-16 exit to the Ogeechee Road exit. In 2001, SR 421 was designated along I-516's length.

== Exit list ==
All exit numbers goes through an inverse pattern.

The entire route is in Chatham County.

Location	mi	km	Exit	Destinations	Notes
Garden City	0.0	0.0		SR 21 north (Augusta Road) – Springfield	Western end of SR 21 concurrency; western terminus; western end of the freeway; roadway continues as SR 21 northbound
Garden City	0.1	0.16	8	SR 25 north (Burnsed Road / SR 26 Conn. south) to US 80 (SR 26)	Western end of SR 25 concurrency; northern terminus of SR 26 Conn.; signed as “To US 80” on eastbound; signed as “SR 25” on westbound
Savannah	1.3	2.1	7B	West Lathrop Avenue – Georgia Ports Authority, Ocean Terminal	Westbound exit only
Savannah	1.6	2.6	7A	US 80 west / SR 25 Conn. north (Augusta Avenue / West Bay Street / SR 26 west) – Statesboro, Downtown Savannah	Western end of US 80/SR 26 concurrency; southern terminus of SR 25 Conn.; signed as SR 25 Conn. and exit 7 eastbound
Savannah	2.3	3.7	6	Gwinnett Street – Amtrak station	Westbound exit and eastbound entrance only
Savannah	2.5	4.0	5	I-16 (Jim Gillis Historic Savannah Parkway / SR 404) / US 17 north – Savannah, Macon	Western end of US 17 concurrency; I-16 exit 164
Savannah	3.2	5.1	4	Tremont Road	Westbound exit and eastbound entrance only
Savannah	3.8	6.1	3	US 17 south / US 80 east (Ogeechee Road / SR 25 south / SR 26 east) – Brunswick, Downtown Savannah	Eastern end of US 17/US 80/SR 25/SR 26 concurrency
	4.7	7.6	2	Veterans Parkway south – Georgetown	Northern terminus of Veterans Parkway
Savannah	6.9	11.1		SR 21 south (Derenne Avenue)	Eastern end of SR 21 concurrency; eastern terminus; eastern end of the freeway; roadway continues as SR 21 southbound
1.000 mi = 1.609 km; 1.000 km = 0.621 mi: Concurrency terminus; Incomplete access

== See also ==
- Jimmy DeLoach Parkway
- Savannah metropolitan area
