= Talahi Island, Georgia =

- Unincorporated community Census-designated place
- Location within Georgia
- Coordinates: 32°1′58″N 80°58′33″W
- Country: United States
- State: Georgia
- County: Chatham

Area
  - Total: 1.48 sq mi (3.83 km^{2})
  - Land: 1.29 sq mi (3.33 km^{2})
  - Water: 0.19 sq mi (0.49 km^{2})
- Elevation: 13 ft (4.0 m)

Population (2020)
  - Total: 1,247
  - Density: 969.0/sq mi (374.12/km^{2})
- Time zone: UTC-5 (Eastern (EST))
  - Summer (DST): UTC-4 (EDT)
- ZIP code: 31410
- Area code: 912
- FIPS code: 13-75239
- GNIS feature ID: 2583406

Talahi Island is a barrier island, unincorporated community, and census-designated place (CDP) in Chatham County, Georgia, United States. The population was 1,247 at the 2020 census. Located between Savannah and the beach resort town of Tybee Island, Talahi Island is part of the Savannah Metropolitan Statistical Area.

== Geography ==
The Talahi Island CDP is located in eastern Chatham County on the island of the same name, one of several islands lying in the tidal marshes between Savannah and the Atlantic Ocean. It is bordered to the northeast by the Bull River, to the northwest by Turner Creek, and to the south by Wilmington Island. U.S. Route 80 passes through the island community, leading west 8 miles (13 km) into Savannah and east 9 miles (14 km) to the highway's end at Tybee Island on the Atlantic shore.

According to the United States Census Bureau, the Talahi Island CDP has a total area of 1.5 square miles (3.8 km^{2}), of which 1.3 square miles (3.3 km^{2}) is land and 0.19 square miles (0.5 km^{2}), or 12.86%, is water.

== Demographics ==
Historical population
Census	Pop.	Note	%±
2010	1,248		—
2020	1,247		−0.1%
U.S. Decennial Census; 1850-1870 1870-1880; 1890-1910 1920-1930; 1940 1950 1960; 1970 1980 1990; 2000 2010 2020

Talahi Island was first listed as a census designated place in the 2010 U.S. census.

=== Racial and ethnic composition ===
Talahi Island, Georgia – Racial and ethnic composition Note: the US Census treats Hispanic/Latino as an ethnic category. This table excludes Latinos from the racial categories and assigns them to a separate category. Hispanics/Latinos may be of any race.
Race / Ethnicity (NH = Non-Hispanic)	Pop 2010	Pop 2020	% 2010	% 2020
White alone (NH)	1,161	1,133	93.03%	90.86%
Black or African American alone (NH)	29	20	2.32%	1.60%
Native American or Alaska Native alone (NH)	1	4	0.08%	0.32%
Asian alone (NH)	29	27	2.32%	2.17%
Pacific Islander alone (NH)	0	0	0.00%	0.00%
Other race alone (NH)	1	6	0.08%	0.48%
Mixed race or Multiracial (NH)	10	22	0.80%	1.76%
Hispanic or Latino (any race)	17	35	1.36%	2.81%
Total	1,248	1,247	100.00%	100.00%

=== 2020 census ===
As of the 2020 census, Talahi Island had a population of 1,247. The median age was 52.1 years. 18.5% of residents were under the age of 18 and 27.6% were 65 years of age or older. For every 100 females there were 98.9 males, and for every 100 females age 18 and over there were 96.5 males age 18 and over.

100.0% of residents lived in urban areas, while 0.0% lived in rural areas.

There were 506 households in Talahi Island, of which 24.9% had children under the age of 18 living in them. Of all households, 65.0% were married-couple households, 10.9% were households with a male householder and no spouse or partner present, and 18.0% were households with a female householder and no spouse or partner present. About 19.8% of all households were made up of individuals and 11.2% had someone living alone who was 65 years of age or older.

There were 523 housing units, of which 3.3% were vacant. The homeowner vacancy rate was 0.2% and the rental vacancy rate was 6.3%.
