= Pooler, Georgia =

- City
- City of Pooler
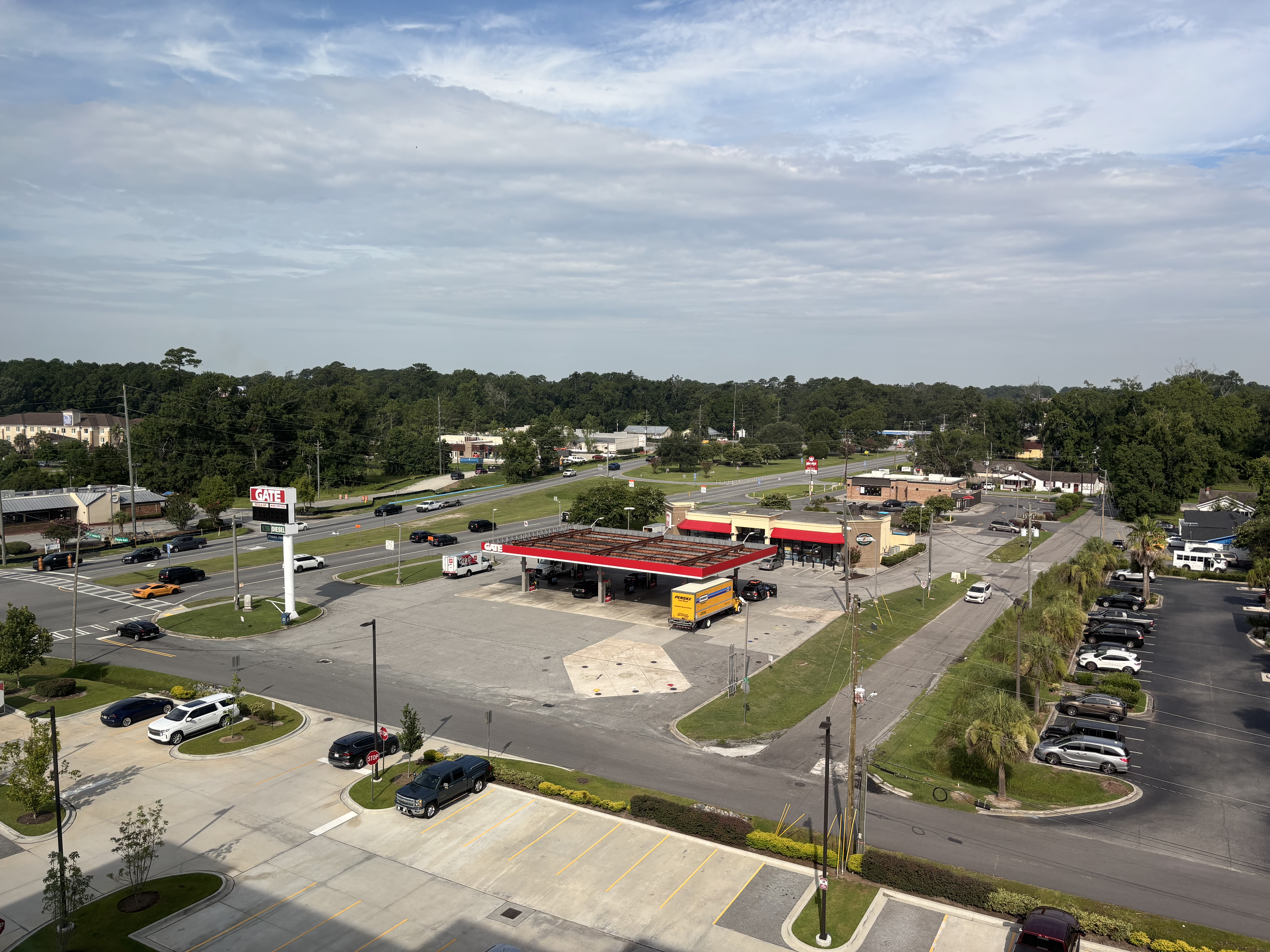
- Parsons Avenue in Pooler

- Seal Logo
- Motto: Pride, Family, Honor
- Location in Chatham County and the state of Georgia
- Coordinates: 32°6′17″N 81°15′12″W
- Country: United States
- State: Georgia
- County: Chatham
- First settled: 1838
- Incorporated as a town: 1907
- Incorporated as a city: 1976

Government
  - Type: Council-manager government
  - Mayor: Karen L. Williams
  - City Manager: Heath Lloyd
  - Mayor Pro Tem: Aaron C. Henry
  - City Clerk: Kiley Fusco

Area
  - Total: 27.90 sq mi (72.25 km^{2})
  - Land: 27.71 sq mi (71.76 km^{2})
  - Water: 0.19 sq mi (0.49 km^{2})
- Elevation: 20 ft (6.1 m)

Population (2020)
  - Total: 25,711
  - Estimate (2024): 31,171
  - Density: 928.0/sq mi (358.3/km^{2})
- Time zone: UTC−5 (Eastern (EST))
  - Summer (DST): UTC−4 (EDT)
- ZIP Code: 31322
- Area codes: 912, 565
- FIPS code: 13-62104
- GNIS feature ID: 0332725
- Website: pooler-ga.gov

Pooler is a city in Chatham County, Georgia, United States. As of the 2020 census, Pooler had a population of 25,711. Pooler is located northwest of Savannah along Interstates 95 and 16. It comprises part of the Savannah metropolitan area.

== History ==
The city was named for railroad employee Robert William Pooler.

During the Civil War, Pooler was a railway stop called Pooler's Station—the last stop before Savannah on the Central of Georgia Railway. In December 1864, Pooler was a meeting place for Union officers led by William Tecumseh Sherman, who negotiated with Savannah authorities for the strategic port city's peaceful surrender.

== Geography ==
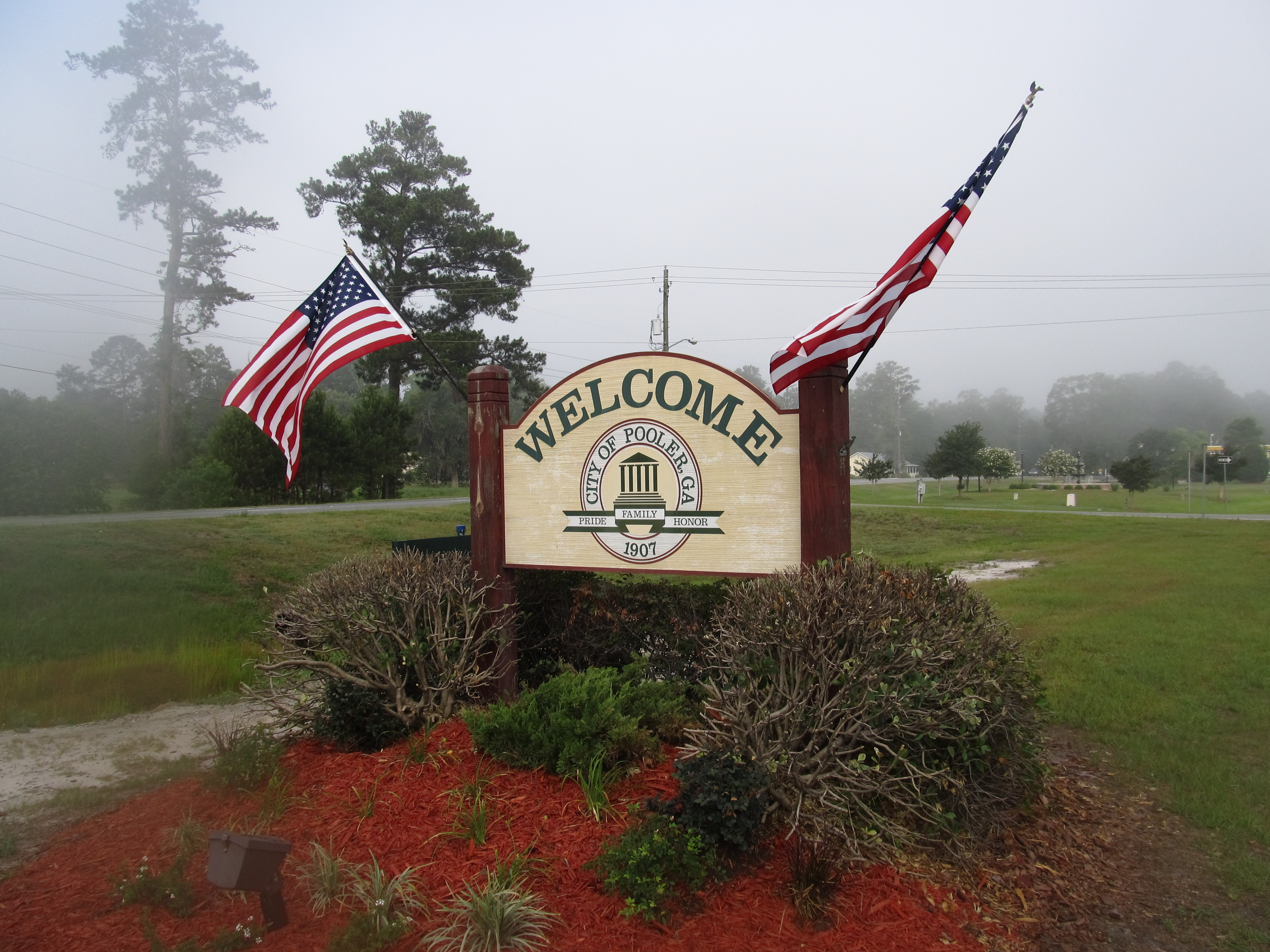
Welcome to Pooler, Georgia.

Pooler is located in northwestern Chatham County at 32°6′17″N 81°15′12″W. It is bordered by Port Wentworth to the north, Garden City to the east, Savannah to the north and south, and Bloomingdale to the west. U.S. Route 80 intersects Interstate 95 just east of the city center; US 80 leads 9 miles (14 km) east to downtown Savannah, while I-95 leads north into South Carolina and south 132 miles (212 km) to Jacksonville, Florida.

According to the United States Census Bureau, Pooler has a total area of 30.3 square miles (78.6 km^{2}), of which 29.4 square miles (76.1 km^{2}) is land and 0.97 square miles (2.5 km^{2}), or 3.18%, is water.

== Demographics ==
Historical population
Census	Pop.	Note	%±
1910	337		—
1920	443		31.5%
1930	499		12.6%
1940	736		47.5%
1950	818		11.1%
1960	1,073		31.2%
1970	1,517		41.4%
1980	2,540		67.4%
1990	4,453		75.3%
2000	6,239		40.1%
2010	19,140		206.8%
2020	25,711		34.3%
2025 (est.)	32,744	▲	27.4%
U.S. Decennial Census; 2025

=== 2020 census ===
As of the 2020 census, Pooler had a population of 25,711 living in 10,272 households, including 6,130 families. The median age was 36.7 years. 22.2% of residents were under the age of 18 and 13.2% of residents were 65 years of age or older. For every 100 females there were 94.5 males, and for every 100 females age 18 and over there were 91.0 males age 18 and over.

99.1% of residents lived in urban areas, while 0.9% lived in rural areas.

Among households, 31.5% had children under the age of 18 living in them. Of all households, 48.5% were married-couple households, 18.1% were households with a male householder and no spouse or partner present, and 26.7% were households with a female householder and no spouse or partner present. About 27.5% of all households were made up of individuals and 7.5% had someone living alone who was 65 years of age or older.

There were 11,102 housing units, of which 7.5% were vacant. The homeowner vacancy rate was 2.5% and the rental vacancy rate was 10.0%.

Racial composition as of the 2020 census
Race	Number	Percent
White	13,957	54.3%
Black or African American	6,928	26.9%
American Indian and Alaska Native	122	0.5%
Asian	1,546	6.0%
Native Hawaiian and Other Pacific Islander	47	0.2%
Some other race	1,045	4.1%
Two or more races	2,066	8.0%
Hispanic or Latino (of any race)	2,400	9.3%

=== 2010 census ===
In the 2010 census, the racial makeup of the city was 65.4% White, 25.4% African American, 0.2% Native American, 3.8% Asian, 0.1% Pacific Islander, 2.2% from other races, and 2.9% from two or more races. Hispanic or Latino of any race were 6.6% of the population.

There were 7,300 households, out of which 35.6% had children under the age of 18 living with them, 56.1% were married couples living together, 11.4% had a female householder with no husband present, and 29.0% were non-families. 22.5% of all households were made up of individuals, and 4.1% had someone living alone who was 65 years of age or older. The average household size was 2.61 and the average family size was 3.09.

In the city, the population was spread out, with 26.2% under the age of 18, 8.1% from 18 to 24, 34.9% from 25 to 44, 23.2% from 45 to 64, and 7.6% who were 65 years of age or older. The median age was 33.2 years. For every 100 females, there were 97.3 males.

The median income for a household in the city was $71,737, and the median income for a family was $78,419. Males had a median income of $53,854 versus $38,401 for females. The per capita income for the city was $30,336. About 5.4% of families and 6.4% of the population were below the poverty line, including 8.4% of those between ages 18 and 15. 26.1% of those age 65 or over.

== Government ==
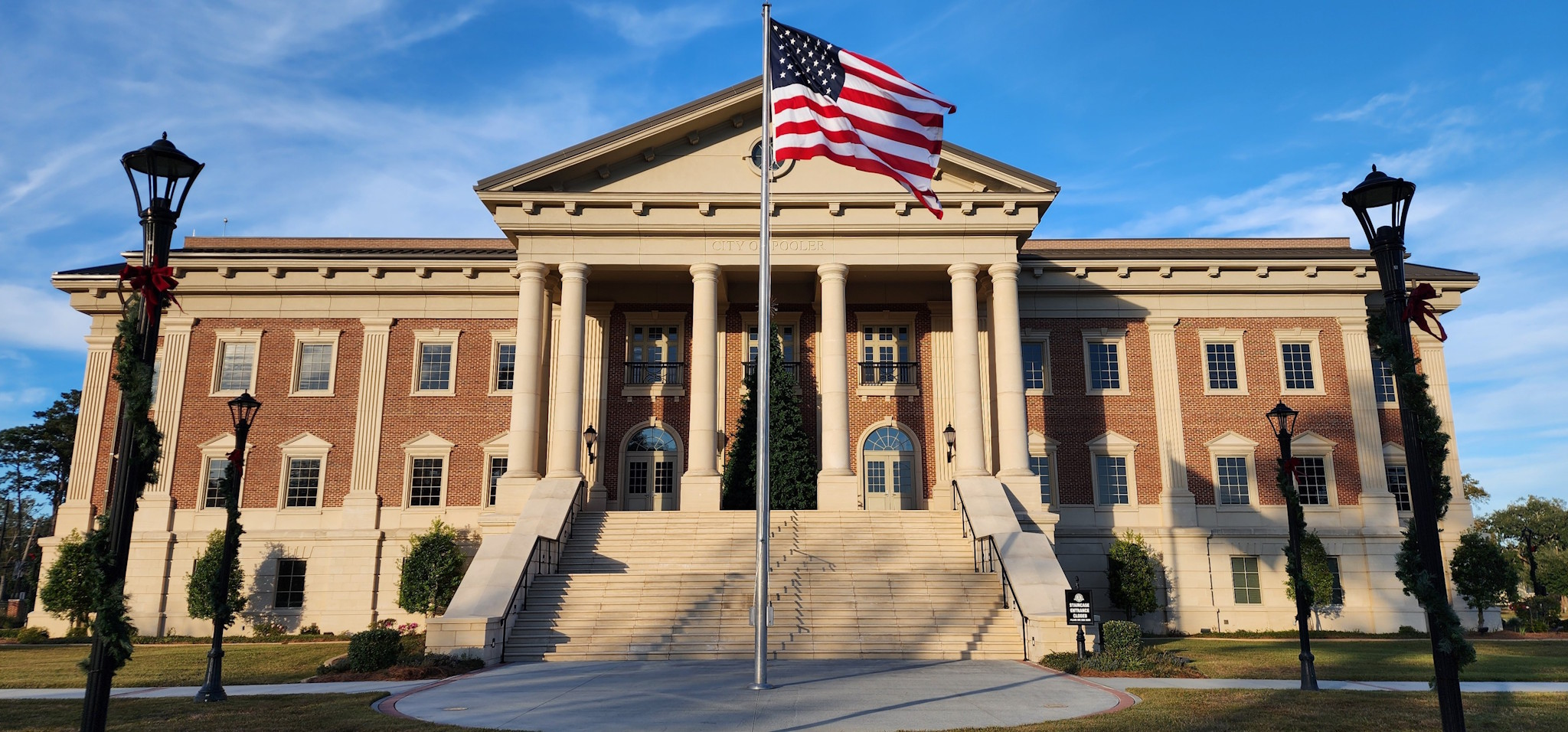
Pooler City Hall

Pooler city government is a council-manager form of municipal government with a weak-Mayor and six at-large city council members. Council and mayor are elected every four years to four-year terms, one year prior to the presidential election year. In 2018, Pooler officially opened a new municipal government complex, including a new city hall & municipal court building.

The 51,500-square-foot city hall is a three-story building housing several of the city's departments: the Pooler Police Department on the first floor, administrative, financial, & City Clerk offices on the second, and the city council chambers, city manager's office, and other executive functions on the third. The municipal court building is 6,350-square-foot.

Pooler City Hall was used as the on-screen stand-in for the Chatham County Courthouse in Clint Eastwood's 2024 film, Juror No. 2. While several key scenes were filmed in and around the building, the courtroom and jury room scenes were filmed at a different location.

== Economy ==
Pooler has successfully attracted major companies, including construction equipment manufacturer JCB, which established its North American headquarters in the city, and Blue Force Gear, a tactical gear producer headquartered in Pooler. Just outside Pooler's limits is Gulfstream Aerospace, near the Savannah-Hilton Head International Airport, one of the largest private jet manufacturers in the United States and a significant employer in the Savannah-Pooler area. Additionally, the Hyundai Motor Group Metaplant America, is located 12 miles (19 km) west along I-16 and is projected to employ at least 8,500 workers upon its completion in 2031 with easy access to/from Pooler via Pooler Parkway, Jimmy DeLoach Parkway, Interstate 16, & U.S. Route 80.

Pooler is also a retail destination, with shopping attractions such as Tanger Outlets in Godley Station, Costco at the Mosaic Center, and a Wawa convenience store set to open in Spring 2025. The city's low crime rate, small-town charm, and strong community atmosphere have contributed to its rapid growth and appeal in the greater Savannah area. Pooler is one of Georgia's fastest-growing cities.

== Notable people ==
- Jared Wade, country music singer-songwriter
- Buddy Carter, U.S. representative for 1st district of Georgia

== See also ==
- Mighty Eighth Air Force Museum
