= Bloomingdale, Georgia =

- City
- Seal

- Location in Chatham County and the state of Georgia
- Coordinates: 32°7′27″N 81°18′26″W
- Country: United States
- State: Georgia
- County: Chatham
- Established: 1840

Area
  - Total: 14.05 sq mi (36.39 km^{2})
  - Land: 13.78 sq mi (35.69 km^{2})
  - Water: 0.27 sq mi (0.70 km^{2})
- Elevation: 20 ft (6.1 m)

Population (2020)
  - Total: 2,790
  - Density: 202.5/sq mi (78.17/km^{2})
- Time zone: UTC−05:00 (Eastern (EST))
  - Summer (DST): UTC−04:00 (EDT)
- ZIP code: 31302
- Area code: 912
- FIPS code: 13-08844
- GNIS feature ID: 0331192
- Website: www.bloomingdale-ga.gov

Bloomingdale is a city in Chatham County, Georgia, United States. As of the 2020 census, the city had a population of 2,790. It is part of the Savannah metropolitan statistical area.

== Geography ==
Bloomingdale is located along the northwestern border of Chatham County at 32°7′27″N 81°18′26″W (32.124122, -81.307211). It is bordered to the northeast by Port Wentworth, to the east by Pooler, to the south by a western portion of Savannah, and to the northwest by Effingham County. U.S. Route 80 runs east–west through the center of Bloomingdale, and Interstate 16 runs parallel to it through the southern part of the city, with access from Exit 152. Both highways lead east 13 miles (21 km) to downtown Savannah.

According to the United States Census Bureau, Bloomingdale has a total area of 14.0 square miles (36.3 km^{2}), of which 12.8 square miles (33.1 km^{2}) is land and 1.2 square miles (3.2 km^{2}), or 8.90%, is water.

== Demographics ==
Historical population
Census	Pop.	Note	%±
1980	1,855		—
1990	2,271		22.4%
2000	2,665		17.3%
2010	2,713		1.8%
2020	2,790		2.8%
U.S. Decennial Census

=== 2020 census ===
As of the 2020 census, Bloomingdale had a population of 2,790. The median age was 40.0 years. 22.2% of residents were under the age of 18 and 16.7% of residents were 65 years of age or older. For every 100 females there were 103.4 males, and for every 100 females age 18 and over there were 100.6 males age 18 and over.

71.8% of residents lived in urban areas, while 28.2% lived in rural areas.

There were 1,114 households in Bloomingdale, of which 30.2% had children under the age of 18 living in them. Of all households, 43.4% were married-couple households, 21.2% were households with a male householder and no spouse or partner present, and 27.7% were households with a female householder and no spouse or partner present. About 27.6% of all households were made up of individuals and 10.6% had someone living alone who was 65 years of age or older. There were 791 families residing in the city.

There were 1,319 housing units, of which 15.5% were vacant. The homeowner vacancy rate was 2.1% and the rental vacancy rate was 15.6%.

Bloomingdale racial composition as of 2020
Race	Num.	Perc.
White (non-Hispanic)	2,097	75.16%
Black or African American (non-Hispanic)	309	11.08%
Native American	14	0.5%
Asian	27	0.97%
Other/Mixed	163	5.84%
Hispanic or Latino	180	6.45%
