= Savannah metropolitan area =

- Metropolitan statistical area
- Savannah metropolitan statistical area
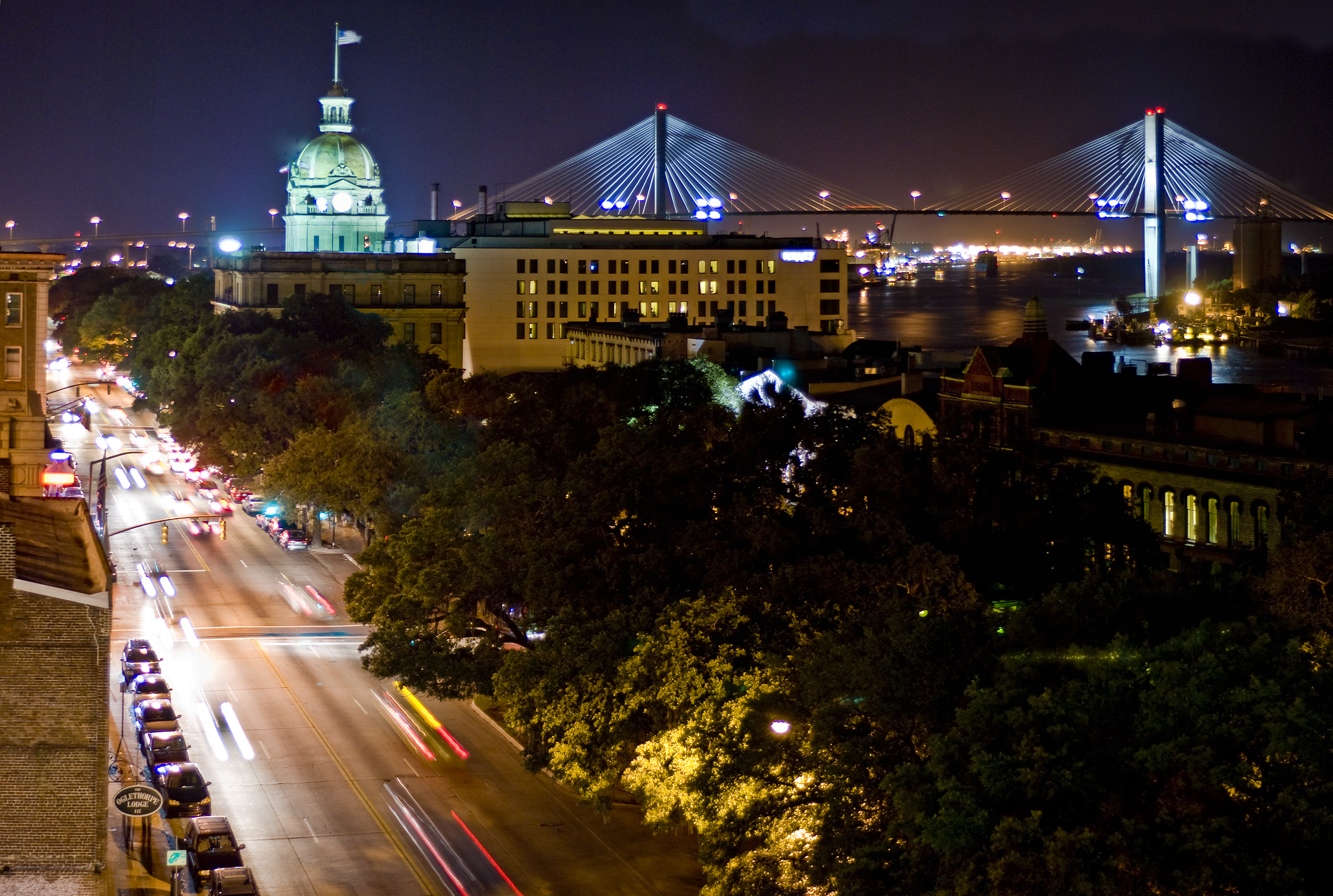
- Downtown Savannah
Map of Savannah–Hinesville–Statesboro, GA CSA
City of Savannah
Savannah, GA MSA
Statesboro, GA μSA
Hinesville, GA MSA
Jesup, GA μSA
- Country: United States
- State: Georgia
- Largest city: Savannah
- Other cities: Hinesville; Statesboro; Jesup

Area
  - Metro: 1,569 sq mi (4,060 km^{2})
  - CSA: 3,265 sq mi (8,460 km^{2})

Population (est. 2025)
  - Density: 238/sq mi (92/km^{2})
  - Metro: 438,314 (126th)
  - CSA: 660,642 (81st)
  - CSA density: 161/sq mi (62/km^{2})

GDP
  - Metro: $29.452 billion (2022)
- Time zone: UTC-5 (EST)
  - Summer (DST): UTC-4 (EDT)
- ZIP code: 30415; 30450; 30452; 30458 - 30461; 31301 - 31304; 31306 - 31318; 31320 - 31326; 31333; 31401 - 31421; 31545 - 31546; 31555; 31560; 31598 - 31599
- Area codes: 912, 565

The Savannah metropolitan area, officially named the Savannah metropolitan statistical area by the U.S. Office of Management and Budget, is a metropolitan statistical area in the U.S. state of Georgia. It is centered on the city of Savannah and encompasses three counties: Bryan, Chatham, and Effingham.

The population of this area was 404,798 at the 2020 U.S. census, an increase of more than 57,000 residents from the 2010 census figure of 347,611. This was a gain of 16.45% over the same decade, making Savannah the fastest-growing metro area in the state for the period 2010–2020. (It was followed by Atlanta, Gainesville, and Warner Robins.) Savannah is the third most populous of Georgia's fourteen metropolitan areas (after Atlanta and Augusta). Savannah and its metropolitan area form the largest economic sector of Coastal Georgia, followed by the Brunswick and Hinesville metropolitan areas. Two of these areas, Savannah and Hinesville, form the core of the Savannah–Hinesville–Statesboro combined statistical area. The combined statistical area had a 2020 population of 608,239.

== Geography ==
The Savannah metropolitan area is located in the Coastal Georgia region, and is its most populous urban area. The three counties comprising the metropolitan area make up a total area of 1,569 square miles (4,060 km^{2}), roughly the size of the U.S. state of Rhode Island at 1,545 square miles (4,000 km^{2}).

=== Metropolitan counties ===
County	Seat	2025 estimate	2020 Census	Change	Land area	Density
Chatham	Savannah	311,855	295,291	+5.61%	426 sq mi (1,100 km^{2})	732/sq mi (283/km^{2})
Effingham	Springfield	74,397	64,769	+14.87%	478 sq mi (1,240 km^{2})	156/sq mi (60/km^{2})
Bryan	Pembroke	52,062	44,738	+16.37%	436 sq mi (1,130 km^{2})	119/sq mi (46/km^{2})
Total		438,314	404,798	+8.28%	1,340 sq mi (3,500 km^{2})	327/sq mi (126/km^{2})

=== Principal communities ===
(Note: "census-designated places" are unincorporated)

==== Places with more than 140,000 inhabitants ====
- Savannah (principal city)

==== Places with 25,000 to 50,000 inhabitants ====
- Pooler

==== Places with 10,000 to 25,000 inhabitants ====
- Garden City
- Georgetown (census-designated place)
- Port Wentworth
- Richmond Hill
- Rincon
- Wilmington Island (census-designated place)

==== Places with 5,000 to 10,000 inhabitants ====
- Skidaway Island (census-designated place)
- Whitemarsh Island (census-designated place)

==== Places with 1,000 to 5,000 inhabitants ====
- Bloomingdale
- Guyton
- Henderson
- Isle of Hope (census-designated place)
- Montgomery (census-designated place)
- Pembroke
- Springfield
- Thunderbolt
- Tybee Island

==== Places with fewer than 1,000 inhabitants ====
- Vernonburg

==== Unincorporated places with fewer than 1,000 inhabitants ====
- Keller
- Pin Point

== Demographics ==
Historical population
Census	Pop.	Note	%±
1960	204,669		—
1970	207,938		1.6%
1980	239,196		15.0%
1990	258,060		7.9%
2000	293,000		13.5%
2010	347,611		18.6%
2020	404,798		16.5%
2025 (est.)	438,314		8.3%

At the 2000 United States census, the Savannah metropolitan area grew to 293,000 people, 111,105 households, and 76,405 families. In 2010, its metropolitan population was 347,611; and by the 2020 U.S. census, its population grew to a total of 404,798 residents. According to the latest 2024 U.S. Census estimate (2024), the MSA's population was 431,589.

According to the 2000 census, the racial and ethnic makeup of the MSA was 61.24% White, 34.87% African American, 0.26% Native American, 1.49% Asian, 0.06% Pacific Islander, 0.82% from other races, and 1.26% from two or more races; Hispanics or Latinos of any race were 2.18% of the population. According to the 2022 American Community Survey, its racial and ethnic makeup was 53% White, 32% African American, 2% Asian, 1% some other race, 5% two or more races, and 7% Hispanic or Latino of any race.

In 2000, the median income for a household in the MSA was $44,201, and the median income for a family was $50,052. Males had a median income of $37,992 versus $24,777 for females. The per capita income for the MSA was $19,940. In 2022, the median household income within the MSA was $72,098 with a per capita income of $37,044. An estimated 37% of the population made less than $50,000 and 30% made from $50,000-$100,000 annually. Approximately 14% of the Savannah metropolitan area lived at or below the poverty line.

=== Religion ===
Since British colonization of the Americas, and the establishment of the Province of Georgia, Christianity grew to become the present-day metropolitan area's dominant religion, with Native American religions declining in practice, though the Gullah-Geechee communities also brought West African religions and derivatives including Hoodoo to the area. In some Gullah communities within the Savannah metropolitan area, Hoodoo is still practiced to the present day alongside other West African religions.

According to the Association of Religion Data Archives in 2020, the overall largest Christian group were Protestants within the Baptist tradition, served by the Southern Baptist Convention, National Baptist Convention, National Missionary Baptist Convention, and Progressive National Baptist Convention. Following, non-denominational Protestants represented the second-largest overall Christian group, including the Christian churches and Churches of Christ. Methodists were the third-largest, spread among the United Methodist Church and African Methodist Episcopal Church. The single-second largest Christian denomination was the Catholic Church, served by the Diocese of Savannah.

Among its non-Christian population, which forms a minority in the metropolitan area and Coastal Georgia overall, Hinduism was the area's second-largest religion. Judaism was Savannah's third-largest religion, being present since the 1700s. Orthodox Judaism, Reform Judaism, and Conservative Judaism were the predominant Jewish traditions adhered to; and Islam was the area's fourth-largest religion, followed by the Baha'i Faith. Within the area, the oldest continually-functioning Jewish synagogue is Congregation Mickve Israel. Congregation Mickve Israel is the third-oldest synagogue within the United States.

== Combined statistical area ==
The Savannah–Hinesville–Statesboro combined statistical area is made up of eight counties in Georgia. The official 2020 U.S. census population for this area was 608,239.

=== Metro- and micropolitan divisions ===
Two metropolitan statistical areas (MSAs) and two micropolitan statistical areas (μSAs) form this CSA.

Savannah–Hinesville–Statesboro CSA
Component	Counties	2025 estimate	2020 census	Change
Savannah metropolitan statistical area	Chatham, Effingham, Bryan	438,314	404,798	+8.28%
Hinesville metropolitan statistical area	Liberty, Long	91,870	81,424	+12.83%
Statesboro micropolitan statistical area	Bulloch, Evans	97,977	91,873	+6.64%
Jesup micropolitan statistical area	Wayne	32,481	30,144	+7.75%
Total		660,642	608,239	+8.62%

== Economy ==
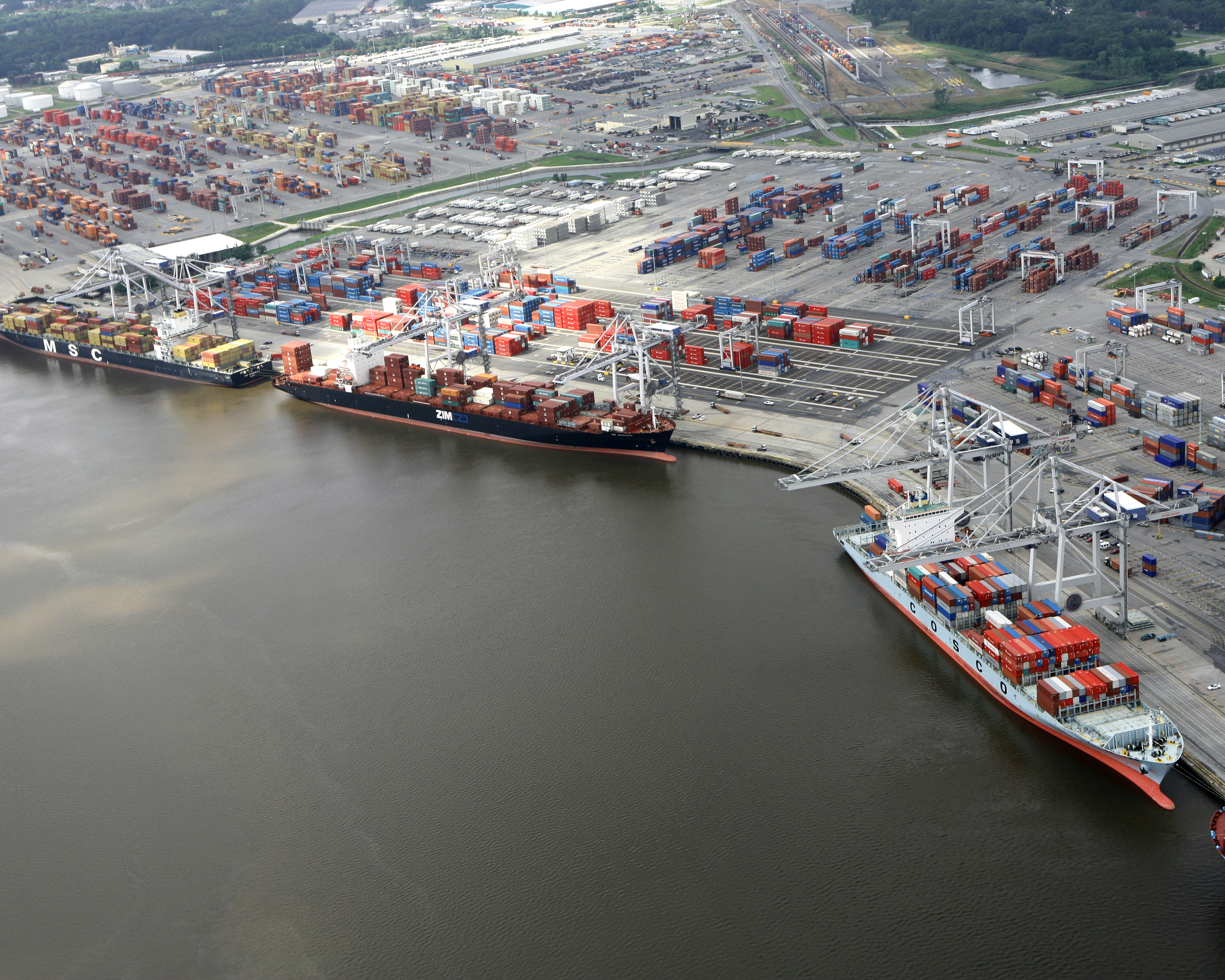
Port of Savannah

Much of coastal Georgia's economy is centered in the Savannah metropolitan area and in the wider Savannah-Hinesville-Statesboro-Jesup combined statistical area. The economy has been primarily stimulated by the Port of Savannah and by military facilities, medical centers, and colleges and universities. In the nineteenth century, Savannah became one of the most active ports in the United States, as goods produced in the New World had to pass through Atlantic ports such as Savannah before they could be shipped to England. In 2022, the Port of Savannah handled some 5.7 million 20-foot-equivalent container units (TEU).

Education is also a dominant factor in the economic health of the metropolitan area as well as the greater combined statistical area. Major educational institutions include Georgia Southern University's flagship campus in Statesboro and its Armstrong campus in Savannah. Savannah State University, South University, Georgia Tech Savannah, Savannah Technical College, and the Savannah College of Art and Design are other important institutions by enrollment and financial impact.

Corporations such as Gulfstream Aerospace Corporation and J.C. Bamford Excavators established their North American headquarters within the Savannah metropolitan area. Banking is also a significant presence in the Savannah metropolitan area, including Chase Bank and Wells Fargo.

== Sports ==
=== Professional sport teams ===
Team	Sport	League	Venue	Championships	Years
Savannah Braves	Baseball	Southern League	Grayson Stadium		1971–1983
Savannah Cardinals / Savannah Sand Gnats	Baseball	South Atlantic League	Grayson Stadium	4 (1993, 1994, 1996, 2013)	1984–2015
Savannah Spirits	Basketball	Continental Basketball Association	Savannah Civic Center		1986–1988
Savannah Wildcats	Basketball	Continental Basketball League	Georgia Southern University–Armstrong Campus	1 (2010)	2010
Savannah Storm / C-Port Trojans	Basketball	East Coast Basketball League	Savannah High School		2010–2018
Savannah Steam	American football	American Indoor Football	Tiger Arena		2015–2016
Savannah Bananas	Baseball	Coastal Plain League / Banana Ball Championship League	Grayson Stadium	3 (2016, 2021, 2022)	2016–present
Savannah Clovers FC	Soccer	United Premier Soccer League / National Independent Soccer Association	Memorial Stadium	1 (2019)	2016–present
Savannah Ghost Pirates	Ice hockey	ECHL	Enmarket Arena		2022–present
Savannah Buccaneers	Basketball	The Basketball League	Tiger Arena		2023–present

=== Collegiate sports teams ===
Club	Affiliation	Conference	Venues	Notes
Savannah College of Art and Design Bees	NAIA	Sun Conference	SCAD Athletic Complex, Ronald C. Waranch Equestrian Center	
Savannah State Tigers and Lady Tigers	NCAA Division II	Southern Intercollegiate Athletic Conference	Tiger Arena, Ted Wright Stadium	

== Transportation ==
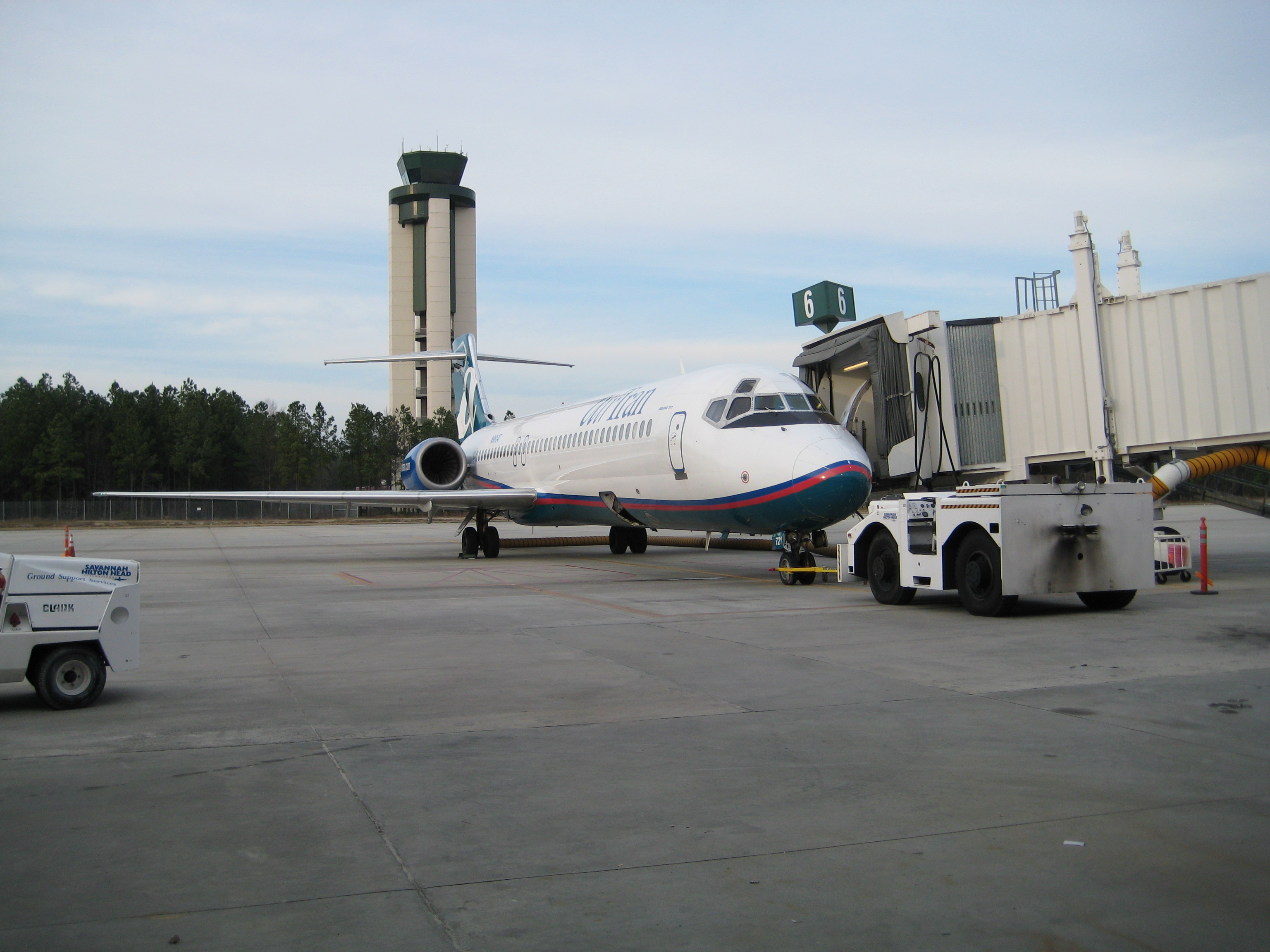
Savannah/Hilton Head International Airport

=== Air ===
- Savannah/Hilton Head International Airport

=== Highways ===
- Interstate 95 — Runs north–south just west of the city; provides access to Savannah/Hilton Head International Airport and intersects with Interstate 16, which leads into the city's center.
- Interstate 16 — Terminates in downtown Savannah at Liberty and Montgomery streets, and intersects with Interstate 95 and Interstate 516.
- Interstate 516 — An urban perimeter highway connecting southside Savannah, at DeRenne Avenue, with the industrialized port area of the city to the north; intersects with the Veterans Parkway and Interstate 16 as well. Also known as Lynes Parkway.
- U.S. Route 80 (Victory Drive) — Runs east–west through midtown Savannah and connects the city with the town of Thunderbolt and the islands of Whitemarsh, Talahi, Wilmington and Tybee. Merges with the Islands Expressway and serves as the only means of reaching the Atlantic Ocean by automobile.
- U.S. Route 17 (Ocean Highway) — Runs north–south from Richmond Hill, through southside Savannah, into Garden City, back into west Savannah with a spur onto I-516, then I-16, and finally continuing over the Talmadge Memorial Bridge into South Carolina.
- Harry S. Truman Parkway — Runs through eastside Savannah, connecting the east end of downtown with southside neighborhoods. Construction began in 1990 and opened in phases (the last phase, connecting with Abercorn Street, was completed in 2014).
- Veterans Parkway — Links Interstate 516 and southside/midtown Savannah with southside Savannah, and is intended to move traffic quicker from north–south by avoiding high-volume Abercorn Street. Also known as the Southwest Bypass.
- Islands Expressway — An extension of President Street to facilitate traffic moving between downtown Savannah, the barrier islands and the beaches of Tybee Island.

== See also ==
- Georgia census statistical areas
