= Chatham County, Georgia =

County in Georgia, United States

- County
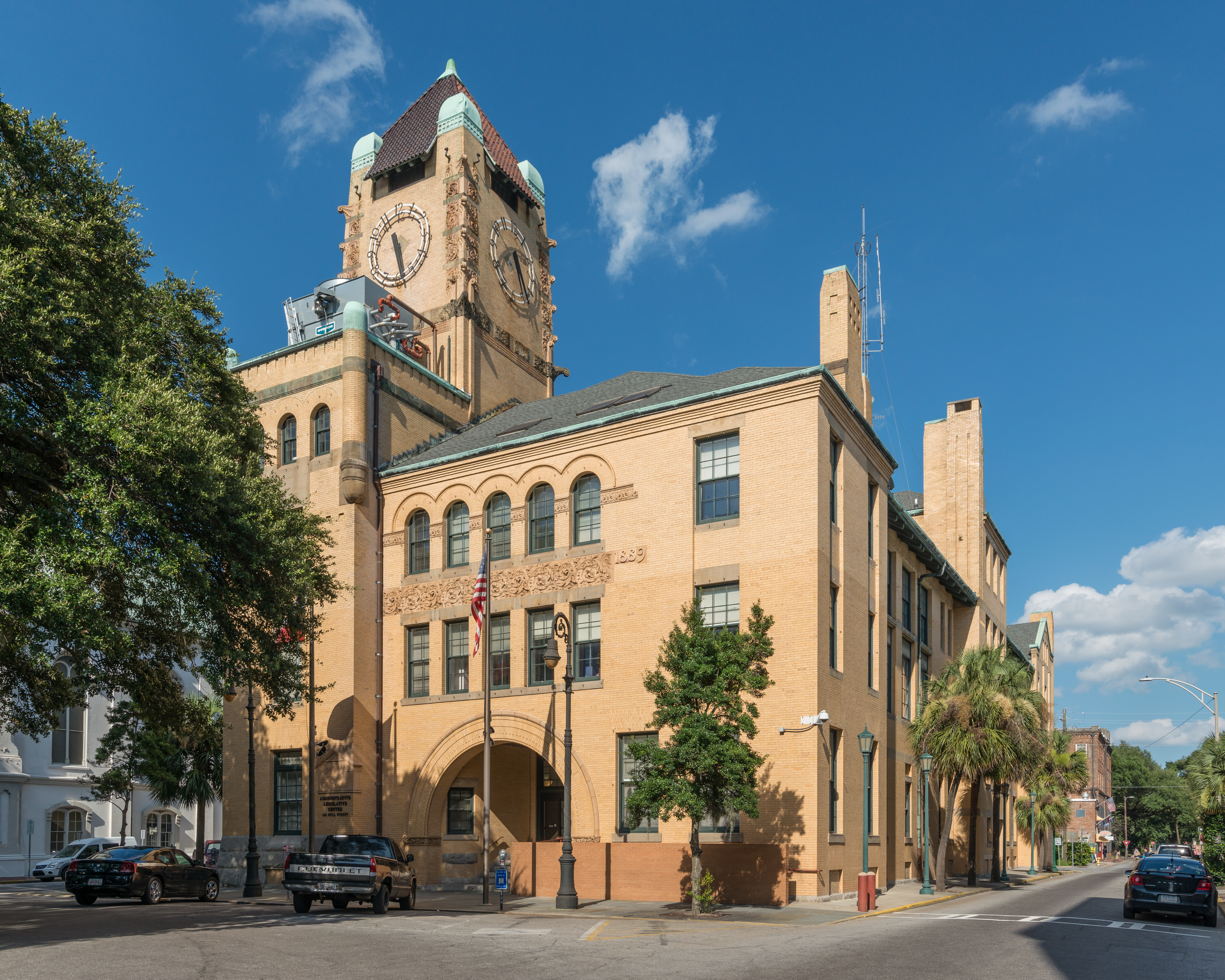
- Chatham County Administrative and Legislative Center in Savannah

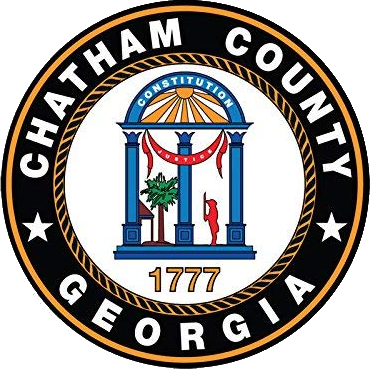
- Seal

- Location within the U.S. state of Georgia
- Coordinates: 31°58′N 81°05′W
- Country: United States
- State: Georgia
- Founded: February 5, 1777; 249 years ago
- Named for: William Pitt, 1st Earl of Chatham
- Seat: Savannah
- Largest city: Savannah

Area
  - Total: 632 sq mi (1,640 km^{2})
  - Land: 426 sq mi (1,100 km^{2})
  - Water: 206 sq mi (530 km^{2}) 32.6%

Population (2020)
  - Total: 295,291
  - Estimate (2025): 311,855 ▲
  - Density: 693/sq mi (268/km^{2})
- Time zone: UTC−5 (Eastern)
  - Summer (DST): UTC−4 (EDT)
- Congressional district: 1st
- Website: chathamcountyga.gov

Chatham County (/ˈtʃætəm/ CHAT-əm) is the easternmost county in the U.S. state of Georgia, on the state's Atlantic coast. The county seat and largest city is Savannah. One of the original counties of Georgia, Chatham County was created February 5, 1777, and is named after William Pitt, 1st Earl of Chatham.

The U.S. Census Bureau's 2025 estimated population for Chatham County was 311,855 residents. The official 2020 U.S. census population was 295,291 residents, an increase of 11.4% from the official 2010 population of 265,128. Chatham County is the fifth-most-populous county in Georgia, and the state's most populous outside the Atlanta metropolitan area. The county is the core of the Savannah metropolitan area.

== Geography ==
According to the U.S. Census Bureau, the county has a total area of 632 sq mi (1,640 km^{2}), of which 206 sq mi (530 km^{2}) (32.6%) is covered by water.

Chatham County is the northernmost of Georgia's coastal counties on the Atlantic Ocean. It is bounded on the northeast by the Savannah River, and in the southwest bounded by the Ogeechee River.

The bulk of Chatham County, an area with a northern border in a line from Bloomingdale to Tybee Island, is located in the Ogeechee River Coastal subbasin of the Ogeechee River basin. The portion of the county north of that line is located in the lower Savannah River subbasin of the Savannah River basin, while the very southern fringes of the Chatham County are located in the lower Ogeechee River subbasin of the Ogeechee River basin.

=== Major highways ===
- I-16 / SR 404 (unsigned)
  - SR 404 Spur
- I-95 / SR 405 (unsigned)
- I-516 / SR 421 (unsigned)
- US 17
- US 80 / SR 26
  - SR 26 Conn.
- SR 17
  - SR 17 Conn.
- SR 21
  - SR 21 Spur
  - SR 21 Alt.
- SR 25
  - SR 25 Conn.
- SR 30
- SR 204
  - SR 204 Spur (decommissioned)
- SR 307
- SR 565 (Savannah River Parkway)

=== Adjacent counties ===
- Jasper County, South Carolina – north
- Beaufort County, South Carolina – northeast
- Bryan County – west/southwest
- Liberty County - southeast
- Effingham County – northwest

=== National protected areas ===
- Fort Pulaski National Monument
- Savannah National Wildlife Refuge (part)
- Wassaw National Wildlife Refuge

== Communities ==
=== Municipalities ===
==== Cities ====
- Bloomingdale
- Garden City
- Pooler
- Port Wentworth
- Savannah (county seat)
- Tybee Island

==== Towns ====
- Thunderbolt
- Vernonburg

=== Census-designated places ===
- Dutch Island
- Georgetown
- Henderson
- Isle of Hope
- Montgomery
- Skidaway Island
- Talahi Island
- Whitemarsh Island
- Wilmington Island

=== Other unincorporated communities ===
- Pin Point
- Sandfly

== Demographics ==
Historical population
Census	Pop.	Note	%±
1790	10,769		—
1800	12,946		20.2%
1810	13,540		4.6%
1820	14,737		8.8%
1830	14,127		−4.1%
1840	18,801		33.1%
1850	23,901		27.1%
1860	31,043		29.9%
1870	41,279		33.0%
1880	45,023		9.1%
1890	57,740		28.2%
1900	71,239		23.4%
1910	79,690		11.9%
1920	100,032		25.5%
1930	105,431		5.4%
1940	117,970		11.9%
1950	151,481		28.4%
1960	188,299		24.3%
1970	187,767		−0.3%
1980	202,226		7.7%
1990	216,935		7.3%
2000	232,048		7.0%
2010	265,128		14.3%
2020	295,291		11.4%
2025 (est.)	311,855	▲	5.6%
U.S. Decennial Census; 1790-1880 1890-1910; 1920-1930 1930-1940; 1940-1950 1960-1980; 1980-2000 2010 2020 2024

=== Racial and ethnic composition ===
Chatham County, Georgia – Racial and ethnic composition Note: the US Census treats Hispanic/Latino as an ethnic category. This table excludes Latinos from the racial categories and assigns them to a separate category. Hispanics/Latinos may be of any race.
Race / Ethnicity (NH = Non-Hispanic)	Pop 1980	Pop 1990	Pop 2000	Pop 2010	Pop 2020	% 1980	% 1990	% 2000	% 2010	% 2020
White alone (NH)	121,234	129,145	125,802	133,492	139,433	59.95%	59.53%	54.21%	50.35%	47.22%
Black or African American alone (NH)	76,648	82,179	93,463	105,274	108,011	37.90%	37.88%	40.28%	39.71%	36.58%
Native American or Alaska Native alone (NH)	237	437	517	587	619	0.12%	0.20%	0.22%	0.22%	0.21%
Asian alone (NH)	1,418	2,276	3,992	6,229	10,620	0.70%	1.05%	1.72%	2.35%	3.60%
Native Hawaiian or Pacific Islander alone (NH)	x	x	128	224	408	x	x	0.06%	0.08%	0.14%
Other race alone (NH)	413	116	311	476	1,447	0.20%	0.05%	0.13%	0.18%	0.49%
Mixed race or Multiracial (NH)	x	x	2,432	4,476	10,963	x	x	1.05%	1.69%	3.71%
Hispanic or Latino (any race)	2,276	2,782	5,403	14,370	23,790	1.13%	1.28%	2.33%	5.42%	8.06%
Total	202,226	216,935	232,048	265,128	295,291	100.00%	100.00%	100.00%	100.00%	100.00%

=== 2020 census ===
As of the 2020 census, the county had a population of 295,291. Of the residents, 20.5% were under the age of 18 and 16.1% were 65 years of age or older; the median age was 36.4 years. For every 100 females there were 91.4 males, and for every 100 females age 18 and over there were 88.5 males. 97.0% of residents lived in urban areas and 3.0% lived in rural areas.

The racial makeup of the county was 48.7% White, 37.0% Black or African American, 0.4% American Indian and Alaska Native, 3.6% Asian, 0.2% Native Hawaiian and Pacific Islander, 3.9% from some other race, and 6.2% from two or more races. Hispanic or Latino residents of any race made up 8.1% of the population.

There were 118,480 households in the county, of which 27.7% had children under the age of 18 living with them and 34.6% had a female householder with no spouse or partner present. About 30.6% of all households were made up of individuals and 10.8% had someone living alone who was 65 years of age or older.

There were 134,146 housing units, of which 11.7% were vacant. Among occupied housing units, 54.3% were owner-occupied and 45.7% were renter-occupied. The homeowner vacancy rate was 2.2% and the rental vacancy rate was 9.3%.

== Education ==
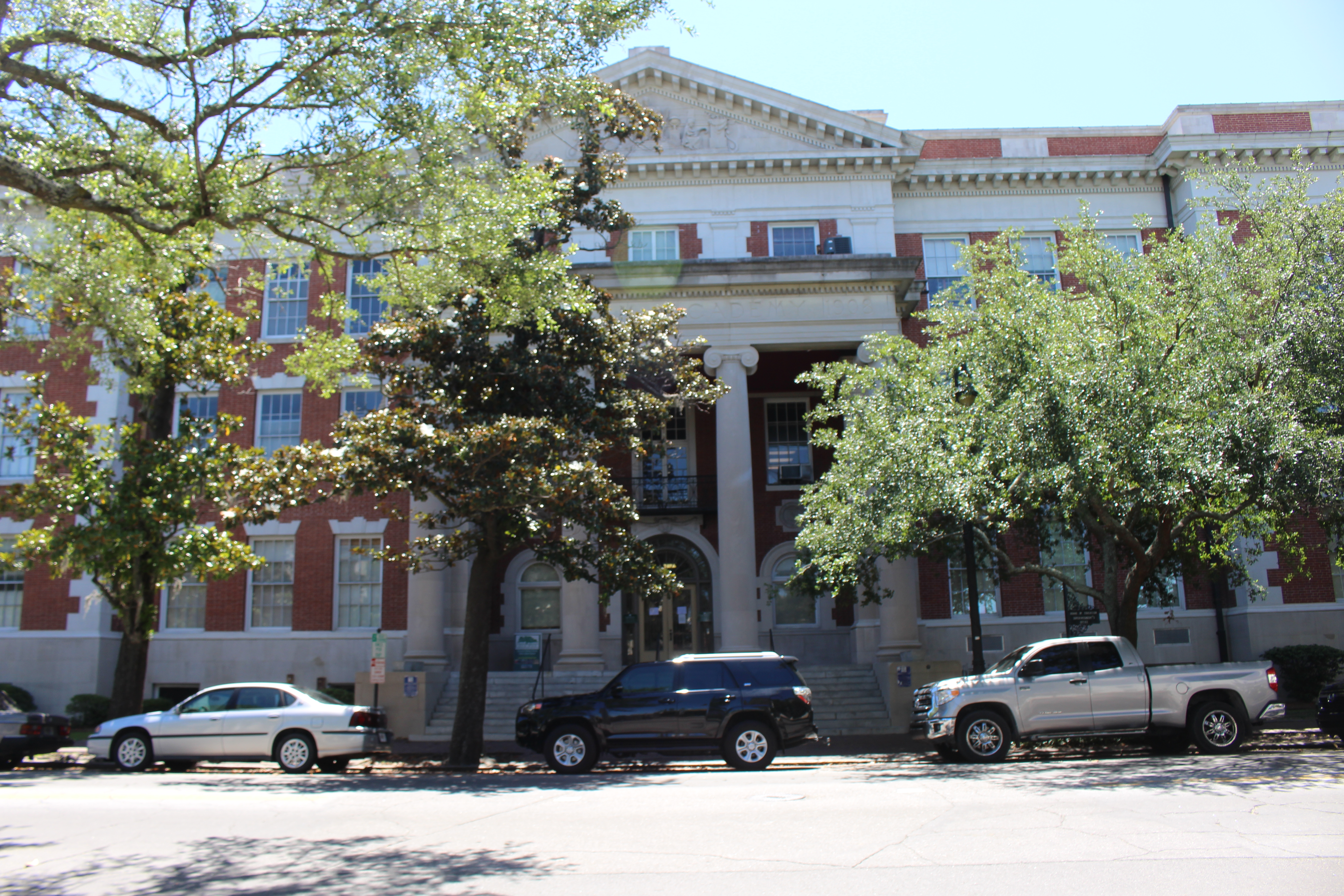
Savannah-Chatham County Public Schools headquarters

Public schools are operated by Savannah-Chatham County Public Schools. The entire county is in the district.

Savannah State University is partly in the Savannah city limits and partly in an unincorporated area.

Savannah College of Art and Design is in Savannah.

== Libraries ==
The Live Oak Public Libraries constitute a regional library system that provides services to three Georgia counties: Chatham, Effingham, and Liberty. The former name of the system, "Chatham Effingham Liberty Regional Library," described this collaboration. In 2002, the name was changed to Live Oak, which reflects the personality of the region, as well as the life and growth of its branches. At the beginning of the 20th century, city leaders in Savannah began to discuss the need for a public library. The history of libraries in Chatham County dates to 1903. According to Geraldine LeMay, former director of the Savannah Public Chatham-Effingham and Liberty Regional Library, the Georgia Historical Society and the city of Savannah worked out a plan that year to establish the Savannah Public Library. The idea was the brainchild of the Georgia Historical Society, which set up a planning committee to determine how the facilities of the society might best be useful to the city of Savannah. In a joint meeting of committee members from the society and the city of Savannah, a free public library was established that would prove to be of great value to the community. This library, however, did not serve citizens of color.

The parties agreed to allow free use of the society's books, provide physical space for the library, and annually contribute $500 in financial support for the library. In turn, the city would contribute $3,000 in annual support. The library opened in June 1903, but did not fully serve the public until November. By 1909, the Georgia Historical Society was no longer able to meet its financial commitment, leaving the city to provide full financial support. The library remained at Hodgson Hall, the space provided by the Georgia Historical Society, until 1915. From its early beginnings, the library offered special services to the community, including a department for children (although no one under the age of 14 was permitted to borrow books). The physical space at Hodgson Hall became too small to accommodate a large reference department, so the library established only a small collection of reference materials.. In 1916, the Savannah Public Library opened to doors to a new facility on Bull Street within the Savannah Victorian Historic District. The new facility was made possible by a grant from the Carnegie Corporation. As the library grew in popularity, it again found itself needing more space. The building was able to add additional space in 1936 thanks to a grant from the U.S. Works Progress Administration (WPA). With an ever-increasing population the library's board of directors decided to expand services beyond the Main Library. In 1916, two branch libraries were opened: the East Side Branch at Habersham and Congress Streets, and the Waters Avenue Branch. The services provided by these two branches were confined to children. To help further expand services, the Georgia Historical Society once again offered the library space at Hodgson Hall to be used as a branch library. This move was of mutual benefit to both the library and the Society. The library gained needed space for a downtown branch and the Society could organize and catalog materials. According to the history written by Lemay, some 5,027 volumes belonging to the Georgia Historical Society were cataloged by the library. This branch library continued operating until 1948, when it was sold to Armstrong Junior College (now Georgia Southern University-Armstrong Campus) to establish an academic library.

In 1924 a traveling book collection was instituted and placed in four public elementary schools; other schools were added when available materials and staff time allowed. In 1926, the Savannah Morning News donated space for a Downtown branch to primarily serve the business community. The Downtown branch experienced several changes in venues over the years until it was given a permanent home in the Gamble Building. The Gamble Building sits on Factors' Walk, on Bay Street next to Savannah's City Hall. With this move, the branch was renamed in honor of Ola Wyeth, the former president of the Georgia Library Association (1925).

In 1940 a bookmobile service was started to provide outreach to rural communities around Savannah. The Effingham County Library joined the Savannah Public Library in 1945 to form the Chatham–Effingham County Regional Library. In 1956, the library system was expanded to include Liberty County, resulting in the Chatham–Effingham–Liberty Regional Library (CEL).

When the United States Supreme Court declared de jure segregation illegal and unconstitutional, the library system experienced one of its greatest changes. As a result of this ruling, the "Library for the Colored Citizens of Savannah" was brought under the auspices of the Chatham-Effingham-Liberty Regional Library System (1963). This move made the library system a truly "free public library" serving all the citizens of Chatham, Effingham, and Liberty counties.

== Government and infrastructure ==
=== Board of Commissioners ===
Chatham County is governed by a Board of Commissioners, composed of one chairperson elected countywide and eight members elected by district. Democrats currently have a 6–3 majority.

Current composition of the Chatham County Board of Commissioners
District	Name	Affiliation	First elected
Chair	Chester Ellis	Democratic	2020
1	Wayne Noha	Republican	2024
2	Malinda Scott Hodge	Democratic	2023
3	Bobby Lockett	Democratic	2016
4	Brian Hussey	Republican	2026
5	Tanya Milton	Democratic	2020
6	Adot Whitely	Democratic	2020
7	Dean Kicklighter	Republican	2000
8	Marsha Buford	Democratic	2024

=== Policing ===
The Coastal State Prison, a Georgia Department of Corrections state prison, is located in Savannah, near Garden City.

Unincorporated Chatham County is primarily served by the Chatham County Police Department. (CCPD) and the Georgia State Patrol. The Chatham County Sheriff's Office is the enforcement arm of the county court system and operates the county jail. Except for the Town of Vernonburg, every incorporated town and city in Chatham County has its own police department.

== Politics ==
As of the 2020s, Chatham County is a Democratic Party stronghold, voting 58% for Kamala Harris in 2024. Chatham County was one of the earliest counties in Georgia to turn Republican and shake off its Solid South roots. From 1952 to 2000, the county voted for the Republican candidate for president all but four times. In 1968, Hubert Humphrey carried Chatham County by 95 votes over second-place Richard Nixon, and Chatham was one of only eight Georgia counties in which George Wallace came in as low as third place. Jimmy Carter won a majority in both of his runs for president, and in 1996, Bill Clinton became the first non-Georgian Democrat since Franklin D. Roosevelt to win a majority.

The county has voted Democratic in every presidential election since 2004, when John Kerry carried it by fewer than 150 votes and won a plurality. It would swing dramatically to support Barack Obama in 2008, making Obama only the second non-Georgian Democrat since Franklin Roosevelt to win a majority of the county's votes. Since then, Chatham has tended to vote substantially more for Democrats at the presidential level than the state as a whole. In the last four presidential elections, Democrats have recorded the biggest margins for non-Georgian Democrats since Roosevelt's landslides. This culminated in Joe Biden's winning 58.6% of the vote in the 2020 election, outdoing Jimmy Carter's 57% in 1976 for the best performance of a Democrat in the county since Franklin Roosevelt in 1944. Since 2008, Chatham has been one of the most reliably Democratic urban counties in the state outside the Atlanta area, and one of the few Democratic pockets in heavily Republican South Georgia.

For elections to the United States House of Representatives, Chatham County is part of Georgia's 1st congressional district, currently represented by Buddy Carter. For elections to the Georgia State Senate, Chatham County is divided between districts 1, 2 and 4. For elections to the Georgia House of Representatives, Chatham County is divided between districts 161, 162, 163, 164, 165 and 166.

United States presidential election results for Chatham County, Georgia
Year	Republican		Democratic		Third party(ies)	
Year	No.	%	No.	%	No.	%
1880	2,160	38.82%	3,404	61.18%	0	0.00%
1884	1,747	35.72%	3,144	64.28%	0	0.00%
1888	1,355	25.41%	3,920	73.52%	57	1.07%
1892	1,359	20.35%	5,264	78.83%	55	0.82%
1896	1,697	35.64%	2,506	52.64%	558	11.72%
1900	916	21.43%	3,352	78.41%	7	0.16%
1904	363	12.01%	2,645	87.52%	14	0.46%
1908	1,209	26.54%	3,305	72.54%	42	0.92%
1912	238	5.37%	3,864	87.14%	332	7.49%
1916	368	7.70%	3,797	79.42%	616	12.88%
1920	995	19.00%	4,243	81.00%	0	0.00%
1924	1,800	20.42%	6,158	69.86%	857	9.72%
1928	5,288	48.86%	5,534	51.14%	0	0.00%
1932	1,669	17.13%	8,020	82.31%	55	0.56%
1936	1,227	10.89%	10,019	88.90%	24	0.21%
1940	1,985	16.47%	10,048	83.37%	19	0.16%
1944	2,058	19.09%	8,725	80.91%	0	0.00%
1948	5,966	24.97%	10,864	45.46%	7,067	29.57%
1952	15,532	51.94%	14,370	48.06%	0	0.00%
1956	14,520	62.54%	8,698	37.46%	0	0.00%
1960	17,935	52.48%	16,240	47.52%	0	0.00%
1964	33,141	58.85%	23,176	41.15%	1	0.00%
1968	18,106	33.81%	18,201	33.99%	17,238	32.19%
1972	38,079	70.98%	15,566	29.02%	0	0.00%
1976	24,160	42.96%	32,075	57.04%	0	0.00%
1980	26,499	46.67%	28,413	50.04%	1,869	3.29%
1984	38,482	57.65%	28,271	42.35%	0	0.00%
1988	35,623	58.12%	25,063	40.89%	603	0.98%
1992	31,925	44.30%	31,533	43.75%	8,611	11.95%
1996	31,987	44.88%	35,781	50.20%	3,509	4.92%
2000	37,847	49.49%	37,590	49.15%	1,038	1.36%
2004	45,484	49.62%	45,630	49.78%	557	0.61%
2008	46,829	42.40%	62,755	56.82%	858	0.78%
2012	47,204	43.38%	60,246	55.36%	1,371	1.26%
2016	45,688	40.41%	62,290	55.10%	5,073	4.49%
2020	53,232	39.88%	78,247	58.62%	2,005	1.50%
2024	57,336	40.63%	82,758	58.65%	1,015	0.72%

United States Senate election results for Chatham County, Georgia2
Year	Republican		Democratic		Third party(ies)	
Year	No.	%	No.	%	No.	%
2020	52,988	40.19%	75,873	57.55%	2,986	2.26%
2020	48,937	40.36%	72,309	59.64%	0	0.00%

United States Senate election results for Chatham County, Georgia3
Year	Republican		Democratic		Third party(ies)	
Year	No.	%	No.	%	No.	%
2020	30,435	23.17%	54,637	41.59%	46,297	35.24%
2020	48,707	40.17%	72,550	59.83%	0	0.00%
2022	41,189	38.86%	62,996	59.43%	1,816	1.71%
2022	36,754	38.08%	59,759	61.92%	0	0.00%

Georgia Gubernatorial election results for Chatham County
Year	Republican		Democratic		Third party(ies)	
Year	No.	%	No.	%	No.	%
2022	46,593	43.82%	58,978	55.47%	758	0.71%

== See also ==
- Georgia Senate, District 2
- National Register of Historic Places listings in Chatham County, Georgia
- List of counties in Georgia
