= Port Wentworth, Georgia =

- City
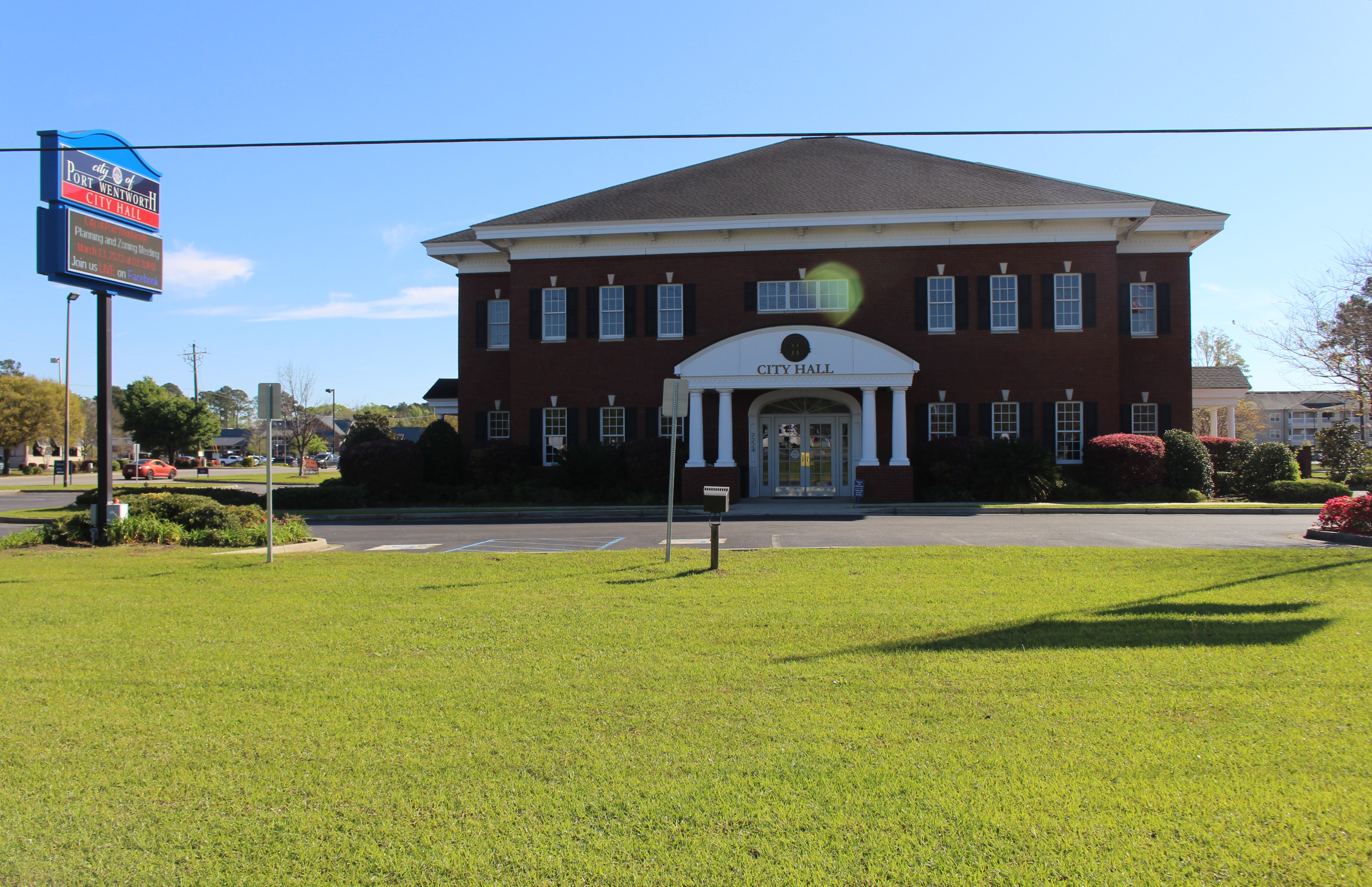
- Port Wentworth City Hall

- Logo

- Location in Chatham County and the state of Georgia
- Coordinates: 32°9′52″N 81°10′48″W
- Country: United States
- State: Georgia
- County: Chatham

Government
  - Type: Council-City Manager Government
  - Mayor: Tracy Consani Saunders
  - City Council: Gabrielle Nelson; Mark Stephens; Rufus Bright; Nishant Randerwala; Thomas Barbee; Artlise Alston-Cone
  - City Manager: Steve Davis
  - Assistant City Manager: Thomas Kilmartin
  - Deputy City Manager: David Stahl

Area
  - Total: 16.12 sq mi (41.74 km^{2})
  - Land: 16.07 sq mi (41.62 km^{2})
  - Water: 0.046 sq mi (0.12 km^{2})
- Elevation: 23 ft (7.0 m)

Population (2020)
  - Total: 10,878
  - Density: 676.9/sq mi (261.34/km^{2})
- Time zone: UTC-5 (Eastern (EST))
  - Summer (DST): UTC-4 (EDT)
- ZIP code: 31407
- Area code: 912
- FIPS code: 13-62328
- GNIS feature ID: 0332733
- Website: portwentworthga.gov

Port Wentworth is a city in Chatham County, Georgia, United States. The 2020 population was 10,878, more than double the population of 5,359 at the 2010 census. Port Wentworth is part of the Savannah metropolitan area.

== History ==
The Georgia General Assembly incorporated Port Wentworth in 1957.

=== Dixie Crystals plant explosion ===
On February 7, 2008, an explosion at the historic Dixie Crystals sugar plant, established in 1916 on Oxnard Drive, killed 14 people and injured at least 40 others. The victims ranged in age from 18 to 56. The blast could be heard as far away as Levy, South Carolina, where it shook house walls. The accident brought Port Wentworth national and international notice; it was widely reported in European and Asian media.

== Geography ==
Port Wentworth is located in the northern corner of Chatham County at 32°09′52″N 81°10′48″W. It is bordered by Effingham County to the north, by Garden City to the southeast, and by the Savannah city limits (surrounding Savannah/Hilton Head International Airport) to the southwest. Within the Port Wentworth city limits are the localities of Meinhard and Monteith.

According to the United States Census Bureau, the city has a total area of 16.6 sq mi (43.0 km^{2}), of which 0.15 square miles (0.4 km^{2}), or 0.91%, is covered by water.

== Demographics ==
Historical population
Census	Pop.	Note	%±
1960	3,705		—
1970	3,905		5.4%
1980	3,947		1.1%
1990	4,012		1.6%
2000	3,276		−18.3%
2010	5,359		63.6%
2020	10,878		103.0%
2025 (est.)	17,604	▲	61.8%
U.S. Decennial Census; 2025

=== 2020 census ===
As of the 2020 census, Port Wentworth had a population of 10,878. The median age was 32.1 years. 27.3% of residents were under the age of 18 and 8.7% of residents were 65 years of age or older. For every 100 females there were 93.7 males, and for every 100 females age 18 and over there were 88.7 males age 18 and over.

94.7% of residents lived in urban areas, while 5.3% lived in rural areas.

There were 4,055 households in Port Wentworth, including 2,091 families. Of all households, 40.1% had children under the age of 18 living in them, 41.2% were married-couple households, 19.0% were households with a male householder and no spouse or partner present, and 30.2% were households with a female householder and no spouse or partner present. About 24.5% of all households were made up of individuals and 5.3% had someone living alone who was 65 years of age or older.

There were 4,424 housing units, of which 8.3% were vacant. The homeowner vacancy rate was 2.5% and the rental vacancy rate was 10.1%.

Port Wentworth racial composition as of 2020
Race	Num.	Perc.
White (non-Hispanic)	3,981	36.60%
Black or African American (non-Hispanic)	5,061	46.53%
Native American	32	0.29%
Asian	131	1.20%
Pacific Islander	7	0.06%
Other/Mixed	561	5.16%
Hispanic or Latino	1,105	10.16%

== Education ==
Port Wentworth is part of the Savannah-Chatham County Public Schools.

== Notable people ==
- Buddy Carter (born 1957) – U.S. representative for Georgia

== Gallery ==
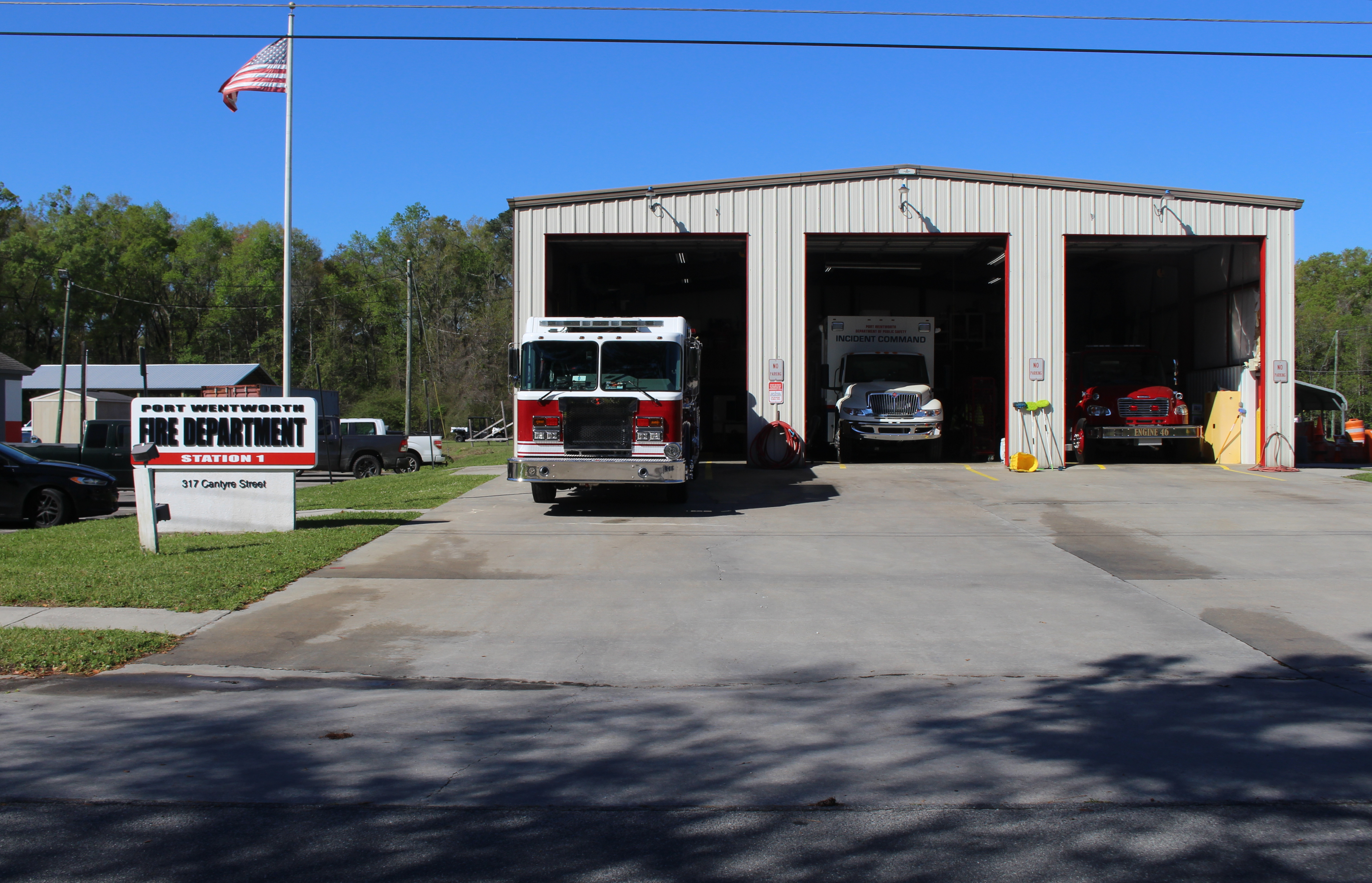
Fire Department Station 1

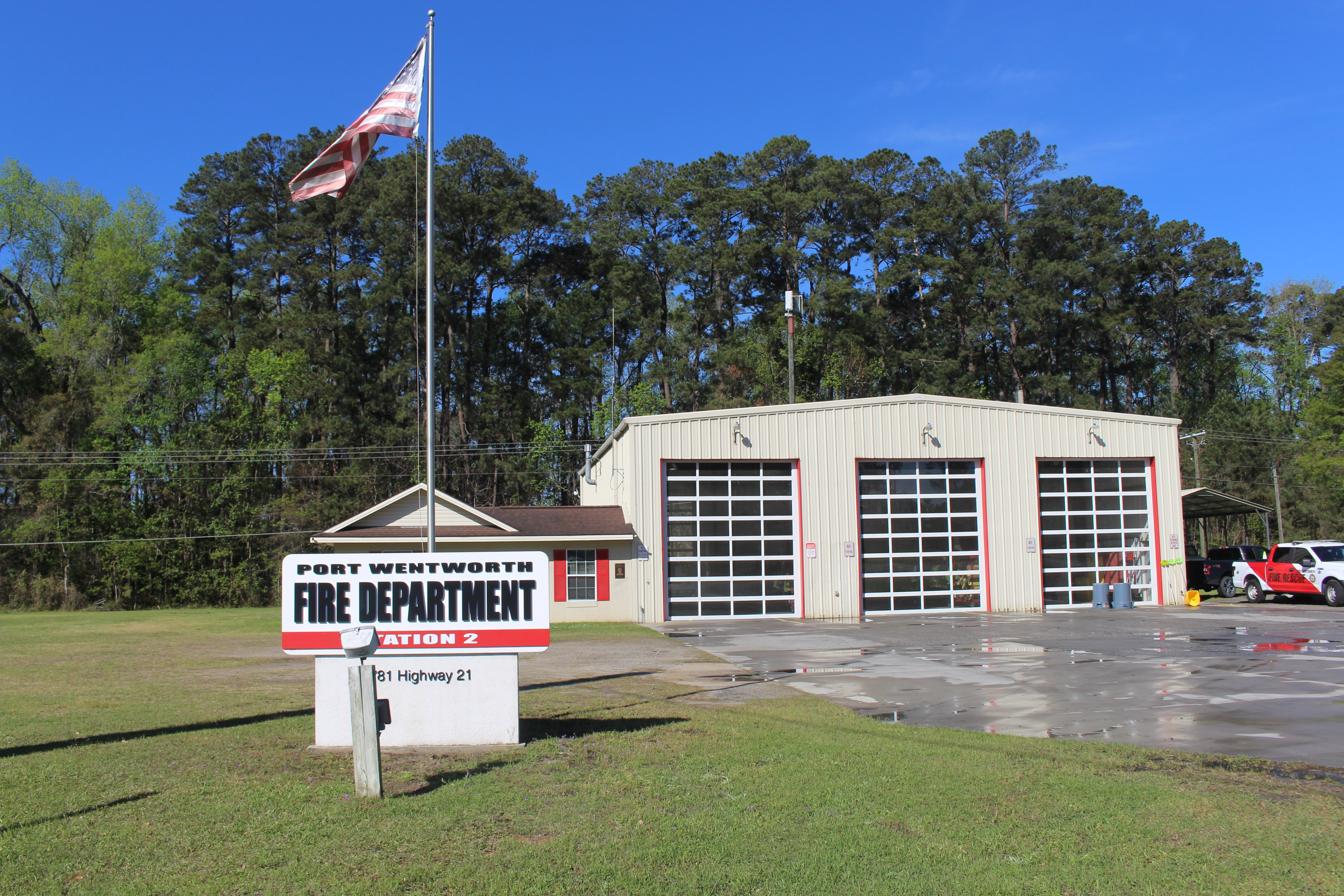
Fire Department Station 2

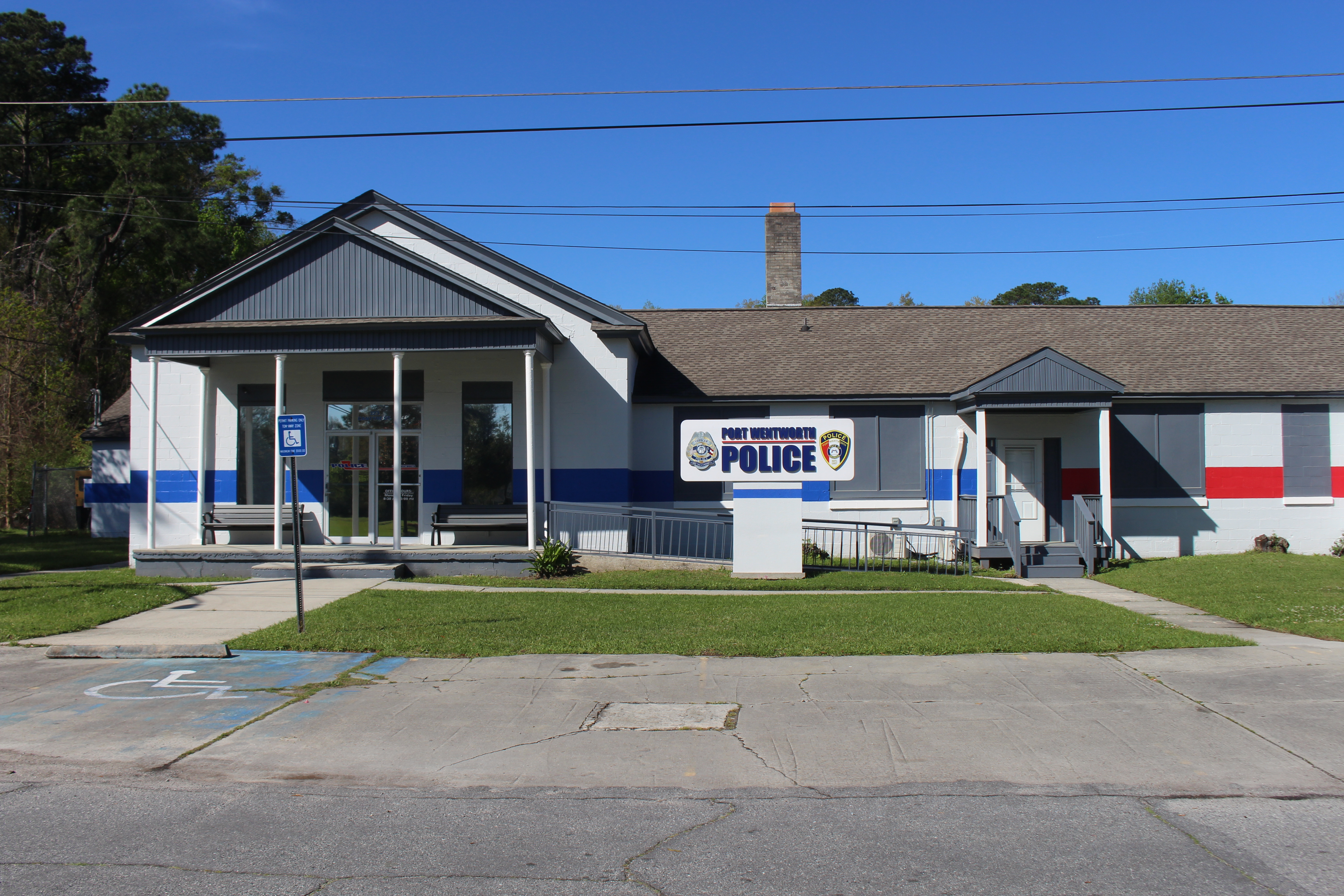
Port Wentworth Police Station
