= Abercorn (disambiguation) =

Abercorn is a village in Scotland (UK).

Abercorn may also refer to:

== Places ==
=== Africa ===
- Mbala, Zambia, a town in Zambia (then Northern Rhodesia) formerly known as Abercorn
  - The former Roman Catholic Diocese of Abercorn (Northern Rhodesia), originally an apostolic vicariate, now the Zambian diocese of Mpika
- Shamva, a village in Zimbabwe (then (Southern) Rhodesia) formerly known as Abercorn

=== Australia ===
- Abercorn, Queensland, a town and locality in the North Burnett Region

=== Europe ===
- Abercorn, a bar and restaurant in Belfast where the Abercorn Restaurant bombing occurred
- Abercorn Place, a street in St John's Wood, London
- Abercorn Place, a tram stop in Blackpool (England)
- Abercorn Primary School, a school in Banbridge, Northern Ireland (UK)
- Abercorn School, a school in London

=== North America ===
- Abercorn Common, a shopping centre in Savannah, US
- Abercorn, Quebec, a village in Canada

== Other uses ==
- The former Roman Catholic Diocese of Abercorn (Scotland), now a Catholic titular see
- Abercorn F.C., a football club in Scotland
- Duke of Abercorn, a title in the peerage of Scotland
