= Hill Hall =

Hill Hall may refer to:

in England

- Hill Hall (Essex) restored Elizabethan mansion near Epping
- Headington Hill Hall in Oxford

in the United States

- Hill Hall (Savannah State College) in Savannah, Georgia
- Hill Hall (Missouri) on the University of Missouri campus in Columbia, Missouri
