= Savannah, Georgia =

City in Georgia, United States

Savannah
- City
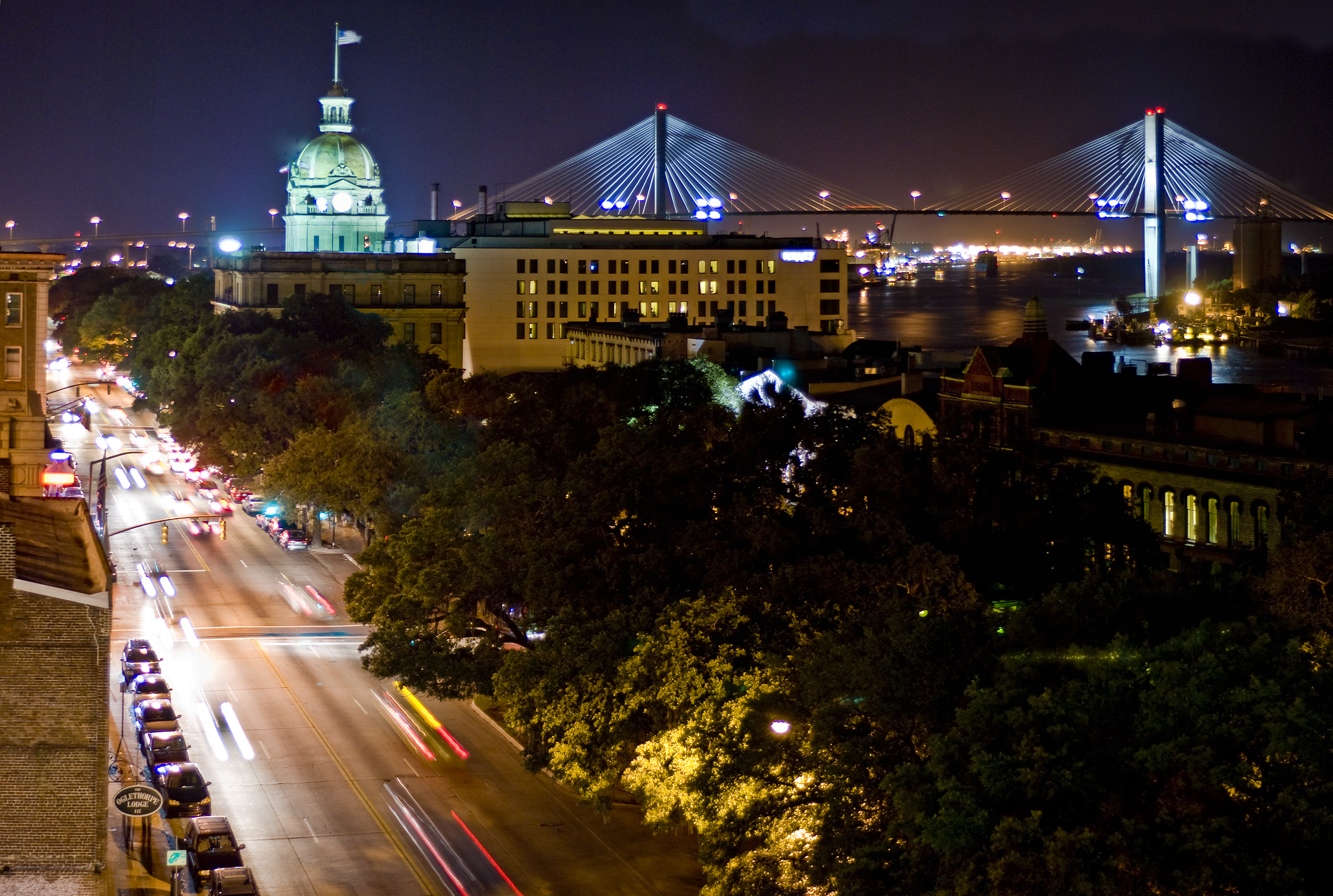
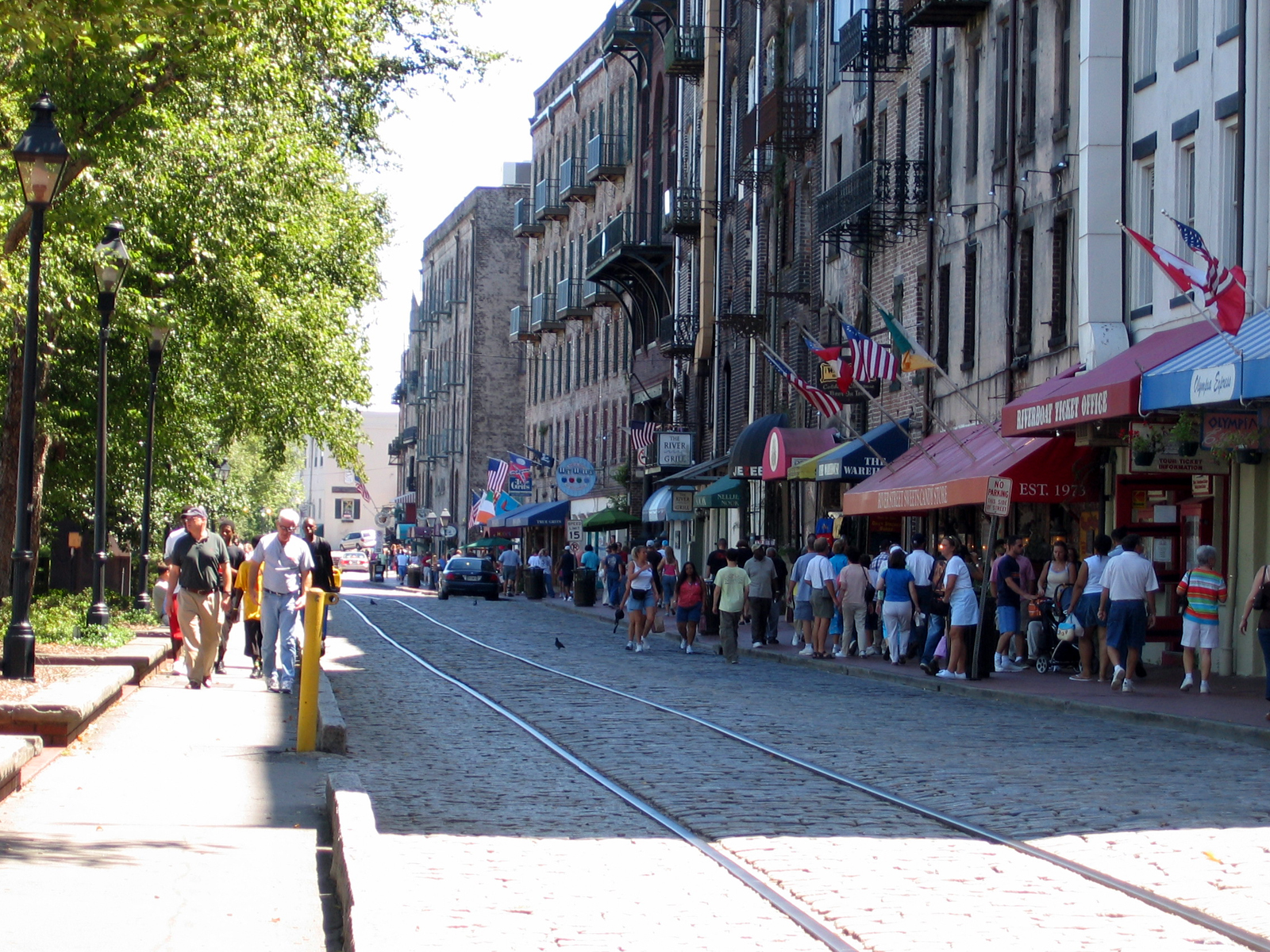
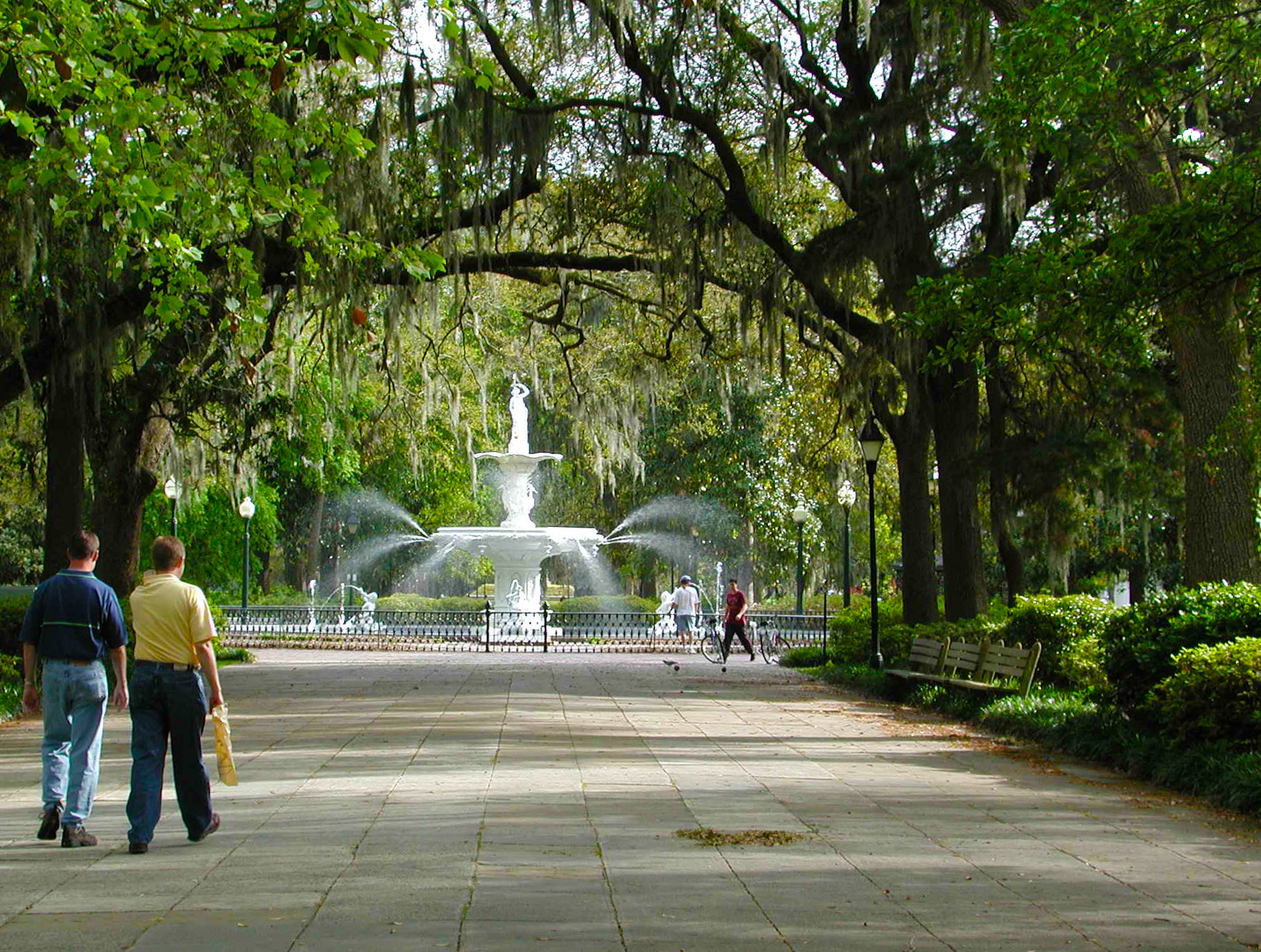
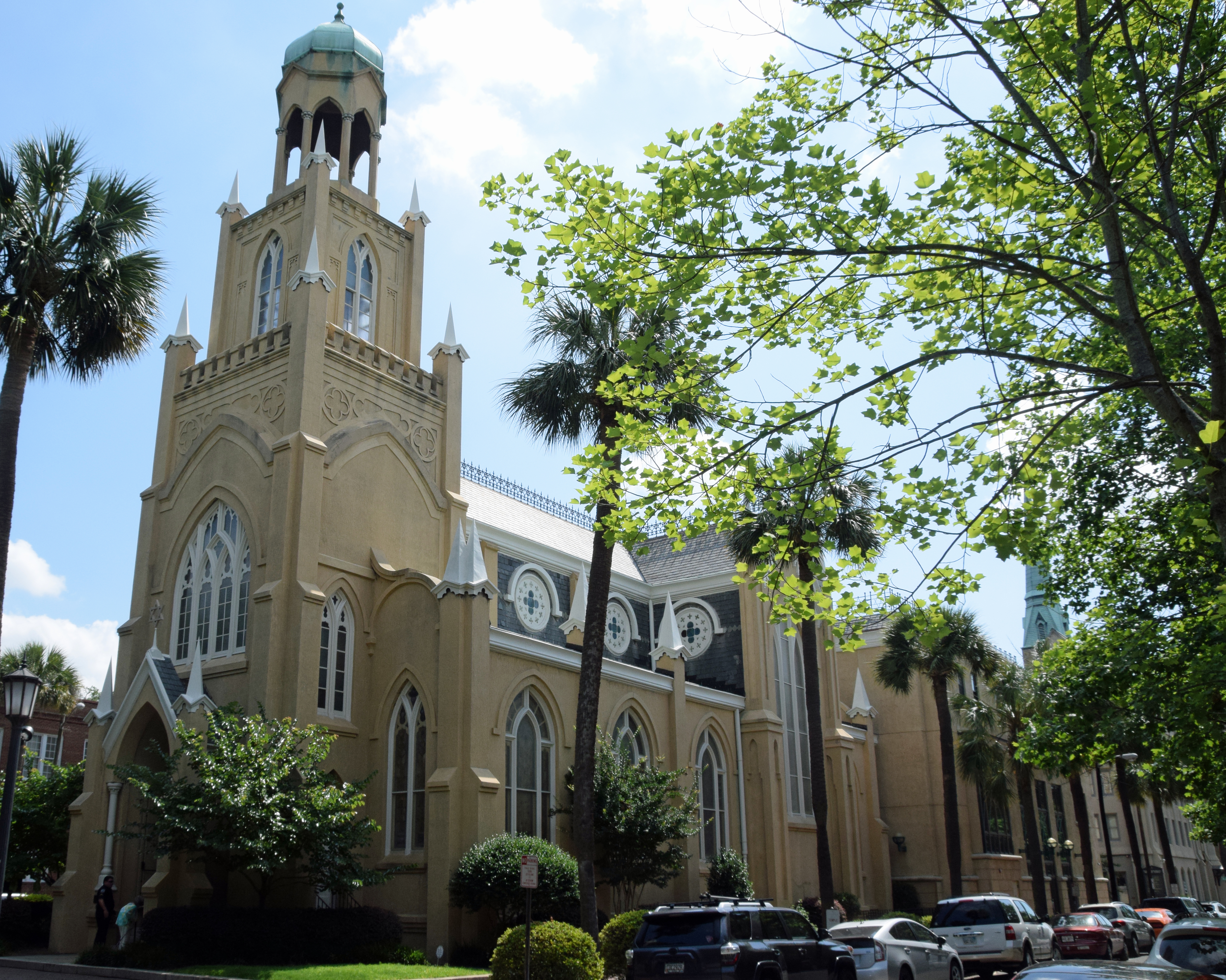
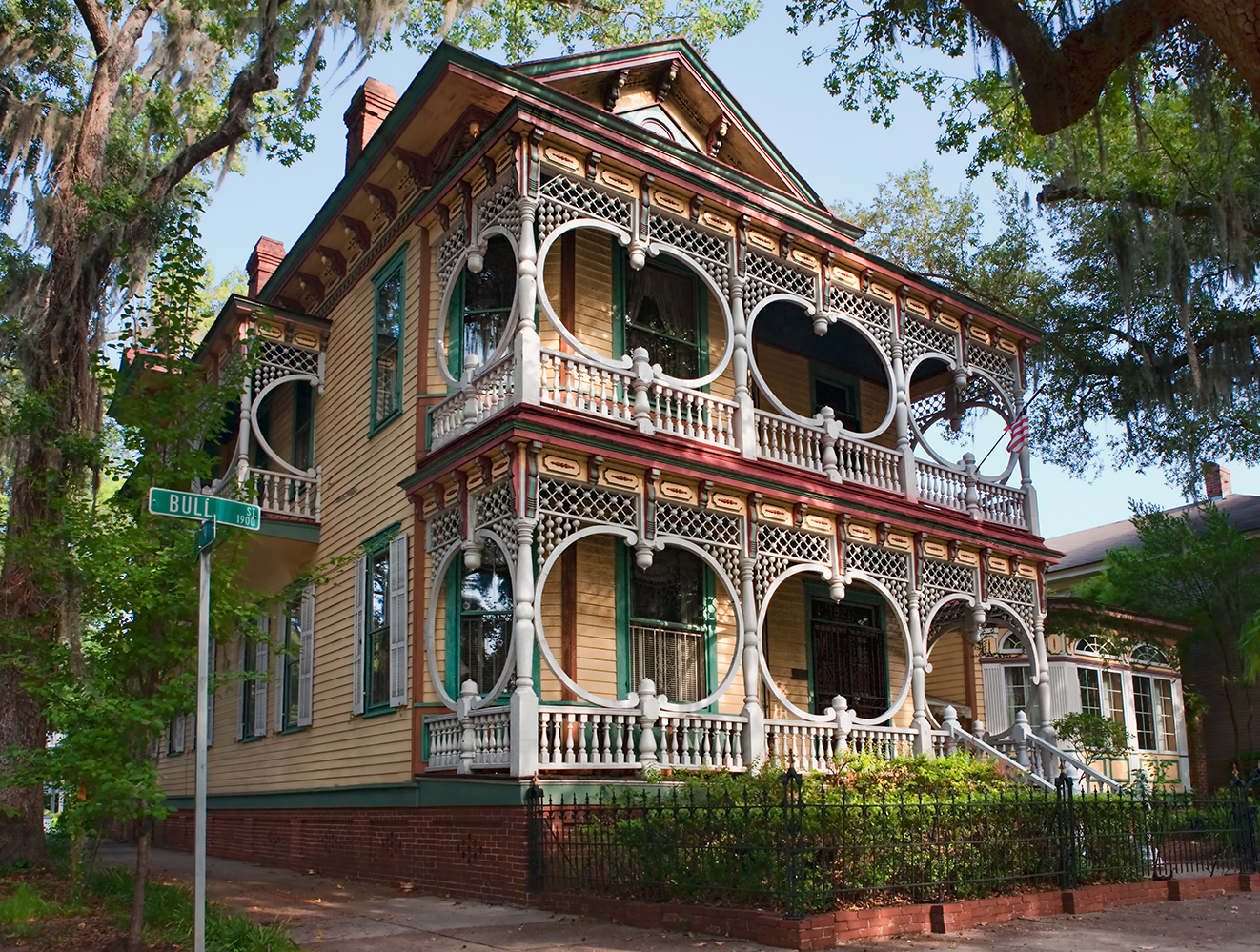
- Downtown Savannah viewed from Bay Street River Street Forsyth Park Congregation Mickve Israel The Gingerbread House in Victorian Historic District

- Flag Seal Logo
- Nickname: "The Hostess City of the South"
- Interactive map of Savannah
- Location within Georgia Location within the United States
- Coordinates: 32°04′52″N 81°05′28″W
- Country: United States
- State: Georgia
- County: Chatham
- Established: February 12, 1733 (293 years ago)
- Founder: James Oglethorpe
- Named for: Savannah River

Government
  - Mayor: Van R. Johnson (D)
  - City Manager: Joseph Melder

Area
  - City: 113.27 sq mi (293.36 km^{2})
  - Land: 108.50 sq mi (281.01 km^{2})
  - Water: 4.77 sq mi (12.35 km^{2})
- Elevation: 20 ft (6.1 m)

Population (2020)
  - City: 147,780
  - Estimate (2025): 149,440 ▲
  - Rank: 185th in the United States; 5th in Georgia
  - Density: 1,300/sq mi (500/km^{2})
  - Urban: 309,466 (U.S.: 132nd)
  - Urban density: 1,503/sq mi (580.5/km^{2})
  - Metro: 438,314 (U.S.: 126th)
- Demonym: Savannahian
- Time zone: UTC−5 (EST)
  - Summer (DST): UTC−4 (EDT)
- ZIP Codes: 31401–31412, 31414-31416, 31418-31421
- Area codes: 912, 565
- FIPS code: 13-69000
- GNIS feature ID: 0322590
- Website: savannahga.gov

Savannah (Note: /səˈvænə/, sə-VAN-ə) is a city in and the county seat of Chatham County, Georgia, United States. Established in 1733 on the Savannah River, it is the oldest city in the state, and was the capital of the colonial Province of Georgia and later the first state capital of Georgia. A strategic port city in the American Revolution and during the American Civil War, Savannah today is an industrial center and an important Atlantic seaport. The city is the most populous in the Coastal Georgia region and the fifth-most populous in the state as a whole, with a population of 147,780 at the 2020 census and an estimated 149,440 in 2025. The Savannah metropolitan area, with about 438,000 residents in 2025, is the third-largest metro area in the state.

Savannah attracts millions of visitors each year to its cobblestone streets, parks, and notable historic buildings. These include the birthplace of Juliette Gordon Low (founder of the Girl Scouts of the USA), the Georgia Historical Society (the oldest continually operating historical society in the South), the Telfair Academy of Arts and Sciences (one of the South's first public museums), the First African Baptist Church (one of the oldest African-American Baptist congregations in the United States), Temple Mickve Israel (the third-oldest synagogue in the U.S.), and the Central of Georgia Railway roundhouse complex (the oldest standing antebellum rail facility in the U.S., now a museum and visitor center).

Savannah's downtown area, which includes the Savannah Historic District, its 22 parklike squares, and the Savannah Victorian Historic District, is one of the largest National Historic Landmark Districts in the U.S., designated by the federal government in 1966. Downtown Savannah largely retains the founder James Oglethorpe's original town plan, a design known as the Oglethorpe Plan.

During the 1996 Summer Olympics hosted by Atlanta, Savannah held sailing competitions in the nearby Wassaw Sound.

== History ==
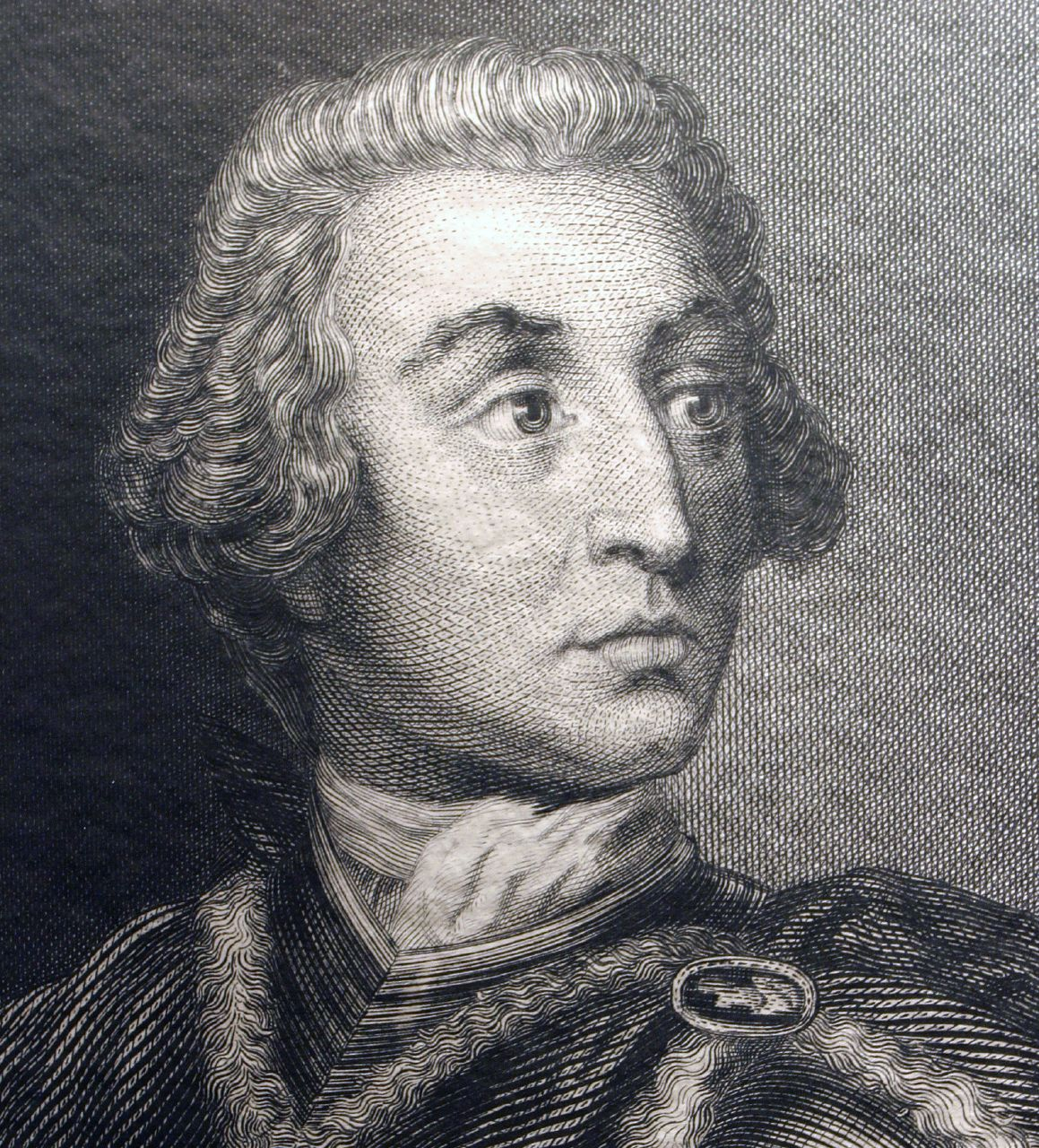
General James Edward Oglethorpe, sent by King George II to create a buffer south of the Savannah River to protect the British Carolinas from Spanish Florida and French Louisiana

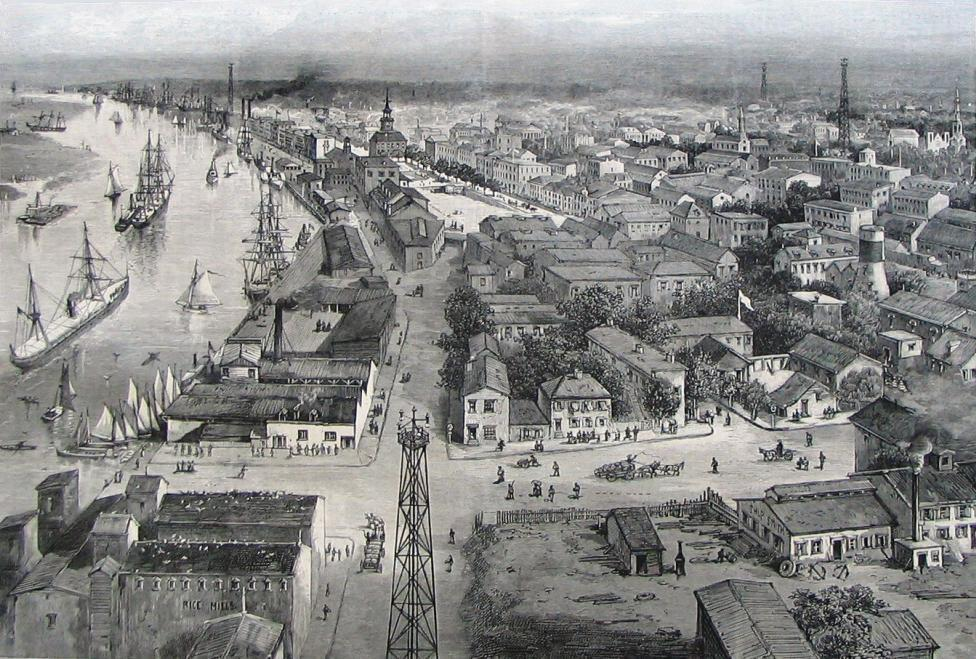
Savannah in the late 19th century

On February 12, 1733, (Note: O.S. February 1, 1732, according to the Julian calendar used in the British colonies until September 2, 1752. With the adoption of the Gregorian calendar, eleven days in the date were omitted, and the modern New Year (January 1) replaced the Julian contemporary New Year (March 25), previously observed in England and Wales.) British general James Oglethorpe and 113 settlers from the ship Anne landed at Yamacraw Bluff and were greeted by Tomochichi, the Yamacraws, and Indian traders John and Mary Musgrove. Mary Musgrove often served as an interpreter. The city of Savannah and the colony of Georgia were founded on that date. In 1751, Savannah and the rest of Georgia became a Royal Colony, with Savannah as its capital.

By the outbreak of the American Revolutionary War, Savannah had become the southernmost commercial port in the Thirteen Colonies. British troops took the city in 1778, and the following year, a combined force of American and French soldiers, including Haitians, failed to rout the British at the Siege of Savannah. The British did not leave the city until July 1782. In December 1804 the state legislature declared Milledgeville the new capital of Georgia.

Savannah, a prosperous seaport and market town throughout the nineteenth century, was the Confederacy's sixth most populous city and the prime objective of Major General William T. Sherman's March to the Sea. During the night of December 20–21, 1864, local authorities negotiated a peaceful surrender to save Savannah from destruction, and Union troops marched into the city at dawn.

Savannah was named after the Savannah River, which probably derives from variant names for the Shawnee, a Native American people who migrated to the river in the 1680s. The Shawnee destroyed another Native people, the Westo, and occupied their lands at the head of the Savannah River's navigation on the fall line, near present-day Augusta, Georgia. These Shawnee, whose Native name was Ša·wano·ki (literally, "southerners"), were known by several local variants, including Shawano, Savano, Savana and Savannah. Another theory is that the name Savannah refers to the extensive marshlands surrounding the river for miles inland, and is derived from the English term "savanna", a kind of tropical grassland, which was borrowed by the English from Spanish sabana and used in the Southern Colonies. (The Spanish word comes from the Taino word zabana.) Still other theories suggest that the name Savannah originates from Algonquian terms meaning not only "southerners" but perhaps also "salt", while one points to its origin in the Algonquian word savanne, meaning "muddy water" or "drowned prairie".

== Geography ==
Savannah lies on the Savannah River, approximately 20 mi (32 km) upriver from the Atlantic Ocean. According to the United States Census Bureau (2011), the city has a total area of 108.7 square miles (281.5 km^{2}), of which 103.1 square miles (267.0 km^{2}) is land and 5.6 square miles (15 km^{2}) is water (5.15%). Savannah is the primary port on the Savannah River and the largest port in Georgia. It is also near the U.S. Intracoastal Waterway. Georgia's Ogeechee River flows toward the Atlantic Ocean some 16 miles (26 km) south of downtown Savannah and forms the southern city limit.

Savannah is prone to flooding due to abundant rainfall, an elevation just above sea level, and the shape of the coastline, which poses a greater surge risk during hurricanes. The city currently uses five canals. In addition, several pumping stations have been built to help reduce the effects of flash flooding.

=== Climate ===
Savannah's climate is classified as humid subtropical (Köppen Cfa). Throughout the Deep South, this is characterized by long and almost tropical summers and short, mild winters. Savannah records only a few days of freezing temperatures each year, and snowfall is rare. Due to its proximity to the Atlantic coast, Savannah rarely experiences temperatures as extreme as those in Georgia's interior. Nevertheless, the extreme temperatures have officially ranged from 105 °F (41 °C), on July 20, 1986, and July 12, 1879, down to 3 °F (−16 °C) during the January 1985 Arctic outbreak.

Seasonally, Savannah tends to have hot and humid summers with frequent (but brief) thunderstorms that develop in the warm and tropical air masses, which are common. Although summers in Savannah are frequently sunny, half of Savannah's annual precipitation falls from June through September. Average dewpoints in summer range from 67.8 to 71.6 °F (20 to 22 °C). Winters in Savannah are mild and sunny with average daily high temperatures of 61.4 °F (16 °C) in January. November and December are the driest months recorded at Savannah–Hilton Head International Airport. Each year, Savannah reports 21 days on average with low temperatures below freezing, though in some years, fewer than 10 nights will fall below freezing, and the city has even gone an entire winter season (1879–80) without recording a freeze. Although decades might pass between snowfall events, Savannah has experienced snow on rare occasions, most notably in December 1989, when up to 3.9 inches (9.9 cm) was recorded in one day in parts of the city.

Savannah is at risk for hurricanes, particularly of the Cape Verde type of storms that take place during the peak of the season. Because of its location in the Georgia Bight (the arc of the Atlantic coastline in Georgia and northern Florida) as well as the tendency for hurricanes to re-curve up the coast, Savannah has a lower risk of hurricanes than some other coastal cities such as Charleston, South Carolina. Savannah was seldom affected by hurricanes during the 20th century. Hurricane David, in August 1979, is a notable exception. However, the historical record shows that the city was frequently affected during the second half of the 19th century. The most prominent of these storms was the 1893 Sea Islands hurricane, which killed at least 2,000 people. (This estimate may be low, as deaths among the many impoverished rural African Americans living on Georgia's barrier islands may not have been reported.)

Savannah was most recently affected by an active 2016 hurricane season, including Hurricane Matthew (which made a partial eyewall landfall), and was brushed by Hurricane Irma in 2017. The 2024 season saw impacts from Hurricane Debby and Hurricane Helene.

Climate data for Savannah, Georgia (Savannah/Hilton Head Int'l), 1991–2020 normals, (Note: Mean monthly maxima and minima (i.e. the expected highest and lowest temperature readings at any point during the year or given month) calculated based on data at said location from 1991 to 2020.) extremes 1871–present (Note: Official records for Savannah were kept at downtown from January 1871 to April 1945, Hunter Field from May 1945 to September 1950, and at Savannah/Hilton Head Int'l since October 1950. For more information, see ThreadEx.)
Month	Jan	Feb	Mar	Apr	May	Jun	Jul	Aug	Sep	Oct	Nov	Dec	Year
Record high °F (°C)	84 (29)	87 (31)	94 (34)	95 (35)	102 (39)	104 (40)	105 (41)	104 (40)	102 (39)	97 (36)	89 (32)	83 (28)	105 (41)
Mean maximum °F (°C)	77.5 (25.3)	80.9 (27.2)	84.9 (29.4)	89.1 (31.7)	94.0 (34.4)	97.5 (36.4)	98.8 (37.1)	97.6 (36.4)	94.0 (34.4)	88.6 (31.4)	83.3 (28.5)	78.2 (25.7)	99.7 (37.6)
Mean daily maximum °F (°C)	61.4 (16.3)	65.1 (18.4)	71.4 (21.9)	78.2 (25.7)	84.7 (29.3)	89.6 (32.0)	92.3 (33.5)	90.8 (32.7)	86.4 (30.2)	79.0 (26.1)	70.2 (21.2)	63.7 (17.6)	77.7 (25.4)
Daily mean °F (°C)	50.7 (10.4)	54.0 (12.2)	60.0 (15.6)	66.7 (19.3)	74.1 (23.4)	80.1 (26.7)	83.0 (28.3)	82.1 (27.8)	77.7 (25.4)	68.8 (20.4)	59.1 (15.1)	53.2 (11.8)	67.5 (19.7)
Mean daily minimum °F (°C)	40.0 (4.4)	42.9 (6.1)	48.6 (9.2)	55.2 (12.9)	63.4 (17.4)	70.7 (21.5)	73.7 (23.2)	73.3 (22.9)	69.0 (20.6)	58.6 (14.8)	48.0 (8.9)	42.6 (5.9)	57.2 (14.0)
Mean minimum °F (°C)	23.3 (−4.8)	26.5 (−3.1)	31.2 (−0.4)	39.4 (4.1)	49.8 (9.9)	62.7 (17.1)	68.6 (20.3)	67.2 (19.6)	57.1 (13.9)	42.1 (5.6)	31.4 (−0.3)	26.9 (−2.8)	21.6 (−5.8)
Record low °F (°C)	3 (−16)	8 (−13)	20 (−7)	28 (−2)	39 (4)	49 (9)	61 (16)	57 (14)	43 (6)	28 (−2)	15 (−9)	9 (−13)	3 (−16)
Average precipitation inches (mm)	3.28 (83)	2.80 (71)	3.50 (89)	3.39 (86)	3.62 (92)	6.65 (169)	5.75 (146)	5.46 (139)	4.35 (110)	3.72 (94)	2.39 (61)	3.21 (82)	48.12 (1,222)
Average precipitation days (≥ 0.01 in)	8.5	7.8	7.9	6.7	7.3	12.3	12.4	12.8	9.9	6.8	6.8	8.4	107.6
Average relative humidity (%)	69.6	67.0	66.8	65.4	70.1	73.6	76.0	78.6	77.7	72.9	72.3	70.8	71.7
Average dew point °F (°C)	37.0 (2.8)	38.8 (3.8)	45.7 (7.6)	51.6 (10.9)	60.8 (16.0)	67.8 (19.9)	71.2 (21.8)	71.6 (22.0)	67.5 (19.7)	56.5 (13.6)	48.0 (8.9)	40.5 (4.7)	54.8 (12.6)
Mean monthly sunshine hours	175.5	181.0	232.0	275.6	288.9	276.0	271.3	245.8	214.3	228.6	193.5	174.2	2,756.7
Percentage possible sunshine	55	59	62	71	67	65	62	60	58	65	61	56	62
Source: NOAA (relative humidity, dew point and sun 1961–1990)

The first meteorological observations in Savannah probably occurred at Oglethorpe Barracks circa 1827, continuing intermittently until 1850 and resuming in 1866. The Signal Service began observations in 1874, and the National Weather Service has kept records of most data continually since then; since 1948, Savannah-Hilton Head International Airport has served as Savannah's official meteorological station. Annual records (dating back to 1950) from the airport's weather station are available on the web.

=== Cityscape ===
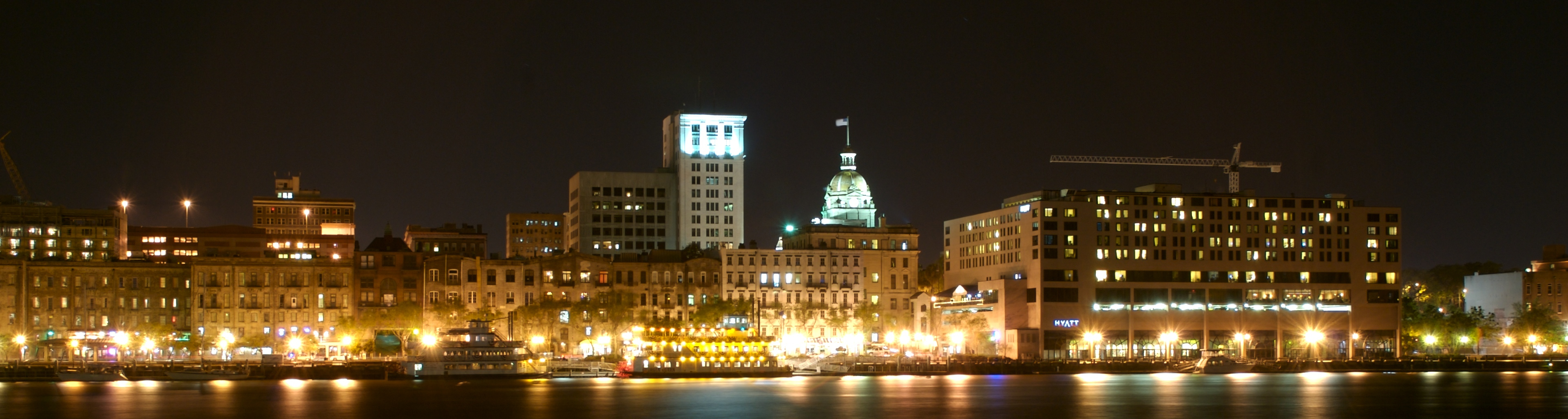
Panorama of the River Street district at night

==== Neighborhoods ====
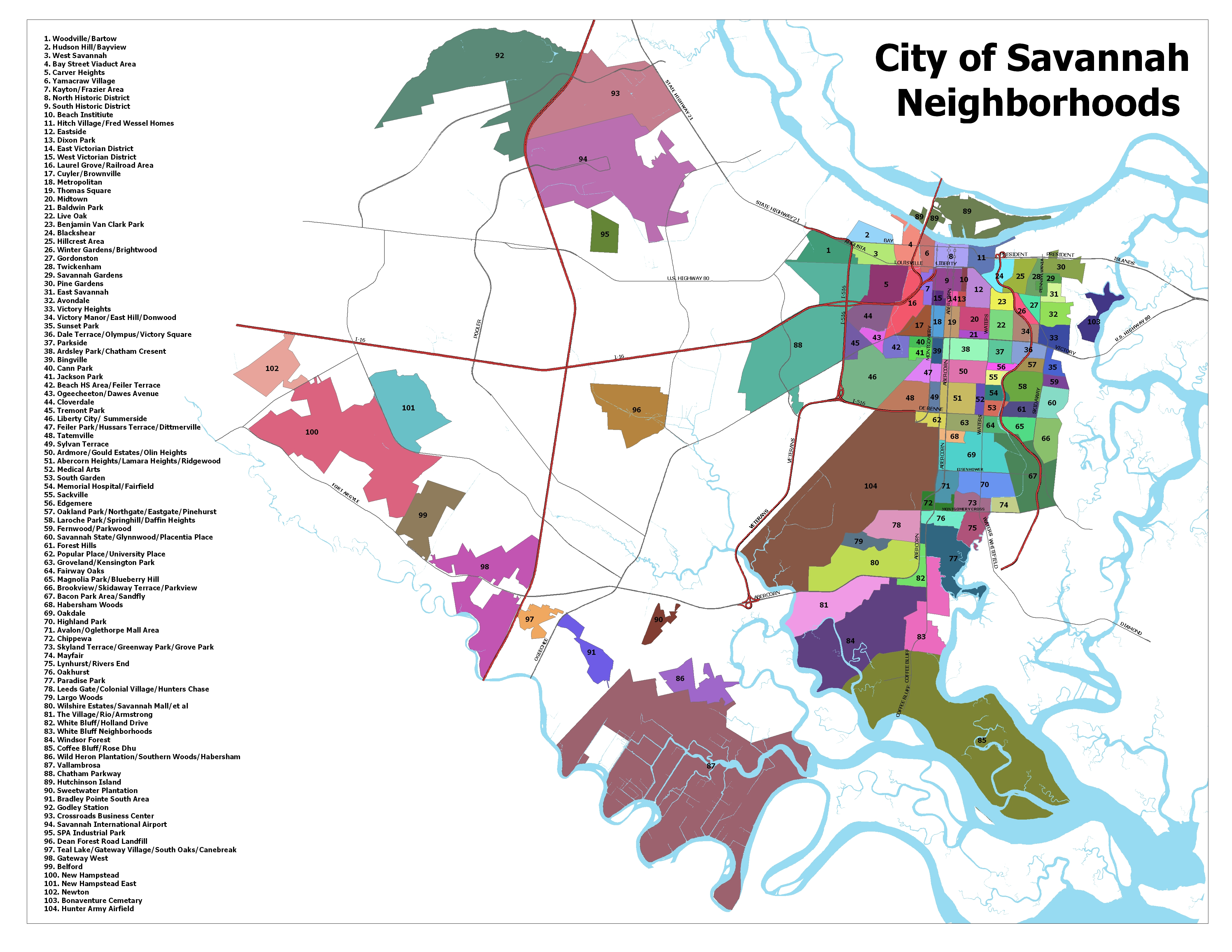
Map of Savannah neighborhoods

Savannah is a city of diverse neighborhoods. More than 100 distinct neighborhoods can be identified in six principal areas of the city: Downtown (Landmark Historic District and Victorian District), Midtown, Southside, Eastside, Westside, and Southwest/West Chatham (recently annexed suburban neighborhoods).

==== Historic districts ====
Besides the Savannah Historic District, one of the nation's largest, five other historic districts have been formally demarcated:

- Savannah Victorian Historic District
- Cuyler–Brownville Historic District
- Thomas Square Historic District
- Pin Point Historic District
- Ardsley Park–Chatham Crescent Historic District

== Demographics ==
Historical population
Census	Pop.	Note	%±
1800	5,146		—
1810	5,215		1.3%
1820	7,523		44.3%
1830	7,303		−2.9%
1840	11,214		53.6%
1850	15,312		36.5%
1860	22,292		45.6%
1870	28,235		26.7%
1880	30,709		8.8%
1890	43,189		40.6%
1900	54,244		25.6%
1910	65,064		19.9%
1920	83,252		28.0%
1930	85,024		2.1%
1940	95,996		12.9%
1950	119,638		24.6%
1960	149,245		24.7%
1970	118,349		−20.7%
1980	141,654		19.7%
1990	137,560		−2.9%
2000	131,510		−4.4%
2010	136,286		3.6%
2020	147,780		8.4%
2025 (est.)	149,440	▲	1.1%
U.S. Decennial Census; 1850-1870 1870-1880; 1890-1910 1920-1930; 1940 1950 1960; 1970 1980 1990; 2000 2010 2020; 2024

According to the U.S. Census Bureau, Savannah's official 2020 population was 147,780, up from the official 2010 count of 136,286 residents. The U.S. Census Bureau's official 2020 population of the Savannah metropolitan area—defined as Bryan, Chatham, and Effingham counties—was 404,798, up 16.45% from the 2010 census population of 347,611. Savannah is also the largest principal city of the Savannah–Hinesville–Statesboro combined statistical area. This larger trading area includes the Savannah and Hinesville metropolitan statistical areas as well as the Statesboro and Jesup micropolitan statistical areas. The official 2020 population of this area was 608,239, up from 525,844 at the 2010 census.

In 2010, there were 51,375 households, out of which 28.5% had children under the age of 18 living with them, 35.2% were married couples living together, 21.7% had a female householder with no husband present, and 38.9% were non-families. Among them, 31.4% of all households were made up of individuals, and 11.5% had someone living alone who was 65 years of age or older. The average household size was 2.45 and the average family size was 3.13. As of 2010, the median income for a household in the city was $29,038, and the median income for a family was $36,410. Males had a median income of $28,545 versus $22,309 for females. The per capita income for the city was $16,921. About 17.7% of families and 21.8% of the population were below the poverty line, including 31.4% of those under age 18 and 15.1% of those age 65 or over. By the 2022 American Community Survey, the median household income was $53,258 with a per capita income of $31,006.

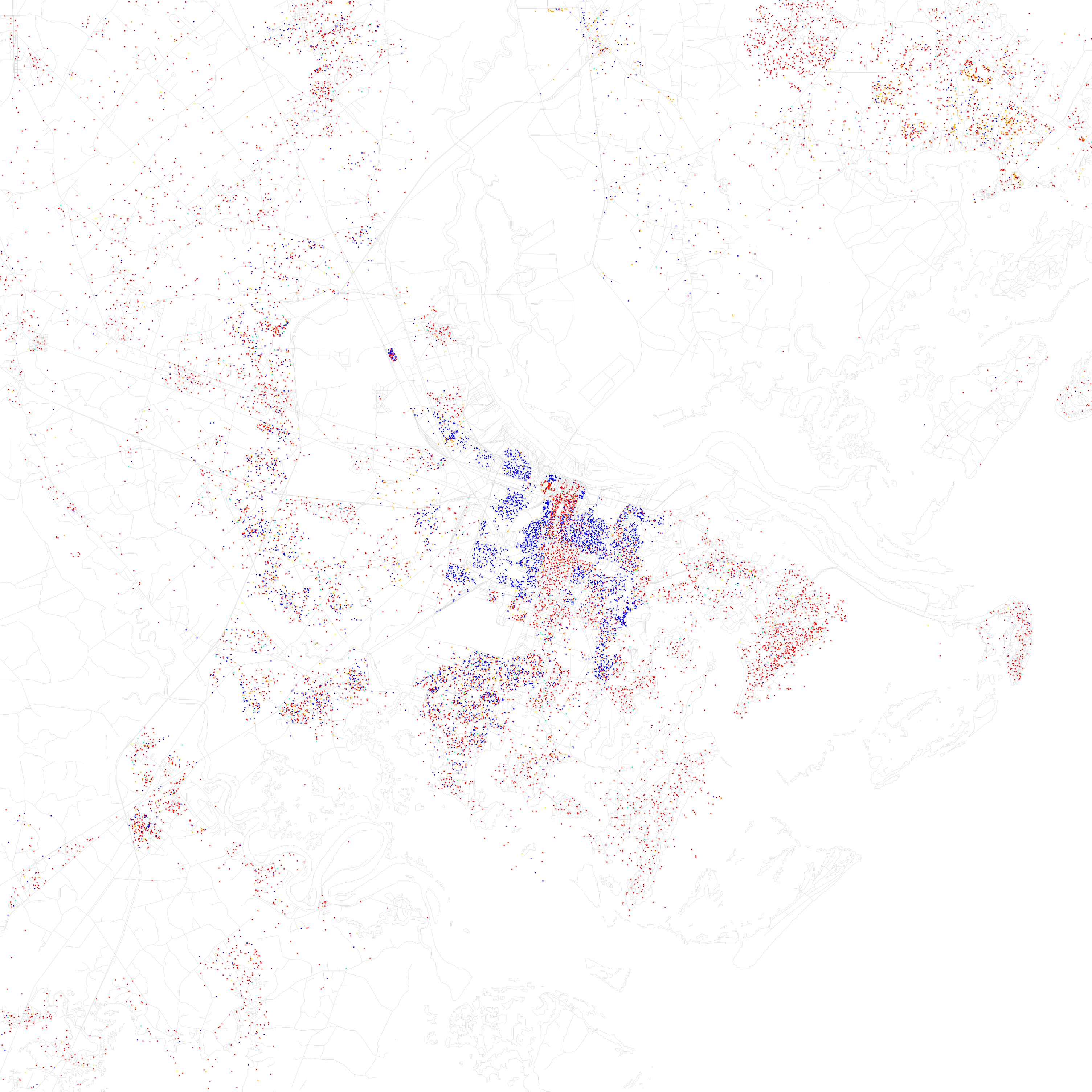
Racial distribution map of Savannah and Chatham County (source: 2010 U.S. census). Each dot represents 25 residents: White, Black, Asian, Hispanic or other (yellow).

=== Race and ethnicity ===
Savannah, Georgia – Racial and ethnic composition Note: the US Census treats Hispanic/Latino as an ethnic category. This table excludes Latinos from the racial categories and assigns them to a separate category. Hispanics/Latinos may be of any race.
Race / Ethnicity (NH = Non-Hispanic)	Pop 2000	Pop 2010	Pop 2020	% 2000	% 2010	% 2020
White alone (NH)	49,903	49,381	54,082	37.95%	36.23%	36.60%
Black or African American alone (NH)	74,691	74,782	71,845	56.79%	54.87%	48.62%
Native American or Alaska Native alone (NH)	277	315	311	0.21%	0.23%	0.21%
Asian alone (NH)	1,984	2,697	5,610	1.51%	1.98%	3.80%
Native Hawaiian or Pacific Islander alone (NH)	78	130	238	0.06%	0.10%	0.16%
Other race alone (NH)	188	242	692	0.14%	0.18%	0.47%
Mixed race or Multiracial (NH)	1,451	2,347	5,213	1.10%	1.72%	3.53%
Hispanic or Latino (any race)	2,938	6,392	9,789	2.23%	4.69%	6.62%
Total	131,510	136,286	147,780	100.00%	100.00%	100.00%

In 2010, the racial and ethnic makeup of the city was 55.04% Black, 38.03% White, 2.00% Asian, 0.03% Native American, 0.01% Pacific Islander, 0.93% from other races, and 2.01% from two or more races. Hispanic or Latino of any race were 4.07% of the population. Non-Hispanic whites were 32.6% of the population in 2010, compared to 46.2% in 1990. In 2020, its makeup was 48.62% Black or African American, 36.60% non-Hispanic white, 0.21% Native American, 3.80 Asian, 0.16% Pacific Islander, 0.47% some other race, 3.53% multiracial, and 6.62% Hispanic or Latino of any race.

=== Crime ===
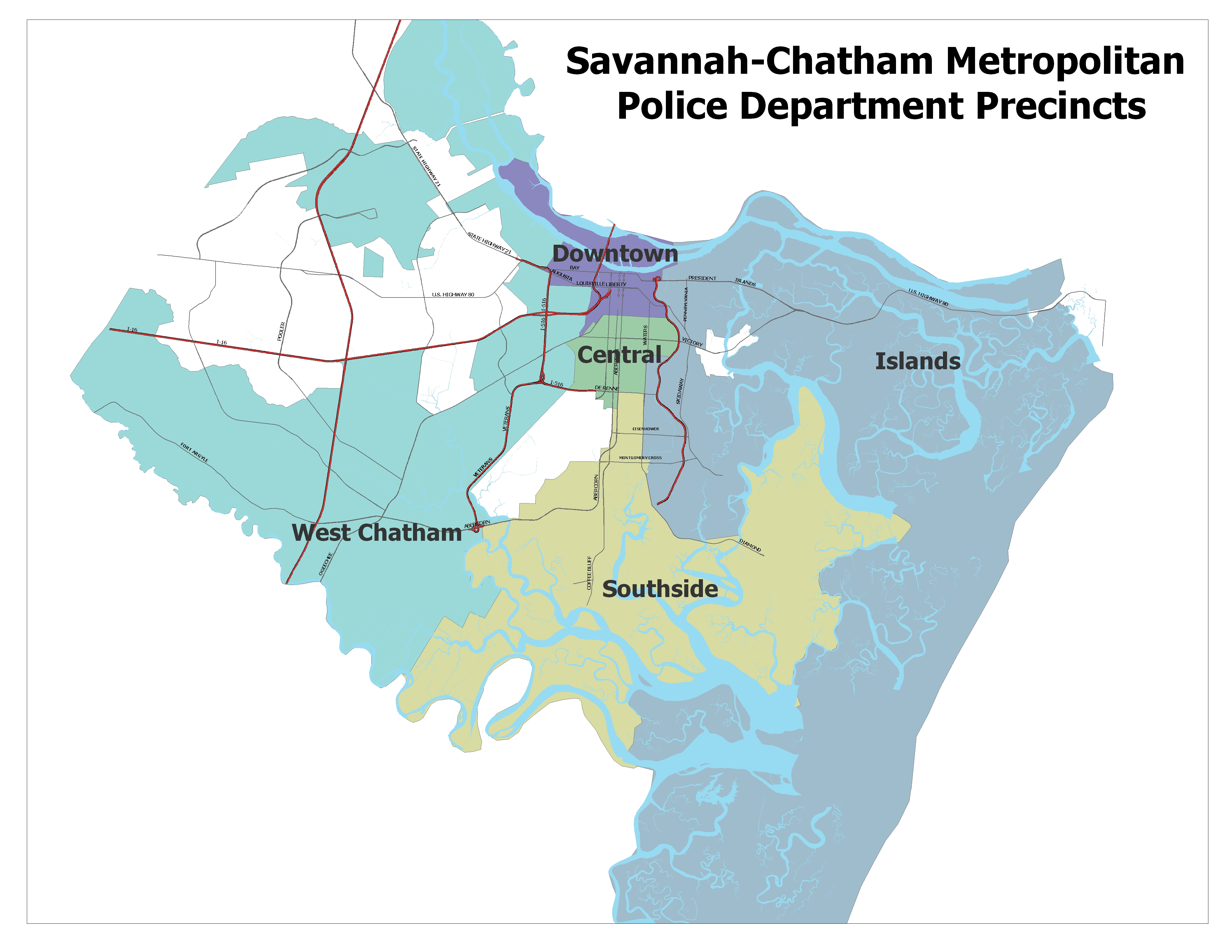
Map showing precincts of Savannah-Chatham Metropolitan Police Department

The total number of violent crimes in the Savannah-Chatham County reporting area ran just above 1,000 per year from 2003 through 2006. In 2007, however, the total number of violent crimes jumped to 1,163. Savannah-Chatham has recorded between 20 and 25 homicides each year since 2005.

In 2007, Savannah-Chatham recorded a sharp increase in home burglaries but a sharp decrease in thefts from parked automobiles. During the same year, statistics show a 29 percent increase in arrests for Part 1 crimes. An additional increase in burglaries occurred in 2008 with 2,429 residential burglaries reported to Savannah-Chatham police that year. That reflects an increase of 668 incidents from 2007. In 2007, there were 1,761 burglaries, according to metro police data. Savannah-Chatham police report that crimes reported in 2009 came in down 6 percent from 2008.

In 2009, 11,782 crimes were reported to metro police — 753 fewer than in 2008. Within 2009, there was a 12.2 percent decrease in violent crimes compared with 2008. Property crimes saw a 5.3 percent decline, which included a 5.2 percent reduction in residential burglary. In 2008, residential burglary was up by almost 40 percent. While some violent crimes increased in 2009, crimes like street robbery went down significantly. In 2009, 30 homicides were reported, four more than the year before. Also, 46 rapes were reported, nine more than the year before. In the meantime, street robbery decreased by 23 percent. In 2008, metro police achieved a 90 percent clearance rate for homicide cases, described as exceptional by violent crime unit supervisors. In 2009, the department had a clearance rate of 53 percent, which police attributed to outstanding warrants and grand jury presentations.

The SCMPD provides the public with up-to-date crime report information through an online mapping service. The year of 2015 saw a dramatic increase in the number of violent crimes, including at least 54 deaths due to gun violence, a number not seen since the early 1990s. The first quarter of 2018 saw crime trending downward, compared to 2017.

=== Religion ===
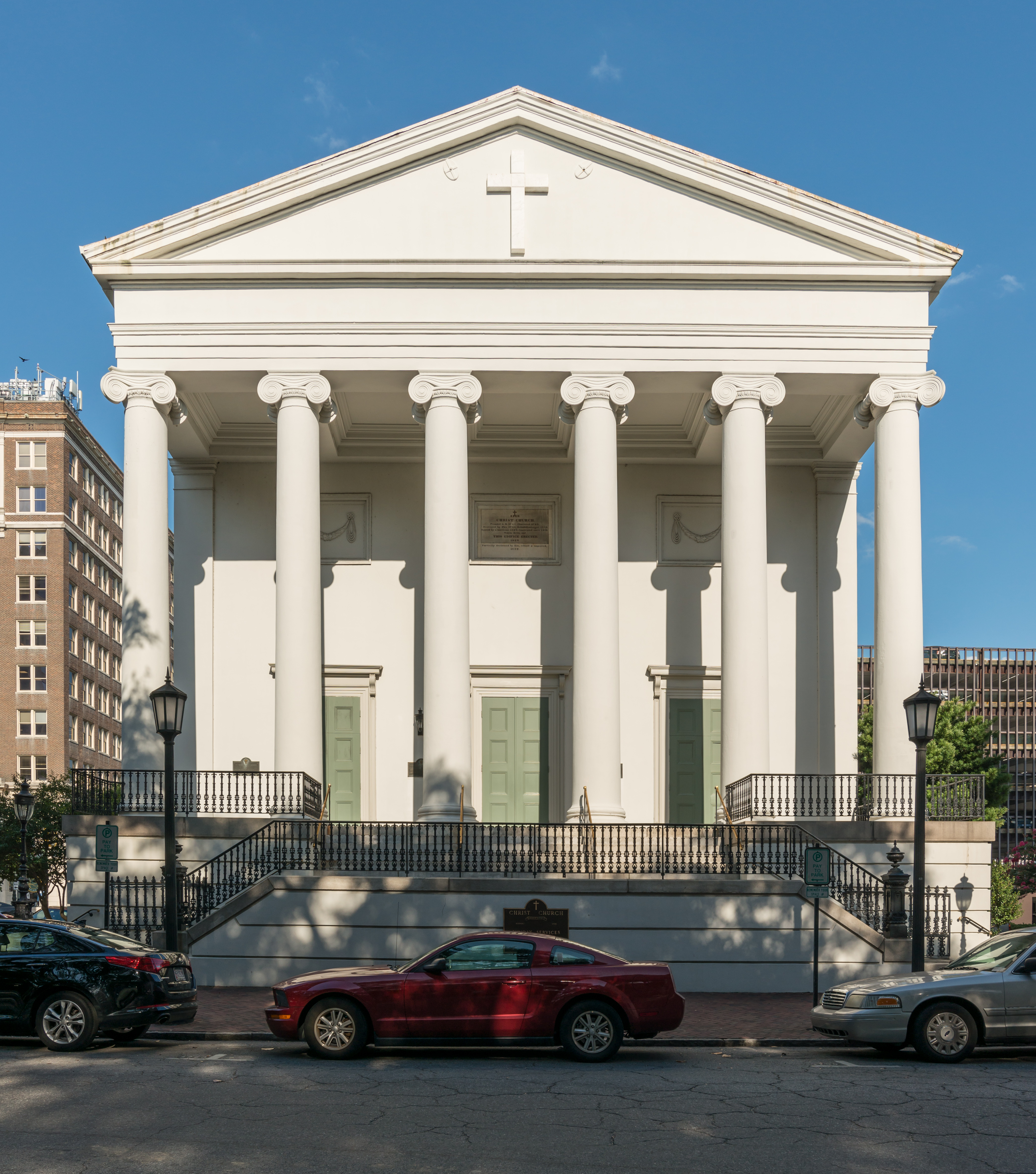
Christ Church Episcopal

Before British colonization of the Americas and the founding of colonial Georgia, the coastal region's indigenous inhabitants practiced Native American religions. Since colonization, the city of Savannah and the surrounding area have remained predominantly Christian. However, a Jewish community has lived in Savannah since the colony's first year. Later, Gullah-Geechee culture and Hoodoo practices were also observed, often alongside Christianity.

Founded in 1733, with the establishment of the Georgia colony, Christ Church is the longest continuous Christian congregation in Georgia. Early rectors include the Methodist evangelists John Wesley and George Whitefield. Christ Church continues as an active congregation located on its original site on Johnson Square. The Independent Presbyterian Church, which was founded in 1755, has represented the community's Presbyterian constituency. Other historically prominent churches have included: the First Bryan Baptist Church, an African American church that was organized by Andrew Bryan in 1788; First African Baptist Church; and St. Benedict the Moor Church, which was the first African American Catholic church in Georgia, and one of the oldest in the Southeast.

The oldest standing house of worship is First Baptist Church (1833), located on Chippewa Square. Other historic houses of worship in Savannah include: the Roman Catholic Cathedral of St. John the Baptist, the Episcopal St. John's Church, and Temple Mickve Israel (the third-oldest synagogue in the U.S.).

According to the Association of Religion Data Archives in 2020, the largest Christian group overall are Protestants within the Baptist tradition, served by the Southern Baptist Convention, National Baptist Convention, National Missionary Baptist Convention, and Progressive National Baptist Convention. Non-denominational Protestants represent the second-largest Christian group, including the Christian churches and Churches of Christ. Methodists are the third-largest, spread among the United Methodist Church and African Methodist Episcopal Church. The single second-largest Christian denomination is the Roman Catholic Church, served by the Diocese of Savannah.

Among Savannah's non-Christian population, which forms a minority, Hinduism is the city's second-largest religion. Judaism is Savannah's third-largest, with a history dating back to 1733. Orthodox Judaism, Reform Judaism, and Conservative Judaism are the predominant Jewish traditions adhered to. Islam is the area's fourth-largest religion, followed by the Baha'i.

== Economy ==
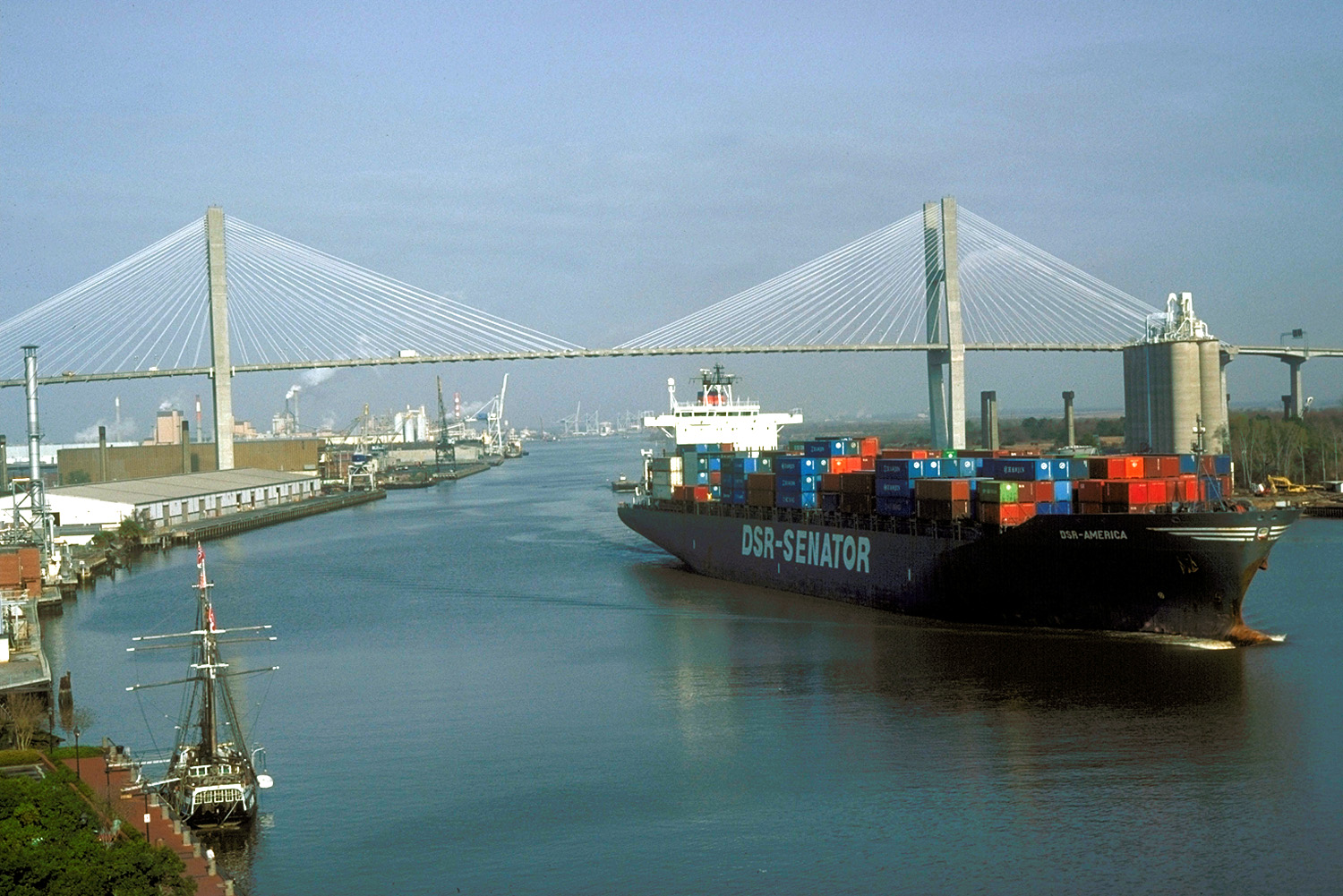
A container ship leaves the Port of Savannah after passing under the Talmadge Memorial Bridge and proceeding east down the Savannah River past the Savannah Historic District.

Agriculture was essential to Savannah's economy during its first two centuries. Silk and indigo production, both in demand in England, were early export commodities. By 1767, almost a ton of silk per year was exported to England. Georgia's mild climate offered perfect conditions for growing cotton, which became the dominant commodity after the American Revolution. Its production under the plantation system and shipment through the Port of Savannah helped the city's European immigrants achieve wealth and prosperity.

By the nineteenth century, the Port of Savannah had become one of the most active in the United States. In the United States' early years, goods produced in the New World had to pass through Atlantic ports such as Savannah's before they could be shipped to England. The Port of Savannah grew to become North America's fourth-largest port for shipping container traffic. In 2023, the port handled 4.9 million twenty-foot equivalent container units (TEU).

Savannah's first hotel, City Hotel, was completed in 1821. It also housed the city's first United States Post Office branch. Between 1912 and 1968, the Savannah Machine & Foundry Company was a shipbuilder in Savannah.

For years, Savannah was the home of Union Camp, which housed the world's largest paper mill. The plant is now owned by International Paper and remains one of Savannah's largest employers. Savannah is also home to the Gulfstream Aerospace Corporation, maker of private jets, and various other significant industrial interests. TitleMax is headquartered in Savannah. Morris Multimedia is a newspaper and television company based in Savannah.

In 2000, JCB, the third-largest producer of construction equipment in the world and the leading manufacturer of backhoes and telescopic handlers, built its North American headquarters near Savannah in Pooler on I-95 near Savannah/Hilton Head International Airport. By 2023, Naturals2Go relocated to Savannah, and Amazon has operated throughout Savannah and its metropolitan area since 2021.

=== Prisons ===
The Georgia Department of Corrections operates the Coastal State Prison in Savannah.

== Arts and culture ==
Beyond its architectural significance as the nation's largest, historically restored urban area, Savannah has a growing performing arts scene and offers cultural events throughout the year.

=== Books and literature ===
- The Savannah Book Festival – an annual book fair held on Presidents' Day weekend in the vicinity of historic Telfair and Wright squares, includes free presentations by more than 35 contemporary authors. Special events with featured writers are offered nominally throughout the year.
- Flannery O'Connor Childhood Home – a museum house dedicated to the work and life of the acclaimed fiction writer Flannery O'Connor, who was born in Savannah and lived in the city until the age of fifteen. In addition to its museum, the house offers literary programming, including the annual Ursrey Lecture honoring American fiction writers.
- Midnight in the Garden of Good and Evil is a non-fiction book by John Berendt, published in 1994 and set in Savannah's historic downtown. It was later made into a movie, directed by Clint Eastwood. (Note: The book and film have been credited with dramatically increasing tourism in Savannah in recent decades.)
- Other notable authors with ties to Savannah include Conrad Aiken, Mary Kay Andrews, and James Alan McPherson. The songwriter Johnny Mercer was a native Savannahian.
- Several of Caitlín R. Kiernan's works are set in Savannah, including In the Garden of Poisonous Flowers (novella, 2002) and "Houndwife" (short story, 2010).

=== Dance ===
- Savannah Ballet Theatre – established in 1998 as a nonprofit organization, it has grown to become the city's largest dance company.

=== Music ===
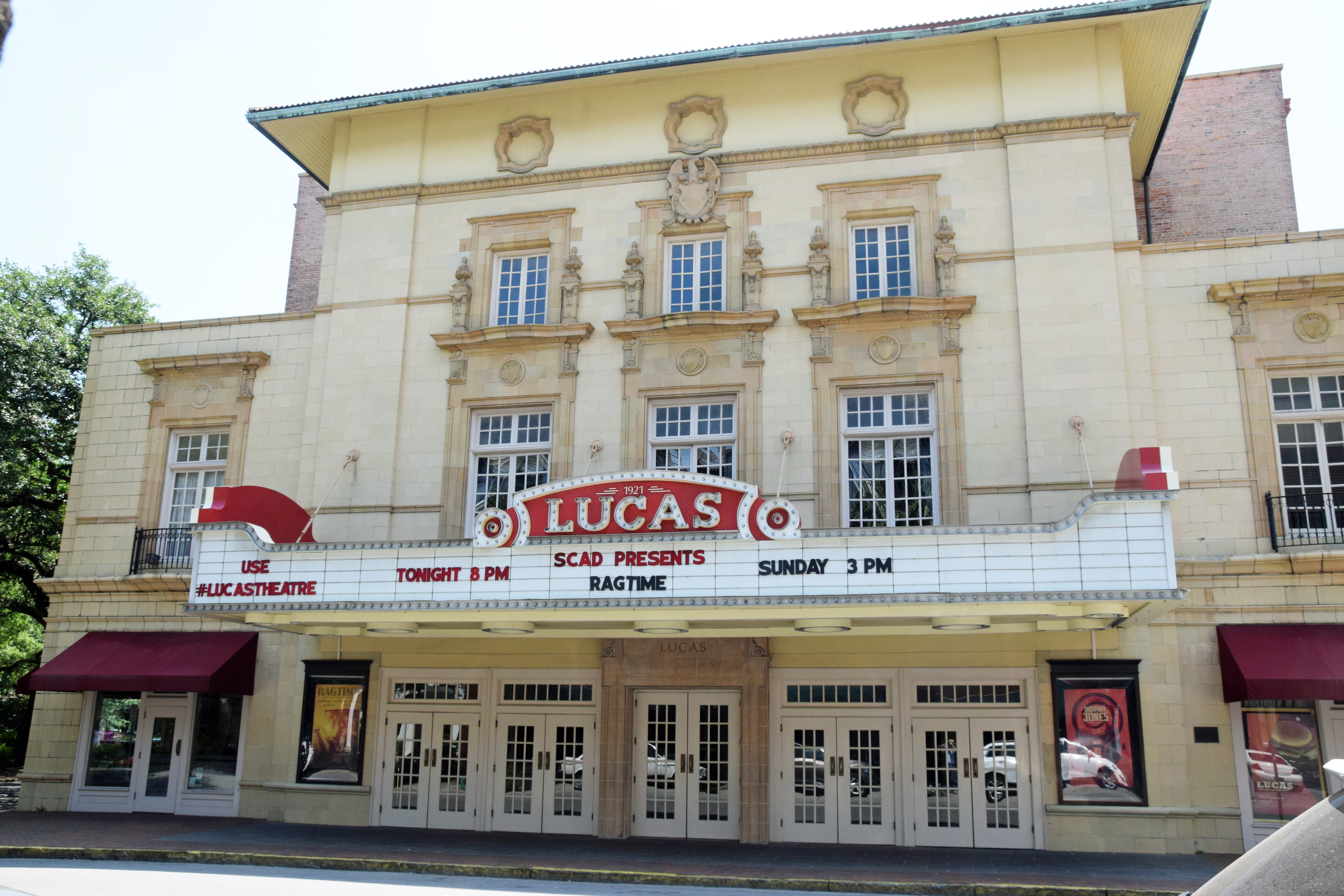
Lucas Theatre for the Arts

- The Coastal Jazz Association – presents a variety of jazz performances throughout the year in addition to hosting the annual Savannah Jazz Festival.
- Savannah Children's Choir – non-profit, auditioned choir for children in 2nd through 8th grades that performs throughout the community and in annual holiday and spring concerts.
- Savannah Concert Association – presents a variety of guest artists for chamber music performances each season. Performances are generally held in the Lucas Theatre for the Arts.
- Savannah Music Festival – Georgia's largest musical arts festival, an annual music event featuring diverse artists.
- The Savannah Orchestra – Savannah's professional orchestra presents an annual season of classical and popular concert performances.
- The Savannah Philharmonic – a professional orchestral and choral organization that presents year-round concerts (classical, pops, education).
- The Savannah Winds – amateur concert band hosted by the music department of Georgia Southern University.
- The Armstrong Youth Orchestra – Savannah's professional orchestra for elementary, middle school, high school, and some college students.
- Annual Haitian Flag Day – an annual festival of diverse artists, music, and various festivities.

=== Theater and performance ===
- The American Traditions Vocal Competition – an annual vocal competition that desires to foster and preserve traditions of musical expression significant in the culture of the United States in the past and present. The Competition includes the Johnny Mercer Award.
- Savannah Children's Theatre – a nonprofit, year-round drama theater company geared toward offering elementary through high school students (and adults) opportunities for participation in dramatic and musical productions.
- Savannah Community Theatre – a full theater season with a diverse programming schedule featuring some of Savannah's finest actors in an intimate, three-quarter-round space.
- Little Theatre of Savannah – founded in 1950, The Little Theatre of Savannah, Inc., is a nonprofit, volunteer-based community organization dedicated to celebrating the theater arts. Recognizing the unique social value, expressive fulfillment, and opportunity for personal growth that theater provides its participants, the Little Theatre of Savannah invites all members of the community to participate both on- and off-stage.
- The Savannah Theatre – Savannah's only fully professional resident theater, producing music revues with live singers, dancers, and the most rockin' band in town. Performances happen year-round, with several different titles and a holiday show.
- The Savannah Repertory Theatre – part of the cultural fabric of Savannah since 2016 and the city's only nonprofit professional theater.
- Lucas Theatre for the Arts – founded in December 1921, the Lucas Theatre is one of several theaters owned by the Savannah College of Art and Design. It hosts the annual Savannah Film Festival.
- Trustees Theater – once known as the Weis Theater, which opened on February 14, 1946, this theater reopened as the Trustees Theater on May 9, 1998, and hosts a variety of performances and concerts sponsored by the Savannah College of Art and Design. SCAD also owns the building.
- Odd Lot Improv – founded in 2010, a family-friendly improv comedy troupe performing weekly shows on Mondays and Fridays.
- House of Gunt – alternative drag collective founded in 2013 with monthly shows at Club One on top of other performances around the city throughout the year.

=== Visual and community arts ===
- Art Rise Savannah, Inc. – a local community nonprofit devoted to increasing access to the arts and improving opportunities for artists in the city.

=== LGBTQ+ ===
Savannah Pride Center is located in the downtown Historic District. As of April 2026, it is the only LGBTQ community center operating in the state of Georgia.

=== Culture ===
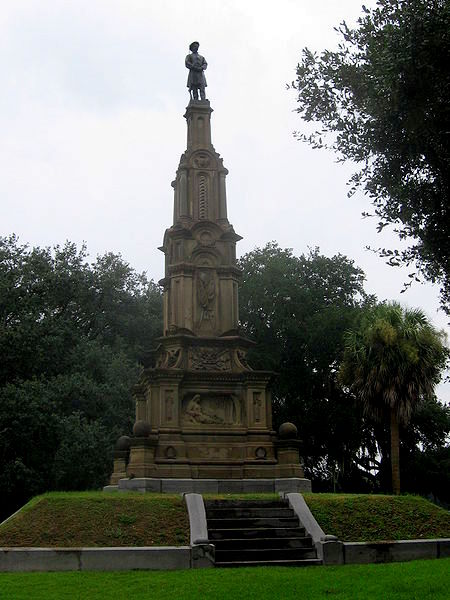
Confederate Monument in Forsyth Park

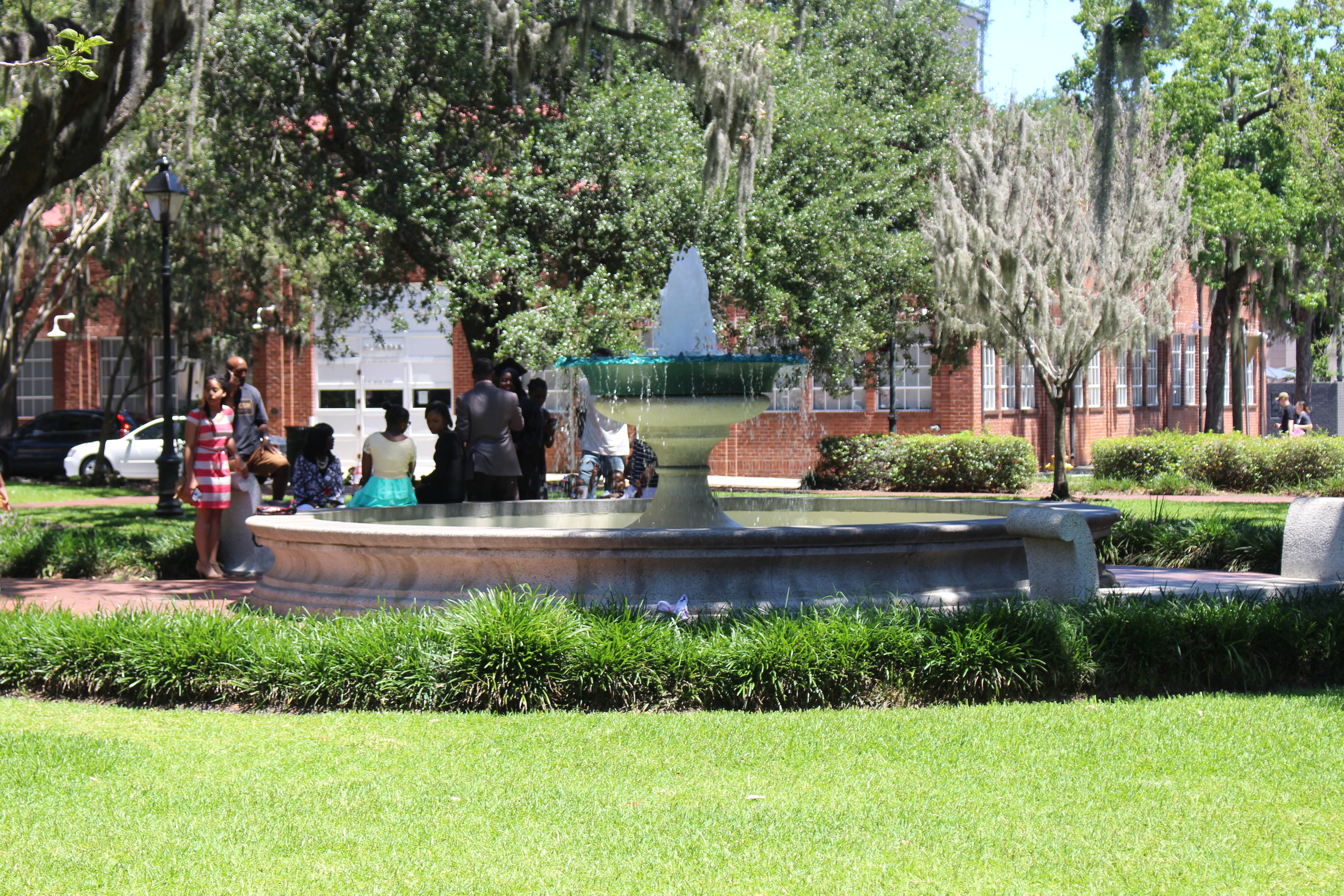
The German Memorial Fountain in Orleans Square was erected in 1989 to honor the accomplishments of German Americans in Savannah.

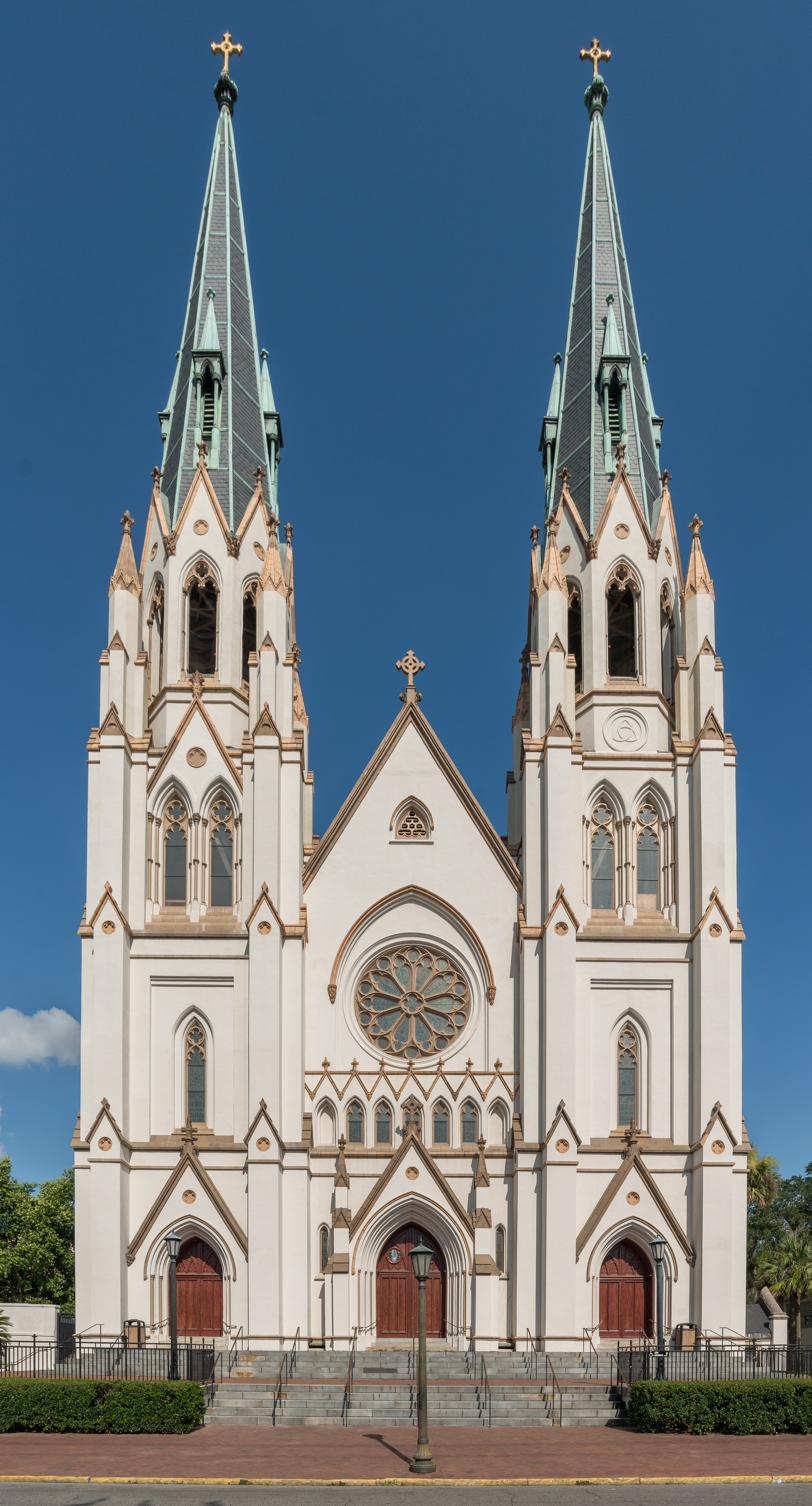
Cathedral Basilica of St. John the Baptist

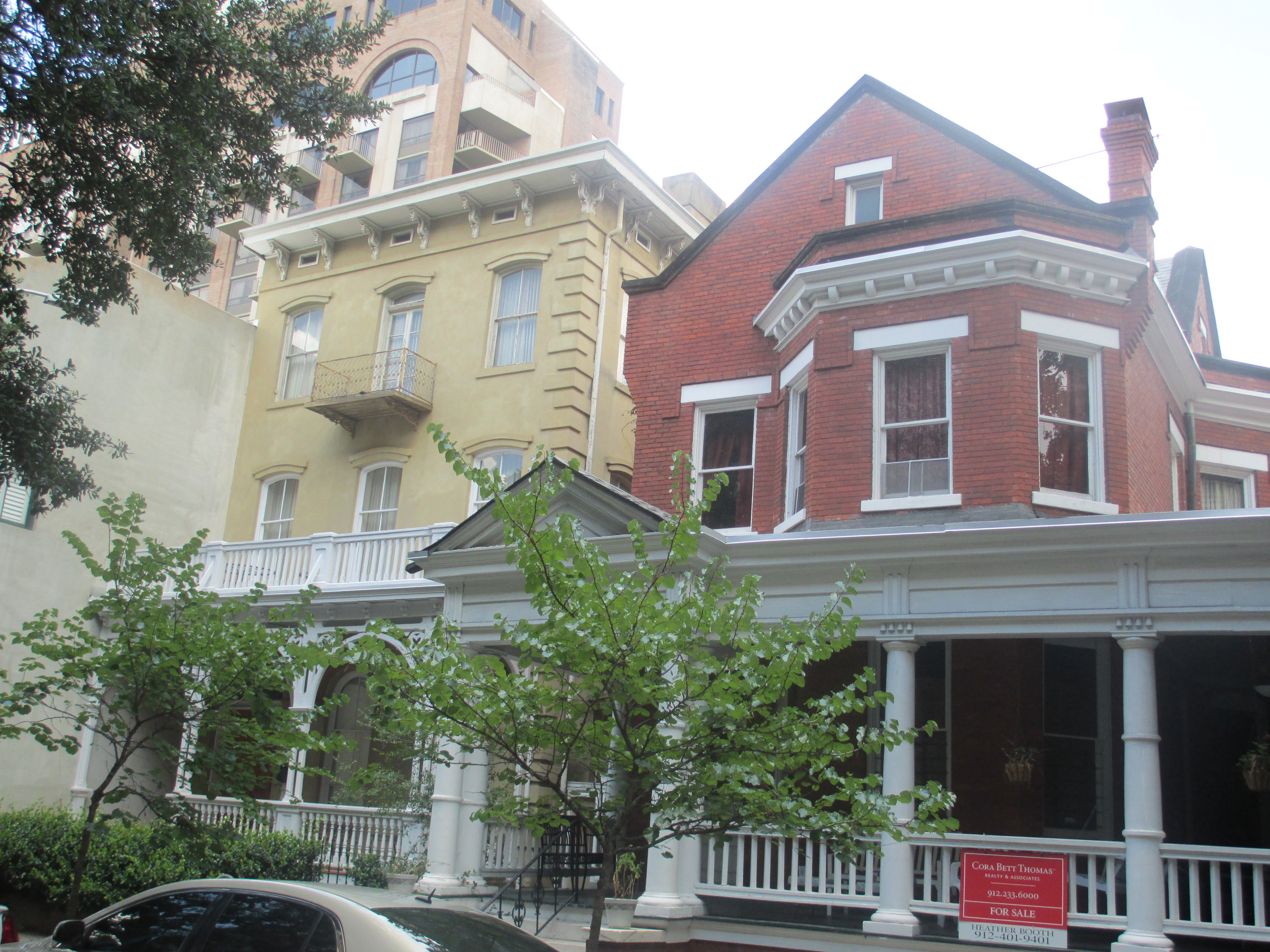
Typical houses in the Savannah Historic District; these are located near the Cathedral of St. John the Baptist.

Savannah's architecture, history, and reputation for Southern charm and hospitality are internationally known. The city's former promotional name was the "Hostess City of the South", which the city government still uses. An earlier nickname was "the Forest City", in reference to the large population of live oak trees that flourish in the Savannah area. These trees were especially valuable in shipbuilding during the 19th century. In 2019, Savannah attracted 14.8 million tourists from across the country and around the world. Savannah's downtown area is one of the largest National Historic Landmark districts in the United States.

The city's location offers visitors access to the coastal islands and the Savannah Riverfront, both popular tourist destinations. Tybee Island (officially named Savannah Beach from 1929 until 1978) is a beach community and the site of the historic Tybee Island Light Station, the first lighthouse on the southern Atlantic coast. Other picturesque towns adjacent to Savannah include the shrimping village of Thunderbolt and three residential areas that began as summer resort communities for Savannahians: Beaulieu, Vernonburg, and the Isle of Hope.

The Savannah Convention Center is located on Hutchinson Island, which lies across from downtown Savannah and is surrounded by the Savannah River. The Savannah Belles Ferry connects the island with the mainland, as does the Talmadge Memorial Bridge.

The Georgia Historical Society is an independent educational and research institution with a research center in Savannah. The center's library and archives hold the oldest materials related to Georgia's history.

The Savannah Civic Center on Montgomery Street hosts more than nine hundred events annually.

Savannah has consistently been named one of "America's Favorite Cities" by Travel + Leisure. In 2012, the magazine rated Savannah highest in "Quality of Life and Visitor Experience". Savannah was also ranked first for "Public Parks and Outdoor Access", visiting in the Fall, and as a romantic escape. Savannah was also named as America's second-best city for "Cool Buildings and Architecture", behind only Chicago.

The mile-long Jones Street, in Savannah's Historic District, has been described as one of the most charming streets in the United States.

=== Squares ===
Savannah is noted for its 22 squares and small parks along five historic streets running north to south. Each street has between three and five squares. The squares vary in size and character, from the formal fountain and monuments of the largest, Johnson, to the playgrounds of the smallest, Crawford. Elbert, Ellis, and Liberty Squares are classified as the three "lost squares" destroyed in the course of urban development during the 1950s. Elbert and Liberty Squares were paved over to make way for a realignment of U.S. Route 17, while Ellis Square was demolished to build the City Market parking garage. The city restored Ellis Square after razing the parking garage. The garage was rebuilt as an underground facility, the Whitaker Street Parking Garage, and opened in January 2009. The restored Ellis Square opened in March 2010. Separate efforts are now underway to revive Elbert and Liberty Squares.

Franklin Square is the site of Savannah's Haitian Monument, which commemorates the heroic efforts of the Chasseurs-Volontaires de Saint-Domingue in the 1779 Siege of Savannah and for an independent America. One of the few black regiments to fight for the American side in the Revolutionary War, the soldiers were recruited from present-day Haiti, which was the French colony of Saint-Domingue until its independence in 1804. Chippewa Square honors the Battle of Chippawa during the War of 1812. It features a large statue of James Oglethorpe, the city's founder. In popular culture, the square is the location of the park bench seen in the 1994 film Forrest Gump from which the title character dispenses wisdom to others waiting for a bus.

Because both Calhoun Square (the official name until 2022) and Whitefield Square were named for prominent slaveholders, a movement was begun in 2021 to rename them Sankofa Square and Jubilee Square, respectively. Calhoun Square was renamed Taylor Square in 2024.

=== Historic homes ===
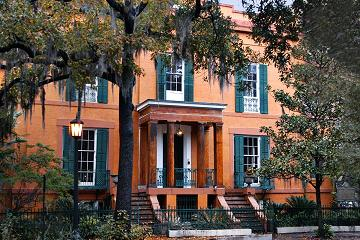
Sorrel–Weed House

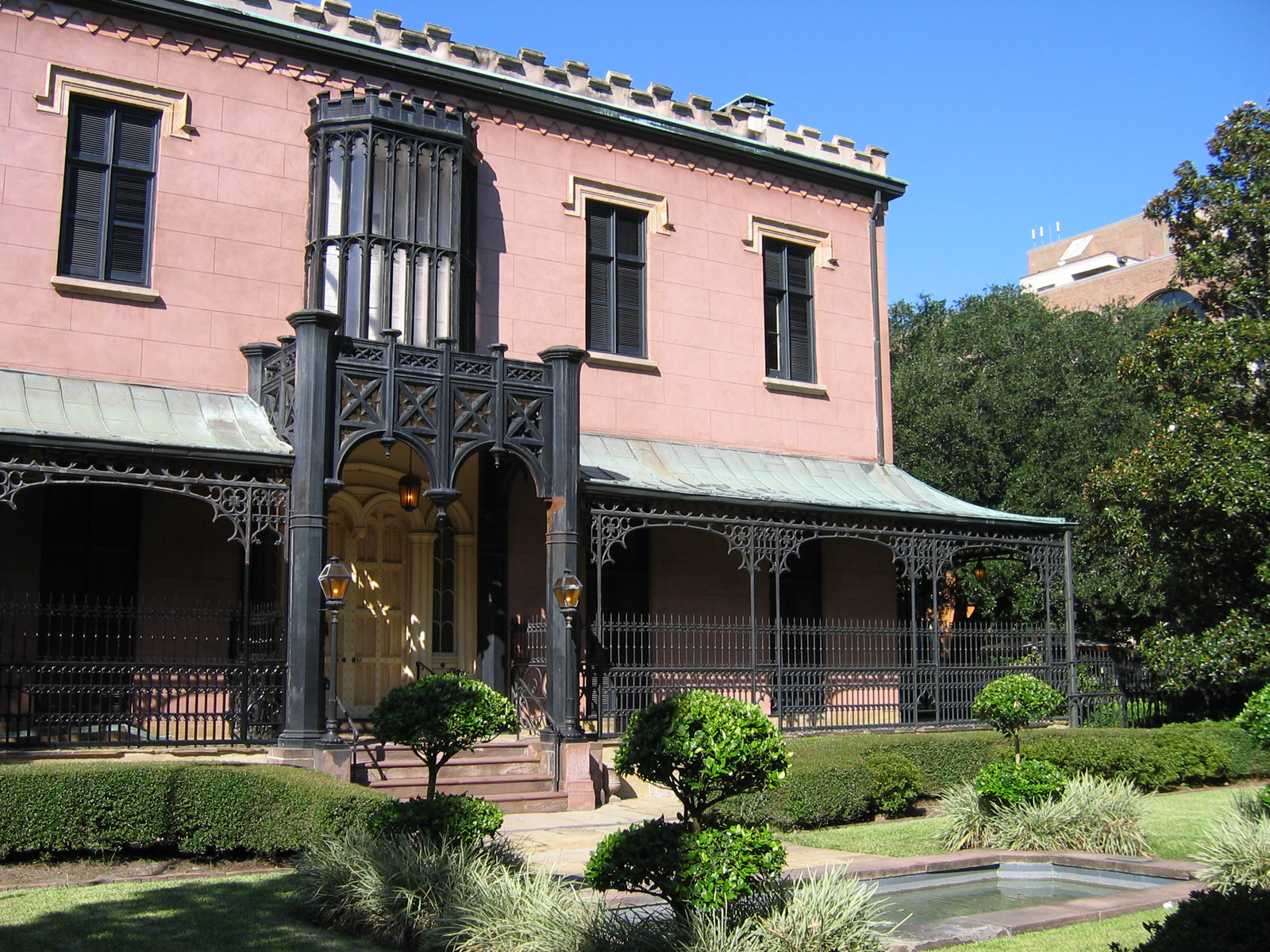
Green–Meldrim House

Among the historic homes that have been preserved are: the Olde Pink House, the Sorrel–Weed House, Juliette Gordon Low's birthplace, the Davenport House Museum, the Green–Meldrim House, the Owens–Thomas House, the William Scarbrough House, and the Wormsloe plantation of Noble Jones. Mercer Williams House, the former home of Jim Williams in Monterey Square, is the main location of Midnight in the Garden of Good and Evil.

Opulent buildings that succumbed to fire include the mansions at Bonaventure Plantation and Greenwich Plantation.

=== Historic cemeteries ===
Colonial Park Cemetery was the city's principal burial ground for much of the eighteenth century when Georgia was a British colony. Laurel Grove Cemetery, with the graves of many Confederate soldiers and enslaved African Americans, was Savannah's chief municipal cemetery during the nineteenth century. Bonaventure Cemetery is a former plantation and the final resting place for some illustrious Savannahians. Also located in Savannah are the Mordecai Sheftall Cemetery and the Levi Sheftall Family Cemetery, which both date back to the second half of the eighteenth century.

=== Historic forts ===
Fort Jackson (named for the Georgia politician James Jackson, not Andrew Jackson) lies on the Savannah River, one mile east of Savannah's Historic District. Built between 1808 and 1812 to protect the city from attack by sea, it was one of several Confederate forts defending Savannah from Union forces during the Civil War. Fort Pulaski National Monument, located on Cockspur Island, 17 miles (27 km) east of Savannah, preserves the largest fort protecting the city during the war. The Union Army bombarded Fort Pulaski in April 1862 with the aid of a new rifled cannon. Confederate troops soon surrendered, and the cannon rendered all brick fortifications obsolete.

=== Other historic sites ===
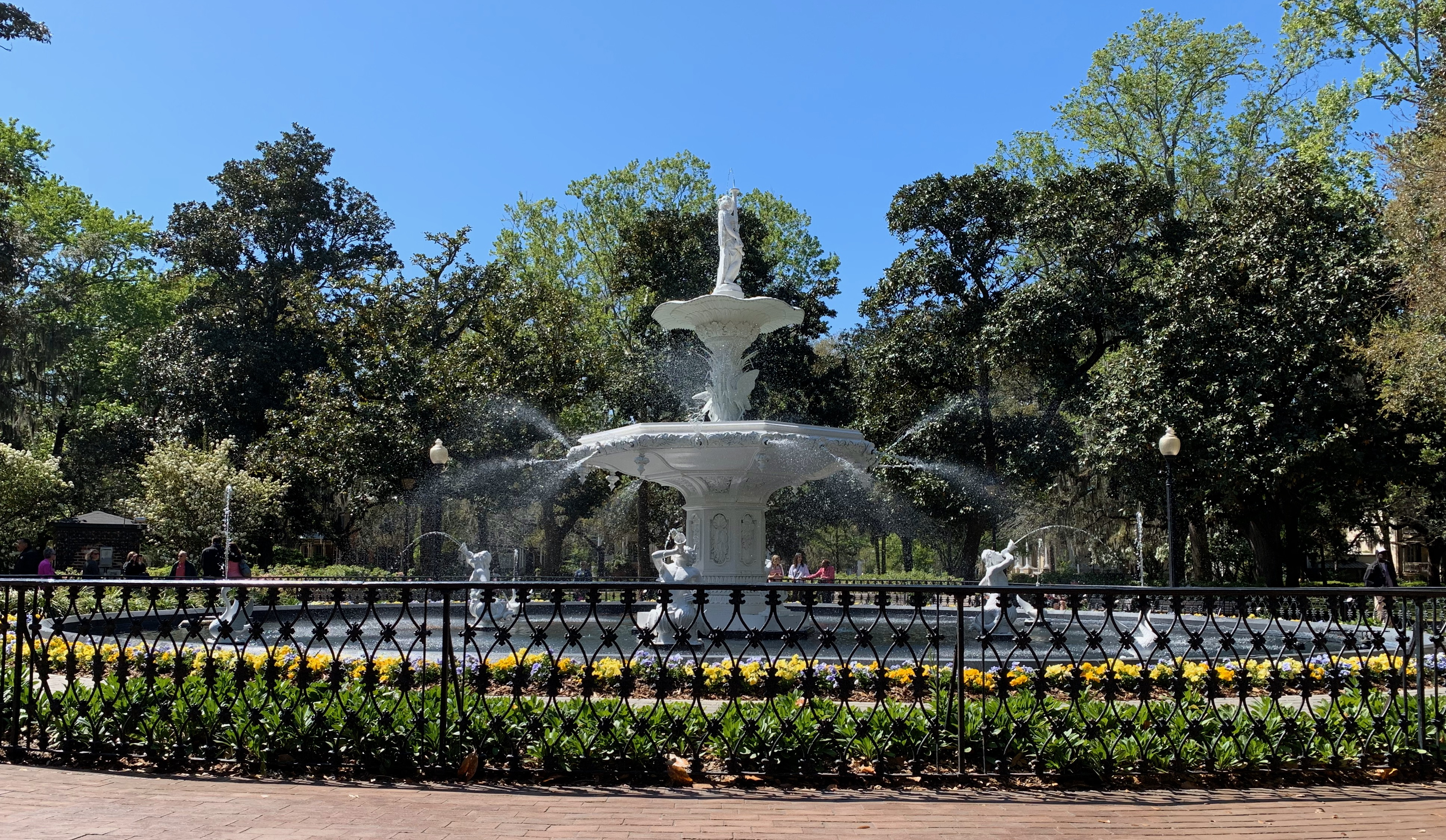
Forsyth Park

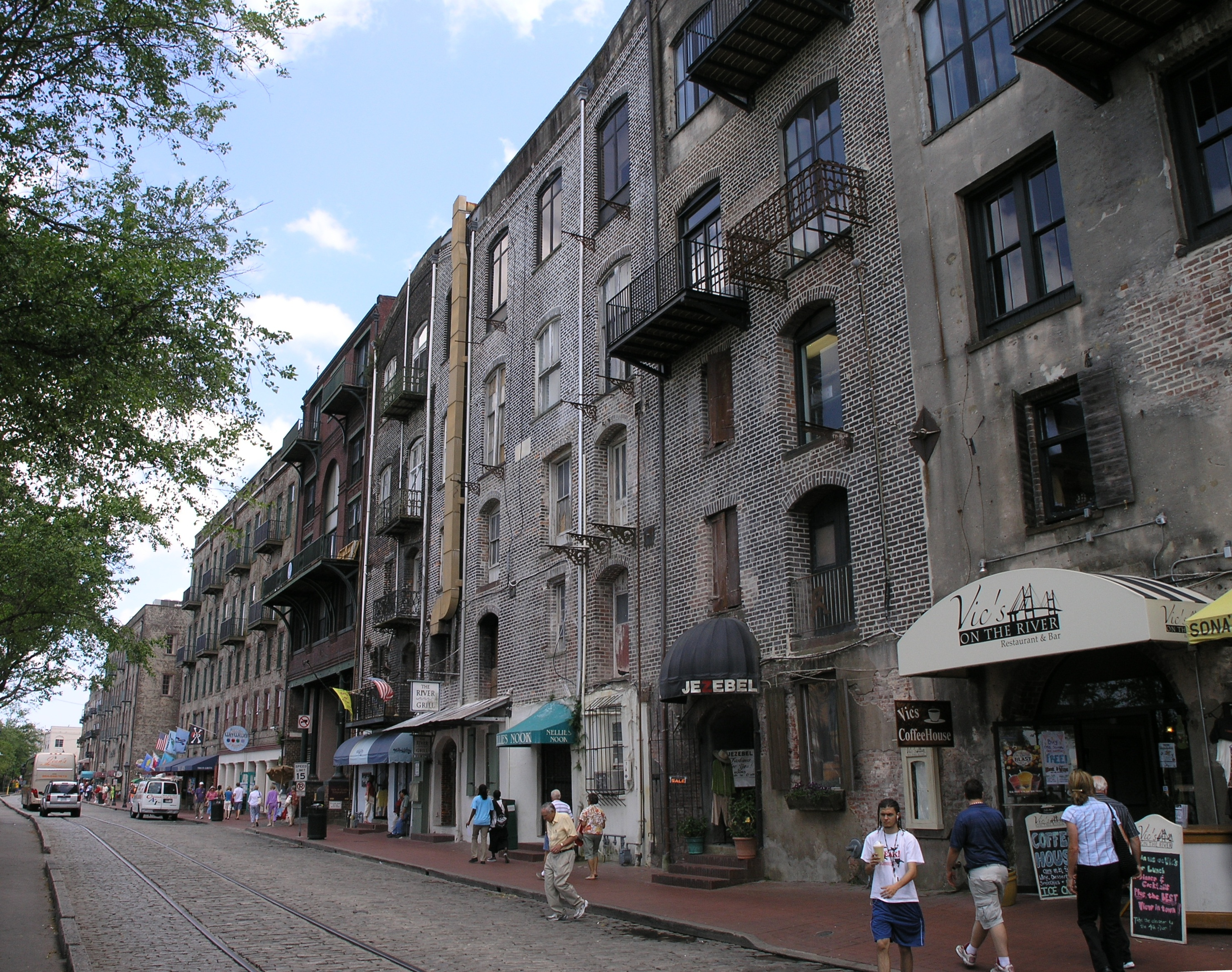
River Street

- The Savannah Historic District (including notable buildings) and the Savannah Victorian Historic District
- Forsyth Park
- Juliette Gordon Low Historic District
- Central of Georgia Railroad: Savannah Shops and Terminal Facilities and Central of Georgia Depot and Trainshed – a 33.2-acre (134,000 m^{2}) historic district that was listed on the National Register of Historic Places in 1978.
- John P. Rousakis Riverfront Plaza
- Factors Walk and River Street's pedestrian promenade, restored nineteenth-century cotton warehouses, and passageways include shops, bars, and restaurants.
- City Market – Savannah's restored central market and popular nightlife destination features antiques, souvenirs, small eateries, and two large outdoor plazas.
- Savannah State University campus and Walter Bernard Hill Hall – The Georgia Historical Commission and the Georgia Department of Natural Resources have recognized both the Savannah State campus and Hill Hall as a part of the Georgia Historical Marker Program. Hill Hall, which was built in 1901, was added to the National Register of Historic Places in 1981.
- Telfair Museum of Art and Telfair Academy of Arts of Sciences – the South's first public art museum.
- Wormsloe Plantation – the partially restored house and grounds of an 18th-century Georgia plantation.

=== Shopping ===
Various shopping centers exist throughout the city, including Abercorn Common, Savannah Historic District, Oglethorpe Mall, Savannah Mall, and Abercorn Walk.

=== Other attractions ===
- American Prohibition Museum – Located in Savannah's City Market, this unique museum displays the history of prohibition in America from 1907 to 1933. It also traces the roots of NASCAR, which developed from the era's bootlegging operations.
- Clary's Cafe – featured in both the 1994 book and 1997 film Midnight in the Garden of Good and Evil.
- Club One – former home of The Lady Chablis and also featured in Midnight in the Garden of Good and Evil.
- Coastal Georgia Botanical Gardens – a developing botanical garden located at Bamboo Farm, a former USDA plant-introduction station south of Savannah that began operations in 1919.
- Crystal Beer Parlor, the city's oldest restaurant.
- Oatland Island Wildlife Center – located east of Savannah, a facility owned and operated by the Savannah-Chatham County Board of Education featuring wildlife from surrounding coastal Georgia and South Carolina.
- Leopold's Ice Cream, a popular ice cream parlor.
- Ossabaw Island – an environmentally protected and commercially undeveloped barrier island south of Savannah.
- Pinkie Masters Bar – a popular Savannah watering hole and the site of presidential visits and political campaigns. Pinkie Masters was a local political figure and a friend of President Jimmy Carter, who visited the bar and the city several times.
- Pirates' House – historic restaurant and tavern located in downtown Savannah.
- Ralph Mark Gilbert Civil Rights Museum – a museum dedicated to African-American history in Savannah.
- Skidaway Island – an affluent suburban community south of Savannah that hosts Skidaway Island State Park, the University of Georgia Aquarium and the Skidaway Institute of Oceanography.
- Tybee Island – popular Atlantic resort town 17 mi (27 km) east of Savannah, with public beaches, a lighthouse, and other attractions.
- Waving Girl statue, honoring Florence Martus.

== Sports ==
Portions of the East Coast Greenway, a 3,000-mile (5,000-kilometer) system of trails running from Maine to Florida, run through Savannah.

=== Professional sport teams ===
Team	Sport	League	Venue	Championships	Years
Savannah Braves	Baseball	Southern League	Grayson Stadium		1971–1983
Savannah Cardinals / Savannah Sand Gnats	Baseball	South Atlantic League	Grayson Stadium	4 (1993, 1994, 1996, 2013)	1984–2015
Savannah Spirits	Basketball	Continental Basketball Association	Savannah Civic Center		1986–1988
Savannah Wildcats	Basketball	Continental Basketball League	Georgia Southern University–Armstrong Campus	1 (2010)	2010
Savannah Storm / C-Port Trojans	Basketball	East Coast Basketball League	Savannah High School		2010–2018
Savannah Steam	American football	American Indoor Football	Tiger Arena		2015–2016
Savannah Clovers FC	Soccer	United Premier Soccer League / National Independent Soccer Association	Memorial Stadium	1 (2019)	2016–2024
Savannah Buccaneers	Basketball	The Basketball League	Tiger Arena		2023–2024
Savannah Bananas	Baseball / Banana Ball	Coastal Plain League / Banana Ball Championship League	Grayson Stadium	3 (2016, 2021, 2022)	2016–present
Savannah Ghost Pirates	Ice hockey	ECHL	Enmarket Arena		2022–present
Savannah Steel	Women's basketball	UpShot League	Enmarket Arena		2026–present

=== Collegiate sports teams ===
Club	Affiliation	Conference	Venues	Notes
Savannah College of Art and Design Bees	NAIA	Sun Conference	SCAD Athletic Complex, Ronald C. Waranch Equestrian Center	
Savannah State Tigers and Lady Tigers	NCAA Division II	Southern Intercollegiate Athletic Conference	Tiger Arena, Ted Wright Stadium	

== Government ==
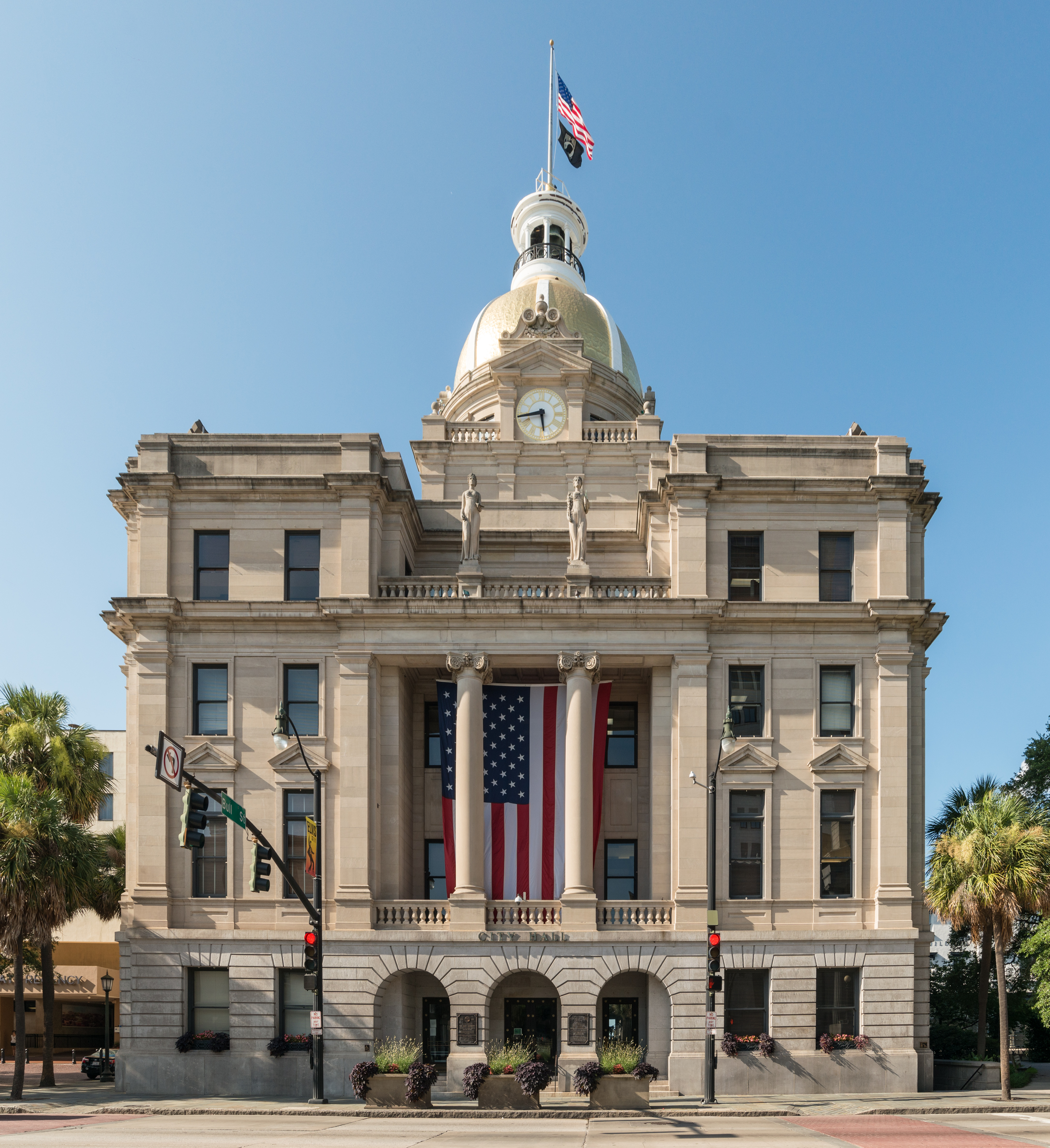
With its distinctive dome in tissue-paper-thin, 23-karat gold leaf, Savannah's City Hall (1906), which stands on Bay Street at the head of Bull Street, is the first building constructed for exclusive use by the municipal government.

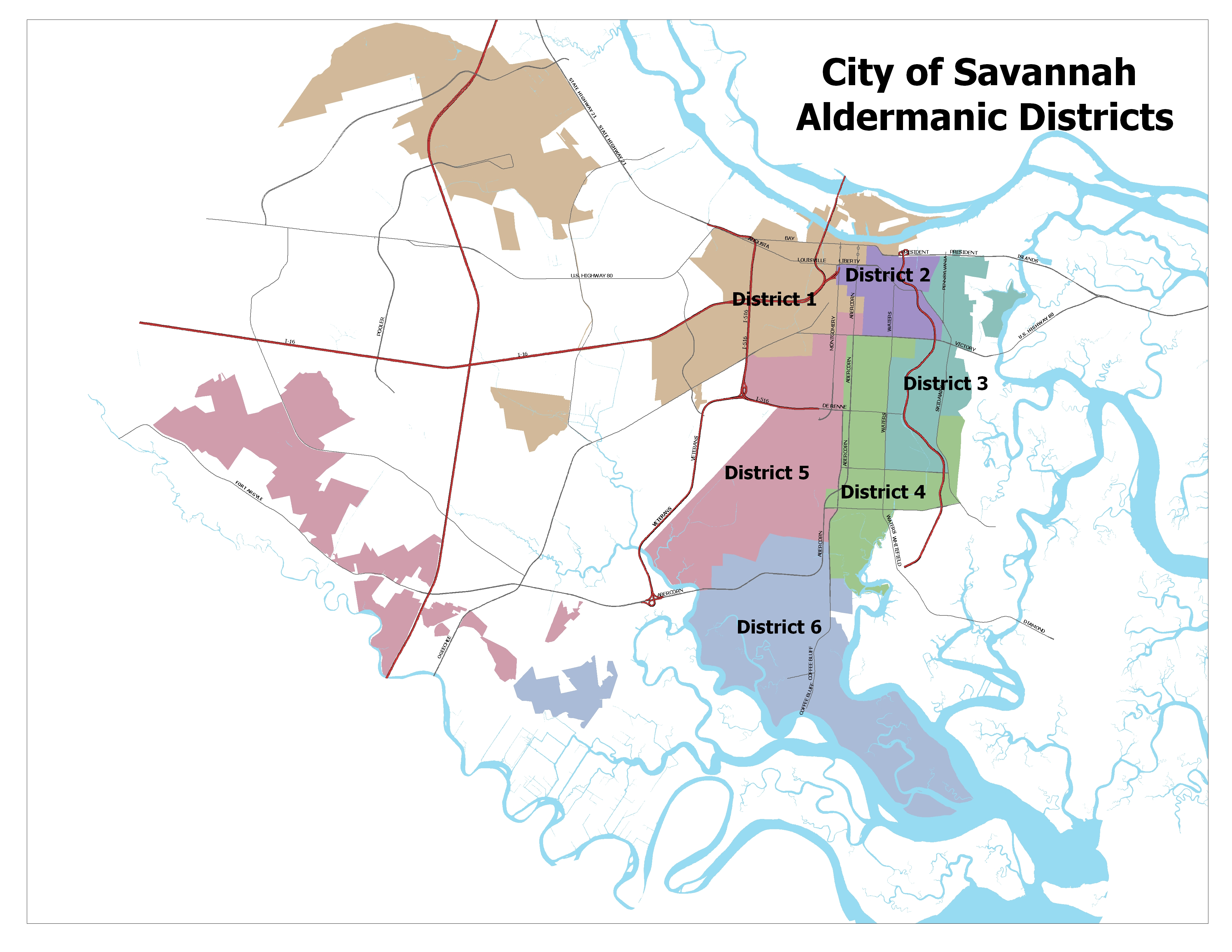
Map of Savannah's aldermanic districts

Savannah adopted a council-manager form of government in 1954. The city council consists of the mayor and eight aldermen, six of whom are elected from one of six aldermanic districts, each electing one member. The other two members and the mayor are elected at-large.

The council levies taxes, enacts ordinances, adopts the annual budget, and appoints the city manager. The city manager enacts the policies and programs established by council, recommends an annual budget and work programs, appoints bureau and department heads, and exercises general supervision and control over all employees of the city.

=== State representation ===
Derek Mallow (D) and Ben Watson (R) represent the Savannah area in the Georgia State Senate. Carl Gilliard (D), Anne Allen Westbrook (D), Ron Stephens (R), Edna Jackson (D) and Jesse Petrea (R) represent the area in the Georgia House of Representatives.

== Education ==
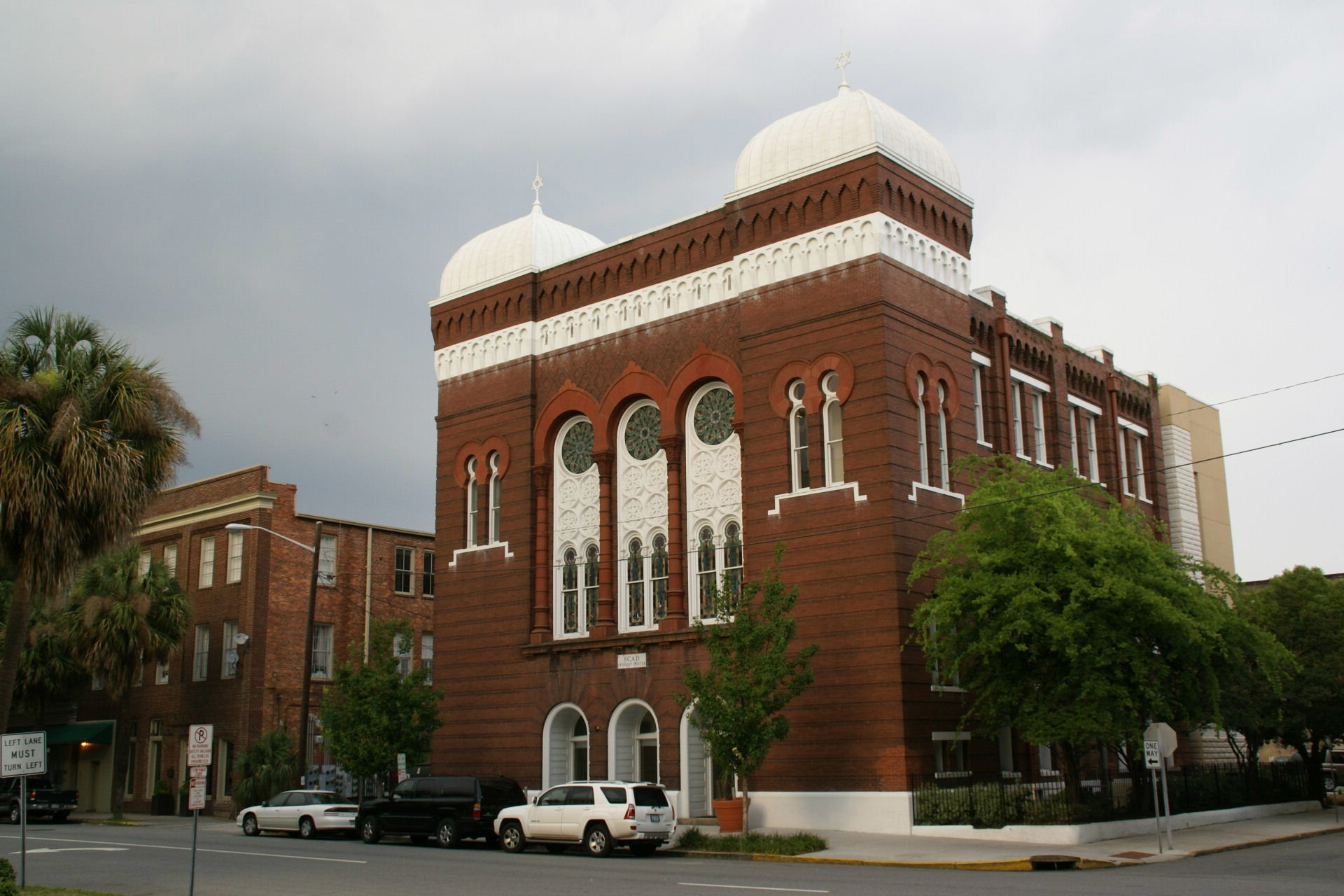
Student center of SCAD, Savannah campus (the building was formerly a synagogue)

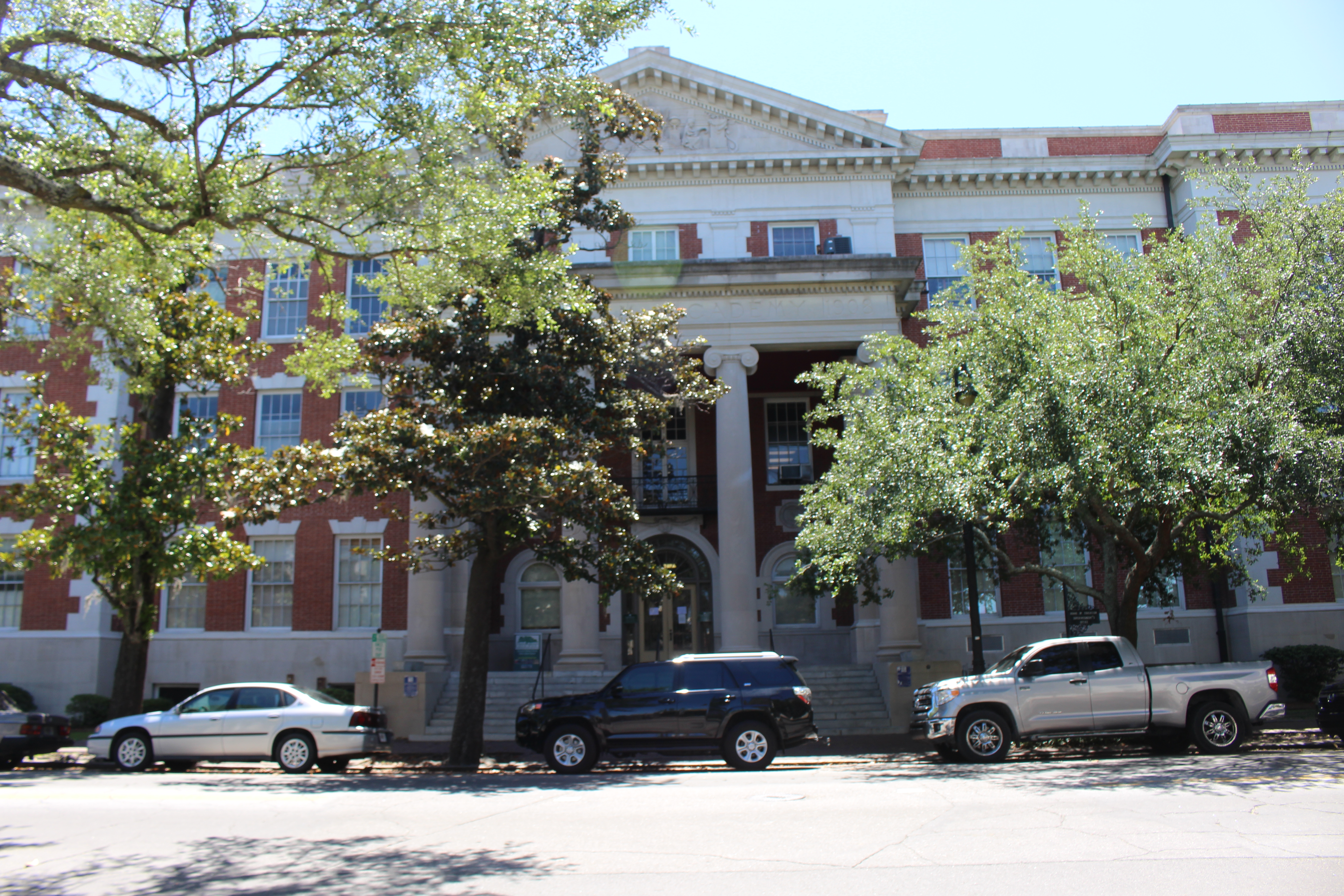
Savannah-Chatham County Public Schools headquarters

Savannah hosts four colleges and universities offering bachelor's, master's, and professional or doctoral degree programs: Georgia Southern University-Armstrong Campus, Savannah College of Art and Design (SCAD), Savannah State University, and South University. In addition, Georgia Tech Savannah offers certificate programs and Georgia Southern University has a satellite campus in the downtown area. Savannah Technical College, a two-year institution in the city, and the Skidaway Institute of Oceanography, a marine science research institute of the University of Georgia located on the northern end of Skidaway Island, offer educational programs as well. Savannah is also the location of Ralston College, an unaccredited liberal arts college founded in 2010.

Mercer University began a four-year doctor of medicine program in August 2008 at Memorial University Medical Center. Mercer, with its main campus in Macon, received additional state funding in 2007 to expand its existing partnership with Memorial by establishing a four-year medical school in Savannah (the first in southern Georgia). Third- and fourth-year Mercer students have completed two-year clinical rotations at Memorial since 1996; approximately 100 residents are trained yearly in several medical practices. The expanded program opened in August 2008 with 30 first-year students.

Savannah Law School, which opened in 2012 in the historic Candler building on Forsyth Park, ceased operations in 2018.

Savannah is also home to most of the schools in the Chatham County school district, the Savannah-Chatham County Public Schools. Notable secondary schools in Savannah-Chatham County include the following:

- Beach High School
- Benedictine Military School
- Calvary Day School
- Groves High School
- Islands High School
- Jenkins High School
- Johnson High School
- New Hampstead High School
- Saint Andrew's School
- St. Vincent's Academy
- Savannah Arts Academy
- Savannah Christian Preparatory School
- Savannah Country Day School
- Savannah High School
- Windsor Forest High School

The Oatland Island Wildlife Center of Savannah (Note: The Oatland Island Wildlife Center of Savannah was known as the Oatland Island Education Center until 2007.) is also a part of the Savannah-Chatham County Public Schools. An environmental education center, it serves thousands of students throughout the Southeastern United States. Located east of Savannah on a marsh island, it features a 2-mile (3.2 km) Native Animal Nature Trail that winds through maritime forests, salt marsh, and freshwater wetlands. Along the trail, visitors can observe native animals such as Florida panthers, Eastern timber wolves, and alligators in their natural habitat.

== Media ==
Savannah's major television stations are WSAV-TV, channel 3 (NBC, with The CW Plus and MyNetworkTV on DT2); WTOC-TV, channel 11 (CBS); WJCL, channel 22 (ABC); and WTGS, channel 28 (Fox). Two PBS member stations serve the city: WVAN (channel 9), part of Georgia Public Broadcasting; and WJWJ-TV (channel 16), part of SCETV.

The Georgia Gazette was the Georgia colony's first newspaper published in Savannah beginning April 7, 1763. Today the Savannah Morning News is Savannah's only remaining daily newspaper. It first appeared on January 15, 1850, as the Daily Morning News. The Savannah Tribune and the Savannah Herald are weekly newspapers focusing on the city's African-American community. Connect Savannah was a free weekly newspaper focused on local news, culture, and music. It ceased publication in 2024. The Coastal Buzz is the metro area's only media company dedicated to "positive news". It is owned and operated by Positive Life Media.

== Infrastructure ==
=== Transportation ===
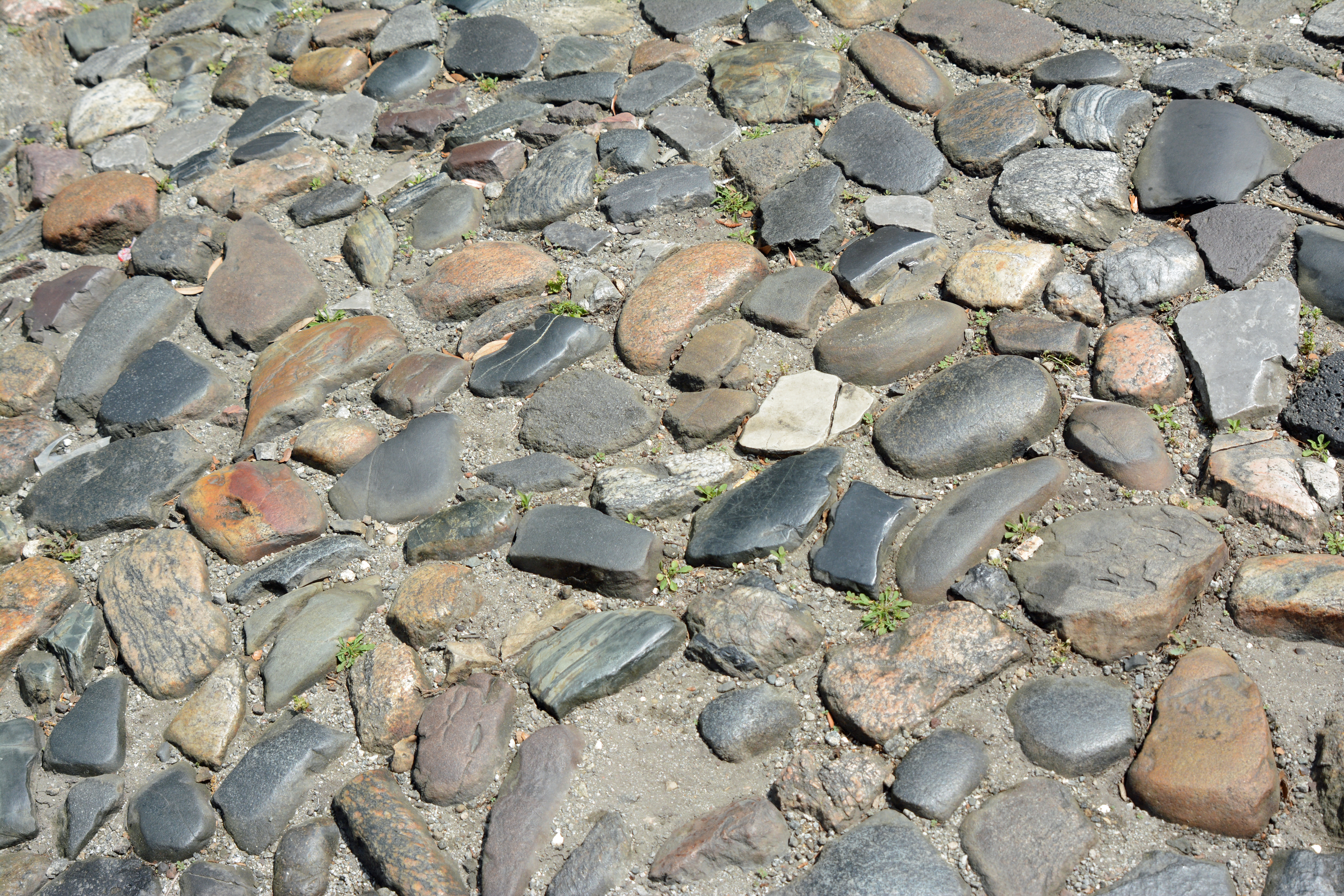
Old Savannah cobblestones, Historic District

Savannah/Hilton Head International Airport is located off Interstate 95 west of Savannah.

Amtrak operates a passenger terminal at Savannah for its Palmetto and Silver Service trains, which run between New York City and Miami. Two southbound and three northbound trains make daily stops at the Savannah terminal.

Public transit throughout the region is assured by Chatham Area Transit (CAT). There are 17 fixed routes, plus the CAT's dot (downtown transportation) system, which provides fare-free bus service on the Forsyth Loop and Downtown Loop, as well as free passage between River Street and Hutchinson Island via the Savannah Belles Ferry. The Georgia Queen and Savannah River Queen paddle steamers are also berthed on River Street.

The 211-mile (340 km) Georgia Hi–Lo Trail, established in 2024, will connect Savannah to Athens, Georgia, when completed.

==== Interstates and major highways ====
- Interstate 95 — Runs north–south just west of the city; provides access to Savannah/Hilton Head International Airport and intersects with Interstate 16, which leads into the city's center.
- Interstate 16 — Terminates in downtown Savannah at Liberty and Montgomery streets and intersects with Interstate 95 and Interstate 516.
- Interstate 516 — An urban perimeter highway connecting southside Savannah, at DeRenne Avenue, with the industrialized port area of the city to the north; intersects with the Veterans Parkway and Interstate 16 as well. Also known as Lynes Parkway.
- U.S. Route 80 (Victory Drive) — Runs east–west through midtown Savannah and connects the city with the town of Thunderbolt and the islands of Whitemarsh, Talahi, Wilmington and Tybee. It merges with the Islands Expressway and is the only means of reaching the Atlantic Ocean by automobile.
- U.S. Route 17 (Ocean Highway) — Runs north–south from Richmond Hill, through southside Savannah, into Garden City, back into west Savannah with a spur onto I-516, then I-16, and finally continuing over the Talmadge Memorial Bridge into South Carolina.
- Harry S. Truman Parkway — Runs through eastside Savannah, connecting the east end of downtown with southside neighborhoods. Construction began in 1990 and opened in phases (the last phase, connecting with Abercorn Street, was completed in 2014).
- Veterans Parkway — Links Interstate 516 and southside/midtown Savannah with southside Savannah and is intended to move traffic quicker from north–south by avoiding high-volume Abercorn Street. Also known as the Southwest Bypass.
- Islands Expressway — An extension of President Street to facilitate traffic moving between downtown Savannah, the barrier islands, and the beaches of Tybee Island.

=== Police and fire departments ===
In 2003, Savannah and Chatham County voted to merge their city and county police departments. The Savannah-Chatham Metropolitan Police Department was established on January 1, 2005, after the Savannah Police Department and Chatham County Police Department merged.

In February 2018, the city and county governments ended the police department merger. This reestablished both the Savannah Police Department and the Chatham County Police Department, and they now operate as two separate agencies. The departments have several specialty units, including K-9, SWAT, Bomb Squad, Marine Patrol, Dive, Air Support and Mounted Patrol. The 9-1-1 Communications Dispatch Center handles all 9-1-1 calls for service within the county and city, including fire and EMS. The Savannah Fire Department serves the City of Savannah, and there are separate municipal firefighting organizations elsewhere in Chatham County.

== Sister cities ==
Savannah's sister cities are:

- Batumi, Georgia
- Halle, Germany
- Jiujiang, China
- Kaya, Burkina Faso
- Patras, Greece

== See also ==
- USS Savannah, six ships
