= Abercorn Walk =

- Location: Savannah, Georgia, United States
- Coordinates: 32.025°N 81.111°W
- Opened: August 2005
- Developer: Edens and Avant
- Manager: Edens and Avant
- Owner: Edens and Avant
- Num. of stores: 13
- Num. of anchor tenants: 1
- Floor area: 70,000 sq ft (6,500 m^{2}) (GLA)
- Floors: 1
- Parking: 302 spaces
- Website: edensandavant.com/oc_center_siteplan.asp?cid=963

Abercorn Walk is an upscale shopping center on Abercorn Street in Savannah, Georgia. It is located near the city's more upscale midtown commercial sector. Abercorn Walk resembles a village in which each storefront retains a different style. Originally announced in 2003, Abercorn Walk was built atop a stretch of buildings that had been a church, a funeral home, a car lot and a house. The anchor store, which had been announced the previous year, was The Fresh Market. By the fall of 2004, several other tenants had joined the roster and signed letters of intent. As of 2023, major tenants besides The Fresh Market include Chico's, Francesca's Collections, J.Jill, JoS. A. Bank, LOFT, Talbots, White House Black Market, and Ethan Allen.

Abercorn Walk sits across the street from another upscale shopping center, Twelve Oaks du Marché, which opened in 1984 and has a horseshoe shape. This center, anchored by Publix, includes Cold Stone Creamery, Starbucks, and Bonefish Grill among many others. Many locally owned boutiques like Globe Shoe Company have suburban branches at Twelve Oaks. It is built of imitation "Savannah gray" brick and has a copper patina roof.
