= Hill Hall (Savannah State College) =

- Hill Hall at Savannah State College
- U.S. National Register of Historic Places
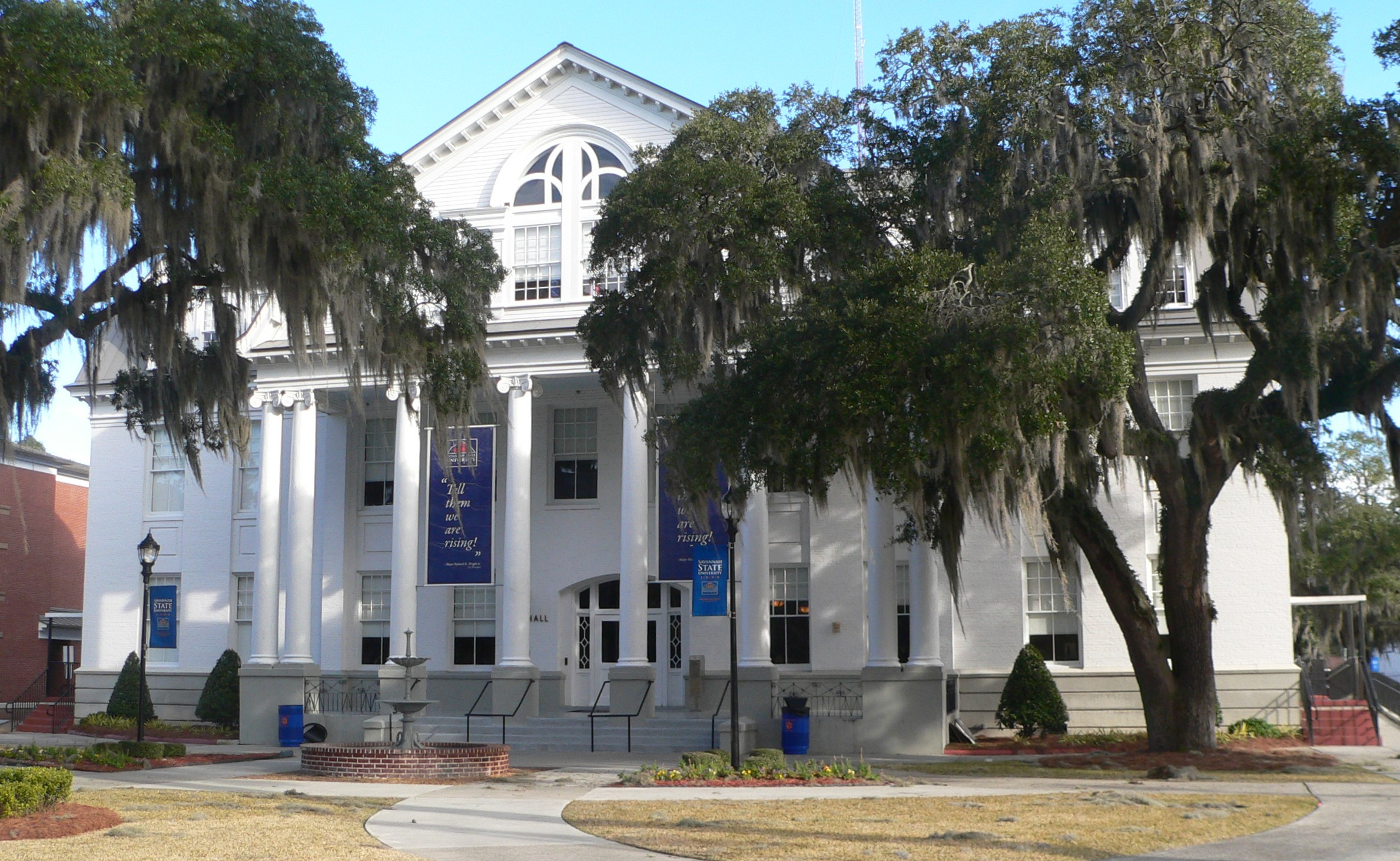

- Location within Georgia Location within the United States
- Nearest city: Savannah, Georgia
- Coordinates: 32.024053°N 81.056475°W
- Built: 1901
- Architectural style: Classical Revival
- NRHP reference No.: 81000197
- Added to NRHP: April 23, 1981

Hill Hall at Savannah State College, also known as Walter Bernard Hill Hall and built between 1900 and 1901 by students studying manual arts and blacksmithing, was added to the National Register of Historic Places in 1981. The building was named for Dr. Walter Barnard Hill.

== History ==
Located on the campus of Savannah State University, the facility had a variety of uses since its initial construction including a bookstore, student center, male dormitory, and library. U.S. President William Howard Taft visited the building in 1912. Between 1914 and 1918, during World War I, the building served as a barracks facility for Black soldiers as they trained in Savannah.

Hill Hall was closed in 1996 following protests by students when the building, a dorm at the time, fell into disrepair. For nearly 20 years campus officials and community groups worked to raise money for restoration. The building was damaged by fire on May 8, 2000 as work crews were completing renovations. The building was reopened in 2008.

Today, Hill Hall houses the university's Enrollment Management Center, a presidential suite, administrative offices, a lecture hall, a banquet room, and a mini-museum.

== Historical recognition ==
The Georgia Historical Commission and the Georgia Department of Natural Resources have recognized both the Savannah State campus and Hill Hall as a part of the Georgia Historical Marker Program. On April 26, 2001, a historic marker was erected by the Georgia Historical Society and the Savannah State University National Alumni Association. The Georgia Trust for Historic Preservation honored the Hill Hall Restoration project with its Excellence in Rehabilitation Award for 2009.
