= Abercorn Common =

- Abercorn Common logo
- Location: Savannah, Georgia, United States
- Coordinates: 32°0′7″N 81°7′24″W
- Opened: 1968
- Developer: Melaver, Inc.
- Manager: Melaver, Inc.
- Owner: Rosen equities LLC
- Num. of stores: 13
- Num. of anchor tenants: 3
- Floor area: 169,000 sq ft (15,700 m^{2}) (GLA)
- Floors: 1
- Website: abercorncommon.com

Abercorn Common is a 180,000-square-foot (17,000 m^{2}) shopping center in Savannah, Georgia. The center was the first retail center in the U.S. to become LEED-certified, meaning its design incorporates efficiency with attractive buildings and public spaces. The buildings and public spaces resemble Savannah's downtown historic district, with awnings, brick facades, fountains and brick-paved sidewalks. Palm trees, pampas grasses and willow trees are among the natural features. The shopping center dates back to the 1960s, when Abercorn Street was extended to form Abercorn Expressway. At the time, it was one of the first establishments on Savannah's southside, and now it forms the primary shopping corridor of Savannah. Located within several hundred feet are other major shopping centers, including: Oglethorpe Mall, Oglethorpe Plaza anchored by Best Buy and Kohl's, and Chatham Plaza anchored by World Market and Ross Dress For Less.

== History ==
Abercorn Common opened in 1968 as Abercorn Plaza. At a mere 38,000 square feet (3,500 m^{2}), the Southside Savannah shopping center would grow to nearly 169,000 square feet (15,700 m^{2}). The center was originally anchored by M&M (Melaver and Melaver) Supermarkets. In the 1970s, the center was expanded to include Sam Solomon and later Service Merchandise and Western Auto. In 1985 the M&M Supermarket chain was sold to Kroger, but the Melaver family retained ownership of the buildings. The Abercorn Plaza M&M closed in 1991 when the chain was entirely folded into Kroger. A larger store nearby replaced it. The store, vacant barely a year, was converted into Books-A-Million and Michael's in 1992. Service Merchandise was downsized in the early 2000s and was split into two units. Also in early 2000 Melaver Inc. returned to their sustainable roots. Sustainability in Savannah was nudged forth by Melaver when they renovated their downtown Whitaker Building and made it LEED-NC.

== LEED ==
Under the LEED program, Abercorn Plaza was enlarged into a more energy-efficient center. Using such features as reflective roofs, water conserving appliances (i.e. sinks and toilets) and the use of low-volatile organic compounds (VOC) (i.e., paints and sealants), the center became LEED silver-certified. There is also a cistern located behind the building that collects 5.5 million US gallons (21,000 m^{3}) of water retained from the roof and parking lot. The water is treated and used for irrigation purposes. Eighty-five percent of construction and demolition debris was recycled. In some cases old bricks became pavers engraved with names for a fee. The money was donated to The Coastal Georgia Land Trust and the Savannah Tree Foundation. The new center features front-end parking spaces reserved for hybrid-model cars only. McDonald's became LEED-Gold in September 2006 and is the first LEED McDonald's worldwide.

== Post 2006 Renovation ==
The project began in 2004 with the demolition of Service Merchandise, Western Auto and Beneficial. Neighboring car dealerships were also purchased and demolished, while salvaging all building materials. The land area gained became a triangle at the intersection of three streets: Abercorn Expressway, White Bluff Road and Fairmont Avenue. The remaining shopping center was remodeled. New buildings were constructed including a Circuit City and more general-lease areas. Shops 600 came on line in early 2007 and was certified LEED-Silver.
