= Greenwich Plantation =

Former plantation in Savannah, Georgia

- The Greenwich Plantation mansion, pictured circa 1910, about halfway through its existence. The fountain still stands today
- Interactive map of the Greenwich Plantation area
- Alternative names: Greenwich Place

General information
- Location: Colonial Savannah, Province of Georgia, Greenwich Road
- Coordinates: 32.0513°N 81.0396°W
- Completed: 1900 (mansion)
- Destroyed: 1923 (mansion)
- Owner: 1765–1777 Samuel Bowen; 1777–1797 Jane Bowen; 1797–18?? Samuel Beecroft; 18??–1874 Captain F. C. Threadcraft; 1874–1887 Savannah Schutzen Gesellschaft; 1887–1896 Greenwich Park Association; 1896–1917 Spencer Proudfoot Shotter; 1917–1923 Henry Norton Torrey

Technical details
- Floor count: 3

Other information
- Number of rooms: 40

Greenwich Plantation (also known as Greenwich Place) was a plantation founded in colonial Savannah, Province of Georgia, in 1765, on land now occupied by Greenwich Cemetery. The 100-acre (0.40 km^{2}) site included a plantation house (completed in 1900) and private cemetery, and was located on the Wilmington River, about 3.5 miles (6 kilometers) east of the Savannah colony. It was located immediately to the north of (and on the same bluff as) Bonaventure Plantation, which existed until 1868 on land now occupied by Bonaventure Cemetery. Its mile-long driveway still exists to the left of Bonaventure's main gates.

== History ==
The plantation was established in April 1765 by Samuel Bowen, who bought 450 acres (1.8 km^{2}) of land in Thunderbolt, which he named Greenwich. On his new estate, Bowen began to grow soya beans, then known as "Luk Taw" or "Chinese vetch", from which he made soy sauce and vermicelli noodles. He suspected that the sprouts of his plants had antiscorbutic properties that would be of use to the British Royal Navy in their fight against scurvy, research that led to his receiving a gold medal from the Society for the Encouragement of Arts, Manufactures and Commerce in 1766 and a gift of £200 from George III. The following year, Bowen received a patent from the British government for his "new invented method of preparing and making sago, vermicelli and soy from plants growing in America, to be equal in goodness to those made in the East Indies". According to the 1805 The American Universal Geography, Bowen also introduced tea from China to Georgia. These activities likely brought Bowen to the attention of the American Philosophical Society in Philadelphia, which elected him to membership in 1769.

Upon his death in 1777, ownership transferred to Bowen's wife, Jane, daughter of Savannah customs collector William Spencer. She hosted two officers from the fleet of Charles Hector, comte d'Estaing, at Greenwich during the Second Battle of Savannah. She supervised the burial of Polish general Casimir Pulaski, who was killed during the battle, "between her mansion and the river".

Jeanie Bowen sold the plantation in 1797 to her daughter's new husband, British army surgeon Samuel Beecroft.

The next known owner was Captain F. C. Threadcraft, who lived on the plantation until 1874, at which point it was taken over by Savannah Schutzen Gesellschaft, a German rifle club.

Greenwich Park Association became the new owners in 1887, and its director, Canadian-born Spencer Proudfoot Shotter, a naval-stores magnate, bought it outright in 1896. (Shotter also owned Shadowbrook in the Berkshires of Massachusetts between 1905 and 1912, but was still a resident of Savannah.) In 1898, Shotter began building a Beaux-Arts mansion which had double colonnades, 28 columns on three sides, each measuring 28 inches in diameter and more than twenty feet tall. Designed partly by Carrère and Hastings and partly by Ingle and Almirall, the mansion had extensive gardens containing expanses of lawn, boxwood hedges, imported plants and decorative pools. He renamed the location Greenwich Place. Shotter lost his fortunes (and was jailed for three months) after becoming embroiled in an anti-trust lawsuit and sold the property to Dr. Henry Norton Torrey, a brain surgeon from Detroit. Torrey was the owner between 1917 and 1923 and wintered there with his wife, Nell, and two children, William (1911–1958) and Eleanor (1913–2021), as well as eighteen members of service staff.

At the time of the Torreys' purchase of Greenwich Place, it had "an elaborately furnished main house, a six-car garage, a laundry building, a superintendent's office and cottage, a gate lodge, a chauffeur's cottage, other servants' quarters, an artificial pond, and formal gardens." It also contained "a ballroom, library, billiards room, reception room, drawing room, music room, butler's pantry, refrigeration pantry, twelve master bedrooms and ten baths." Outside there were stables (which are still visible), a dairy farm, a 200-foot-long greenhouse (at the western edge of the mansion), a bath and pool house, and a yacht dock. It was said to have rivaled the Vanderbilts' Biltmore Estate in Asheville, North Carolina, as the most opulent in the South.

The house and grounds were used in several silent films, including Mice and Men (1916) and Stolen Moments (1920).

On January 27, 1923, the three-storey, 40-room brick and marble plantation mansion burned to the ground. A ten-year-old Eleanor jumped from the second floor to escape, and Dr. Torrey had to rescue his grandmother, Mrs. M. T. Garrison. Instead of rebuilding, the family moved to Ossabaw Island, where they built a house between 1924 and 1926, taking with them the two large iron gates from Greenwich Place.

In 1933, the City of Savannah purchased the land that the plantation once occupied for $75,000 and named it the "Greenwich Addition to Bonaventure". With it came fourteen of Shotter's statues, which he bought during a trip to Rome in 1912 and which arrived by boat in Savannah that July. The city placed them in storage, where they remained until 1965, at which point they were loaned to Savannah's Telfair Museums.

In 2020, the City approved the sale of the statues, with a collective price tag of $400,000. One item was kept because it was part of a set of two, the other part being on display at Telfair.

The original fountain at Greenwich still exists, marking the former location of the mansion, as does the butterfly lake, which was traversed by an arched bridge.

== Bibliography ==
- Hymowitz, T.; Harlan, J. R. (1983). "Introduction of soybean to North America by Samuel Bowen in 1765". Economic Botany. 37 (4): 371–79. doi:10.1007/BF02904196. JSTOR 4254529. S2CID 12722841.
- Chaplin, Joyce E. (1996). An Anxious Pursuit: Agricultural Innovation and Modernity in the Lower South, 1730–1815. University of North Carolina Press. ISBN 978-0807-8461-31.
- Morse, Jedidiah; Arrowsmith, Aaron; Lewis, Samuel (1805). The American Universal Geography, Or: A View of the Present State of All the Empires, Kingdoms, States, and Republicks in the Known World, and of the United States of America in Particular. Vol. I. J.T. Buckingham.
