= Jane Bowen =

- Born: c. 1737
- Died: 18 October 1781 (aged 43–44)
- Known for: Aiding officers during the siege of Savannah
- Spouse: Samuel Bowen (m. 1765–1777; his death)

Jane Bowen (née Spencer; c. 1737 – 18 October 1781) was an English woman who became known for assisting overseas officers working in support of the American cause during the Revolutionary War. She also supervised the burial of Polish general Casimir Pulaski, who was killed in the 1779 siege of Savannah.

== Early life ==
Jane "Jeanie" Spencer was born c. 1737, probably in London, to William Spencer (died 1776), a customs collector in Savannah, Province of Georgia, and Elizabeth Spencer. Her parents divorced; his father remarried, around January 1745, to a daughter of Joseph Avery.

== Siege of Savannah ==
Two years after the death of her husband, Bowen hosted two officers from the fleet of Charles Hector, comte d'Estaing, at Greenwich Plantation in Thunderbolt, Province of Georgia, during the 1779 siege of Savannah. She also supervised the burial of Polish general Casimir Pulaski, who was killed during the battle, "between her mansion and the river", although Pulaski's resting place is disputed (some claim he was buried at sea or in Charleston, South Carolina).

== Personal life ==
On 30 March 1765, Spencer married English farmer and entrepreneur Samuel Bowen, who established Greenwich Plantation in 1765. After Bowen's death in 1777, she assumed control of the plantation. The couple had four children. Daughter Elizabeth Ann (1766–1816) married British army surgeon Samuel Beecroft, to whom Jane sold the plantation in 1797. Elizabeth placed flowers at Pulaski's grave until her death in 1816.

== Death ==
Upon her death in 1781, aged 43 or 44, Bowen bequeathed her four children 26 slaves, 15 cows, and two oxen, along with a variety of machines for the processing of sago.

== Bibliography ==
- Hymowitz, T.; Harlan, J. R. (1983). "Introduction of soybean to North America by Samuel Bowen in 1765". Economic Botany. 37 (4): 371–79. Bibcode:1983EcBot..37..371H. doi:10.1007/BF02904196. JSTOR 4254529. S2CID 12722841.
- Szczygielski, Wacław (1986). "Pułaski Kazimierz". Polski Słownik Biograficzny, Tom XXIX (in Polish). Zakład Narodowy Imenia Ossolińskich I Wydawnictwo Polskieh Akademii Nauk. p. 386. ISBN 83-04-00148-9.
