= Tyringham Library =

- U.S. National Register of Historic Places
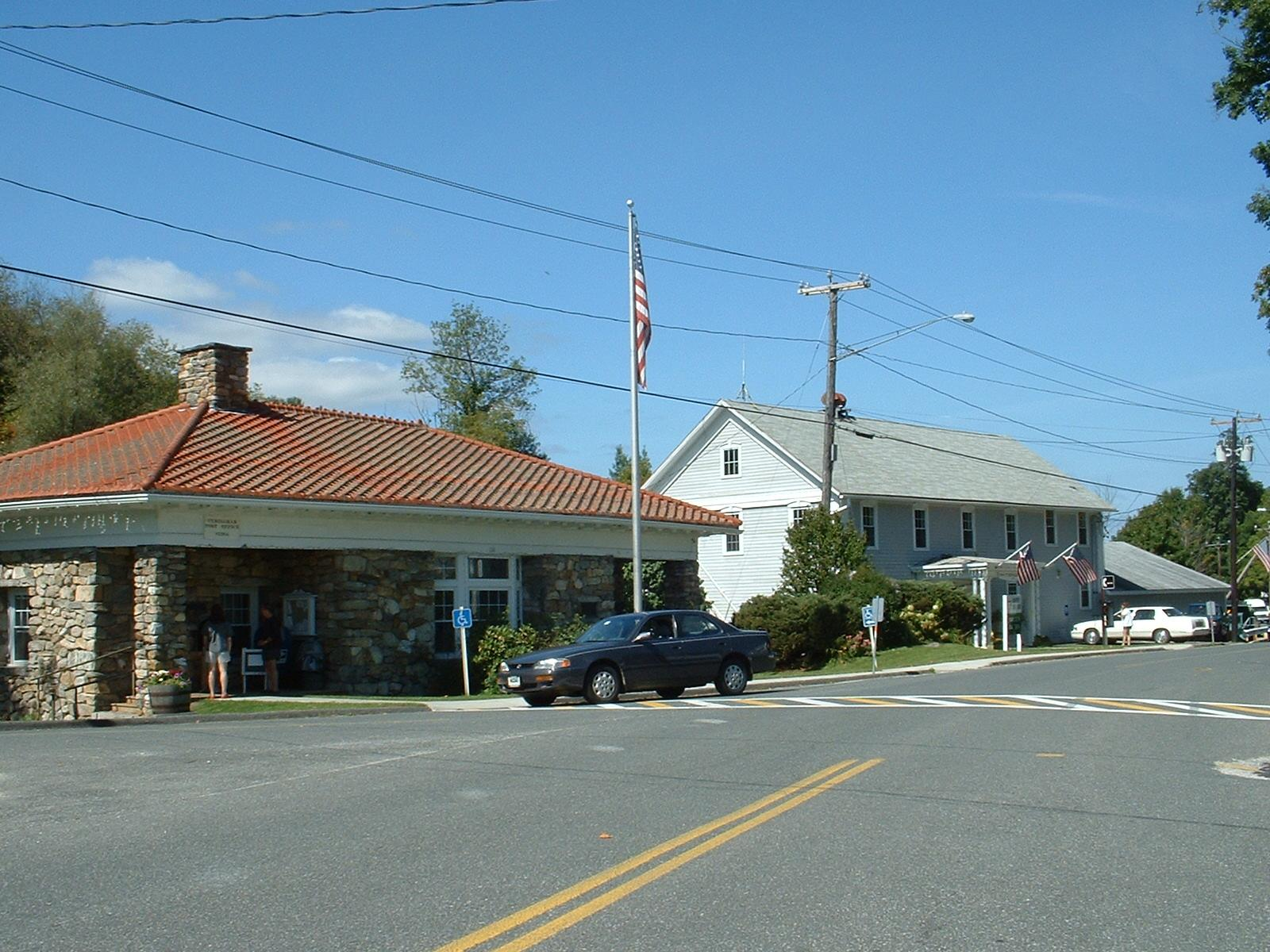
- Library/post office (left) and town offices (right)

- Location within Massachusetts Location within the United States
- Location: 118 Main Rd., Tyringham, Massachusetts
- Coordinates: 42°14′45″N 73°12′15″W
- Area: less than one acre
- Built: 1905
- Architect: H. Neill Wilson
- NRHP reference No.: 100001960
- Added to NRHP: January 11, 2018

The Tyringham Library is a historic public building at 118 Main Road in Tyringham, Massachusetts. Completed in 1905, it is one of the small town's few buildings exhibiting architectural sophistication, in this case the Arts and Crafts style. The building currently houses both the library and the town post office. It was listed on the National Register of Historic Places in 2018.

== Description and history ==
The Tyringham Library occupies a prominent position in the small town center, at the western corner of Main and Jerusalem Roads. It is a single-story masonry structure, built out of rough-cut fieldstone and covered by a hip roof finished in terra cotta tiles. A large square fieldstone chimney rises from the roof peak. The main entrances are set in corner recesses, a stone post supporting the roof corners. A wooden entablature encircles the building below the roof line. The building interior is functionally divided so that one third now houses the post office, and the other two thirds house the library. The library retains many original finishes and furnishings, including a large fireplace, window seats, handmade oak shelving, and Mission style seating.

Prior to construction of this building, Tyringham's library was essentially transitory in nature, although the town did pay its librarian a small stipend. John Scott, a transplant from Brooklyn, New York whose family had long summered in the town, became the librarian in 1902, and he and John Scott, another prominent local resident, spearheaded the drive for a permanent home for the library. Drawings for the building were prepared by the noted Pittsfield architect H. Neill Wilson, and it was completed in 1905. Its design, probably the first architect-designed building in the town, is stylistically reminiscent of Shadowbrook, one of Wilson's major commissions, but on a significantly smaller scale.

When opened, the building housed the library and town offices. In 1973, the office space was repurposed for use by the post office.

== See also ==
- National Register of Historic Places listings in Berkshire County, Massachusetts
