= Wollison–Shipton Building =

- U.S. National Register of Historic Places
- U.S. Historic district – Contributing property
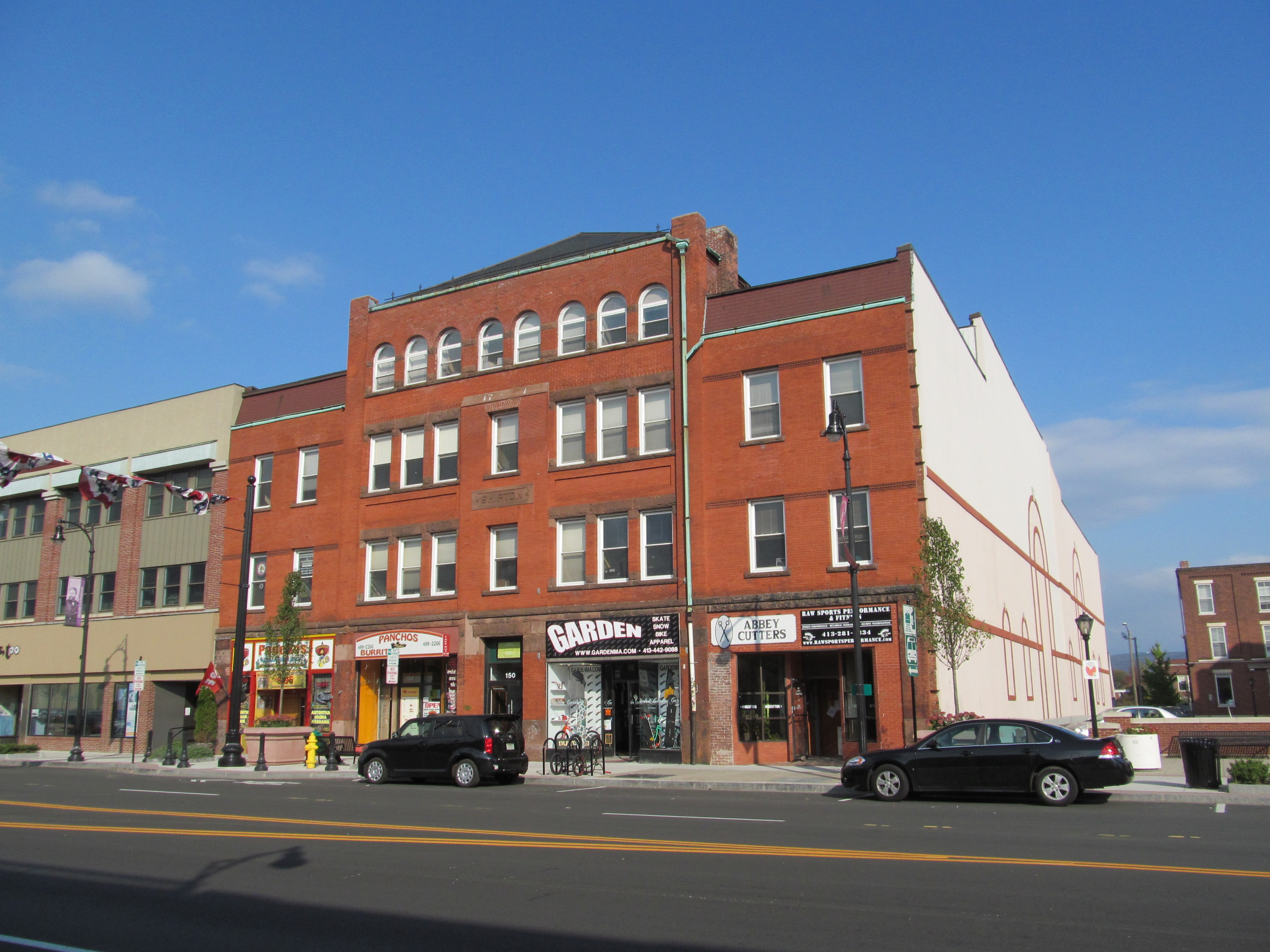

- Location within Massachusetts Location within the United States
- Location: 142-156 North St., Pittsfield, Massachusetts
- Coordinates: 42°27′2″N 73°15′12″W
- Built: c. 1887
- Built by: Munyon, D. C.
- Architect: Wilson, H. Neil
- Architectural style: Late Victorian
- Part of: Park Square Historic District (ID75001911)
- NRHP reference No.: 82001899

Significant dates
- Added to NRHP: September 30, 1982
- Designated CP: December 23, 1991

The Wollison–Shipton Building is a historic commercial block located at 142-156 North Street in Pittsfield, Massachusetts. Designed by architect H. Neil Wilson, it was built in 1888 when the area north of Park Square developed as a commercial and retail part of downtown Pittsfield.

== Description and history ==
The building stands in downtown Pittsfield, on the east side of North Street, roughly midway between Fenn and Eagle Streets. It is a four-story steel and masonry structure, built out of Philadelphia pressed red brick with rusticated brownstone trim. It has a central full-height section, seven bays wide, capped by a hip roof, which has flanking three-story mansarded wings. The ground floor has four storefronts, two on either side of the main building entrance, each now redone with modern plate glass display windows flanking recessed entrances. A belt course of sandstone separates the first and second floors, and brick pilasters separate the middle seven bays from the outer ones. Windows are rectangular sash, except for the central fourth-floor windows, where eight are set in round-arch openings. Windows in the outermost two bays on each side have stone sills, and are topped by a course of brickwork that extends across the width of the outer sections. In the central sections, the outer windows are grouped in threes, each individually topped by stone sills.

At the time of its construction in 1888, this building was relative rarity for the type of brick used and for its cast iron detailing, which has since been removed. The second floor was the second home for the local YMCA. The architect was H. Neill Wilson, a prominent local architect, and the builder was D.C. Munyan, who was responsible for the construction of a number of other nearby buildings, including the adjacent Academy of Music (burned 1912), the Berkshire County Courthouse, and the Berkshire Athenaeum, both prominent structures on Park Square.

The building was listed on the National Register of Historic Places on September 30, 1982, and was included in an expansion of the Park Square Historic District in 1991.

== See also ==
- National Register of Historic Places listings in Berkshire County, Massachusetts
- Upper North Street Commercial District
