= Eleanor Torrey West =

American historian

- Born: January 17, 1913; Detroit, Michigan, U.S.
- Died: January 17, 2021 (aged 108); Garden City, Georgia, U.S.
- Occupation: Preservationist
- Parent(s): Henry Norton Torrey; Nell Ford

Eleanor Torrey "Sandy" West (January 17, 1913 – January 17, 2021) was an American preservationist. She became the owner of Ossabaw Island, Georgia, and was its longest inhabitant at the time of her death. In 1978, sitting United States President Jimmy Carter stipulated that the island was to become Georgia's first heritage preserve.

== Early life ==
Eleanor Torrey was born in Detroit, Michigan, early in the new year of 1913, to Henry Norton Torrey, a brain surgeon, and Nell Ford. She was their second child, after William (Ford), born two years earlier.

When Eleanor was aged four, her father purchased Greenwich Place in Thunderbolt, Georgia. The family wintered there over the next six years. At the time of the Torreys' purchase of Greenwich Place, it had "an elaborately furnished main house, a six-car garage, a laundry building, a superintendent's office and cottage, a gate lodge, a chauffeur's cottage, other servants' quarters, an artificial pond, and formal gardens." It also contained "a ballroom, library, billiards room, reception room, drawing room, music room, butler's pantry, refrigeration pantry, twelve master bedrooms and ten baths." Outside there were stables (which are still visible), a dairy farm, a 200-foot-long greenhouse (at the western edge of the mansion), a bath and pool house, and a yacht dock. It was said to have rivaled the Vanderbilts' Biltmore Estate in Asheville, North Carolina, as the most opulent in the South. The house and grounds were used in several silent films, including Mice and Men (1916) and Stolen Moments (1920). The estate was destroyed in a fire on January 27, 1923. A ten-year-old Eleanor jumped from the second floor to escape, and Dr. Torrey had to rescue his grandmother, Mrs. M. T. Garrison. Instead of rebuilding, the family moved to Ossabaw Island, where they built a house between 1924 and 1926, taking with them the two large iron gates from Greenwich Place.

== Personal life ==
West attended the Masters School in Dobbs Ferry, New York.

She married twice: firstly to John Shallcross, then to Clifford Bateman West, an artist. Between the two marriages, she had four children.

West's father died in 1945, followed thirteen years later by her mother (with her brother in between). They were buried in Woodlawn Cemetery in their native Detroit. In 1960, West and her nieces and nephews inherited Ossabaw Island.

In 1961, West and her husband created The Ossabaw Foundation.

West and her family sold Ossabaw Island in 1978 to the State of Georgia for $8 million, half its assessed value, assuring the island would be maintained as a heritage preserve.

== Death ==
West died on January 17, 2021, her 108th birthday. She was visiting a friend Garden City, Georgia, when she died, having moved to an assisted-living facility in Savannah, Georgia, five years earlier.
