= Henry Norton Torrey =

American physician (1880–1945)

- Born: October 7, 1880; Creston, Iowa, U.S.
- Died: December 29, 1945 (aged 65); Grosse Point, Michigan, U.S.
- Resting place: Woodlawn Cemetery, Detroit, Michigan, U.S.
- Education: University of Michigan; Johns Hopkins University
- Occupation: Physician
- Spouse: Nell Ford (m. 1909–1945; his death)

Henry Norton Torrey (October 7, 1880 – December 29, 1945) was an American physician. He was eminent in Detroit, Michigan.

== Life and career ==
Torrey was born in 1880 in Creston, Iowa, to Dr. Bartlett Norton Torrey and Flora Reed. He studied at Knox College at the University of Michigan and Johns Hopkins University.

In 1906, he moved Detroit to practice medicine. Three years later, he married Eleanor (Nell) Blanche Ford, daughter of John B. Ford, with whom he had two children: William (Ford) in 1911 and Eleanor two years later.

During World War I, he served as a Major in the United States Army Medical Corps. He then became a surgeon and administrator at Detroit's Harper Hospital.

In 1915, Torrey purchased Greenwich Place in Thunderbolt, Georgia, from Spencer Shotter. The family wintered there over the next six years. At the time of the Torreys' purchase of Greenwich Place, it had "an elaborately furnished main house, a six-car garage, a laundry building, a superintendent's office and cottage, a gate lodge, a chauffeur's cottage, other servants' quarters, an artificial pond, and formal gardens." It also contained "a ballroom, library, billiards room, reception room, drawing room, music room, butler's pantry, refrigeration pantry, twelve master bedrooms and ten baths." Outside there were stables (which are still visible), a dairy farm, a 200-foot-long greenhouse (at the western edge of the mansion), a bath and pool house, and a yacht dock. It was said to have rivaled the Vanderbilts' Biltmore Estate in Asheville, North Carolina, as the most opulent in the South. The house and grounds were used in several silent films, including Mice and Men (1916) and Stolen Moments (1920). The estate was destroyed in a fire on January 27, 1923. A ten-year-old Eleanor jumped from the second floor to escape, and Dr. Torrey had to rescue his grandmother, Mrs. M. T. Garrison. Instead of rebuilding, the family moved to Ossabaw Island, where they built a house between 1924 and 1926, taking with them the two large iron gates from Greenwich Place.

In 1926, Torrey wrote The Story of Ossabaw.

== Death ==
Torrey died in 1945, aged 65. He was interred in Detroit's Woodlawn Cemetery. His widow survived him by thirteen years and was buried beside Torrey.
