= Spencer Proudfoot Shotter =

Canadian businessman (1855–1920)

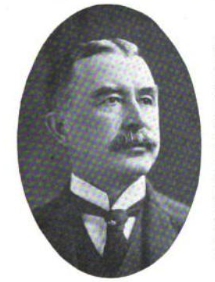
- Born: 1855; Wellington County, Canada West
- Died: December 5, 1920 (aged 64–65)
- Occupation: Businessman
- Known for: Chairman of the American Naval Stores Company; Greenwich Plantation

Spencer Proudfoot Shotter (1855 – December 5, 1920) was a Canadian businessman. A naval-stores magnate, he purchased Greenwich Plantation in Thunderbolt, Georgia, and renamed it Greenwich Place. The site is now occupied by Greenwich Cemetery.

== Early life ==
Shotter was born in Wellington County, Canada West, in 1855, to Spencer Lough Shotter and Mary Proudfoot. His father was a native of Kent, England. Shotter was a grandnephew of William Proudfoot, a Canadian politician.

== Career ==
He began his career around 1885 in Wilmington, North Carolina, but made his fortune after moving south to Savannah, Georgia, by processing the wood from Georgia's pine forests to make turpentine, used in shipbuilding. He established the American Naval Stores Company, which led to the creation of enough jobs to assist in Savannah's exit from the post-Civil War depression.

In 1909, Shotter lost his fortunes, and was jailed for three months, after becoming embroiled in an antitrust lawsuit. The United States Supreme Court decided in the defendants' favor on June 9, 1913, reversing an earlier judgment.

== Personal life ==
Shotter married Isabelle Eagle Davis, daughter of George Davis, in 1881. She died a year later, shortly after the birth of daughter Isabel, the couple's only child. He remarried, to Elizabeth Wallace Owens (whose grandfather, George Welshman Owens, owned Savannah's Owens–Thomas House), and had four more children: daughters Elizabeth (1886), Eleanor (1888) and Mary (1891), and son Spencer Owens (1892).

In 1898, two years after purchasing Greenwich Plantation, he built an opulent Beaux-Arts mansion, said in several publications to have rivaled the Vanderbilts' Biltmore Estate. It had double colonnades, twenty-eight columns on three sides, each measuring twenty-eight inches in diameter and more than twenty feet tall. It had extensive gardens containing expanses of lawn, boxwood hedges, imported plants, and decorative pools. He renamed the location Greenwich Place. The mansion stood until 1923, at which point it burned down.

Shotter also owned Shadow Brook in the Berkshires of Massachusetts between 1905 and 1912, but was still a resident of Savannah.

In 1917, he sold Greenwich Place to Dr. Henry Norton Torrey, a brain surgeon from Detroit.

Shotter was a member of the Chatham Hunt Club, alongside Mills B. Lane Sr, and of the Georgia Historical Society.

== Death ==
Shotter died in his sleep on December 5, 1920, aged 64 or 65. He had been visiting daughter Isabel in New York City, and was staying at the Hotel La Salle. After a funeral service at Savannah's Christ Church, he was interred in Bonavanture Cemetery. His second wife and two of their children, Elizabeth and Isabel, were also buried in Bonaventure upon their deaths in 1935, 1956, and 1966, respectively.

Shotter's mother, a native of Scotland, preceded him in death by six months. She lived to the age of 90, and was socially active until her death.

== Popular culture ==
Shotter is mentioned in John Berendt's book Midnight in the Garden of Good and Evil (1994). Berendt states Shotter is a forebear of Savannah district attorney Spencer Lawton, before describing Greenwich Place.
