= Cannabis in Algeria =

- Location of Algeria (dark green)
- Medicinal: Legal
- Recreational: Illegal

Cannabis in Algeria is mostly illegal, although widely consumed. Under Law No. 04-18 13 Dhou El Kaada 1425 (25 December 2004), and enforcement decree No. 07-228 15 Rajab 1428 (July 30, 2007), cultivation, commerce, and possession are forbidden, except for medical purposes, subject to prior authorization by the Minister of Health.

== History ==
Cannabis is believed to have been introduced to Algeria by the Arab invasions of the 9th through 12th centuries.

Cannabis use in Algeria also played a role in spreading the habit to France, following France's 1830 occupation of Algeria. Dr. Jacques-Joseph Moreau observed the effects of cannabis in Algeria in the form of an edible called dawamesc, and it was this drug that he introduced to Paris' Club des Hashischins.

In 1854, John Morell wrote of his travels in Algeria:

In Algeria they apply the names of kif, of hachich, and sometimes of tekrouri, to the extremity of the stem of the hemp, including the leaves, the flowers, and the seed, sometimes smoked by the natives in very diminutive pipes. These smokers are mostly inhabitants of the towns and villages, and are rarely met with among the Bedouins.

Cannabis was first prohibited under French rule with the decrees of September 14, 1916 and February 9, 1917.

== Recent developments ==
As of the 2020s, Algeria maintains a strict prohibitionist stance on cannabis. Despite widespread underground use—particularly of hashish—there have been no legislative moves toward decriminalization or legalization. In March 2025, Algerian authorities seized over 3,000 kilograms of cannabis during a large anti-smuggling operation near the Moroccan border. Unlike neighboring Morocco, which legalized medical cannabis in 2021, Algeria continues to ban all cannabis-related products, including CBD and industrial hemp. Enforcement remains active and severe in trafficking cases, though anecdotal reports suggest some leniency for small-scale personal use in urban areas.
