= William Proudfoot =

Canadian politician

William Proudfoot

William Proudfoot, KC (February 21, 1859 – December 3, 1922) was an Ontario politician and barrister.

He was born in Colborne Township, Huron County, Canada West, the son of Robert Proudfoot, an immigrant from Scotland. He was educated in Goderich, studied law at Osgoode Hall and was called to the bar in 1880. Proudfoot set up practice in Goderich. He married Marion F. Dickson in 1886. In 1902, he was named King's Counsel.

In 1908 he was elected to the Legislative Assembly of Ontario as a Liberal. He was re-elected in 1911 and 1914. In 1917, he was chosen leader of the Ontario Liberal Party and, as such, became Leader of the Opposition in the legislature. Proudfoot was challenged as Liberal leader at the party's party's first leadership convention in June 1919 and was replaced by Hartley Dewart. The 1919 election saw the Liberals and their allies drop from 30 seats to 27 with Proudfoot himself defeated in his riding of Huron Centre by the Labour candidate. No doubt due to Newton Rowell's influence, he was then appointed to the Senate of Canada where he sat until his death in 1922.

Proudfoot's grandnephew was Spencer Proudfoot Shotter, founder of what became the American Naval Stores Company.

Party political offices
| Preceded by Newton Rowell | Ontario Liberal leaders 1918–1919 | Succeeded by Hartley Dewart |
