= Saint Augustine Creek =

Stream in Georgia, U.S.

Coordinates: 32°10′08″N 81°09′25″W

Saint Augustine Creek is a stream in the U.S. state of Georgia. It is a tributary to the Savannah River. It should not be confused with the original name of the Wilmington River on Georgia's coast.

A variant name is "Augustine Creek". (Saint) Augustine Creek was named after Walter Augustine, an 18th-century landholder and proprietor of a sawmill along its course.
