= Wirt Dexter Walker =

American lawyer

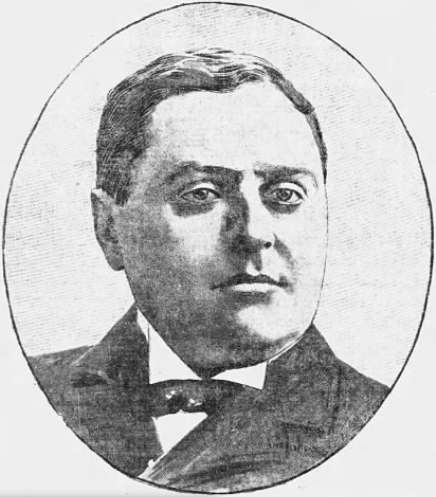
- Born: September 1, 1860; Chicago, Illinois
- Died: April 24, 1899 (aged 38); New York, New York
- Burial place: Graceland Cemetery
- Education: Yale University
- Occupation: Lawyer
- Spouse: Marie Winston (m. 1894)

Wirt Dexter Walker (September 1, 1860 – April 24, 1899) was a Chicago lawyer. He was the son of successful Chicago attorney James M. Walker and Eliza M. Walker, and was named after Wirt Dexter, the junior partner at his father's firm, Walter VanArman & Dexter.

== Biography ==
Wirt Dexter Walker was born in Chicago on September 1, 1860.

After his graduation from Yale University he inherited a large sum of money upon his father's death. He began his own practice in 1883, and was secretary of the University Club of Chicago in 1887. He had health problems and became blind, at which point he retired from office work to travel.

He married Marie Winston in 1894.

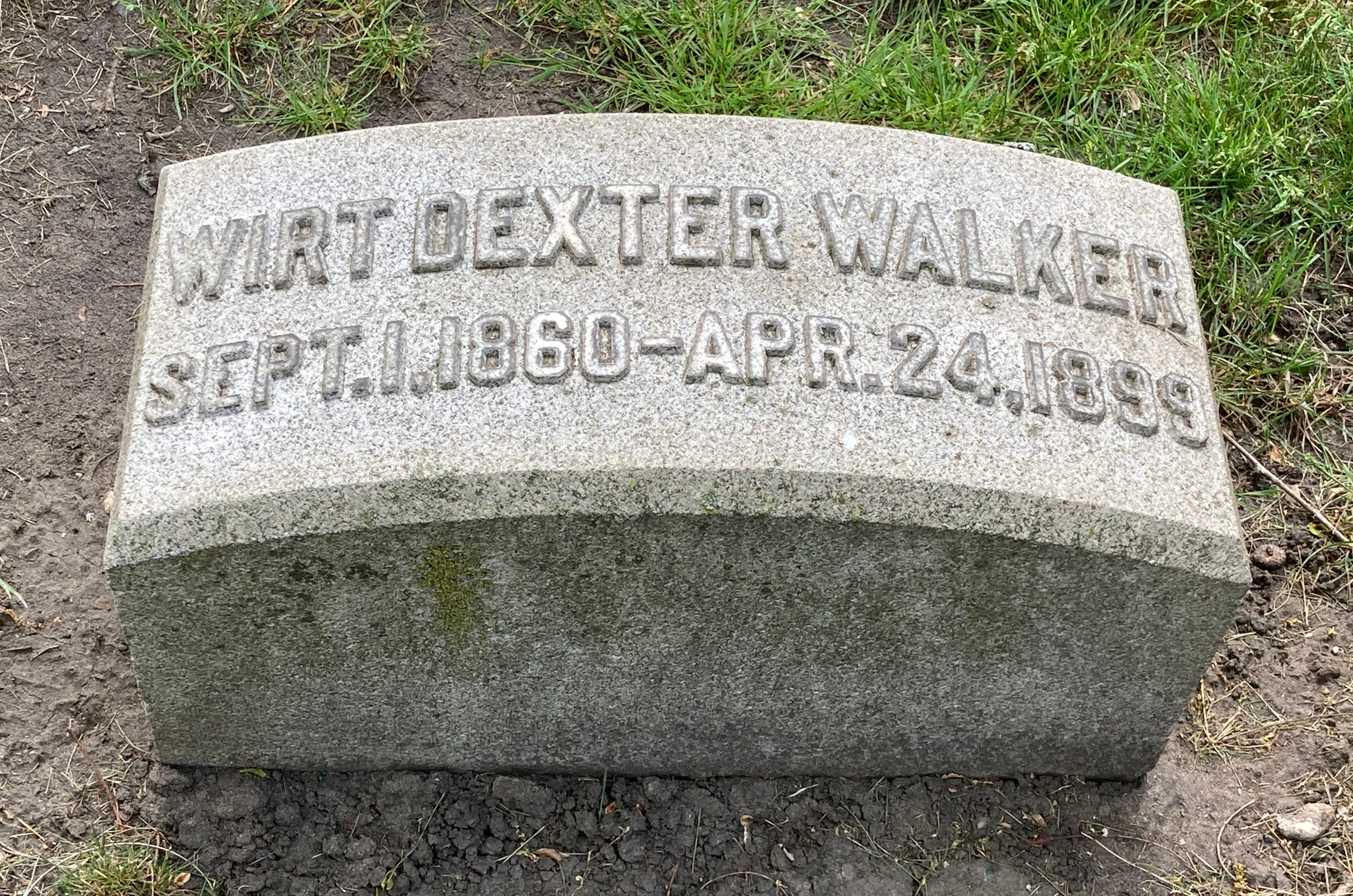
Walker's grave at Graceland Cemetery

He died at the Waldorf Astoria in New York City on April 24, 1899. He was buried at Graceland Cemetery in Chicago.

== Blythewood Farms summer cottage ==
He purchased land in the Berkshire County in 1888 and hired local architect H. Neill Wilson to design a large summer cottage retreat in 1890, hoping a residence in the area would help his health improve. Blythewood was constructed, but Walker died a year later leaving no children. Wilson went on to design several other mansions for wealthy persons establishing summer retreats in the area, including Shadowbrook.

His wife was left with a $15,000 annual inheritance and the Blythewood "cottage" on 450 acres (1.8 km^{2}) after his death. Speculation on whether she would lose the income was reported in newspapers as she prepared to marry another lawyer, Victor Elting. She did not lose her income, but the property went to Wirt D. Dexter Art Gallery in Chicago whose trustees "sold it in 1905 to a Chicago tycoon, John Alden Spoor". Spoor was chairman of the board of the Union Stockyards and Transit Company in Chicago, and sold Blythewood to a group of local investors two years before his death in 1926.
