= Francis X. Shea =

Francis Xavier "Frank" Shea (1926–July 9, 1977) was an American Jesuit priest and educator who served as president of the College of St. Scholastica and, after leaving the Jesuit order, as chancellor of Antioch College.

== Biography ==
Francis X. Shea was born in the Dorchester section of Boston, Massachusetts, in 1926. He attended the old Boston College High School in Boston's South End, graduating in 1943. Shortly after graduation, in July 1943, he entered the Jesuits and began several years of training and study at the Shadowbrook novitiate in Stockbridge, Massachusetts, and at the Weston Jesuit School of Theology in the Boston area. He acquired his first experience as an educator at St. George's College in Jamaica, where he taught high school from 1950 to 1953.

Following additional study of theology at Weston, Shea was ordained as a priest in 1956. In 1958 he began graduate studies in English literature at the University of Minnesota, which awarded him a Ph.D. in 1961. After receiving his Ph.D., he was again assigned to St. George's College, where he taught until 1963.

In 1963, Shea was assigned to teach 19th and 20th-century English literature at Boston College. As a faculty member at Boston College, Shea was popular with students and was active in civil rights initiatives. He participated in a march from Selma to Montgomery, Alabama, with Martin Luther King Jr., in 1965, and was involved in the Upward Bound program. In December 1968, he became Boston College's first executive vice president. In that position, he is remembered as an enthusiastic innovator whose effectiveness was sometimes diminished by his lack of administrative experience.

Shea left Boston College in 1971 to go to Duluth, Minnesota, where he became president of the College of St. Scholastica, a Roman Catholic women's college that had recently become coeducational. He was the first male and the first non-Benedictine to serve as the school's president. In four years there, he oversaw the building of dormitories; the establishment of intercollegiate athletics, including men's hockey; and several additions to the curriculum, including academic programs in American Indian studies, physical therapy, and media studies. In the spring when smelt were running, he invited the college community to his home on the shore of Lake Superior for a fish fry, beginning a school tradition of a spring celebration known as Mayfest.

In 1974 Shea resigned both his position at St. Scholastica and his priesthood to marry Susan Gussenhoven, a physicist, then at Boston College, whom he had met when both were graduate students. Although he resigned his priesthood, he did not leave Roman Catholicism. He moved to Ohio to become chancellor of Antioch College. He presided over Antioch during a period of financial difficulties and other disarray at the school. Describing the school as he found it, he said: "The entire administration has levitated out of sight, departed, or become otherwise incapacitated or unavailable."

Shea served three years at Antioch, resigning June 30, 1977. He died a few days thereafter, on July 9, 1977, from a massive heart attack.

== Works ==
After his ordination in 1956, Shea wrote a book-length manuscript account of the history of the Shadowbrook mansion in Stockbridge, Massachusetts, that housed the Shadowbrook novitiate, culminating in its destruction by fire in 1956. His story was structured on the model of A Night to Remember, an account of the sinking of the Titanic written by Walter Lord. Shea's book was published posthumously in 2009 by the Society of Jesus as The Shadowbrook Fire (Elephant Tree Press, Watertown, Massachusetts). Years earlier, Shea had told friends that Jesuit administrators had deemed his work to be "too frank" and to reflect badly on their community.

== Legacy ==
An annual lectureship, the Francis X. Shea Memorial Lecture, was established at St. Scholastica in his memory. Shea's widow, Susan Gussenhoven Shea, has donated forest land in Corinth, Vermont, to the town for establishment of a town forest to be named the "F.X. Shea Forest" in his honor.
