= Glendale Police Station =

- U.S. National Register of Historic Places
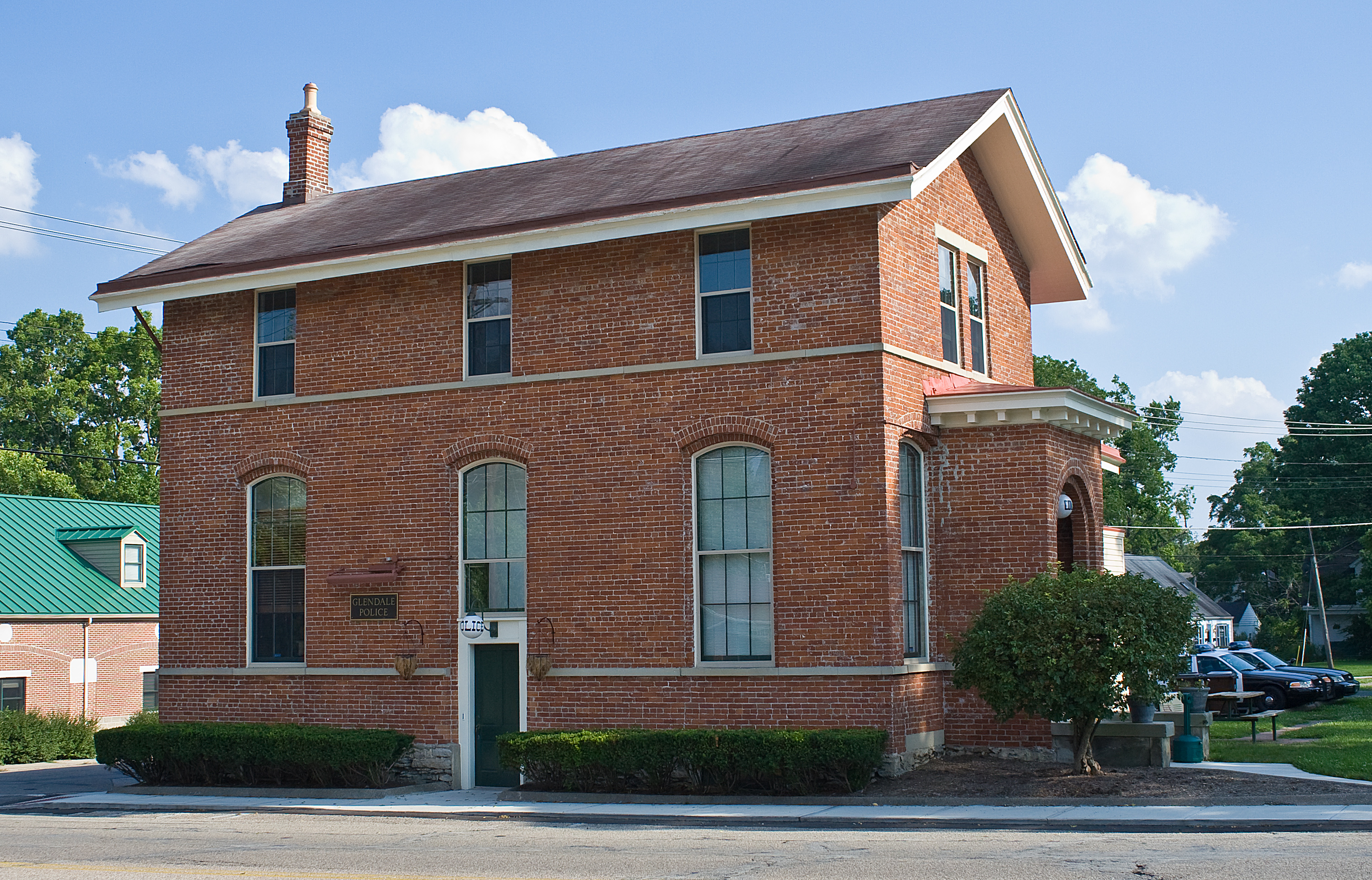
- Glendale Police Station

- Location within Ohio Location within the United States
- Location: 305 E. Sharon Ave., Glendale, Ohio
- Coordinates: 39°16′18″N 84°27′30″W
- Area: less than one acre
- Built: 1871
- Architect: Harry Neill Wilson
- NRHP reference No.: 75001425
- Added to NRHP: March 27, 1975

Glendale Police Station, also known as Council House and Jail, is a historic building in Glendale, Ohio. It was designed by architect H. Neill Wilson. It was listed in the National Register on March 27, 1975.
