= Ossabaw Island =

Historic island in Georgia, US

- U.S. National Register of Historic Places
- U.S. Historic district
- Location within Georgia Location within the United States
- Interactive map of Ossabaw Island
- Nearest city: Savannah, Georgia
- Coordinates: 31°47′40″N 81°6′44″W
- Architect: Wallin, Henrik; Shipman, Ellen Biddle
- Architectural style: Mission/Spanish Revival, Stick/Eastlake, saddlebag
- NRHP reference No.: 96000468
- Added to NRHP: May 06, 1996

Ossabaw Island is one of the Sea Islands located on the Atlantic Ocean off the coast of the U.S. state of Georgia approximately twenty miles by water south from the historic downtown of the city of Savannah. One of the largest of Georgia's barrier islands, Ossabaw contains 9,000 acres (3,600 ha) of wooded uplands with freshwater ponds and 16,000 acres (6,500 ha) of marshlands interlaced with tidal creeks. Located between Wassaw Island and the Ogeechee River on the north and St. Catherines Island on the south, the island is not linked to the mainland by bridge or causeway. At 26,000 acres (11,000 ha), it is the third-largest barrier island off the coast of Georgia.

== History ==
Evidence of human presence extends for at least 4,000 years based on pottery shards unearthed from the island's numerous oyster shell middens. It was inhabited by the Guale Indians at the time of the Spanish exploration of the Georgia coast in the early 16th century. Throughout the Spanish mission period the Guale alternately supplied and fought with the Spanish. When English occupation of the area replaced the Spanish in the 1730s, the Guale had moved inland possibly in response to disease and coastal marauding under the Spanish. The earliest English treaties reserved the island as hunting and fishing grounds for the Creek Indians.

In 1758 a group of Creek leaders was persuaded to convey the island to King George II of Great Britain. In 1760 Henri Bourquin claimed ownership of the island. He later sold it to his son-in-law, John Morell. Morell used enslaved people to farm and timber the island. At his death, the island was divided into four plantations. Morell's will includes 155 enslaved people, whom his three living sons inherited. After the American Civil War the island was farmed on a small scale by several owners and tenant farmers until the early 20th century. In 1907 Savannah native, Henry D. Weed, purchased over 9000 acres of the island, and by 1916 Weed was the island's sole owner. After 1916 it was used as a hunting retreat while owned by a group of wealthy businessmen until it was purchased in 1924 by Dr. Henry Norton Torrey and his wife Nell Ford Torrey, of Detroit, Michigan.

In 1961 The Ossabaw Foundation created by Eleanor Torrey West and Clifford B. West launched the Ossabaw Island Project as an artistic and scholarly retreat. Over the years the island's solitude and natural beauty served as the setting for notable visitors including composers Aaron Copland, Samuel Barber; writers Ralph Ellison, Annie Dillard, Olive Ann Burns, and Margaret Atwood; sculptor Harry Bertoia; and scientist Eugene Odum. The Ossabaw Foundation was also host to The Genesis Project, scientific research and public use and education programs on the island.

In 1978, no longer able to subsidize the artistic, educational, and scientific activity on the island, and eschewing lucrative offers of resort development, Mrs. West and her brother's children chose to sell the island to the State of Georgia as a Heritage Preserve with the understanding that Ossabaw would "be used for natural, scientific and cultural study, research and education, and environmentally sound preservation, conservation and management of the Island's ecosystem."

== Ossabaw today ==
Currently Ossabaw is managed by the Georgia Department of Natural Resources (DNR), which has entered into a Use Agreement with The Ossabaw Island Foundation, a Savannah-based non-profit organization which regulates access and use of historic areas. The foundation works cooperatively with the State of Georgia's DNR to manage access to Ossabaw for public educational programs.

The Ossabaw Island Foundation, a public charity established in 1994, defines its mission this way: "[The Foundation]...in a public-private partnership with the State of Georgia, inspires, promotes, and manages exceptional educational, cultural, and scientific programs that are designed to maximize the experience of Ossabaw Island, while minimizing the impact on its resources." The general public must apply to visit. The Foundation follows the guidelines established by Mrs. West and embodied in the Heritage Preserve of 1978: The island is open to groups engaged in study, research and education. Those groups include young people, adult interest groups, colleges and universities, teachers, artists and researchers. Some examples of the research that occurs on in the island involves nesting of loggerhead sea turtles, monitoring migratory bird patterns, investigating tooth wear of deer fawns and genetic studies on feral Sicilian donkeys.

Ossabaw Island Comprehensive Management Plan says the hogs and donkeys are to be removed. Presumably, the way the document is written, the feral horses will also be removed. Ossabawisland.org states "all remaining donkeys have been sterilized to prevent future generations."

== In popular culture ==
- In season 8 of Fear the Walking Dead, Ossabaw Island is the location of PADRE given the coordinates recited by Madison Clark in "All I See is Red."

== See also ==
- USS Water Witch (1851), Union ship captured in Ossabaw Sound by Confederates during American Civil War
- Ossabaw Island Hog
- Kilkenny (Richmond Hill, Georgia)

== Relevant publications ==
- Foskey, Ann Images of America, Ossabaw Island (2001) 128 pages includes extensive photos
- Stuckey, Jill (photographer), Evan Kutzler (narrative). 2016. Ossabaw Island. Macon, GA: Mercer University Press
