= James Flint (merchant) =

British merchant and diplomat (born 1720)

James Flint (Chinese name: 洪任輝, Hóng Rènhuī, 1720 – unknown) was a British merchant and diplomat employed by the East India Company and noted for his role in precipitating the Canton System of Chinese trade with the West. One of the first English people to learn the Chinese language, Flint broke Qing dynasty court protocol through a direct complaint to the Qianlong Emperor, which led to three years of detention in the Portuguese colony of Macau. In later life, he was jointly responsible for the introduction of the soybean to North America.

== Biography ==
=== Early life ===
Left in China as a teenage boy by Captain Rigby of the Honourable East India Company ship Normanton in 1736, Flint grew to adulthood speaking Mandarin Chinese. For reasons unknown, he adopted or was given the Chinese name Hóng Rènhuī (洪任辉) and in 1739 departed for Bombay and other East India Company run locations. Three years later he returned to China to continue his language studies, for which, according to scholar H.B. Morse the Company provided funding. As a result, some 136 years after its foundation James Flint became the Company's Chinese interpreter and the first such individual in British history. In 1741 he took up a position at the Company factory in Canton, where he considered British trade unsatisfactory, even though at that time it surpassed that of the French and the Dutch. In 1746 Flint took passage on the Company ship Tavistock and became "Linguist to all our Supra Cargoes in general", receiving 90 taels of silver per ship and accommodation at the Company's factories. During the War of the Austrian Succession (1740–1748), the Company remained comparatively powerful and expanded its business in China. Nevertheless, its trade volume still lagged behind that of its combined European competitors. Under these circumstances the Company became anxious to expand its trade into China's interior. With trading conditions in Canton unsatisfactory, the British decided to reopen their former trade in Ningbo and other northern ports.

=== Flint Affair ===
By the 1750s the British economy had undergone significant development such that Canton could no longer satisfy the trade volumes required by the East India Company. A group of foreign businessmen headed by Flint and already disgruntled by illegal extortion on the part of the Canton customs bureau stood ready to purchase large quantities of raw silk, tea and Nankeen cloth from their point of origin or a port nearby. Between 1755 and 1757, Flint and his associates made successive sea voyages north to trade at Ningbo in Zhejiang Province.

Qing officials knew that allowing Sino-British commerce in Zhejiang would undoubtedly bring increased prosperity to the province and spur its development. However, given the length of time that foreign trade had been focused on Canton, a powerful interest group comprising the local Chinese merchants, customs officials and Qing scholar-bureaucrats had developed there. This faction enjoyed a monopoly on trade and its associated corruption and extortion from which it extracted the maximum benefit. They were naturally unwilling to allow any part of their interests in Canton to be transferred to the north. Meanwhile, Zhejiang possessed a number of potential foreign trade ports but opening them up would have the unsettling side effect of creating additional responsibility for local officials. As a result, Yang Yingju (zh: 杨应琚), Governor-general of Min-Zhe and responsible for Zhejiang, lobbied officials in Beijing for a prohibition of trade in Ningbo. Moreover, the emperor received reports regarding the presence of armed Western merchant ships all along the coast, urging him to concentrate the Westerners in Guangzhou where the subsequently-expanded Guangdong fleet could more effectively guard and monitor them. In 1757, the Qianlong Emperor responded to pressure from his officials and implemented a new foreign trade policy whereby all ships from overseas were barred from every Chinese port with the exception of Canton. Known in Chinese as Yī kŏu tōngshāng (一口通商 "Single port commerce system"), the Canton System arose in part as a result of Flint's actions.

==== Flint's complaint in Tianjin ====
With the East India Company unwilling to abide by this new prohibition, in May 1759 James Flint once again left Canton and sailed north for Ningbo. However, when he arrived in Dinghai (定海), at that time known as Chusan, he found a contingent of the Qing army waiting, who advised him to return south. The next month Flint left Dinghai but instead of returning to Canton he made straight for Tianjin. On 24 June he arrived outside Tianjin and announced himself as a British official of the Fourth Grade (sìpǐn, 四品), which would place him approximately halfway down the hierarchy of Chinese officialdom. He explained that he had previously traded in Guangdong and Macau but that the merchant Li Guanghua (黎光华) had not paid the silver he owed. Flint continued that he had complained to Li Yongbiao (李永标), the Hoppo (Guangdong Customs Supervisor) and Li Shiyao (李侍尧), the Governor-general of Liangguang but they both had refused to listen to his grievances so he came to Ningbo. Now, he said, at the behest of British officials, he had come to Tianjin to request that his complaint be heard in Beijing. The Governor-general of Zhili, whose jurisdiction extended over Tianjin, then undertook to report Flint's complaint to Qianlong. Thus began a diplomatic incident that would become known as the "Flint Affair". On receipt of the complaint Qianlong responded, "This matter concerning a foreigner and the State must be thoroughly investigated in accordance with the clear laws of the Celestial Empire." The emperor went on to say that if Flint's complaint turned out to be true, Li Yongbiao and the others responsible would be publicly executed.

Accompanied by a specially chosen Qing official, Flint found himself rushed back to Canton by land, the first British subject to ever make that journey. The General Commanding the Troops in Fuzhou (福州将军), Xin Zhu (新柱), hurried to Guangdong to conduct the investigation. There, he and Qianlong's chosen official arrested Li Yongbiao and Li Shiyao then confronted them with Flint's complaint, which listed seven grievances. However, Flint's real purpose in coming to Ningbo in the first place was to break through the single port commerce system and trade there –he had clearly stated on arrival in Dinghai that the rear of his ship was packed with silver.

While Flint was back in Canton, the British merchantman Chesterfield arrived in the waters off Zhejiang, but its offer to trade met with a refusal. The ship's captain then claimed that he needed to stay for a few days to repair the ship's sails but after a short standoff, Chesterfield sailed away. Qianlong viewed the episode with suspicion –he believed that the ship's arrival was connected with Flint's complaint, which would serve as a distraction while his supposed co-conspirators aboard Chesterfield tried to open the ports of Zhejiang to trade. The Chesterfield and its crew were never seen again.

==== Qianlong's decision ====
Qianlong's basis for deciding Flint's case focused on three principles:

- If the complaint of extortion and corruption proved true, Li Yong Biao would be executed and the details made public.
- Any Chinese "scoundrel" who had assisted Flint in writing his petition would be executed on the spot.
- Flint's desire to travel from Canton to Tianjin to present a petition was abhorrent, but Flint should also refrain from informal criticism of state policy.

According to written testimony from Li Shiyao, Li Yongbiao had not embezzled any government funds and had purchased goods on his own account for which he had not received compensation. Nevertheless, some of his relatives had taken delivery of goods from foreign traders and failed to pay for them. After deciding that Li Youngbiao had been blackmailed by his relatives, Qianlong stripped him of his position and sent him into exile. Li's relatives, along with other implicated Guangdong customs officials, suffered varying degrees of punishment. The emperor further ruled that the Chinese authors of Flint's complaint were particularly heinous. After investigation and analysis of the document, Qianlong concluded that it had been written in collusion with Liu Yabian (刘亚匾), a Sichuanese merchant, and subsequently edited by Lin Huan (林怀), a Fujianese translator employed by the East India Company in Batavia (now Jakarta, Indonesia). Qianlong then ordered Li Shibiao to gather the Hong merchants in Canton, where Liu Yabian was publicly executed as an object lesson in what would happen to Chinese citizens who aided "barbarians".

Despite Lin Huan's remote location, Qianlong secured his return to face punishment and he too was executed. At the same time he ordered the apprehension and interrogation of any members of Lin's family attempting to leave the country. The effect of the order was such that residents along the coast no longer dared to use their familiar sea routes to Jakarta.

As for Flint, for the crime of "barbarian" collusion with Chinese "scoundrels" to create a petition that attempted to overthrow the single port trade system, Qianlong ordered him imprisoned in Macau for the term of three years. Thereafter he would be deported from China and banished from the country forever.

==== Aftermath ====
In dealing with the seven specific complaints in Flint's petition, the Qing court outlawed the multiple forms of extortion in the form of gifts from merchants to officials known as guīlǐ (规礼) or "customary charges"; Chinese merchants owing the foreign traders silver would be pressured to pay; taxes due on the provisions aboard a foreign ship on departure would be abolished and the system of Chinese merchants standing surety for visiting traders would remain.

Although Qianlong's punishment of Li Yongbiao partially satisfied Flint's demands, forbidding extortion and the enforcing the rules of the merchant guarantee system hardly proved concessionary. Furthermore, Qianlong ordered the Grand Minister (Dàchén,大臣) for Guangdong to inform the foreign traders that with all the rich produce available in China, there was no urgent need to acquire trifling products from abroad, a sentiment that he would echo several decades hence when he received the 1793 Macartney Embassy. The single port trading system based around Canton would remain in force, thus dashing Flint's hopes for the opening up of Zhejiang. Worse still, in order to keep a tighter rein on foreign traders in Canton, on 24 December 1759 the Qing Court proclaimed the "Vigilance Towards Foreign Barbarian Regulations" (Fángfàn wàiyí guītiáo, 防范外夷规条), also known as the (Fáng yí wŭ shì, 防夷五事, literally, "Five counter-measures against the barbarians"), which amongst other things forbade foreign trade in the winter and forced western merchants to live in the Thirteen Factories.

After Flint's release he was taken to Whampoa where he boarded the Company ship Horsenden bound for England. In total, he earned £8,500 from 1760–66, £6,500 of which was from commission as a supercargo and £2,000 for "hardships suffered" including his imprisonment for three years between December 1759 and November 1762.

=== Introduction of the soybean to North America ===
During his years in China, Flint had ample opportunity to examine Chinese agriculture practices at first hand. As a result, on his return from the East he teamed up with fellow former East India Company employee Samuel Bowen, whom he had met on board the Company ship Success back in 1759, to introduce the soybean to North America. Bowen, possibly with funding from Flint, acquired land in Georgia where he produced soy sauce and soy vermicelli noodles. In 1770, Flint corresponded with noted U.S. statesman and scientist Benjamin Franklin on the subject of how the Chinese converted callivances (soybeans) into tofu. Flint's letter is the earliest documented use of the word "tofu" in the English language.

== Notes ==
Bibliography

- Chaplin, J. E. (1996). An Anxious Pursuit: Agricultural Innovation and Modernity in the Lower South, 1730–1815. University of North Carolina Press. ISBN 9780807846131.
- Davis, John Francis (1836). The Chinese: A General Description of China and its inhabitants. London:Charles Knight & Co.
- Gao, Shujuan (高淑娟); Feng, Bin (冯斌) (2003). Comparative Outline of Chinese and Japanese Foreign Policy: Central Trade Policy in the Final Years of the Imperial Era (中日对外经济政策比较史纲: 以封建末期贸易政策为中心). Qinghua University Chinese Economic Historiography Series (清华大学中国经济史学丛书) (in Chinese). Qinghua University Publishing (清华大学出版社). ISBN 9787302075172.
- Golden, Sean (2000). Society of Jesus to the East India Company: A Case Study in the Social History of Translation (PDF). State University of New York at Binghamton. Archived from the original (PDF) on 2 February 2014.
- Hamann, Hanjo (2009). The importance of language learning, understanding of other peoples, and cultural awareness in the development of successful international businesses. GRIN Verlag. ISBN 9783640312047.
- Lindsay, J. O. (1957). Old Regime, 1713–1763. The New Cambridge Modern History. Vol. 7. Cambridge University Press. ISBN 9780521045452.
- Morse, Hosea Ballou (1926). The Chronicles of the East India Company Trading to China 1635–1834. The Chronicles of the East India Company. Vol. 1. Harvard University Press.
- Schottenhammer, Angela (2007). The East Asian Maritime World 1400–1800: Its Fabrics of Power and Dynamics of Exchanges. East Asian economic and socio-cultural studies. Harrassowitz. ISBN 9783447054744.
- Shurtleff, W.; Aoyagi, A. (2012). History of Soy Sauce (160 CE To 2012). Soyinfo Center. ISBN 9781928914440.
- Stifler, S. R. (1938). "The language of students of the East India Company's Canton factory". Journal of the North China Branch of the Royal Asiatic Society. 69.
