= William Russell Allen House =

Historic house in Massachusetts, United States

- U.S. National Register of Historic Places
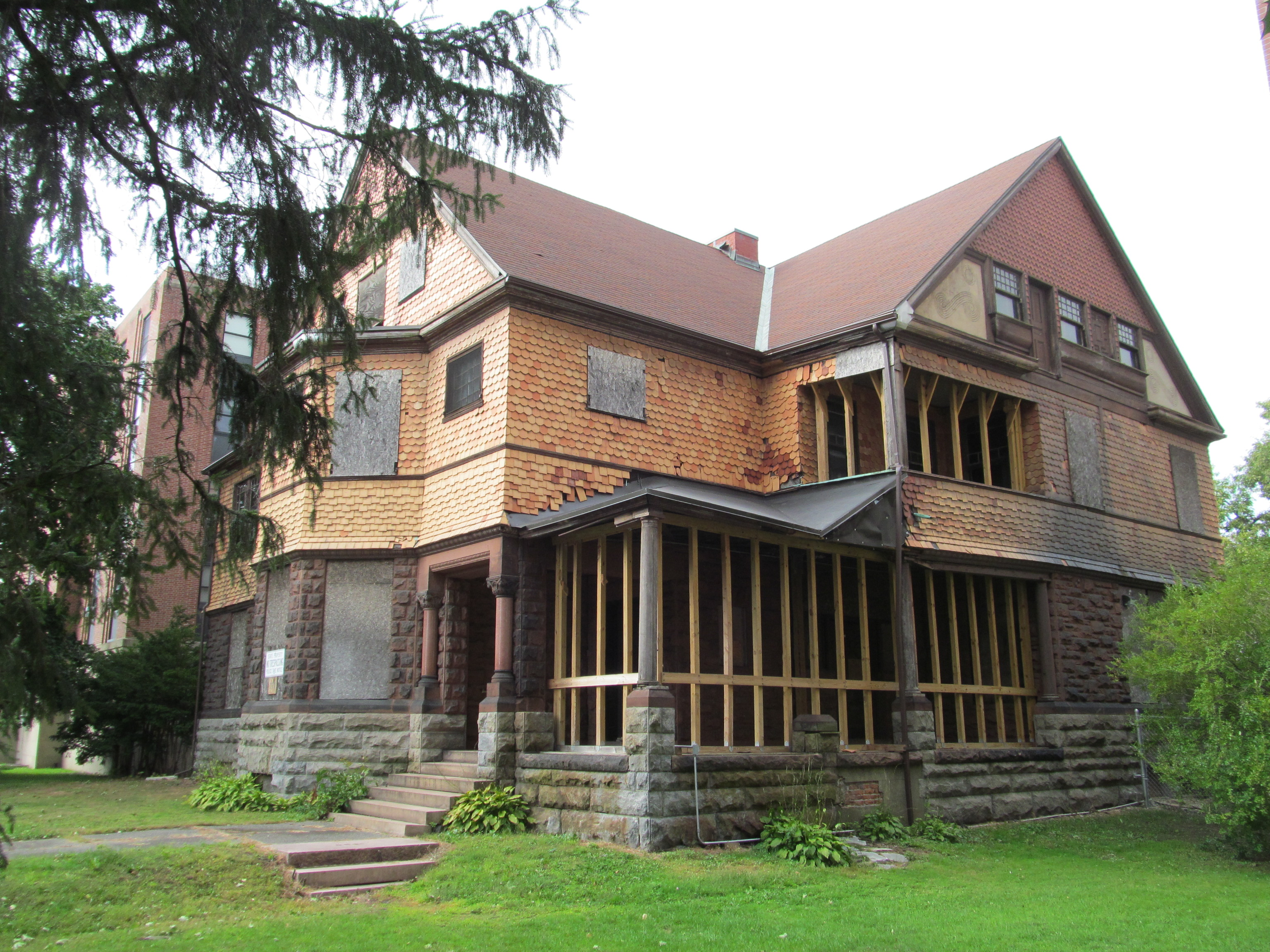

- Location within Massachusetts Location within the United States
- Location: 359 East St., Pittsfield, Massachusetts
- Coordinates: 42°26′52″N 73°14′49″W
- Built: 1886
- Architect: H. Neill Wilson
- Architectural style: Queen Anne style architecture in the United States
- NRHP reference No.: 80000427
- Added to NRHP: May 7, 1980

The William Russell Allen House is a historic house at 359 East Street in Pittsfield, Massachusetts. Built in 1886, it was the first local design of H. Neill Wilson, and is an important example of Shingle style architecture in Berkshire. It is also a rare surviving reminder of East Street's residential past. It was listed on the National Register of Historic Places in 1980.

== Description and history ==
The William Russell House stands east of the downtown Pittsfield, in a builtup area on the north side of East Street between 2nd and 4th Streets. It is closely sandwiched by a tall government office building to its left, and the Providence Court housing complex to its right. It is a 2 1/2-story structure, with a cross-gabled roof configuration and an exterior finished in a variety of materials. Its foundation is rusticated granite, the first floor is finished in rusticated bluestone, and the second floor is finished in terra cotta tiled. The upper gable ends are finished in a combination of stucco and terra cotta tile. The porch extending along one side is decorated in marble and brownstone. The interior has very high quality woodwork and tile.

The house was designed by H. Neill Wilson, and built in 1886 as a town house for William Russell Allen, a wealthy member of a locally prominent family. The house was the first major commission in the region by Wilson, who went on to a long a successful career as an architect in the county and elsewhere. The house is an early example of the Shingle style of design, influenced by the work of H.H. Richardson, which Wilson was known to have studied.

== See also ==
- National Register of Historic Places listings in Berkshire County, Massachusetts
