= Pilgrim Memorial Church and Parish House =

Historic church in Massachusetts, United States

- U.S. National Register of Historic Places
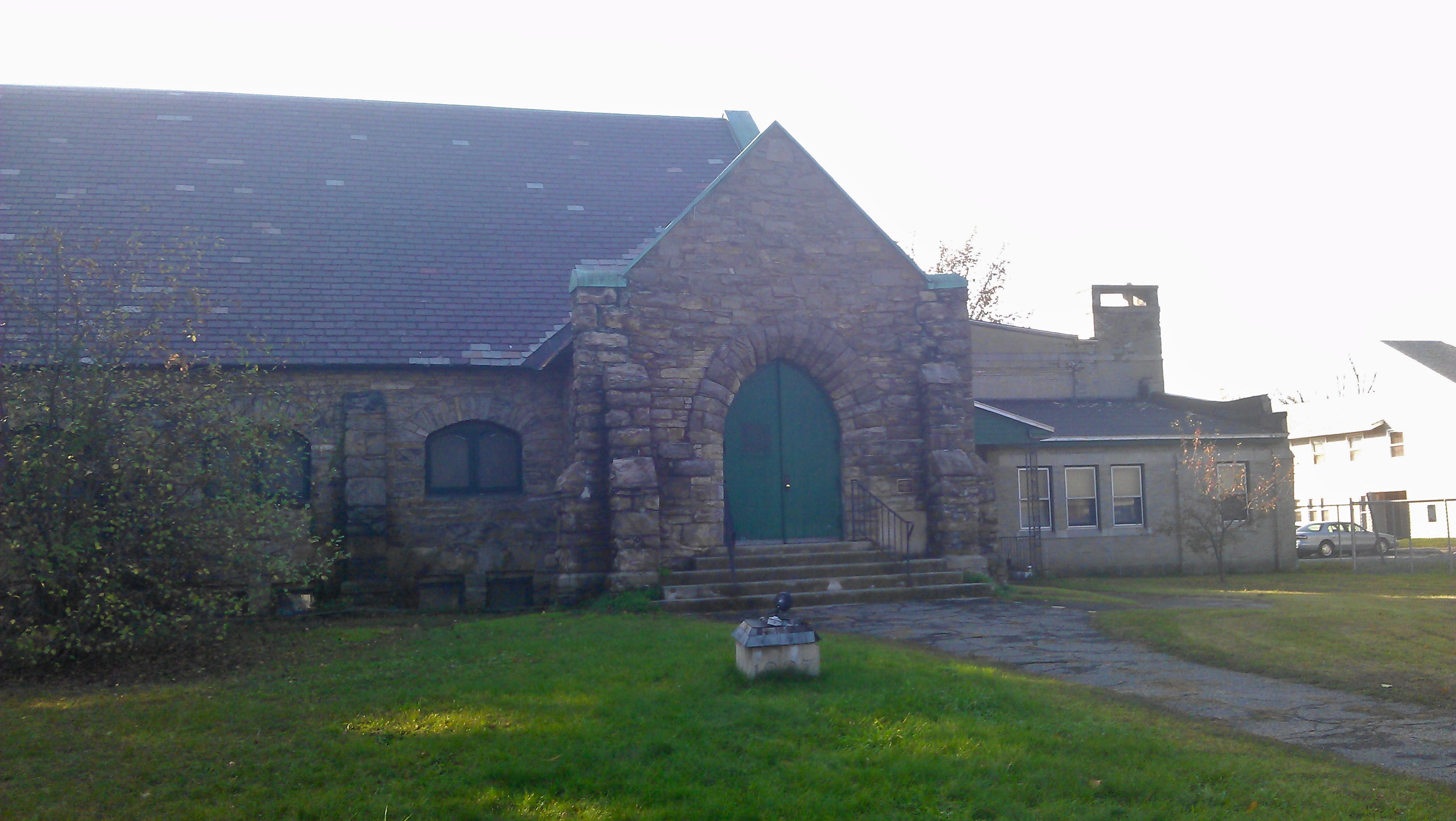

- Location within Massachusetts Location within the United States
- Location: 249 Wahconah St., Pittsfield, Massachusetts
- Coordinates: 42°27′56″N 73°15′14″W
- Area: less than one acre
- Built: 1897
- Architect: H. Neill Wilson et al.
- Architectural style: Gothic, Romanesque
- NRHP reference No.: 05001323
- Added to NRHP: November 25, 2005

Pilgrim Memorial Church and Parish House is an historic church and parsonage at 249 Wahconah Street in Pittsfield, Massachusetts. The church was designed by H. Neill Wilson, and was completed in 1897. It is a good local example of Gothic and Romanesque architecture, and was the first church built to serve the mill workers in the city's north end. The property was listed on the National Register of Historic Places in 2005. The present church congregation is Presbyterian.

== Architecture and history ==
Pilgrim Memorial Church stands in a mixed-use area north of downtown Pittsfield, on the west side of Wahconah Street south of its junction with Pecks Road and Pontoosuc Avenue. It is a modestly scaled stone structure, built out of local fieldstone and covered by a steeply pitched gable roof. The gable ends are slightly parapeted, and there are projecting gable sections at the northern end. The east-facing projection houses the main entrance, and has projecting stone buttresses. The south-facing sanctuary facade has three tall Gothic windows, the center one rising into the gable.

The church's construction was an outgrowth of planning by local church leaders to provide services closer to where the city's workers lived. Plans for this site were drawn by local architect H. Neill Wilson, which included a chapel (seating about 300), and a larger sanctuary seating 450. Of the two, only the smaller chapel was ever built. The parish house was built in 1927, and was also designed by Wilson. Unlike the church, which was built in granite, the parish house is a single story tan brick building in a more utilitarian style.

== See also ==
- National Register of Historic Places listings in Berkshire County, Massachusetts
