= Samuel Bowen =

English entrepreneur and farmer

- Died: 30 December 1777; London, England
- Occupations: Entrepreneur; farmer
- Known for: Introduction of soya bean to North America
- Spouse: Jane Bowen (m. 1765–1777; his death)

Samuel Bowen (died 30 December 1777) was an English entrepreneur and farmer who established an estate in Savannah, Province of Georgia, where he cultivated the first soya beans in North America. While earlier sources credited Benjamin Franklin with the introduction of the soya bean to North America, later research has shown that Bowen was responsible.

== China and London ==
On 8 February 1758, Bowen travelled to Canton (now known as Guangzhou), in China aboard the 600-tonne (590-long-ton; 660-short-ton) British East India Company (EIC) ship Pitt, via Madras, where the vessel joined up with smaller two-masted tender Success. Only vague details exist of what Bowen did in China, although he claimed to have been kept prisoner in the country for four years and was "carried 2,000 miles from place to place through the interior". He resurfaced in London, England, in November 1763, when he petitioned the Court of Directors of the EIC for compensation owing to his travails in China and the wages he was owed. On 7 March 1764, the court ordered that he should receive £19 10d from the captain of the Pitt.

== North America ==
By 1764, Bowen had established himself in Savannah, Province of Georgia, as a farmer and entrepreneur. His marriage to Jeanie (Jane) Spencer, daughter of Savannah customs collector William Spencer, on 30 March 1765 gave him "instant respectibility". However, due to a lack of land on which to plant seeds, in the spring of 1765 Bowen asked Henry Yonge, the Surveyor-General of Georgia, to plant seed that he had brought from China. In a letter dated 23 December 1766, Yonge wrote:

This is to certify that the peas or vetches, lately introduced by Mr. Samuel Bowen in this province from China, were planted by me the last year at Mr. Bowen's request, and did yield three crops; and had the frost kept of one week longer, I should have had a fourth crop; which is a very extraordinary increase, and must, if attended to and encouraged, be of great utility and advantage to this, and his majesty's other southern American provinces.

Two weeks after his wedding, Bowen purchased 450 acres (180 ha) of land at Thunderbolt, east of Savannah, where he built a ranch, which he called "Greenwich". Funds for the purchase were possibly provided by James Flint, a long-time employee of the EIC in China whom Bowen had met on board the Success back in 1759. On his new estate, Bowen began to grow soya beans, then known as "Luk Taw" or "Chinese vetch", from which he made soy sauce and vermicelli noodles. He suspected that the sprouts of his plants had antiscorbutic properties that would be of use to the British Royal Navy in their fight against scurvy, research that led to his receiving a gold medal from the Society for the Encouragement of Arts, Manufactures and Commerce in 1766 and a gift of £200 from King George III. The following year, Bowen received a patent from the British government for his "new invented method of preparing and making sago, vermicelli and soy from plants growing in America, to be equal in goodness to those made in the East Indies". According to the 1805 The American Universal Geography, Bowen also introduced tea from China to Georgia. These activities likely brought Bowen to the attention of the American Philosophical Society in Philadelphia, which elected him to membership in 1769.

== Death and legacy ==
Bowen died in London on 30 December 1777. Two years later, his widow Jane became host to two officers from the fleet of Charles Hector, comte d'Estaing, at Greenwich during the Second Battle of Savannah. She supervised the burial of Polish General Casimir Pulaski, who was killed during the battle, "between her mansion and the river". Upon her death in 1782, she bequeathed her four children 26 slaves, 15 cows, and two oxen, along with a variety of machines for the processing of sago.
