= Upper North Street Commercial District =

Historic district in Massachusetts, United States

- U.S. National Register of Historic Places
- U.S. Historic district
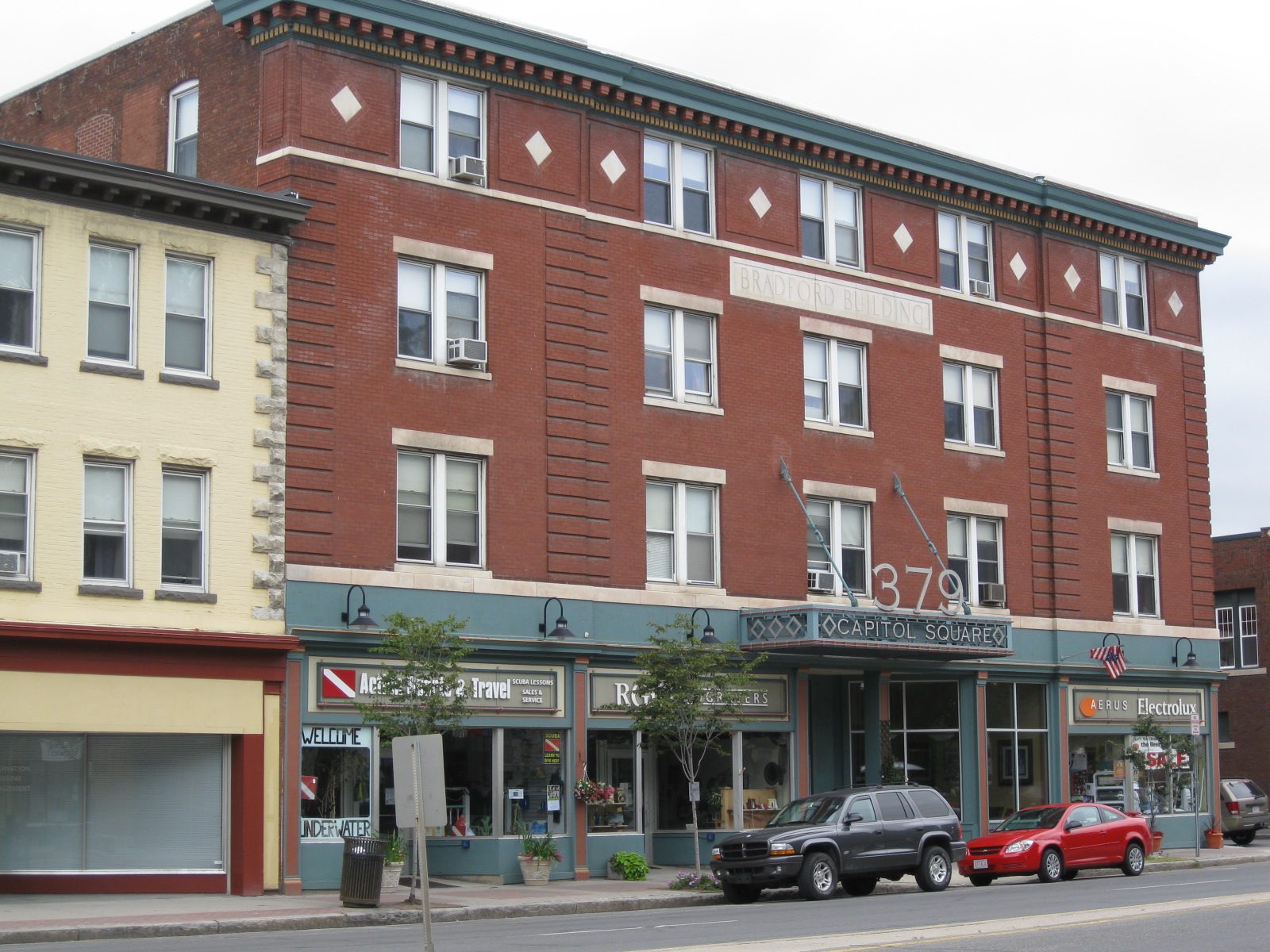
- The Bradford Block on North Street

- Location within Massachusetts Location within the United States
- Location: North St., Pittsfield, Massachusetts
- Coordinates: 42°27′14″N 73°15′9″W
- Area: 11 acres (4.5 ha)
- Architect: multiple
- Architectural style: Colonial Revival, Renaissance
- NRHP reference No.: 02001615
- Added to NRHP: December 27, 2002

The Upper North Street Commercial District is a historic district on the north side of downtown Pittsfield, Massachusetts, United States. Representing an expansion of Pittsfield's historic downtown area northward from Park Square in the late 19th century, the district encompasses primarily commercial buildings fronting on North Street between Columbus and Madison Avenues on the west side, and between Eagle and Maplewood Avenues on the east side. The notable exceptions are the Berkshire Eagle building, located on Eagle Street next to Sottile Park, and the St. Joseph's Church complex. The district features Colonial Revival and Renaissance style architecture. It was added to the National Register of Historic Places in 2002.

== History ==
Pittsfield's early civic and commercial development took place around Park Square Historic District, and was for most of the 19th century stopped at the railroad tracks of the Boston and Albany Railroad, which cross North Street three blocks north of Park Square. By 1890 the entire stretch of North Street between Park Square and the tracks was built out with commercial blocks. Early uses of the area north of the tracks (even before their construction) were as a militia training area and cantonment during the War of 1812, although the principal development that took place in the first half of the 19th century was residential. Part of the militia cantonment area was acquired by the Roman Catholic Church in 1863 for the construction of St. Joseph's, and the first masonry commercial block was built north of the tracks in 1875. An electric trolley was laid out on North Street in 1891, spurring commercial development that transformed the area over the next 30 years.

== See also ==
- National Register of Historic Places listings in Berkshire County, Massachusetts
