= American Naval Stores Company =

- Formerly: S. P. Shotter Company
- Company type: Naval stores industry
- Founded: 1906
- Founders: Spencer Proudfoot Shotter
- Defunct: 1913
- Headquarters: Savannah, Georgia, U.S.
- Owners: Spencer Proudfoot Shotter

American Naval Stores Company was an American company established in 1906 in West Virginia, with its head office in Savannah, Georgia. It bought, sold, shipped and exported turpentine and resin from the Southern United States to national and international destinations. The term naval stores refers to products derived from conifers.

The company's founder was Spencer Proudfoot Shotter, a Canadian who emigrated to the United States to pursue a career in wood processing from the trees in the forests of Georgia. The company came about via a merger between the S. P. Shotter Company and Paterson, Downing Company.

It was said that the company's formation led to the creation of enough jobs to assist in Savannah's exit from the post-Civil War depression. The company had branches in New York City, New Orleans, Jacksonville, Pensacola, Chicago, Philadelphia, Gulfport, Mobile, Cincinnati, St. Louis, Brunswick, Fernandina, Wilmington, Louisville and Tampa.

In the first half of the 20th century, the company was charged with, according to the Georgia Historical Society, "attempting to monopolize interstate trade in the naval stores industry," a violation of the Sherman Antitrust act. The United States Supreme Court decided in the defendants' favor on June 9, 1913, reversing an earlier judgment. The company folded shortly thereafter due to the costs incurred during the trial.

== Personnel ==
The company was composed of the following individuals:

- Edmund C. Nash, president
- Spencer P. Shotter, chairman
- J. F. Cooper Meyers, vice-president
- George M. Boardman, treasurer
- C. J. Deloach, secretary
