= John Morell =

American merchant, planter, and slaveholder

John Morell (17 February 1733–c. 1776) was an American merchant, planter, and slaveholder.

John Morell was born to Peter Morel, of Zurich, Switzerland, in 1733 in Savannah, Georgia. He married Mary Anne Bourquin, daughter of Henri Francois and Marie Bourquin in 1755. Together they had five children: Peter (1757), John (1759), Mary (1761), Henry, Susannah (1765). After the death of Mary Anne, Morell married Mary Bryan, daughter of Jonathan Bryan and Mary Williamson. With Mary Bryan, Morell had six children: Elizabeth (1767–1769), Bryan, Isaac (1770–1777), Esther (1772), Anne (1774), Hannah. At the time of his death, his estate included 155 enslaved people, which he did not manumit. Instead these people were inherited, along with cattle, by his three living sons.

After marrying his second wife, Morell purchased Ossabaw Island from his new father-in-law (1760, 1763). He began a large timbering, shipbuilding, and indigo-cultivation enterprise facilitated by the 150 enslaved people recorded in his will. In 1770, he was elected as a member to the American Philosophical Society. He served as delegate to the Provincial Council of Georgia (1774), as a member of the council of safety (1775), and died not long thereafter.
