= Wassaw Island =

Island in Georgia, United States

Wassaw National Wildlife Refuge
- IUCN category IV (habitat/species management area)
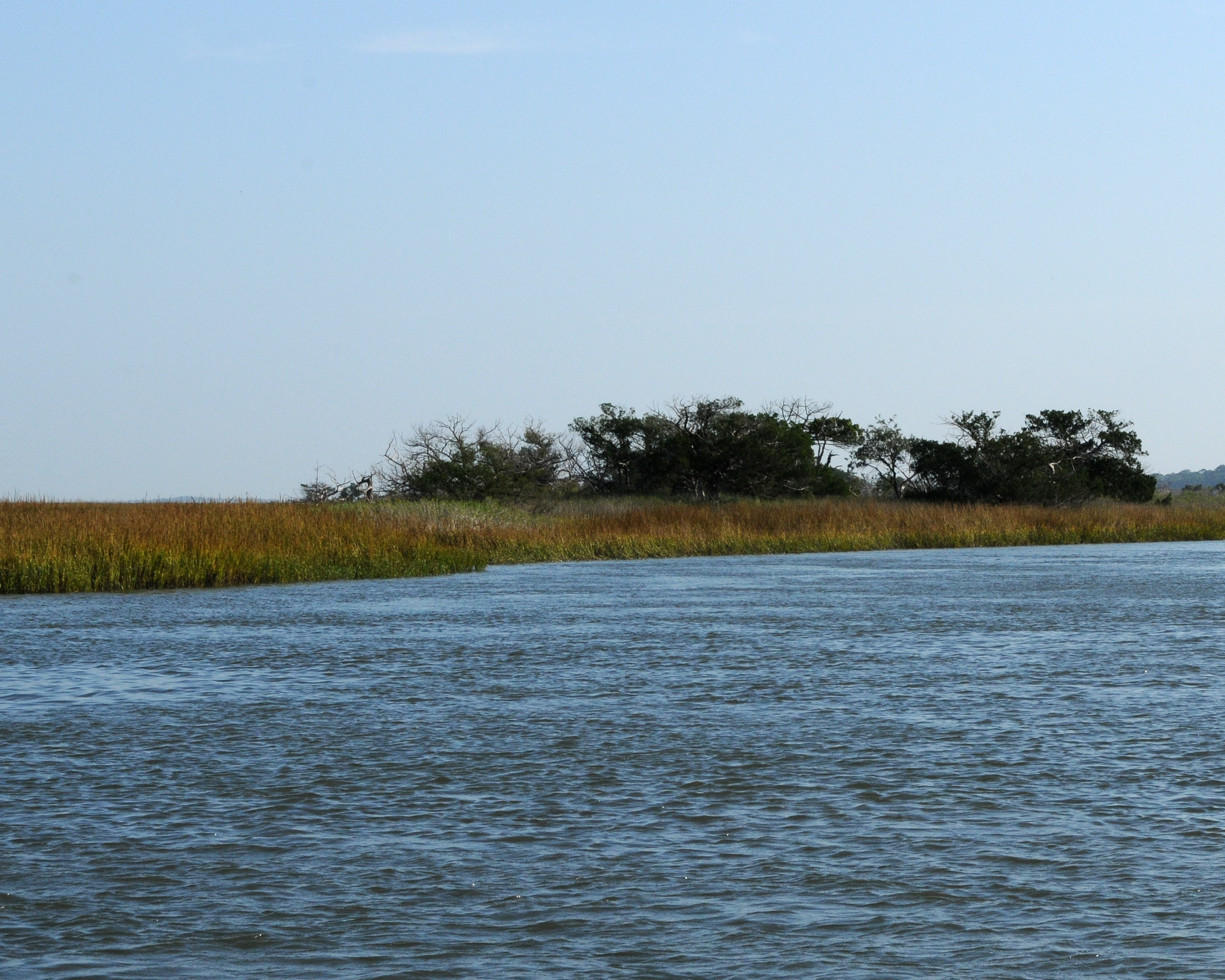

- Location within Georgia Location within the United States
- Interactive map of Wassaw National Wildlife Refuge
- Location: Chatham County, Georgia, United States
- Nearest city: Montgomery, Georgia
- Coordinates: 31.9003°N 80.9822°W
- Area: 10,053 acres (40.68 km^{2})
- Established: 1969
- Governing body: U.S. Fish and Wildlife Service
- Website: Wassaw National Wildlife Refuge

U.S. National Natural Landmark
- Designated: 1967

Wassaw Island is one of the Sea Islands. It is located on the Atlantic Ocean off the coast of the U.S. state of Georgia and is within the borders of Chatham County. The island and its surrounding marshlands are part of the Wassaw National Wildlife Refuge, which has a total area of 10,053 acres (40.68 km^{2}) of marsh, mudflats, and tidal creeks, including approximately 7 miles (11 km) of undeveloped beaches. The land mass is 76 percent salt marshes and 24 percent beaches, dunes, and maritime forest. The refuge is a part of the Savannah Coastal Refuges Complex. A portion of the island is retained as a private compound for the former owner’s family.

The United States government owns most of the island, while a portion is still privately held by the island's former owners, the Parsons family. Loggerhead sea turtles nest on the beaches in late spring and early summer, and turtlers can camp at the turtlers' cabin at the Federal Dock (refuge headquarters office), and then go to the beach at night to observe the turtles. Aside from this, the Federal Dock is usually only used when natural disasters occur on the island and assistance is necessary.

The island is accessible only by chartered or private boat. Most visitors arriving by private boat anchor their boats to the north or south beaches or in Wassaw Creek, near the boat dock for the refuge headquarters office. The public is encouraged to use twenty miles (32 km) of dirt trails for hiking or bicycling.

== History ==
Human activity and impact on Wassaw has been minimal. Native Americans apparently used the island for hunting fish, fowl, reptiles, and shellfish. Indian artifacts dating to A.D. 500-600 have been found on the island.

For most of the 19th century the island was occupied by Anthony Odingsell, an African American planter, who inherited Little Wassaw Island from his former master and probable father, Charles Odingsell. Anthony Odingsell was the wealthiest free person of color in Georgia for many years.

During the Civil War the island was occupied first by Confederate troops and then Union troops. Then in 1866, George Parsons, a wealthy businessman, purchased the island with the intent of making it a holiday retreat for family and friends. Although his attempts to populate the island with hogs, pheasants, turkey and quail failed, he built an extensive housing compound for his family in the center of the island, along with approximately 20 miles (32 km) of interior roads.

In 1898, during the Spanish–American War, a fort was built into the dunes on the north end of the island as part of the Endicott system of coastal forts. Over time, high tides, wind, and rain have eroded away the dunes, and the fort made of oyster tabby, poured concrete, and North Georgia granite continues to deteriorate from its already dilapidated condition.

In 1930, the Parsons family formed the Wassaw Island Trust, with the goal of conservation and preserving the island's natural state.

A few decades later in 1969, the Parsons family learned that the state of Georgia was considering employing eminent domain to condemn the island and open it for public, commercial use and development. In an effort to keep the island from being developed, the family conveyed part of the island to the United States for permanent preservation as a National Wildlife Refuge. Today, the island continues to be a designated refuge and is managed by the U.S. Fish and Wildlife Service, while the Parsons family retains a private housing compound on the island.

The Caretta Research Project, a conservation project focused on the study and protection of loggerhead sea turtles, also operates from the island. The project, which was founded in 1972, originated as a collaboration between the Savannah Science Museum and the Parsons family's Wassaw Island Trust. Caretta's work focuses on the conservation of endangered loggerhead sea turtles, and is conducted on the island by volunteers.

== Wassaw National Wildlife Refuge ==
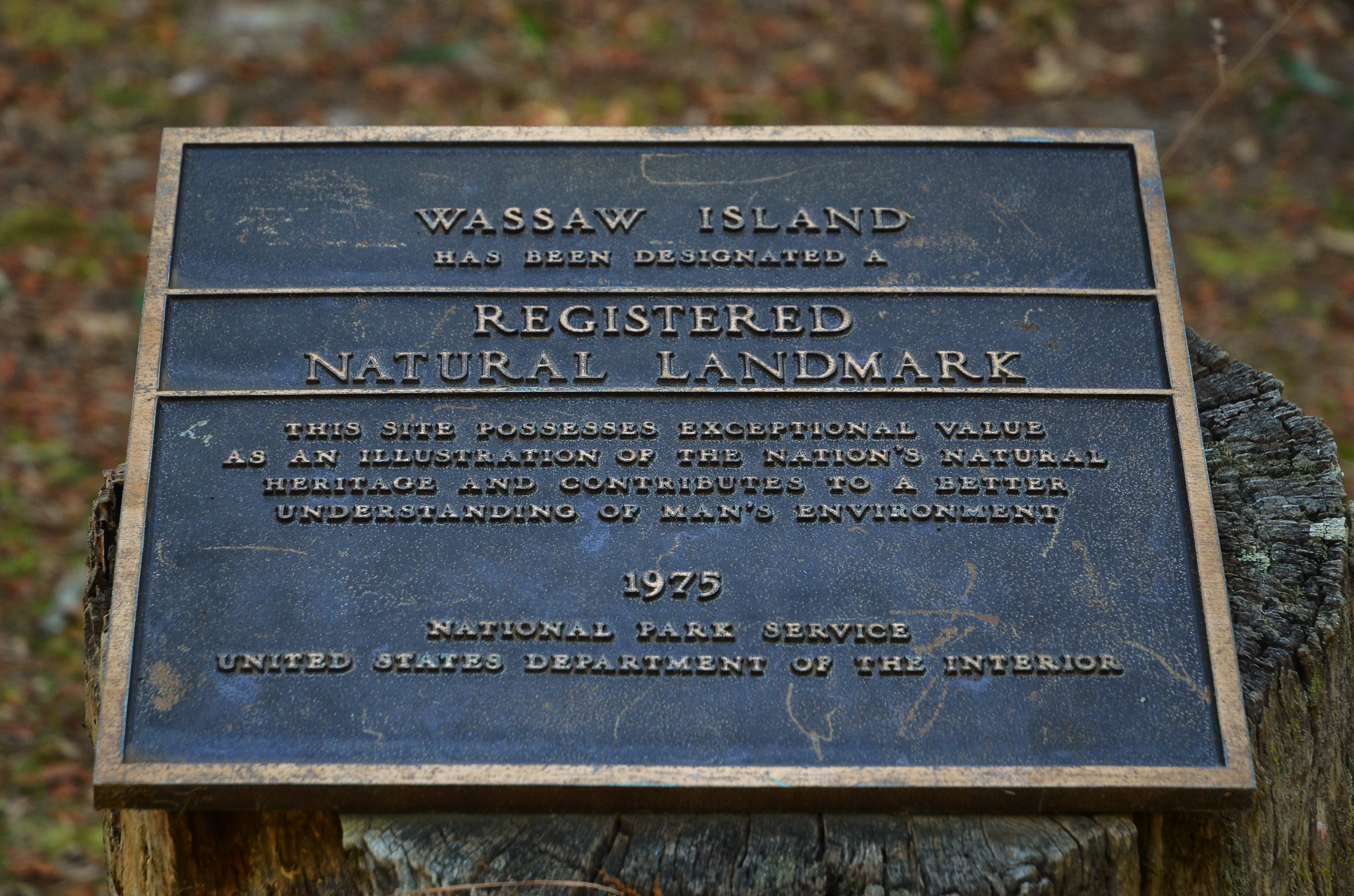
Designated a Natural Landmark in 1975

The wildlife refuge, established in 1969, is located at 31°52′46″N 81°01′29″W, approximately 14 miles (23 km) southeast of Savannah and at its closest point is 3.25 miles (5.23 km) southeast of popular Skidaway Island separated by marsh and tidal creeks. The refuge is bordered by the Wilmington River and Wassaw Sound to the north and the Vernon River and Ossabaw Sound to the south and encompasses the barrier island, two smaller islands known collectively as Little Wassaw Island, and a few hammocks.

Fishing, collecting shells and wildlife, biking, and camping are illegal on the beach of the island.

== Fort Morgan ==
At the northern end of the Wassaw Beach, facing the ocean, are the ruins of Fort Morgan from the Spanish–American War, built in 1898 by Second Lieutenant Henry Sims Morgan of the U.S. Army Corps of Engineers. The fort is made from cement and granite gravel, with small clam shells embedded in the walls. The ruins are slowly deteriorating as tidal forces and shifting sands have caused sections to crumble under their own weight. The tidal action of the beach leaves much of the ruins exposed some years and other years much of it appears to have been buried under several feet of sand.

Sometimes the corroded remains of the bolts which held the two 4.7-inch rapid fire cannon mounts are clearly visible in their circular pattern located on either side of the main bunker. These two cannons were intended to defend Savannah against a possible approach by the Spanish via the Wilmington River. The fort was the largest single fortification built specifically for the Spanish–American War and was constructed by civilians under the guidance of the US Army Corps of Engineers.

As the ruins are a prominent feature easily visible from other coastal islands to the north, the top of the bunker has an official USGS Survey marker embedded in the concrete roof.

Since Hurricane Irma in 2017 the surrounding beach has eroded, leaving the structure approximately 40 yards off of the beach at low tide.

== Airplane crash ==
According to the NTSB report, At 9:30 on July 4, 1980, a mosquito control Beach C18S tail number N35MS twin-engine airplane on a flight from Johns Island, South Carolina with a destination of Kings Bay, Georgia, crashed on the south end of the island killing both pilot and copilot. The pilot was 50 years old and had over 8,000 hours flight time. Both pilots were incapacitated at the time of the uncontrolled descent.

NTSB remarks: Aircraft observed in shallow descent til impact. DIBROM 14 on board that when atomized produces blinding fumes.

== Wildlife ==
=== Mammals and reptiles ===
- White-tail deer
- Wild boar
- Alligator
- Loggerhead sea turtle
- Armadillo
- Snake
- Dolphin

=== Birds ===
- Bald eagle
- Egrets
- Herons
- Peregrine falcon
- Piping plover
- Wood stork
- Migratory birds
- Various shore birds
