= H. Neill Wilson =

American architect (1855–1927)

Henry Neill Wilson
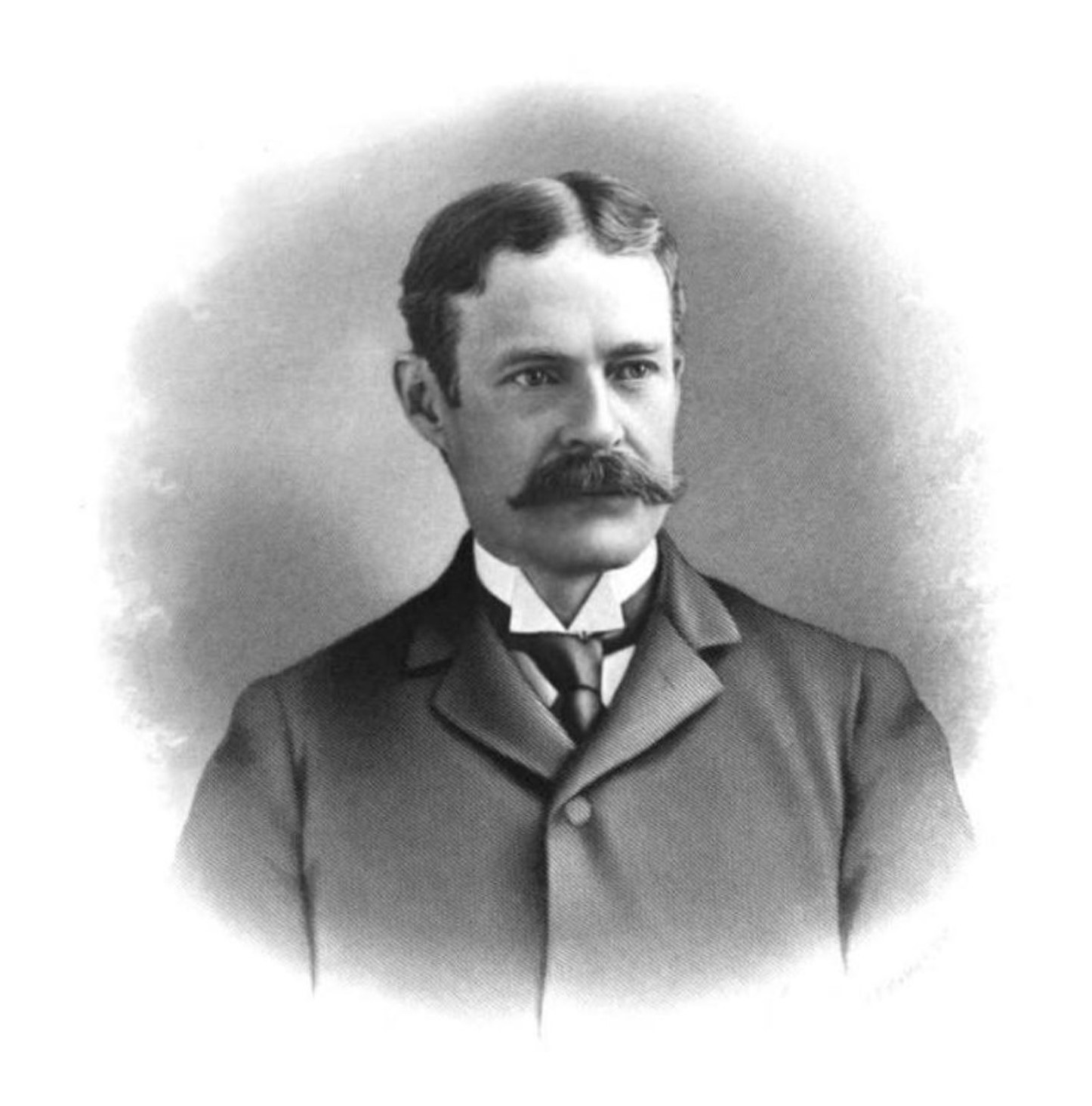
- Born: May 1, 1855; Glendale, Ohio
- Died: 1926; Pittsfield, Massachusetts
- Occupation: Architect

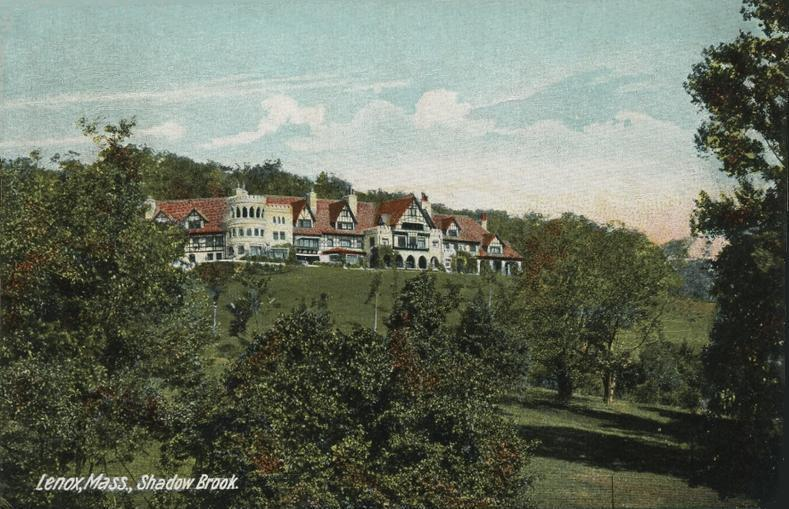
A 1908 postcard of Shadowbrook, built in 1893 for Anson Phelps Stokes who hired Frederick Law Olmsted to design the 900 acre grounds

H. (Henry) Neill Wilson (1855 in Glendale, Ohio – 1926 in Pittsfield, Massachusetts) was an architect with his father James Keys Wilson in Cincinnati, Ohio; on his own in Minneapolis, Minnesota; and for most of his career in Pittsfield, Massachusetts. The buildings he designed include the Rookwood Pottery building in Ohio and several summer cottages in Berkshire County, Massachusetts.

== Career ==
H. Neill Wilson started his career working for his father, a Cincinnati architect, in 1873. He moved on after seven years and established himself in Minneapolis, Minnesota in 1879 where a building boom was under way.

Wilson moved to Pittsfield, Massachusetts in 1885 and did several projects in Berkshire County. He worked in the Northeast until his death in 1926. He was elected as Fellow of the American Institute of Architects in February 1887.

== Noted works ==
In Ohio, Wilson's Rookwood Pottery building remains, although it was expanded after initial construction, as well as the Glendale Lyceum (ca. 1891) building.

His "splendid" Berkshire, County "cottages" were featured in an illustrated book by Jackson and Gilder. The Shadowbrook residence where Andrew Carnegie also lived and died was massive. It was destroyed by a fire in 1956. It was rebuilt, but according to the Biographical Dictionary of Cincinnati Architects, the newer structure is not up to par with the original.

Of his work in Pittsfield, Massachusetts, the William Russell Allen House and Pilgrim Memorial Church and Parish House are still standing and are listed on the National Register of Historic Places. The Berkshire County Home for Aged Women building (1888) and Red Lion Inn, Pittsfield, Massachusetts also remain.

In redesigning the 1773 Red Lion Inn building in 1897 following "a devastating fire" that started in the pastry kitchen, Wilson designed an 80-room building with a separate kitchen building.

Chicago lawyer Wirt Dexter Walker hired him in 1890 to design his cottage.

== Personal life ==
Wilson married Olivia Lovell.

== Projects ==
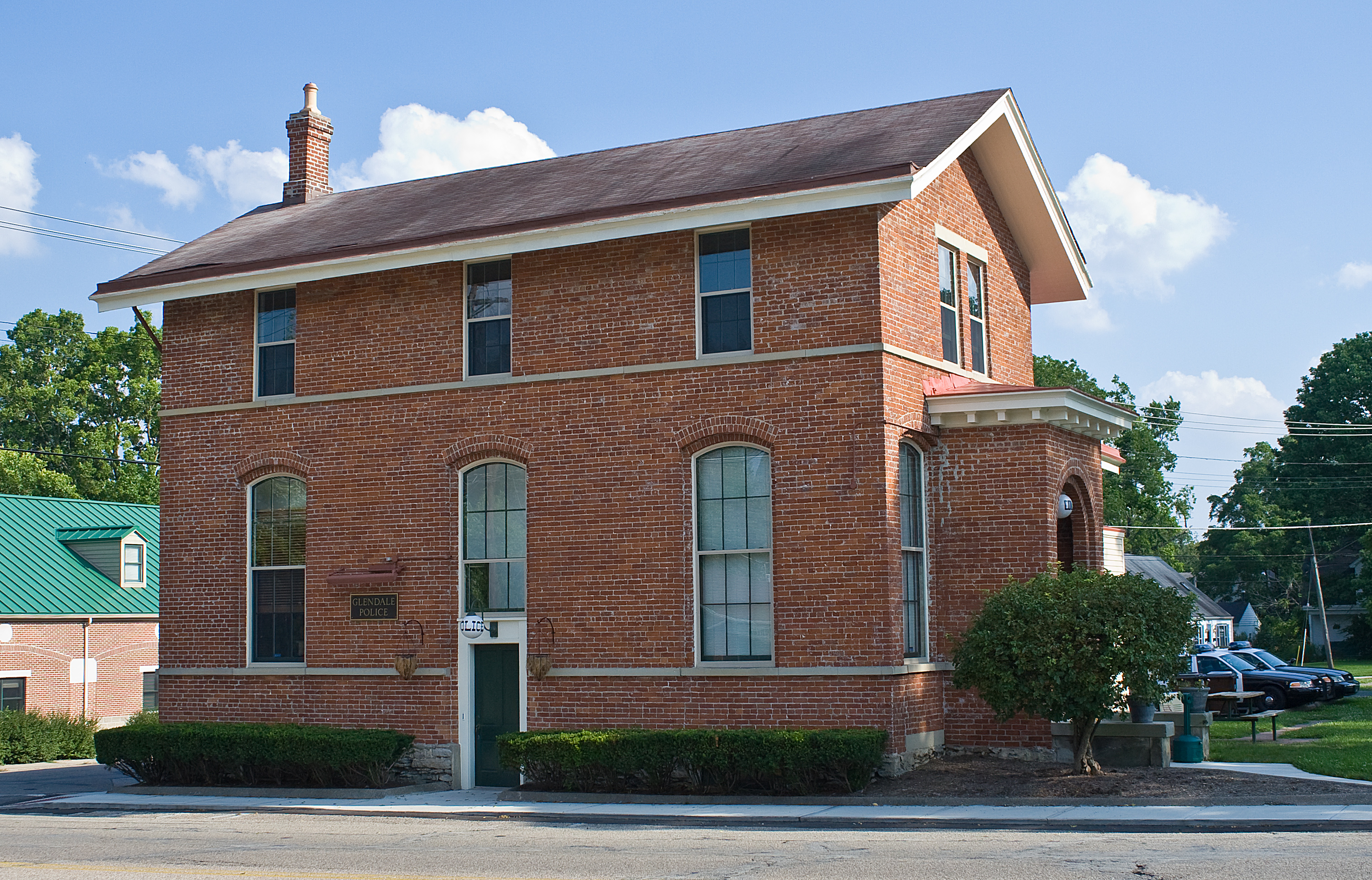
Glendale Town Hall and Police Station (now Glendale Police Station)

- Glendale Town Hall and Police Station of 1871, an Italianate architecture building, is his earliest credited work. It is listed on the U.S. National Register of Historic Places. It was replaced as town hall by Samuel Hannaford’s building that remains in use.
- Red Lion Inn, Pittsfield, Massachusetts (1897) in Stockbridge, Massachusetts, a rebuilding project after the 1773 building was destroyed by fire.
- Rookwood Pottery (constructed 1891 - 1892), the "original part", in an early Tudor Revival architecture and Arts & Crafts architecture style. The building at 1077 Celestial, Mt. Adams, Ohio was expanded during the early 20th Century by the architectural firm of Elzner & Anderson.
- Leonard Beckwith House, acquired and occupied late in the 20th Century as the DeSisto School (1892) in Stockbridge, MA
- Plan for Wirt Dexter Walker summer residence on West Shore of Lake Onota
- The Orchard in Berkshire County (1899)
- Shadowbrook (1893), also known as Shadowbrook Castle, an estate in Lenox, Massachusetts that was commissioned by Anson Phelps Stokes in 1891 at a cost of one million dollars. It was purchased in 1917 by Andrew Carnegie, who died there in 1919. The 100 room house burned in 1956 and was rebuilt for the Society of Jesus "with lesser quality of construction". It may have been the largest private residence ever built in America when it was completed. The Shadow Brook Farm area on Lenox West Road on MA 183 near Bucks Lane in Stockbridge Massachusetts was listed as a historic district on the National Register of Historic Places.
- Lakeside in Berkshire County (1894)
- Blythewood (Massachusetts), a 450-acre (1.8 km^{2}) estate that included outbuildings, laundry facilities, servants quarters, superintendent's residence, two barns, two farm houses, dairy, coach house, wood house, gate house, greenhouse, and gardener's residence. The cottage had 12 bedrooms, 7 bathrooms, electric lights and internal and a contemporary modern style.
- Ten Eyck Hotel, later known as the Sheraton Ten Eyck, in Albany, New York. A "grand old" hotel building that catered to elites in its day before it was imploded in the mid-1970s as part of the Hotel Ten Eyck Project to make way a bank building. A brown brick Hilton Hotel took "its revered place in the old heart of the capital city" before Omni Hotels took over the property which later became a Crowne Plaza hotel.
- Interlaken (Massachusetts) (1894) design in Lenox, Massachusetts for D. W. Bishop
- Wilson is believed to have "delineated" James W. McLaughlin’s Benjamin H. Cox House (ca. 1884) on the southeast corner of East McMillan and Highland avenues in Mt. Auburn, Ohio. It was demolished in 2006
- William Russell Allen House (1885) in Pittsfield. Built as a summer cottage for Allen, a Missouri railroad and a granite quarry owner, it is "a rare example of American Queen Anne architecture because of its terra cotta tile exterior, the hand-painted ceiling, the fireplaces with polished onyx marble and cast bronze, and stained glass windows." The William Russell Allen House at 359 East Street in Pittsfield Massachusetts is listed on the National Register of Historic Places.
- W.P. Burbank House (1887) in Pittsfield It was included in American Architect and Building News VOLUME XXII JULY-DECEMBER, 1887 (615).
- D.W. Bishop House (1888) in Lenox, Massachusetts
- [[William C. [Cooper] Procter House]] (1889) in Pittsfield
- Glendale Lyceum, (ca. 1891) a Richardsonian Romanesque style brick building on Congress Avenue in Glendale, Ohio that remains "largely intact".
- Plans for Brightwood Hall at 334 Bristol, Connecticut
- Berkshire County Home for Aged Women (1888), later a retirement home, at 89 South Street in Pitsfield. Built in a Richardsonian Romanesque style, it is one of the oldest continually operating nursing homes in Massachusetts.
- Pilgrim Memorial Church and Parish House at 249 Wahconah Street in Pittsfield, Massachusetts. Listed on the National Register of Historic Places
- Wollison-Shipton Building, Pittsfield, Massachusetts.
- Hoosac Savings Bank Building (ca. 1893), which includes "intricate terra cotta detailing" North Adams, Massachusetts and cost $60,000 to build. The bank remains in business and was recently renovated and restored.
