= Shadow Brook Farm Historic District =

Historic district in Massachusetts, United States

- U.S. National Register of Historic Places
- U.S. Historic district
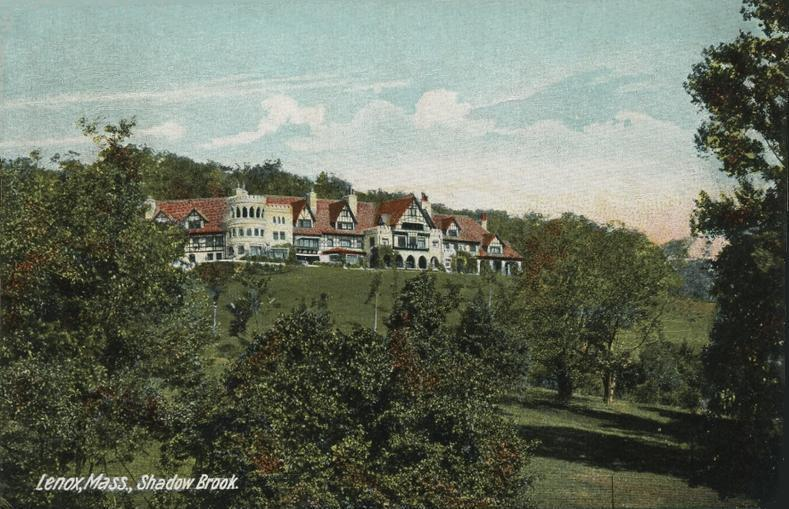
- View of Shadowbrook, from a 1908 postcard

- Location within Massachusetts Location within the United States
- Location: Stockbridge, Massachusetts
- Coordinates: 42°20′42.86″N 73°19′34.74″W
- Area: the Berkshires
- Architect: Wilson, H. Neill
- Architectural style: Tudor Revival
- NRHP reference No.: 88000202
- Added to NRHP: March 10, 1988

Shadow Brook Farm Historic District is a historic district in Stockbridge, Massachusetts, United States. It includes six repurposed farm buildings related to the former Shadow Brook mansion, which was destroyed by fire in 1956. Designed by architect H. Neill Wilson with landscaping by Frederick Law Olmsted, the mansion and farm buildings were built for Anson Phelps Stokes in 1893. Andrew Carnegie acquired Shadowbrook in 1917 and died there in 1919. It served as a Jesuit novitiate from 1922 until 1970. Following the fire, a non-equivalent structure of the same name took its place and currently is home to the Kripalu Center. Today the historic district primarily encompasses Berkshire Country Day School, which acquired its campus from the Stokes family in 1963. The historic district was added to the National Register of Historic Places in 1988.

== History ==
Nathaniel Hawthorne originated the name "Shadow Brook" in reference to a small stream that lies to the west and south of the mansion site. Samuel Gray Ward in 1844 purchased land on the slopes of Baldhead and built a mansion near the site of what was to become Shadowbrook. Ward named his mansion Oakwood.

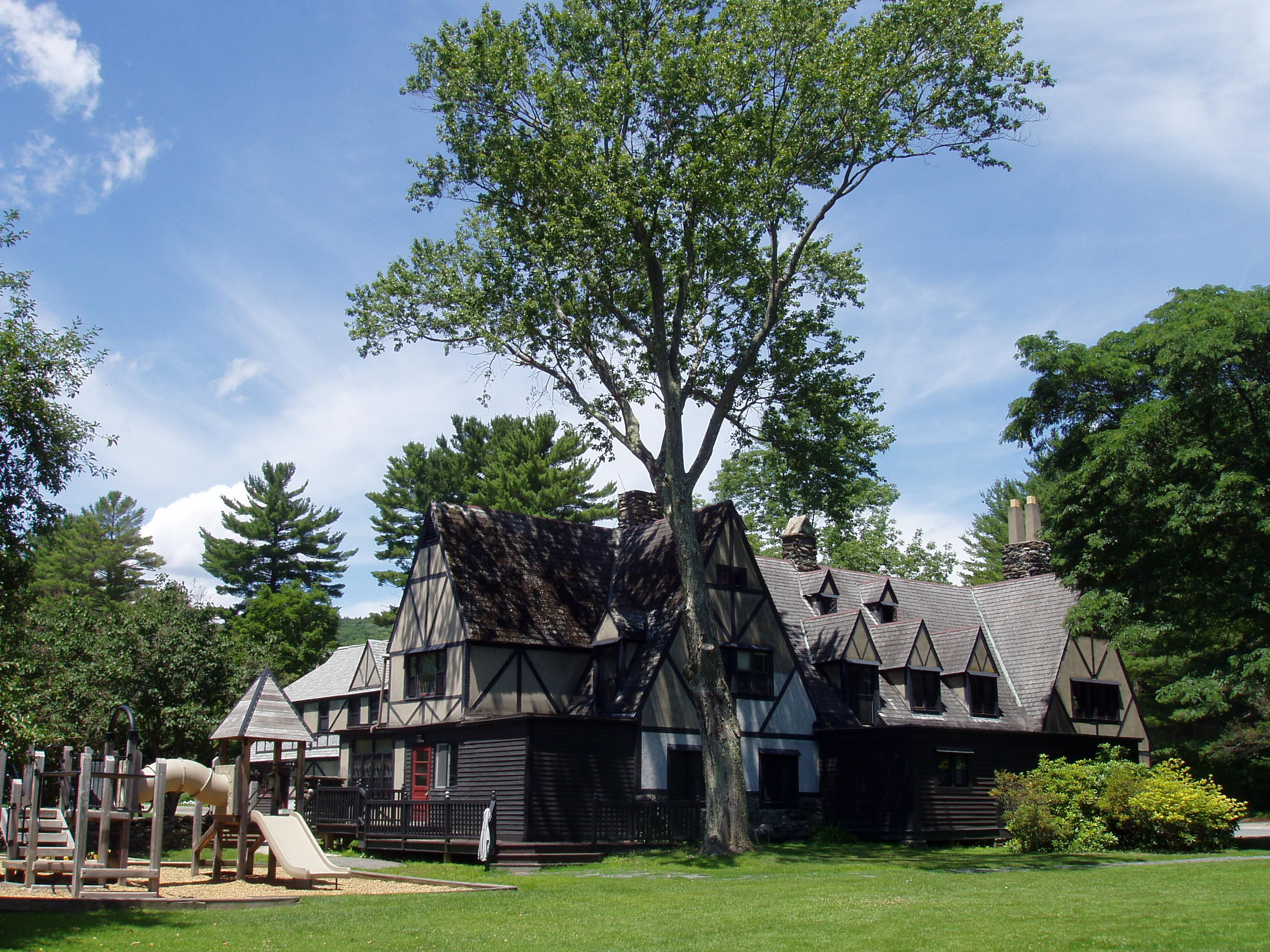

Stokes bought the property in 1892 along with additional land to the south and north, assembling an estate of 1,500 acres (610 ha). The Oakwood building was demolished except for its east wing, and Stokes built his mansion on a ledge 100 yards (90 m) west and 30 feet (9 m) lower. The new structure, completed in 1893 at a cost of $500,000, was shaped like the letter 'L' with its point aimed south and comprised two dominant styles involving English Tudor timbering and stone. The vista from the main house included a view to the south of Stockbridge Bowl, West Stockbridge Mountain, Rattlesnake Hill, Monument Mountain and Mount Everett. Various timbered farm buildings were completed as part of the estate in the valley below, where members of the Stokes family continued to live at least until the 1950s. Anson Stokes crushed his leg in a riding accident on the property and, following its amputation, left the mansion for Darien, Connecticut, in 1898. The estate was mostly vacant until the fall of 1905, when it was sold to Spencer P. Shotter, who departed in 1912. The wife of a Vanderbilt family member leased the property briefly in 1916 following her husband's death, and the mansion was sold in 1916 by Shotter's debtors to Andrew Carnegie for $300,000.

Carnegie had purchased what was regarded at the time to be the second largest private residence in the United States. The estate was among the most prominent examples of the Gilded Age in the Berkshires. Carnegie died at Shadowbrook in 1919, and the Society of Jesus acquired the property three years later to serve as a novitiate for training Jesuit priests.

=== Fire and later history ===
Shadowbrook's main house was destroyed in a fire on March 9, 1956, that claimed the lives of four of its 150 residents. Two more residents subsequently died of injuries from the incident. Because of the building's high cost for upkeep and other practical difficulties, architectural plans for its replacement had already been made prior to the fire. These designs were criticized by a number of senior Jesuit residents at the time, one of whom described the new building as "a monumental mediocrity."

The replacement building, 400 yards (370 m) west of Shadowbrook's ruins, was completed and in use by 1958 "with a nondescript brick and concrete exterior and much painted cinderblock inside" according to Shea. An editor's postscript to Shea's work notes that in 1970 the novitiate moved to the Boston area. The building then stood empty until 1983 when it was sold to a Hindu ashram that established the Kripalu Center, a yoga, health and wellness retreat center on the property.

In 1956 Francis X. Shea, a priest who had trained at Shadowbrook, wrote an account of the Shadowbrook mansion's history and its destruction which was published posthumously in 2009 by the Society of Jesus.

== See also ==
- National Register of Historic Places listings in Berkshire County, Massachusetts
