= Wilmington River =

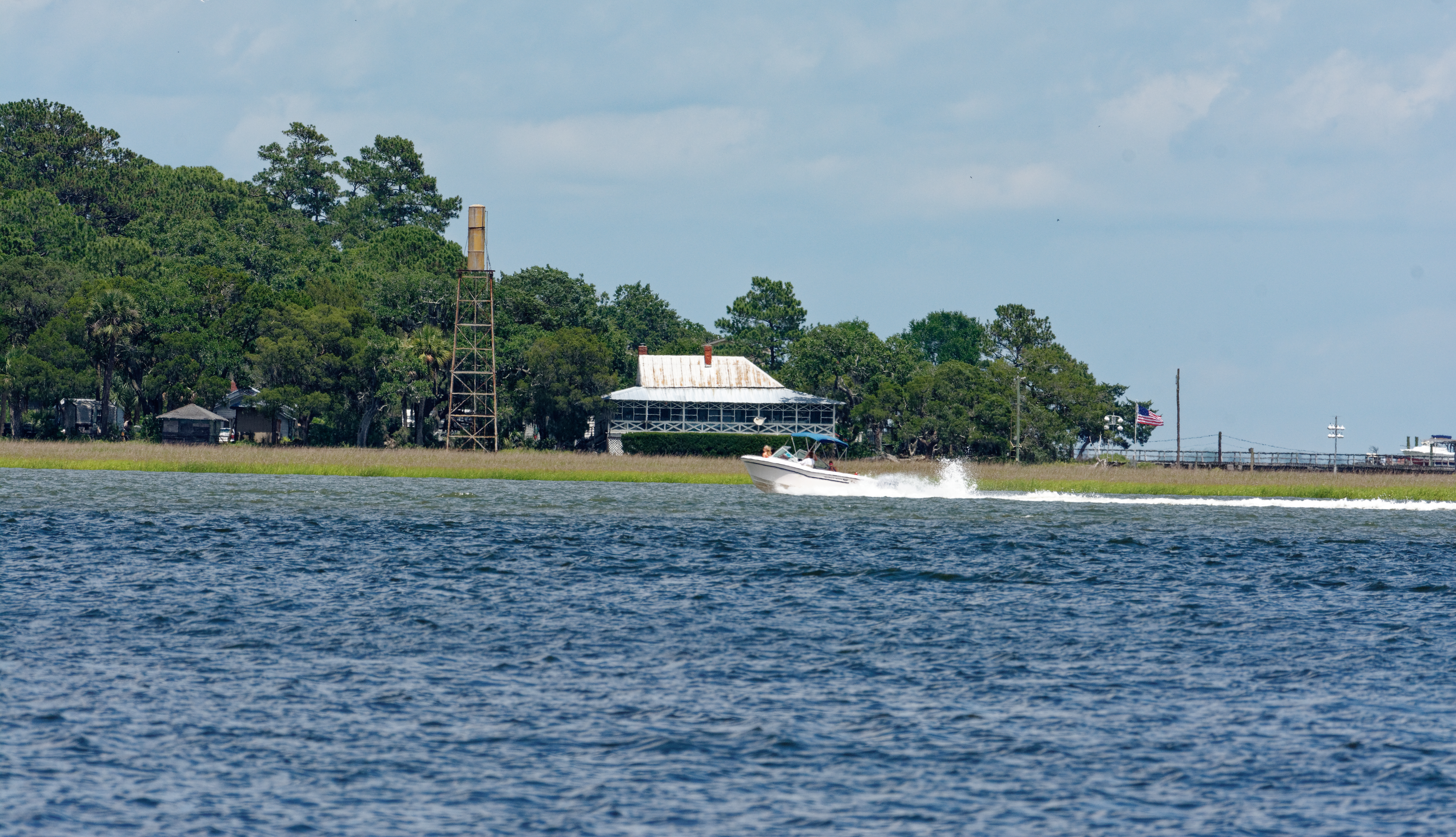
- The Wilmington River - Wilmington Island is seen from Skidaway Island

- Location of mouth

Location
- Country: United States
- State: Georgia

Physical characteristics
- Source
  - location: Georgia
- Mouth
  - coordinates: 31.92105°N 80.93761°W
  - elevation: 0 ft (0 m)

The Wilmington River is a 17.3-mile-long (27.8 km) tidal river in the U.S. state of Georgia. It was originally called St. Augustine's Creek. A creek of the same name exists to the northwest of downtown Savannah.

The Wilmington River flows through Chatham County along the east side of the cities of Savannah and Thunderbolt, Georgia. At its north end, it connects with the Savannah River, then travels southwest past Savannah, then turns southeast and ends in Wassaw Sound, an arm of the Atlantic Ocean. South of Savannah, it passes between several islands, including Whitemarsh Island, Wilmington Island and Cabbage Island to the east, and Dutch Island, Skidaway Island, and Wassaw Island to the west and south.

== See also ==
- List of rivers of Georgia
- Wilmington Island, Georgia
