= Thunderbolt, Georgia =

Town in Georgia, United States

- Town
- Seal

- Location in Chatham County and the state of Georgia
- Coordinates: 32°1′56″N 81°3′6″W
- Country: United States
- State: Georgia
- County: Chatham

Government
  - Mayor: Dana Williams

Area
  - Total: 1.56 sq mi (4.04 km^{2})
  - Land: 1.34 sq mi (3.48 km^{2})
  - Water: 0.22 sq mi (0.56 km^{2})
- Elevation: 20 ft (6.1 m)

Population (2020)
  - Total: 2,556
  - Density: 1,903.3/sq mi (734.87/km^{2})
- Time zone: UTC-5 (Eastern (EST))
  - Summer (DST): UTC-4 (EDT)
- ZIP codes: 31404, 31410
- Area code: 912
- FIPS code: 13-76364
- GNIS feature ID: 0333226
- Website: thunderboltga.org

Thunderbolt is a town located in Chatham County, Georgia, United States, approximately five miles southeast of downtown Savannah. As of the 2020 census, the town had a total population of 2,556. It is part of the Savannah Metropolitan Statistical Area. Thunderbolt runs along the western shore of the Wilmington River (a tidal river that is part of the U.S. Intracoastal Waterway). The town is important to Georgia's shrimping industry, with scores of docks for shrimping trawlers. The town's picturesque atmosphere and seafood restaurants draw many local visitors.

== History ==
An early variant name was "Warsaw". The Georgia General Assembly incorporated the town as "Warsaw" in 1856. Coincidentally, Casimir Pulaski, who was born in Warsaw, Poland, died in Thunderbolt. An act of legislature officially changed the town's name to "Thunderbolt" in 1921.

According to tradition, Thunderbolt was named from an incident when lightning strike caused a spring to open up.

Fort Thunderbolt, colloquially referred to as the Thunderbolt Battery, was built to protect the city of Savannah from invading Union forces advancing from Whitemarsh Island.

== Geography ==
Thunderbolt is located at 32°1'56" North, 81°3'6" West (32.032111, -81.051733).

According to the United States Census Bureau, the town has a total area of 1.5 square miles (3.8 km^{2}), of which 1.3 square miles (3.3 km^{2}) is land and 0.2 square mile (0.5 km^{2}) is water.

== Demographics ==
Historical population
Census	Pop.	Note	%±
1910	543		—
1920	721		32.8%
1930	802		11.2%
1940	886		10.5%
1950	1,238		39.7%
1960	1,925		55.5%
1970	2,750		42.9%
1980	2,165		−21.3%
1990	2,786		28.7%
2000	2,340		−16.0%
2010	2,668		14.0%
2020	2,556		−4.2%
U.S. Decennial Census

=== 2020 census ===
As of the 2020 census, Thunderbolt had a population of 2,556. The median age was 43.5 years. 16.5% of residents were under the age of 18 and 21.4% of residents were 65 years of age or older. For every 100 females there were 90.7 males, and for every 100 females age 18 and over there were 88.3 males age 18 and over.

96.4% of residents lived in urban areas, while 3.6% lived in rural areas.

There were 1,146 households in Thunderbolt, of which 21.3% had children under the age of 18 living in them. Of all households, 31.8% were married-couple households, 24.1% were households with a male householder and no spouse or partner present, and 35.2% were households with a female householder and no spouse or partner present. About 36.9% of all households were made up of individuals and 12.5% had someone living alone who was 65 years of age or older. There were 516 families residing in the town.

There were 1,316 housing units, of which 12.9% were vacant. The homeowner vacancy rate was 3.0% and the rental vacancy rate was 7.2%.

Thunderbolt racial composition as of 2020
Race	Num.	Perc.
White (non-Hispanic)	1,376	53.83%
Black or African American (non-Hispanic)	639	25.0%
Native American	1	0.04%
Asian	81	3.17%
Other/Mixed	115	4.5%
Hispanic or Latino	344	13.46%

== See also ==
- Samuel Bowen, who grew the first soybeans introduced to North America in Thunderbolt.
