= Veterans Parkway (Savannah, Georgia) =

- Southwest Bypass

Route information
- Length: 6.1 mi (9.8 km)
- Existed: 1996–present

Major junctions
- South end: SR 204 in Georgetown
- North end: I-516 / SR 21 in Savannah

Location
- Country: United States
- State: Georgia
- Counties: Chatham

Highway system
- Chatham County Roads

Veterans Parkway (also known as Southwest Bypass) is a 6.1-mile (9.8 km) long freeway in the Savannah metropolitan area, connecting Georgetown with downtown Savannah, completely within Chatham County. It is not a state route, nor is it maintained by the Georgia Department of Transportation (GDOT); it is one of a handful of county-maintained freeways in Georgia. Other county maintained freeways include Ronald Reagan Parkway, Harry S. Truman Parkway, and a portion of the East–West Connector in Cobb County. Most of the route parallels Hunter Army Airfield (Hunter AAF), which is located to the east of the highway. At its northern terminus, Interstate 516 (I-516) east and State Route 21 (SR 21) south provides access to Hunter AAF. On SR 204 it is not signed as Veterans Parkway, it is signed "Downtown Savannah".

== Route description ==
Veterans Parkway begins at an interchange with SR 204 (Abercorn Street) in Georgetown. It curves to the northeast, crossing over the Little Ogeechee River. The highway curves to the north to an interchange with Chatham Parkway. Then, it curves to a nearly-due-east routing to meet its northern terminus, an interchange with I-516/SR 21 (William F. Lynes Parkway) on the southwestern edge of downtown Savannah.

All of Veterans Parkway is included as part of the National Highway System, a system of roadways important to the nation's economy, defense, and mobility.

== History ==
Veterans Parkway was established in 1996 along the same alignment as it runs today.

== Exit list ==
The entire route is in Chatham County. All exits are unnumbered.

Location	mi	km	Destinations	Notes
Georgetown	0.0	0.0	SR 204 (Abercorn Street) to I-95 – Southside Savannah	Southern terminus
Little Ogeechee River	1.7	2.7	Unnamed bridge; crossing over some railroad tracks of CSX and the Little Ogeechee River	
	5.0	8.0	Chatham Parkway	
Savannah	6.1	9.8	I-516 (Lynes Parkway / SR 21 / SR 421) – Hunter AAF	Northern terminus; exit 2 on I-516
1.000 mi = 1.609 km; 1.000 km = 0.621 mi
