= Kalen DeLoach =

American football player (born 2000)

Profile
- Position: Linebacker

Personal information
- Born: November 28, 2000 (age 25); Savannah, Georgia, U.S.
- Listed height: 5 ft 11 in (1.80 m)
- Listed weight: 216 lb (98 kg)

Career information
- High school: Islands (Whitemarsh Island, Georgia)
- College: Florida State (2019–2023)
- NFL draft: 2024: undrafted

Career history
- Tampa Bay Buccaneers (2024)*; Jacksonville Jaguars (2024)*; Arlington / Dallas Renegades (2025–2026)
- * Offseason or practice squad member only

Awards and highlights
- First-team All-ACC (2023)
- Stats at Pro Football Reference

Kalen DeLoach (born November 28, 2000) is an American professional football linebacker. He played college football for the Florida State Seminoles.

== Early life ==
DeLoach attended Islands High School in Whitemarsh Island, Georgia. As a senior, he had 156 tackles, seven sacks and two sacks. He was selected to play in the 2019 Under Armour All-America Game. DeLoach committed to Florida State University to play college football.

== College career ==
In his first year at Florida State in 2019, DeLoach played in eight games and had three tackles. In 2020, he played in all nine games with one start and recorded seven tackles. He became a full-time starter in 2021, starting 11 of 12 games and finishing the season with 69 tackles, one sack and one interception. DeLoach started all 13 games in 2022, recording 65 tackles and three sacks. He returned to Florida State as a starter in 2023.

== Professional career ==
Pre-draft measurables
Height	Weight	Arm length	Hand span	Wingspan	40-yard dash	10-yard split	20-yard split	Vertical jump	Broad jump	Bench press
5 ft 11 1/2 in (1.82 m)	210 lb (95 kg)	31 1/2 in (0.80 m)	8 5/8 in (0.22 m)	6 ft 2 7/8 in (1.90 m)	4.47 s	1.59 s	2.61 s	30.5 in (0.77 m)	9 ft 11 in (3.02 m)	23 reps
All values from NFL Combine/Pro Day

=== Tampa Bay Buccaneers ===
DeLoach signed with the Tampa Bay Buccaneers as an undrafted free agent on May 10, 2024. He was also selected by the Arlington Renegades in the third round of the 2024 UFL draft on July 17. He was waived on August 27. He was re-signed to the practice squad on October 1, but released four weeks later.

=== Jacksonville Jaguars ===
On December 17, 2024, DeLoach was signed to the Jacksonville Jaguars practice squad.

=== Arlington/ Dallas Renegades ===
On April 20, 2025, DeLoach signed with the Arlington Renegades of the United Football League (UFL).

On January 13, 2026, DeLoach was drafted by the Dallas Renegades.
