= Georgetown, Georgia =

Georgetown is the name of some places in the U.S. state of Georgia:

- Georgetown, Chatham County, Georgia
- Georgetown, Quitman County, Georgia
