= Oatland Island Wildlife Center =

Educational center and wildlife preserve in Georgia, US

Coordinates: 32.049159°N 81.0244997°W

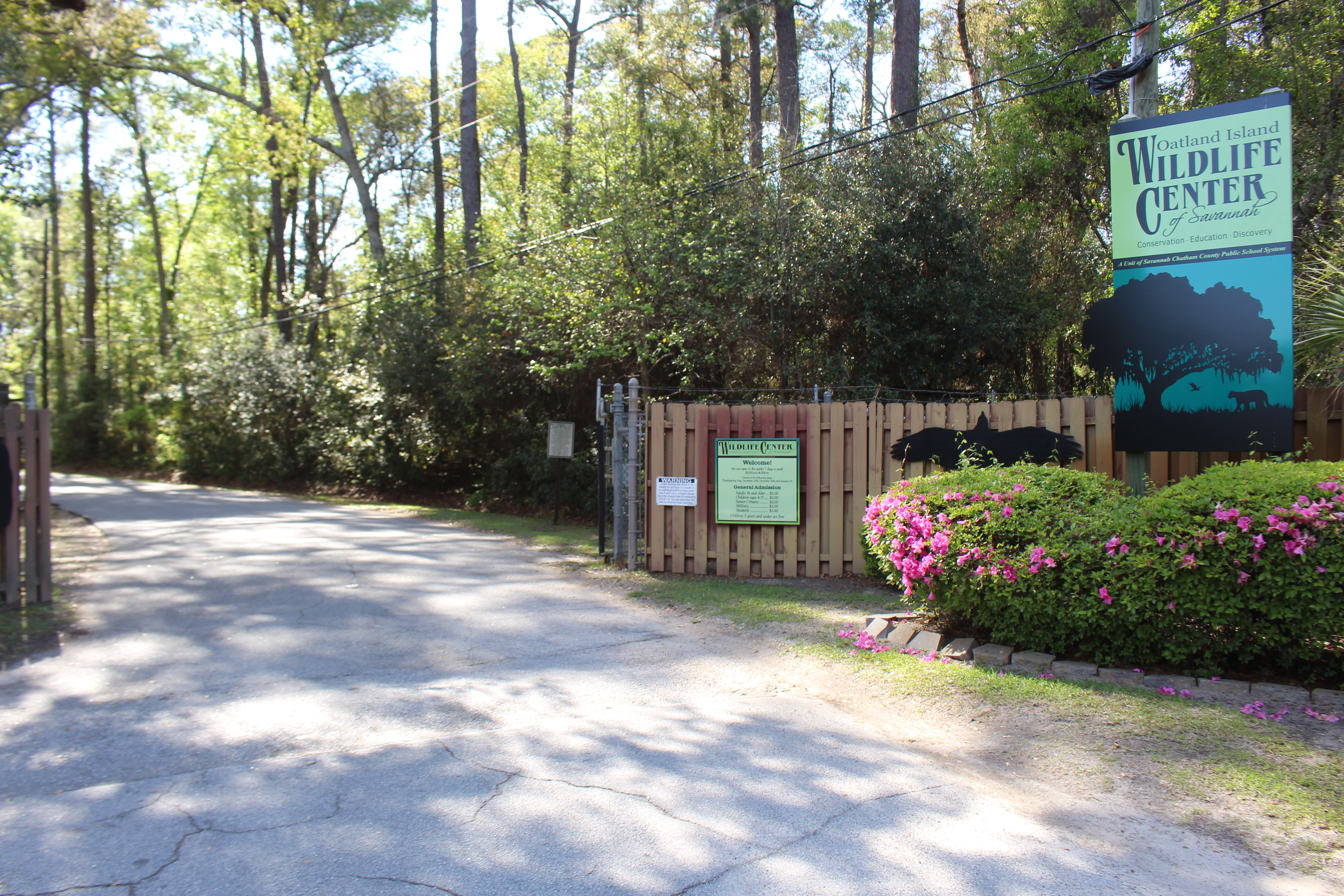
Entrance to Oatland Island Wildlife Center

The Oatland Island Wildlife Center is a 100-acre wildlife preserve and environmental education complex located on Oatland Island in Chatham County, Georgia, near Savannah. The island itself is one of the Sea Islands, which are barrier islands along the southeastern coast of the United States. Bounded by St. Augustine Creek to the north, the Wilmington River to the west, and Richardson Creek to the south, Oatland lies just north of Whitemarsh Island. It is home to over 150 animals and some 40 species native to the Georgia coast. Originally part of a cotton plantation, the island once held a retirement center for railroad workers and a hospital and laboratory for the U.S. Public Health Service. It was later transferred to the Savannah-Chatham County Public School System (SCCPSS) for use as an educational resource and learning facility. The wildlife center remains under the control and management of SCCPSS.

== History of the Island ==
Oatland Island was originally owned by Revolutionary War soldier and land speculator, John McQueen. Memorialized in Eugenia Price's book Don Juan McQueen, Oatland Island was the only property which was not reclaimed when McQueen fled to Florida to avoid debtors' prison. John's wife, Anne Smith, and their respective families continued to live on and visit the island, and cotton and sugar cane were both planted with varying degrees of success. John and Anne's daughter, Eliza Mackay, received several letters from her husband Robert Mackay regarding the conditions of the crops on Oatland Island which are compiled in the book Letters of Robert MacKay to His Wife: Written from Ports in America and England, 1795–1816.

== Railway conductors home ==
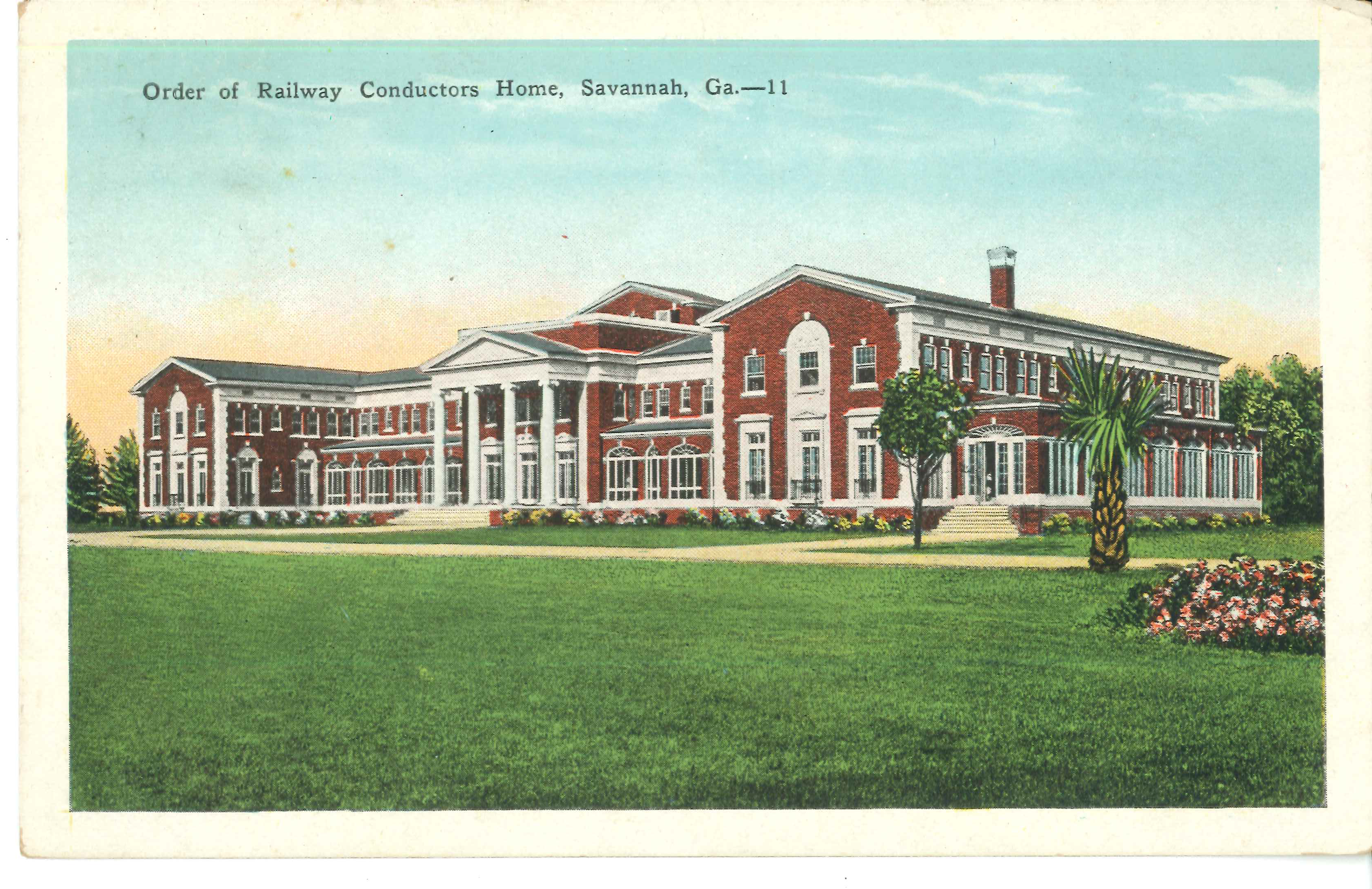
A 1927 postcard depicting the Railway Conductors Home, Oatland Island, Savannah, Georgia

In March 1926, Oatland Island was selected by the Order of Railway Conductors to be the site for the construction of a new $1M retirement home for indigent and "aged conductors and their wives" and widows of conductors. That December, it was announced that in addition to the construction of the home, a bridge would be built to connect the island in a more efficient way to Savannah. The contract was granted to the James Stewart Company, based in New York City, with construction to begin in March 1927. Otis Elevator Company received the elevator contract. The finished brick building was two stories high, containing 62 bedrooms, 36 bathrooms, communal living and dining spaces, and a medical department with surgical capabilities. The home opened in November 1927, with the first group of 25 conductors and their wives arriving in Savannah by train.

With decreased utility because of the Social Security Act and railroad retirement acts, the home was permanently closed in 1940.

== Medical facilities ==
In October 1942, the Georgia State board was considering how to mitigate a national venereal disease epidemic. February 1943, an application was approved by Mayor Thomas Gamble to convert the home to a federal venereal disease detention facility run by the U.S. Public Health Service. In June of the same year, Federal Judge A.B. Lovett formalized the possession transfer of the conductors' home and 100 acres to the government. The building underwent construction to retrofit and increase the size to accommodate 200 patients, many of them prostitutes, from Georgia and the bordering states of Florida and South Carolina. The Federal Works Agency approved Federal funding under the Lanham Act, allocated to curb the growing infection rate with plans to treat over 2,000 patients in one year's time.

Patients were continuously treated until 1944, when the facility began treating patients for syphilis and gonorrhea using penicillin, which had been used successfully as a treatment option the year prior by Dr. John Mahoney. With the rapid adoption of penicillin as a treatment course, the U.S. Public Health Service no longer needed to maintain the hospital as a detention center.

== Research laboratory ==
Control of the medical facilities was transferred to the Malaria Control in War Areas (MCWA) division, which converted the hospital into a laboratory for the purpose of studying malaria to promote safer U.S. military camp conditions overseas. The island's low-elevation marshes and salt water provided ample grounds for vector control tests and there was an interest in developing methods of mosquito control through the usage of DDT as a pesticide. DDT showed promise as a mosquito-elimination product, and initial treatments were applied in 1944 to a small sampling of homes and dairies. By 1945, this treatment had expanded to include other properties across the Savannah area.

Additionally, in 1945 the MCWA formally restructured and the following year became the Communicable Disease Center, later the Centers for Disease Control and Prevention (CDC). With this reorganization, the Savannah laboratory became a field office of the CDC known as the Technical Development Laboratories, and expanded to study "insect-borne and related diseases, including malaria, typhus, dengue and yellow fever". By 1949, some mosquito and housefly populations were showing a resistance to DDT. In 1955, chemists working at the lab developed dichlorvos, or DDVP, that was effective against DDT-resistant pests. Dichlorvos became the active ingredient in Shell "no pest strips" and household flea collars. The CDC closed its Savannah field office in 1973, and the laboratory was relocated to the CDC headquarters in Atlanta, leaving the island unutilized.

== Oatland Island Education Center ==
A local teacher and administrator, Tony Cope, along with Savannah school board members lobbied for the surplus property to be turned into an environmental education center, winning the bid with an agreement that the government would maintain interest in the property cooperatively with the public school system for a period of 30 years to pilot the proposed education program. In August 1974, Oatland Island Education Center opened to the public.

Several programs were launched, including an alternative education program for pupils assigned long term suspensions, and both students and the Youth Conservation Corps played integral roles in building out the animal habitats, trails, docks, and marine monitoring station on the island. In 1975, Savannah Area Tech relocated its marine technology program to Oatland Island from Skidaway Island. By 1977, the alternative education program had expanded to accommodate 30 pupils, additional animals were being housed there, and the island was seeing 30,000 visitors annually. As interest in the island increased, Cope introduced a donation of canned dog food for admission.

Two 1800's homestead cabins were donated and reconstructed on the property, as Cope's vision included the recreation of a period correct Georgia heritage farm.

Per the original agreement, the property was fully transferred to the control of Savannah Chatham County Public Schools in 2004 and in 2007, the property was formally renamed the Oatland Island Wildlife Center. In 2023, a ceremony was held to name the main building, now an official visitor center, the Tony Cope Education and Visitor Center.

The Oatland Island Wildlife Center has a two-mile trail loop which takes 20,000 visitors and an additional 20,000 field trip students annually by the animal exhibitions, heritage home site, maritime forest, and wetlands. An important environmental science component of the Savannah Chatham County Public Schools, students and visitors are exposed to local ecology and indigenous animals.
