= Victory Drive (Savannah, Georgia) =

Street in Savannah, Georgia

- Former name: Estill Avenue
- Part of: US 80 / SR 26
- Namesake: Citizens from Savannah and Chatham County who lost their lives in World War I
- Length: 4.5 mi (7.2 km)
- Location: Savannah to Thunderbolt, Georgia
- West end: US 80 / SR 26 in Savannah
- Major junctions: SR 204 in Savannah; Harry S. Truman Parkway in Savannah
- East end: US 80 / SR 26 in Thunderbolt

Victory Drive is a street that extends approximately 4.5 miles (7.2 km) from the Ogeechee Road intersection in western Savannah, Georgia to the central part of Thunderbolt, where it terminates. It is entirely part of U.S. Route 80 (US 80) and Georgia State Route 26 (SR 26).

== History ==
In October 1919, City Engineer William O.D. Rockwell proposed a military memorial boulevard called "Victory Avenue" that would stretch from Waters Avenue to Thunderbolt, in honor of the fallen soldiers from World War I. Victory Drive was once a series of unpaved roads that connected the western edge of Savannah to the small fishing village of Warsaw which, after 1921, was incorporated as the Town of Thunderbolt. The western part of Victory—which was once named King Street—is now renamed 43rd Street. This portion of Victory served as an extension of Estill avenue that is now between Bull Street and Waters Avenue. 43rd street was a block north from Estill Avenue, creating a sharp turn that connected the two sections of the road. 43rd Street, Estill Avenue and Dale Avenue made up the old version of Victory Drive.

=== Great Savannah races ===
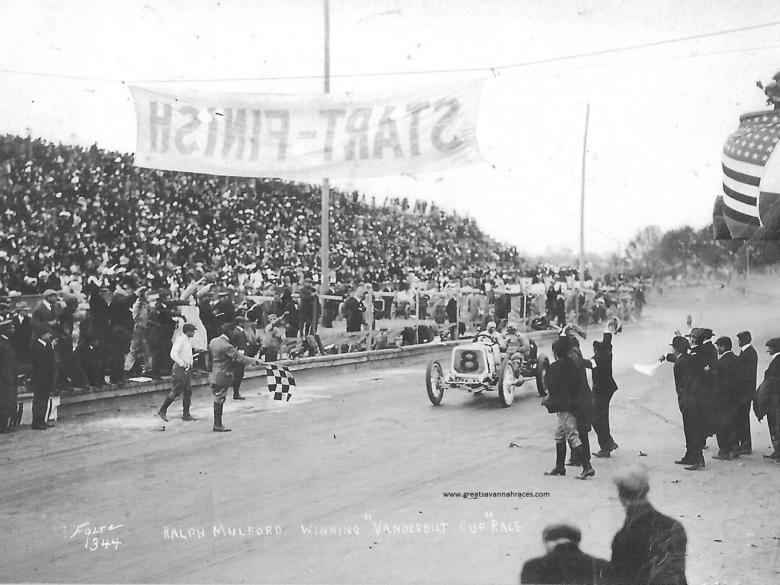
Racer coming toward the finish line in the Great Savannah Races

Throughout the years of 1908-1911, the U.S. International Grand Prix automobile races were held in Savannah. Estill and Dale Avenue was selected by the American Automobile Association (AAA) as the location for the first ever U.S. International Grand Prix Race and was the final stretch of the racetrack. These races brought many economic benefits to the City of Savannah. The roadways were paved with oiled gravel and Augusta gravel—a mixture of clay and coarse sand—which helped the racers reach speeds surpassing 100 miles per hour (160 km/h). In 1912, however, the AAA decided to relocate to Long Island, New York despite its success in Savannah.

==== Effect on real estate ====
The races brought a great opportunity to sell real estate to spectators visiting for the event and improvements around the landscape and the residential development began. Estill Avenue was lined with 475 sabal palmettos planted by the City of Savannah Park and Tree Commission. Harvey Granger president of the Chatham Land and Hotel Company proposed "beautification" of Estill Avenue including the division of Estill Avenue with multiple lanes of travel separated by the iconic medians of Victory Drive. Demolition of the grandstands and the visitor seating began around the time Estill Avenue was divided. After the demolition, the land construction began on luxurious homes and residences along both Estill and Dale Avenue.

=== Redevelopment ===
Harvey Granger commissioned the city's Park and Tree Commission to plant trees and take care of them along Estill Avenue as well to plant trees on the median. Commissioner Oliver T. Bacon saw the success of the plantings, so improvement on Dale Avenue began to take effect as well. In 1913 widening of the avenue and paving began, as well as installation of granite curbing and the development of a landscaped median. It took nine years for the redevelopment to be complete. The granite curbing was placed in 1921 completing Dale Avenue.

== World War I remembrance ==
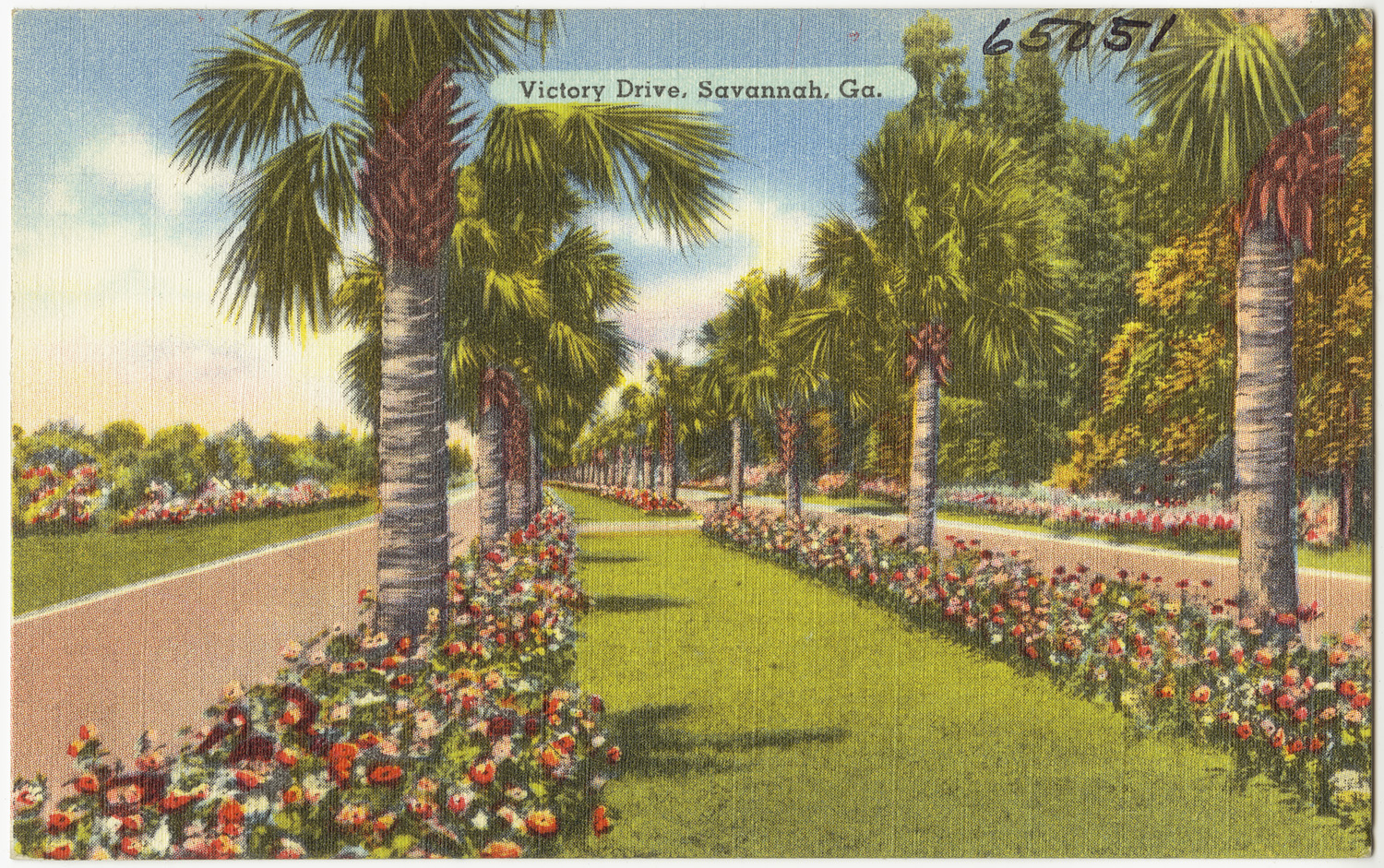
An early rendering of Victory Drive

To honor the fallen soldiers of WW I, palm trees and flowers were planted along the entire median of the street. In 1929 Victory Drive boasted 400 palmetto trees. In 1935, the Park and Tree Commission planted an additional 317 palmetto trees along the historical corridor costing around $2,000. By 1950, 600 palmetto trees were in place. Victory Drive was decorated with approximately 2,800 palmettos, and claimed to be the longest avenue of palms in the nation.
