= Windsor Forest High School =

Public high school in Savannah, Georgia, United States

Location
- 12419 Largo Drive; Savannah, Chatham County, Georgia 31419; United States; 31°58′36″N 81°09′09″W

Information
- Type: Public
- Opened: 1967 (59 years ago)
- School board: Savannah-Chatham County School Board
- School district: Savannah-Chatham County Public Schools
- CEEB code: 112718
- Principal: Joanna Brooks
- Staff: 64.40 (on an FTE basis)
- Grades: 9–12
- Enrollment: 1,012 (2022–2023)
- Student to teacher ratio: 16.71
- Colors: Green and white
- Mascot: Knight
- Accreditation: Southern Association of Colleges and Schools
- Website: wfhs.sccpss.com

Windsor Forest High School is a public high school in the Windsor Forest section of Savannah, Georgia, United States. Managed by the Savannah-Chatham County School Board of Education, its attendance area includes the southside Savannah neighborhoods of Windsor Forest, White Bluff, Wilshire, and Georgetown.

== History ==
Windsor Forest High School opened in the autumn of 1967. It was the city's first air-conditioned high school and included grades 7 through 12.

In 1967, fifth-grade pupils from overcrowded Windsor Forest Elementary were temporarily housed in a wing of the new high school. For several years, Windsor's middle school students were fully drawn from the area south and west of Holland Drive, while its high school students came from a larger attendance zone that stretched north and east to the middle of Montgomery Cross Road. Two court-mandated busing plans (in the summers of 1970 and 1971) markedly changed this attendance area, bringing in minority students from the subdivisions of Cloverdale and Liberty City in Savannah and reassigning some of Windsor's white students to Jenkins High School (1970-71 attendance year) and then to formerly all-black Beach High (from fall 1971 until 1992). With the large-scale integration of the south side in the 1990s, however, Windsor Forest High became the neighborhood school it was before busing. In 1975, middle school grades 7 and 8 were dropped and their students were transferred to new middle schools elsewhere in Chatham County.

In 2015, history teacher Ernie Lee was named Georgia State Teacher of the Year for 2016.

== Notable alumni ==
- Kathy Pham, computer scientist
- Bernard James, professional basketball player (Dallas Mavericks)
- Marty Pevey, former professional baseball player (Montreal Expos)
- Eron Riley, professional football player (Baltimore Ravens, Carolina Panthers, Denver Broncos, New York Jets, Saskatchewan Roughriders)
- Jason Shiell, former professional baseball player (San Diego Padres, Boston Red Sox, Atlanta Braves)
