= Samuel Brown (American football) =

American football player (born 2002)

Sam Brown Jr.
Profile
- Position: Wide receiver

Personal information
- Born: August 15, 2002 (age 24); Savannah, Georgia, U.S.
- Listed height: 6 ft 2 in (1.88 m)
- Listed weight: 200 lb (91 kg)

Career information
- High school: New Hampstead (Bloomingdale, Georgia)
- College: West Virginia (2020–2021); Houston (2022–2023); Miami (2024)
- NFL draft: 2025: undrafted

Career history
- Green Bay Packers (2025)*
- * Offseason or practice squad member only
- Stats at Pro Football Reference

Samuel Brown Jr. (born August 15, 2002) is an American professional football wide receiver. He played college football for the West Virginia Mountaineers, Houston Cougars, and Miami Hurricanes.

== Early life ==
Brown attended New Hampstead High School in Bloomingdale, Georgia, and was rated as a three-star recruit. He originally committed to play college football for the UCF, but switched his commitment to play for the West Virginia Mountaineers over other schools such as Florida, Ole Miss, Colorado, Georgia, Kentucky, Maryland, Michigan, Oregon, Syracuse, Tennessee, and Wake Forest.

== College career ==
=== West Virginia ===
Brown appeared in nine games at West Virginia from 2020 to 2021, recording ten receptions for 108 yards. After the 2021 season, he entered his name into the NCAA transfer portal.

=== Houston ===
Brown transferred to play for the Houston Cougars. In week 6 of the 2022 season, he notched nine receptions for 116 yards in a win over Memphis. Following the regular season finale against Tulsa, Brown slapped Tulsa player Bryson Powers, resulting in his suspension for the team's bowl game. During Brown's first season with the Cougars in 2022 he appeared in 11 games with seven starts, where he hauled in 41 receptions for 471 yards and four touchdowns. In week 10 of the 2023 season, he hauled in nine receptions for 86 yards and a touchdown in a win over Baylor. Brown finished the 2023 season with 62 receptions for 815 yards and three touchdowns, earning Big 12 Conference honorable mention. After the season, he entered his name into the NCAA transfer portal.

=== Miami ===
Brown transferred to play for the Miami Hurricanes. In week 8 of the 2024 season, he hauled in three receptions for 125 yards in a win over Louisville, earning Atlantic Coast Conference (ACC) Receiver of the week honors.

== Professional career ==
Pre-draft measurables
Height	Weight	Arm length	Hand span	40-yard dash	10-yard split	20-yard split	Vertical jump
6 ft 2 1/4 in (1.89 m)	200 lb (91 kg)	31 5/8 in (0.80 m)	9 3/8 in (0.24 m)	4.44 s	1.52 s	2.58 s	41.5 in (1.05 m)
All values from NFL Combine

Brown signed with the Green Bay Packers as an undrafted free agent on May 29, 2025. He was waived/injured on August 5, 2025.
