= Harry S. Truman Parkway =

Highway in Savannah, Georgia

Coordinates: 32.0216°N 81.0888°W

Route information
- Length: 10.8 mi (17.4 km)

Major junctions
- South end: SR 204 in Savannah
- US 80 / SR 26 in Savannah
- North end: President Street in Savannah

Location
- Country: United States
- State: Georgia
- Counties: Chatham

Highway system
- Chatham County Roads

The Harry S. Truman Parkway is a north–south freeway through the Savannah metropolitan area between Georgia State Route 204 (SR 204; Abercorn Street) and President Street. Originally dubbed the Casey Canal Parkway, due to the parallel waterway, the project was renamed after former President Harry S. Truman in the early 1970s after his death in 1972.

The Truman Parkway is not a state route, nor is it maintained by the GDOT: it is one of a handful of county-maintained freeways in Georgia along with the Ronald Reagan Parkway, Veterans Parkway (Southwest Bypass), and a portion of the East–West Connector in Cobb County.

== Route description ==
Truman Parkway begins at an interchange with SR 204 (Abercorn Street) in the south side of Savannah. It has a partial interchange with White Bluff Road and then traverses a 2-mile-long (3.2 km) bridge over the Vernon River. Just past the river, it has an interchange with Whitefield Avenue (Former SR 204 Spur). After an interchange with Montgomery Cross Road, it passes Lake Mayer Park and Allen Paulson Park. Then, it passes the Georgia Regional Medical Center just before a partial interchange with Eisenhower Drive and Beaumont Drive. The parkway curves to the northwest, passing the Bacon Park Tennis Complex, before skirting along the northeast edge of Bacon Park. After that, it meets its first major interchange, that with DeRenne Avenue. This road is a major highway in southern Savannah and leads to Interstate 516 (I-516). Then, the parkway begins traveling in a north-northeast orientation. After passing Memorial University Medical Center is an interchange with Delesseps Avenue. Just east of Daffin Park is an interchange with US 80/SR 26 (Victory Drive). It then begins to travel to the north-northwest and has an interchange with Anderson, Henry, and Wheaton Streets. After this, it skirts along the southwestern edge of Hillcrest Cemetery before curving to the north-northeast. Then, the parkway meets its northern terminus, an interchange with President Street just south of the Savannah River.

All of the Harry Truman Parkway is part of the National Highway System, a system of roadways important to the nation's economy, defense, and mobility.

== History ==
1925:

- June: Walter Stillwell suggested that an area, known then as Cuyler Swamp, be turned into a public park. The second of his nine suggestions is to "Build on one side of the (Casey) canal an automobile road."

1953

- April: The city engineering department began a study to determine the feasibility of a dual-lane highway on each side of the Casey Canal.
- December: The report "The Case for the Casey Canal Parkway" was released. The estimated $500,000 proposed road would have one lane on each side of the improved canal with "rustic bridges or graceful arches" carrying cross streets. The proposed route was from Bee Road and Henry Street to Montgomery Crossroad.

1954 Thomas and Hutton Engineers recommended that the parkway run from Henry Street to DeRenne Avenue.

1955

- January: A new report recommended that the road extend from President Street to Montgomery Crossroads. A Morning News editorial suggested that the Casey Canal Parkway be named for Dr. William Richard Waring since the proposed road would be a convenient route to the new Memorial Hospital (now Memorial Health University Center.)
- April: The Metropolitan Planning Commission recommended that the city proceed with acquisition of land along the planned parkway path.
- May: The city asked the Savannah Real Estate Board for an appraisal of Boulevard Park, owned by G.B. McKenzie and located along Casey Canal just north of Victory Dr., so that the land could be bought for the planned roadway.
- September: The parkway plan had a projected cost of $3.25 million. The recommendation was that it be a divided highway with a two lane roads flanking the canal south of Victory Drive. The canal "would be cut in a V-shape, with a concrete base and grassy slope," with intersections only at President, Victory, DeRenne and Montgomery Crossroad.
- October: The Memorial board assured the city that it would grant right-of-way access to the road.

1958

- January 19: The Savannah Morning News ran a full-page article titled 'The Casey Canal: A throughway to Wassaw.' The route proposed begins at President St., following the old trolley lines to Isle of Hope, across Skidaway Island and ending on Wassaw Island. The last sentence of the article states: "Would it be out of line to suggest projecting the Casey Canal Parkway into the picture with the opening of a new decade - say, 1960?"
- February: A brief in the Morning News: "When do you think this project (Casey Canal Parkway) will materialize?" asked Alderman Jack Rauers at a city council meeting. "When we're in Bonaventure Cemetery," replied Alderman Malcolm Maclean.

1960

- December: Mayor Malcolm Maclean revealed plans to connect Bay with President Street by looping a new four-lane road around the Fort Jackson area.

1961

- September: The plan to re-route U. S. Highway 82 brought the possibility of federal funds for the Casey Canal Parkway.

1962

- January: A subcommittee of the Chamber of Commerce' Roads and Highways Committee announced it will be making a concerted effort to revive the Casey Canal Parkway plans.
- March: MPC Director A. A. "Don" Mendonsa (later city manager) recommended that the city adopt a policy regarding the rights of way of the Casey Canal. Mendonsa noted that several developers had presented plans for subdivisions on the planned route. The matter was referred to city attorney James Blackburn.
- April: Mayor Maclean announced that the rights-of-way were being acquired for the Bay to President Extension. He declared this the first leg of the proposed parkway.
- May: The city appointed a special committee to adopt an official map ordinance outlining the proposed parkway route. The city got the final rights-of-way for the Bay to President Extension. Herbert L. Kayton informed the city that part of the canal is named after him. The portion of the canal from the Savannah River to 39th Street was named for him in 1917. The city okayed a change in route for the parkway. The change was to extend the road due south from DeRenne rather than due east toward Isle of Hope.
- June: The MPC recommended against a proposed shopping center near the DeRenne-Casey area.
- December: The city asked the state highway department for a study of the proposed parkway. The study would facilitate the city's ability to allot subdivisions on the planned route.

1964

- July: A senatorial candidate proposed that the parkway construction could take care of flooding problems experienced by the area of Holly Heights and other lowlands.

1965

- January: A city roads priority listed the Casey Canal Parkway as the number one priority. The second is to four-lane DeRenne Avenue to LaRoche Avenue.
- April: MPC chairman Henry Levy requested a meeting on the parkway. He noted that several projects recommended in 1959 either have been constructed or are under way. The only two projects not yet begun are the parkway and the four-laning of DeRenne.

1968

- May: Discussions began again for the 'immediate' construction of the parkway, building it as a toll road to provide financing if necessary. Several endorsements were made, including Mayor J. Curtis Lewis stating that he favored a "nominal toll" if no other funds were available. Downtown merchants also favored the road. A Savannah Morning News editorial also supported the building of the road. Another group, Citizens Advisory Committee, also endorsed the parkway. Two aldermen, D. Boyd Yarley and William Gaudry, proposed that the county create a central, countywide recreation department so city funds could be spent on building the parkway. The route most needed, according to reports, was from Montgomery Crossroad to downtown. The city applied for federal funds despite cutbacks caused by the war in Vietnam.
- June: Alderman Yarley stated that he believed construction could start and be completed in early 1969. The project was sanctioned by the State Highway Department. Mayor Lewis asked city manager Picot Floyd to appoint a city engineer to work on the technical end of the parkway.
- July: Plans for the expansion of the city golf course from 18 to 27 holes are held up by the proposed parkway. The route would pass right through the area. The Research Group Inc., the city's Atlanta based advisors, stated that the parkway plan was feasible. The road could start out as a toll road, and then the outstanding bonds could be retired with federal grants.
- August: Some $5 to $7 million will be needed to be raised in order to build the parkway. A 10-cent toll became likely. The proposed route was announced. The road would begin with an interchange at Randolph and President streets, down President east then curve south around Hillcrest Abbey Cemetery. It would move south parallel to Bee Road to Anderson where it would pick up the canal bed. It would continue south to Bacon Park with two interchanges at Victory Dr. and DeRenne Ave. There would be an exit ramp at Memorial for emergency traffic but no entrance ramp. At Bacon Park, the road would swing east across the end of Lovett Dr. passing the golf course on the east and going through the third hole. It would then follow the route of an old streetcar tracks. After crossing Intermediate Road, it would curves back to the canal, skirting the Shrine Temple and Memorial Stadium, ending at Montgomery Crossroad. Since the city limits extended no further at that time, the county would finish the road around Halycon Bluff, across the Vernon River, to Holland Dr., ending at Abercorn Extension.
- September: The proposed toll rose from 15 to 20 cents.
- October: Mayor Lewis proposed the parkway be named for Georgia Gov. Lester Maddox.

1969

- January: Attempts were made to get funding from federal and state sources for purchasing rights-of-way.
- April: The State Highway Board authorized a study of the divided highway.
- June: State Highway Department head Jim Gillis suggested that the city build the parkway as a "faster and more economical method" of getting the road built.
- August: City Manager Floyd was directed to begin negotiations with Wilbur Smith and Associate on economic feasibility and Howard, Needles, Tammen and Bergendoff on design. The cost at this point was estimated to be $29.27 million.
- September: County officials were surprised to learn that the proposed route was going through the middle of Lake Mayer (officially dedicated in 1972). The alternative was the side of the lake, taking out the Southside Fire Dept. firehouse. Commission members called for meetings to work out a definite route.

1970

- March: City officials wanted parkway funding as part of a joint city-county road bond referendum. The county said no and the possible parkway funds were deleted from the issue. The bond issue failed.
- June: A feasibility study projected the cost of the parkway between $35 and $45 million and would not pay for itself through toll revenue.
- July: Released census figure showed the city and county population had dropped. A shadow was cast over the financing of the parkway. Later, officials met to discuss road priority projects and stated the parkway was needed and would be built some way.
- August: Yet another study brought the price of the parkway down to $25 million. The reduction came from a proposal to make it a 12.8-mile two-lane road from President to Abercorn Extension, eliminating two at-grade intersections, a structured road through the marsh on President, and a planned administration and maintenance center.
- November: Cost estimates spiraled back up to $45 million calling for further study.

1971

- October: The parkway was given a federal designation reviving efforts to get it constructed.

1972

- January: A Chatham Urban Transportation Study (CUTS) committee recommended that the highway be returned to priority status to allow preliminary engineering studies.
- April: The State Highway Dept. made a request to initiate preliminary engineering to determine the route of the parkway so that rights-of-way could be reserved.
- June: State Highway officials are asked to review an application for federal funds to build the road.
- July: The MPC endorsed Casey Canal (the name it was called then), but asked for minor re-routing. The problems included: bisecting Lake Mayer, intersecting Benedictine Military School, going through Frank W. Spencer Elementary School, and bisecting Hitch Village.

1973

- May: Chatham County Commission Chairman Tom Coleman announced that the county would receive nearly $13 million in federal revenue sharing funds. One of the top priorities would be to "speed up" the building of the Casey Canal Parkway. An allocation of $3.5 million was proposed.
- May/June: Name changed to Harry S Truman Parkway.
- July: Local official pitched the parkway to State DOT official Downing Musgrove at a monthly DOT meeting held in Savannah. Musgrove promised to investigate the request.
- August: Officials were told that there is little chance that the preliminary work could be completed by April 1974, the desired date. The cost at this point is projected to be $48 million. Later, Chairman Coleman asked the state to pick up the cost of the preliminary plans. The cost of that study was estimated to be between $175,000 and $225,000. The state would help if the road was built as a toll road.

1974

- April: The project was approved as an official project for study by the State Tollways Authority. The study would update the 1970 feasibility report. The route would extend from President St. to Whitfield Ave., less than five miles.
- October: County signed a contract to have the updated study done. It was scheduled to be completed November 15. Another update, dealing with traffic count and revenue projections was due March 23, 1975.
- December: A new cost update was released. Two plans were presented. One would be $76.5 million, the other $57.3 million. The more expensive plan allowed for four-laning the entire route, the lower price puts two lane roads at either end. The projected start of construction was 1977, with completion no sooner than 1980.

1976

- March: At a public meeting, three alternative routes of the $89 million parkway were presented. All three routes had a northern terminus at Abercorn Extension and Holland Dr. and a southern terminus at President St., in the vicinity of the Savannah Golf Club. Residents objected to the plans that would take the parkway through their neighborhood. Concerns were also expressed about the impact on the environment. They were also concerns that the planned tollroad will impact their neighborhoods and be of little use.
- May/July: Neighborhood opposition began to organize.
- September: Responding to neighborhood objections, four alternatives for the southern end were presented. The plans would cut cost and minimize damage to the marsh. There was also a proposal to reduce the 44 feet width to 14 feet with a safety barrier.
- October: Taxpayers Opposing the Parkway held its first meeting. They met with state officials to express their concerns about the proposed routes. A couple of weeks later, the environmental impact assessment was released. The cost was estimated to be between $66 and $76 million, displacing about 90 residences, 15 businesses, and some recreational facilities.
- November: In an 8 - 1 vote, the MPC endorsed the Truman Parkway. The Chatham delegation was split. A hearing was held by the Georgia DOT to hear the pros and cons of the road. Claims were made that elected (and in favor) officials were allowed to speak as long as they wish. Opponents were limited to five minutes.

1977

- January: The Georgia Board of Transportation gave unanimous approval to the $76.8 million roadway. The 11.5-mile tollroad would join President to Abercorn. The tentative construction dates: mid-1978 to be completed in mid-1980. A revenue bond with a 40-year payback period would finance the work along with a toll. The charge would be from 10 to 30 cents per car depending on the length of the trip. There could still be a hold-up if the route is not approved.
- February: State Rep. Tom Taggart called on Gov. George Busbee, in his capacity as head of the Georgia Tollway Authority, to block the parkway. He claimed it would benefit low-density areas, like Skidaway Island and not help areas such as Wilmington Island.
- March: $500,000 was approved to fund a detailed engineering study. White Bluff United Methodist Church was successful in getting the route moved away from the church's yard. The road was going to pass within 100 feet of the church. The study would fine-tune some of the earlier work done on the route. Residents of Belleview Estates learned that the road would alter their subdivision near Whitefield and Bellman Ave. And two county commissioners floated the idea that a westside route should be considered.
- May: The Savannah Chamber of Commerce started a petition and letter-writing campaign to show the parkway is supported. Opponents indicated that there are other ways to ease congestion by widening existing north–south streets, timing traffic lights at peak hours, and building an expressway on the westside.

The Savannah Morning News ran a five-part series looking at the 25-year history of the parkway and all its facets to date.

Opponents called for a referendum on the parkway. Those same opponents called the Savannah News-Press series "one-sided" and "dreadfully lacking" the views of the opposition. County Commission Chairman Shelby Myrick said that Georgia law does not allow for such a referendum.

- June: Taxpayers Opposed to the Parkway (TOP) attacked the projected cost of the road. They claimed the consultants - Wilbur Smith and Associates and Howard, Needles, Tammen and Bergendoff - have provided studies for toll roads in Florida that were failing financially. The parkway could also hike the cost of proposed renovation and expansion at the Bacon Park Municipal Golf Course.
- July: St. Rep. Taggert tried to kill the parkway again. He claimed that the projected cost of $72.8 million will end up being more like $125 million. He also reiterated that if the parkway runs under projected traffic volume, taxpayers will pay more. The final proposed route was released at the end of the month.
- August: Georgia DOT commissioner Tom Moreland reaffirmed his support of the parkway saying that once the plan receives a permit from the U.S. Corps of Engineers and the U.S. Coast Guard, the toll road would be built. Tom Coleman also revealed that TOP's information about the beleaguered toll road in Florida was not studied by the same consultant group as Truman's group.
- December: Surveying by the DOT for the parkway began and was to be finished in March.

1978

- May: The DOT applied for permits from the U.S. Corps of Engineers for areas of the road that affect marshlands and waterways.
- July: The final route was released.
- August: Comments were invited with a hearing to be held in November. That hearing was postponed to 1979.

1979

- March: The Chatham County Hospital Authority expressed concern over the proposed relocating of the Casey Canal to accommodate the road. They were concerned that any future expansion of Memorial Hospital would be jeopardized by the move. (Memorial was still a county 'owned' business at that time.)
- April: The draft environmental impact statement was completed. Proponents and opponents showed up to voice their opinions on the report. Again, proponents received time at the beginning and opponents have to wait until the wee hours to state their objections.
- May: Concerns were expressed over how the proposed parkway route would affect public schools in its path. The Board of Education received a report on how the road would affect Low, Hesse, Spencer, and Herty elementary schools and Wilder, Shuman Middle and Jenkins High schools. Wilder would take the biggest hit with eight acres taken away. (Wilder was later sold to Memorial for expansion.)
- July: The Corps of Engineers determined that potential flooding was a factor as to whether the road should be built. The final environmental report was due soon.
- August: Historic Savannah Foundation suggested that Gordonston, a 1920s suburb, would suffer as the result of the proposed parkway. The U.S. Department of Housing and Urban Development sent a letter to the Corps stating that unless there are plans to replace playgrounds at Hitch Village and Garden Homes that were to be demolished as a result of the roadway, they would deny the permit for the road.
- December: There was yet another holdup on the permit when the DOT failed to provide needed traffic analyses to the Corps of Engineers.

=== Recent expansion ===
The fifth and final phase of the Truman Parkway extension project opened to traffic on March 14, 2014 at 9:40 a.m.

An official ribbon-cutting ceremony was held on February 28, 2014, at 3:30 p.m.

== Exit list ==
The entire route is in Chatham County. All exits are unnumbered.

Location	mi	km	Destinations	Notes
Savannah	0.0	0.0	SR 204 (Abercorn Street)	Southern terminus; SR 204 westbound has no access to the parkway entrance
Savannah	0.7	1.1	White Bluff Road	No access from Truman Parkway north to White Bluff Road or from White Bluff Road to Truman Parkway south; access is from local roads at southern terminus.
	2.0	3.2	Whitefield Avenue	Former SR 204 Spur
Savannah	3.6	5.8	Montgomery Cross Road	Access to Lake Mayer
Savannah	4.3	6.9	Eisenhower Drive / Beaumont Drive	
Savannah	6.1	9.8	DeRenne Avenue to I-16 / I-516 – Hunter AAF	
Savannah	7.2	11.6	DeLesseps Avenue	
Savannah	8.0	12.9	US 80 (Victory Drive / SR 26) – Tybee Island	
Savannah	8.9	14.3	Anderson Street / Henry Street / Wheaton Street	
Savannah	10.8	17.4	President Street – Downtown	Northern terminus
1.000 mi = 1.609 km; 1.000 km = 0.621 mi: Incomplete access

== See also ==
- Harry S. Truman
- USS Harry S. Truman
