= Kathy Pham =

Vietnamese American computer scientist

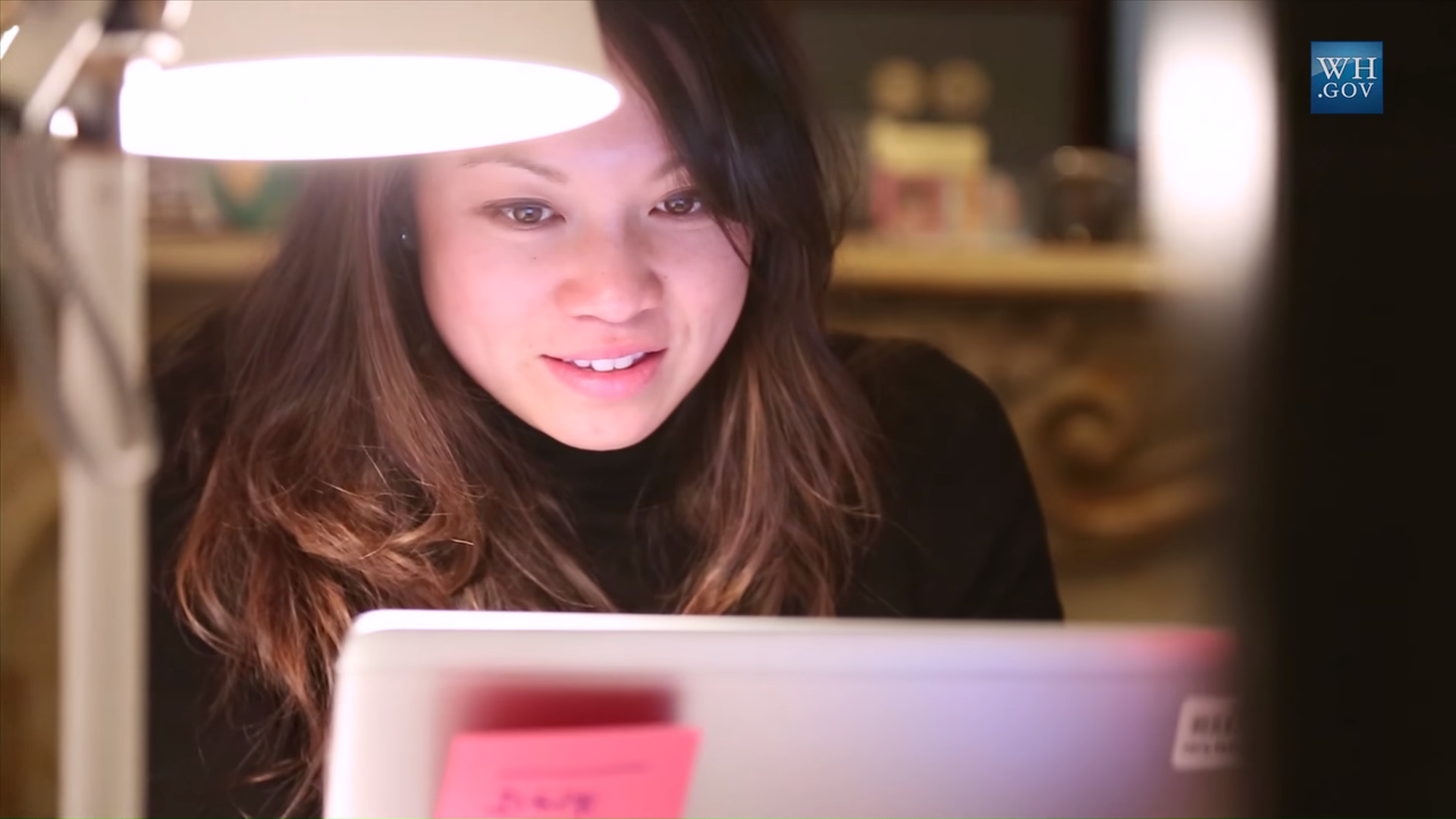
- Pham at the United States Digital Service in 2015
- Education: Georgia Institute of Technology Supélec
- Board member of: Anita Borg Institute for Women and Technology, Make the Breast Pump Not Suck, Civic Signals, Georgia Institute of Technology, Startups & Society Initiative, FWD50, Salesforce

Kathy Pham is a Vietnamese American computer scientist and product management executive. She has held roles in leadership, engineering, product management, and data science at Google, IBM, the Georgia Tech Research Institute, Harris Healthcare, and served as a founding product and engineering member of the United States Digital Service (USDS) in the Executive Office of the President of the United States at The White House. Pham was the Deputy Chief Technology Officer for Product and Engineering at the Federal Trade Commission, and the inaugural Executive Director of the National AI Advisory Committee.

Pham is a Fellow and Faculty member at the Harvard Kennedy School where she created and teaches Product Management and Society. She has held positions as Fellow at Mozilla, Fellow at the Rita Allen Foundation, and Fellow at the Harvard Berkman Klein Center where she co-founded the Ethical Tech Group and was part of the Ethics and Governance of Artificial Intelligence Fellows in partnership with the MIT Media Lab. At Mozilla, Pham co-leads the Responsible Computer Science Challenge and co-founded the Mozilla Fix the Internet Incubator. Pham founded Product and Society, which focuses on product management, ethics, and the public interest. Pham has been part of a championship StarCraft II team, and placed 1st the Imagine Cup competition, representing the United States with a sentiment analysis (EmotionAI) engine.

== Early life and education ==
Pham’s parents were Vietnamese boat people, who spent several years in refugee camps before immigrating to the United States. Her brother, United States Marine Corps Major David Pham, was presented the Purple Heart medal during combat operations in Afghanistan.

Pham attended Windsor Forest High School in Savannah, Georgia, where she was a member of the volleyball team and graduated as salutatorian of her graduating class.

Pham earned a Bachelor of Science in Computer Science from the Georgia Institute of Technology. She also holds a Master of Science in computer science from both the Georgia Institute of Technology and Supélec, specializing in cryptography and human computer interaction. While in university, Pham was the chair of Georgia Tech's Women in Computing, director of technology at Phi Mu fraternity, researcher in the Bio-Medical Informatics and Bio-Imaging Lab, and founded the southeast chapter of United for Sight.

== Career ==
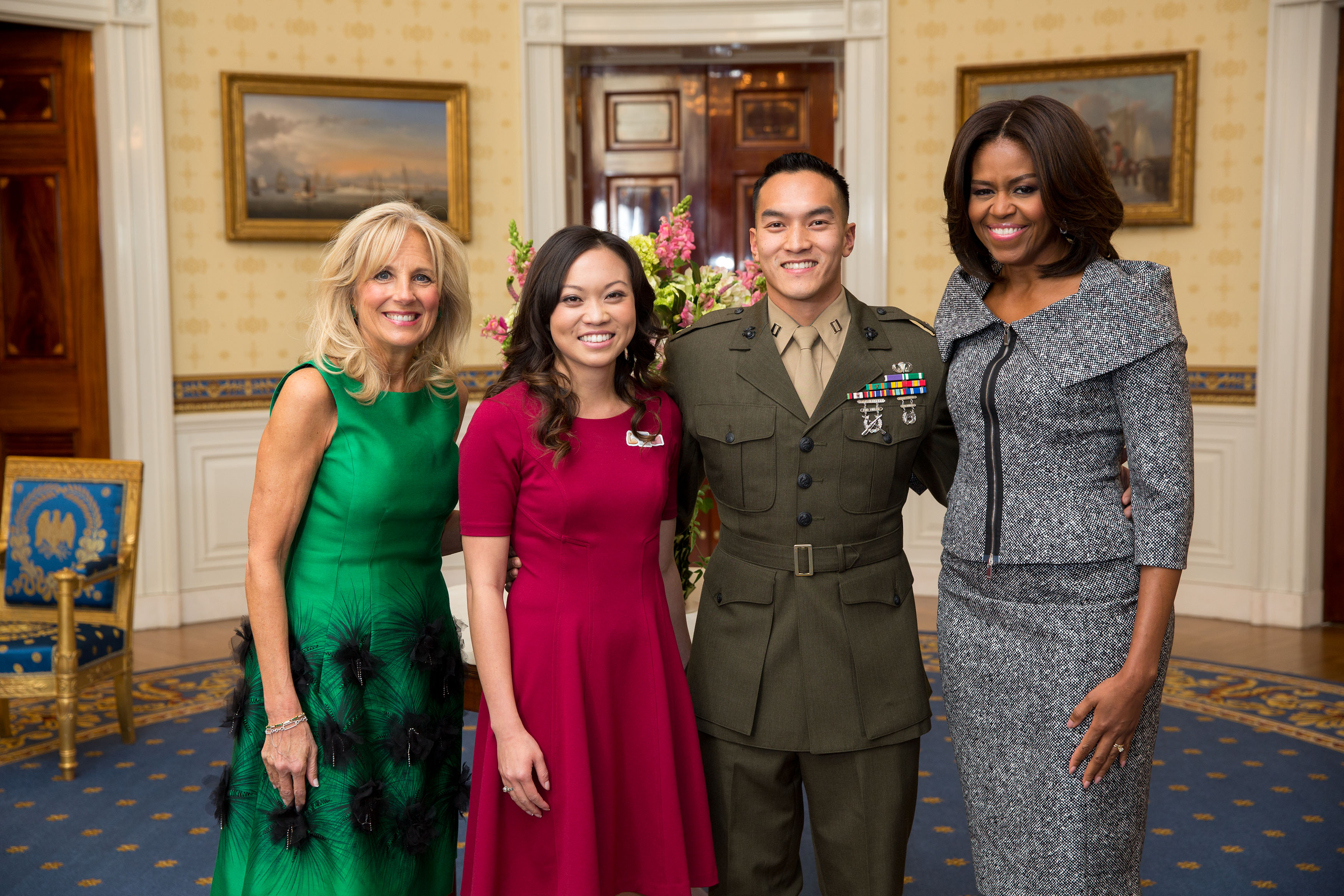
Michelle Obama and Jill Biden greet Kathy Pham, First Lady's State of the Union box guest, and brother Captain David Pham in the Blue Room of the White House in 2015

Pham began her career as a software engineer building flights simulation and healthcare interoperability software at the Georgia Tech Research Institute and Harris Healthcare. She then was a consultant and data scientist at IBM who focused on healthcare analytics. There, she also led IBM’s Employee Charitable Contribution Campaign and founded the After Hours Gaming League for StarCraft II with a team that made it to the league gaming finals. At Google, she held roles in product management, technical program management, and data science on Google Health, Google People Operations, and Google Search. She founded Google’s first Business Intelligence Summit, called SELECT*. Pham left Google in 2014 to join and build the United States Digital Service, where she led and contributed to public services across the Veterans Affairs, Department of Defense, Precision Medicine Initiative, and Cancer Moonshot, spanning engineering, product management, and people operations. Pham was a guest speaker to the White House State of Science, Technology, Engineering, and Math (SoSTEM), following the State of the Union address in 2015.

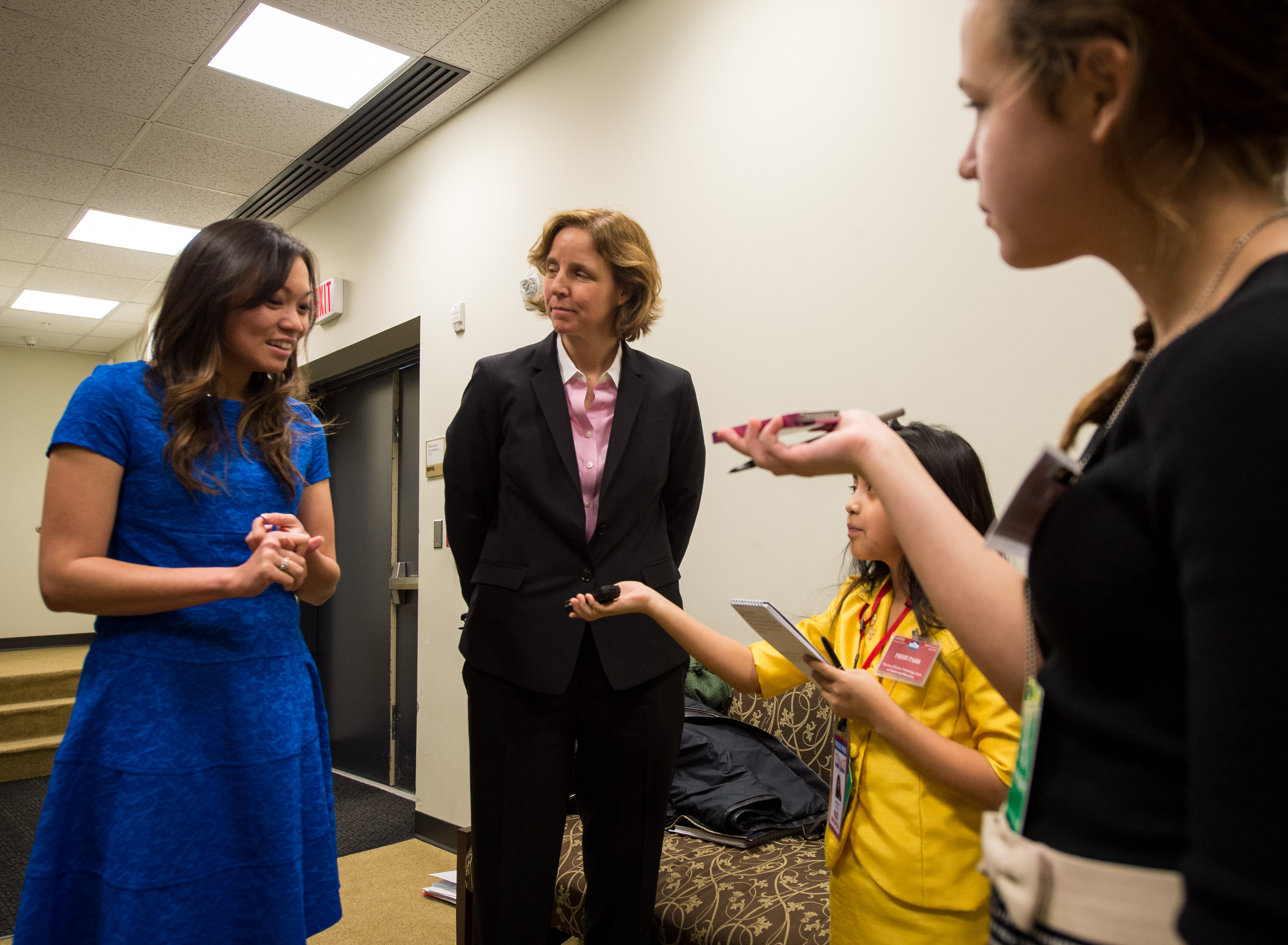
Kathy Pham and Megan Smith interviewed at State of STEM at the White House

Since 2017, Pham has been selected as a Fellow, and now Affiliate, at Harvard University’s Berkman Klein Center for Internet and Society, where her research spans technology, policy, healthcare, artificial intelligence, and the social responsibility and ethics of the tech industry. As a member of the 2018 MIT Media Lab and Berkman Klein Center Assembly, Pham's work addressed the ethics and governance of Artificial Intelligence with a focus on community involvement and community voices, and she co-founded ai-in-the-loop. Pham teaches Product Management and Society at the Harvard Kennedy School, where she has also feld Fellowships at the Shorenstein Center and Belfer Center.

From 2018 to 2021, at Mozilla, Pham was a Fellow and Co-Director of the Responsible Computer Science Challenge, where she also co-edited the Teaching Responsible Computing Playbook along with Atri Rudra. In 2020, Pham co-founded the Fix the Internet Incubator at Mozilla, supporting 50 teams and start-ups world-wide in the first year. She later served as a Senior Advisor at Mozilla.

In 2021, Pham was named Deputy Chief Technology Officer of the Federal Trade Commission.

In 2023, Pham was named the inaugural Executive Director of the National AI Advisory Committee (NAIAC), which advises the President and National AI Initiative Office.

Pham is active with outreach and activism, and has been notable for bringing her infant daughter along for a keynote address prompting the hashtag #LittleKeynoteSpeaker. She works closely with immigrant communities to help navigate government services. Pham has served as an advisory board member of the Anita Borg Institute and the Make the Breast Pump Not Suck Initiative. To honor her late mother, Pham created the Mary Hương Thị Phạm Endowment at the Georgia Institute of Technology. Pham was the founder and executive director of the Cancer Sidekick Foundation and the founder of the Boston Chapter of Women in Product. She coined the term Cancer Patient Sidekick.

== Honors ==
- Inducted into the Computing Hall of Fame at the Georgia Institute of Technology (2021)
- Inaugural 40 under 40, Georgia Institute of Technology (2020)
- Invited to give Commencement Class Day Farewell Lecturer, Harvard Kennedy School (2020)
- Invited to give Commencement Speaker, Harvard University, Extension School (2019)
- One of the youngest members to be inducted in the Georgia Tech Greek Hall of Fame. (2017)
- First Lady Michelle Obama’s Guest to the 2015 State of the Union
- Nguoi Viet’s 40 under 40
- First Place, representing the United States in the international Imagine Cup “Olympics for Technology” competition with over 300,000 competitors.
- Georgia Tech College of Computing’s Most Outstanding Junior
- Finalist for the Anita Borg Memorial Scholarship
- Salutatorian of Windsor Forest High School graduating class
