= Georgia State Route 204 =

State highway in Georgia, United States

State Route 204
- Georgia State Route 204 highlighted in red

Route information
- Maintained by GDOT
- Length: 32.4 mi (52.1 km)

Major junctions
- West end: US 280 / SR 30 east of Pembroke
- I-95 southwest of Savannah; US 17 / SR 25 southwest of Savannah
- East end: SR 21 in Savannah

Location
- Country: United States
- State: Georgia
- Counties: Bryan, Chatham

Highway system
- Georgia State Highway System; Interstate; US; State; Special
← SR 203	→ SR 205
← SR 358	SR 359	→ SR 360

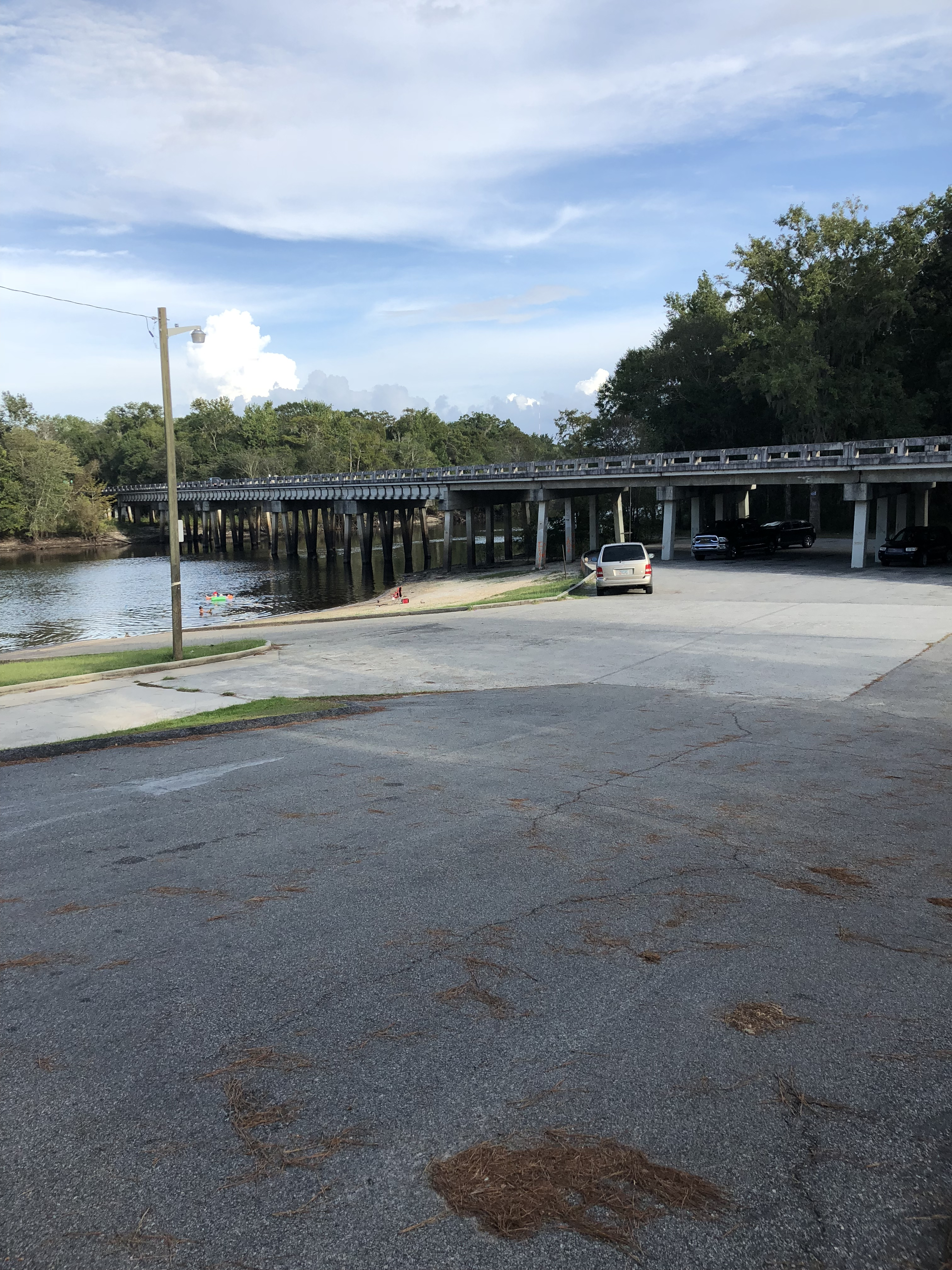
GA SR 204 crossing the Ogeechee River as seen from the Bryan County side

State Route 204 (SR 204) is a 32.4-mile-long (52.1 km) state highway in the east-central part of the U.S. state of Georgia. It runs from a point east of Pembroke and ends in Savannah. Its routing is located within portions of Bryan and Chatham counties.

== Route description ==
SR 204 begins at an intersection with US 280/SR 30 in Lanier. It heads east through Ellabell, Georgia. It curves to the southeast and parallels the northeastern part of Fort Stewart. It has an interchange with Interstate 95 (I-95), followed by an interchange with US 17/SR 25 (Ocean Highway), an interchange with King George Boulevard, an interchange with the Veterans Parkway (also known as the Southwest Bypass) and an interchange with Harry S. Truman Parkway in the southwest of Savannah. It curves to the northeast and meets the former SR 204 Spur (Montgomery Cross Road). It then continues northeast to meet its eastern terminus at an intersection with the southern terminus of SR 21 (DeRenne Avenue).

The highway is two lanes as it travels east through rural Bryan County and the Ellabell community. Once it crosses the Ogeechee River and enters Chatham County, the highway becomes known as Fort Argyle Road. Development is more noticeable as one travels east, and there is a large collection of businesses catering to travelers at the interchange with I-95. It is at this interchange that the highway changes from two lanes to four divided lanes. Traffic is often quite heavy as SR 204 is the major route from I-95 into the busy south side of Savannah. Though SR 204 is known as Abercorn Expressway as it enters Savannah, it is not a freeway until after it passes through a signal at Grove Point Road. While there is a grade separated interchange at US 17/SR 25, there is a at-grade signalized intersection at Grove Point Road, which can cause traffic delays, as it continues closer to Savannah, it becomes a true freeway with an interchange at King George Boulevard (which used to be a signal), where the highway becomes six lanes divided, and another interchange with Veterans Parkway. The speed limit is 45 miles per hour (72 km/h).The route enters Savannah city limits as it crosses the Little Ogeechee River. At the signaled intersection with Rio Road, adjacent to the Savannah Mall, the highway loses its controlled access. As the route continues through the south side of Savannah it has an interchange where the Harry S. Truman Parkway begins. It remains six lanes until an intersection with DeRenne Avenue, where it meets its eastern terminus. The roadway continues as four lanes past its terminus.

=== National Highway System ===
The west–east portion of SR 204 east of I-95 is the only part of the road that is included within the National Highway System, a system of roadways important to the nation's economy, defense, and mobility.

== History ==
The portion of the route running along Abercorn Street was previously numbered as State Route 359.

In 2020, SR 204 was truncated 2.9-mile (4.7 km) south to a shared end point with SR 21 (DeRenne Avenue). The previous alignment extended north along Abercorn Street through Midtown Savannah to 37th Street. SR 204 lined 37th Street west to the 37th Street Connector with I-16.

== Major intersections ==
County	Location	mi	km	Destinations	Notes
Bryan	Lanier	0.0	0.0	US 280 / SR 30 – Pembroke, Blitchton	Western terminus
Chatham		19.4	31.2	I-95 – Brunswick	I-95 exit 94; connects to I-16
Chatham		21.2	34.1	US 17 (Ogeechee Road / Ocean Highway / SR 25) – Richmond Hill, Savannah	Interchange
Chatham	Georgetown	24.2	38.9	King George Boulevard	Interchange
Chatham		25.2	40.6	Downtown Savannah (Veterans Parkway north) to I-516	Interchange; southern terminus of Veterans Parkway
Chatham	Savannah	28.4	45.7	Harry S. Truman Parkway north	Interchange; southern terminus of Harry S. Truman Parkway; SR 204 westbound has no access to the parkway entrance
Chatham	Savannah	30.0	48.3	West Montgomery Cross Road – Skidaway Island	Former western terminus of SR 204 Spur
Chatham	Savannah	32.4	52.1	SR 21 north (East DeRenne Avenue) to I-16 / I-516	Eastern terminus; southern terminus of SR 21
1.000 mi = 1.609 km; 1.000 km = 0.621 mi: Incomplete access

== Savannah spur route ==
State Route 204 Spur
- Location: Savannah
- Length: 7.2 mi (11.6 km)
- Existed: 1989–2020

State Route 204 Spur (SR 204 Spur) was a spur route of SR 204 that connected the mainline to Skidaway Island. Segments of SR 204 Spur are named Montgomery Cross Road, Waters Avenue, Whitfield Avenue, Diamond Causeway, and Tidewater Way. SR 204 Spur was turned over to local control as part of the deal with the Georgia Department of Transportation that extended SR 17 onto the Jimmy DeLoach Parkway and truncated the eastern terminus of SR 204 to SR 21.

SR 204 Spur was not part of the National Highway System, a system of roadways important to the nation's economy, defense, and mobility.

The entire route was in Chatham County.

Location	mi	km	Destinations	Notes
Savannah	0.0	0.0	SR 204 (Abercorn Street) – Richmond Hill	Western terminus
Savannah	2.8	4.5	Harry S. Truman Parkway – St. Joseph's Hospital, Medical College of Georgia	Interchange
Skidaway Island	7.2	11.6	Tidewater Way / Green Island Road / McWhorter Drive	Eastern terminus
1.000 mi = 1.609 km; 1.000 km = 0.621 mi
