= New Hampstead High School =

Public secondary school in Bloomingdale, Georgia, United States

Location
- 2451 Little Neck Road; Bloomingdale, Georgia 31302; United States; 32°04′30″N 81°19′13″W

Information
- Type: Public high school
- Established: 2012 (14 years ago)
- School district: Savannah-Chatham County Public Schools
- CEEB code: 110399
- Principal: Tawn Foltz
- Teaching staff: 75.80 (on an FTE basis)
- Grades: 9–12
- Enrollment: 1,123 (2024-2025)
- Student to teacher ratio: 14.82
- Colors: Black, maroon, gold
- Nickname: Phoenix
- Accreditation: Southern Association of Colleges and Schools
- Website: nhhs.sccpss.com

New Hampstead High School is a public secondary school in Bloomingdale, Georgia, United States. It serves grades 9-12 for the Savannah-Chatham County Public Schools.

== Notable alumni ==
- Samuel Brown, college football wide receiver for the Miami Hurricanes
