= Whitemarsh Island, Georgia =

- Unincorporated community Census-designated place
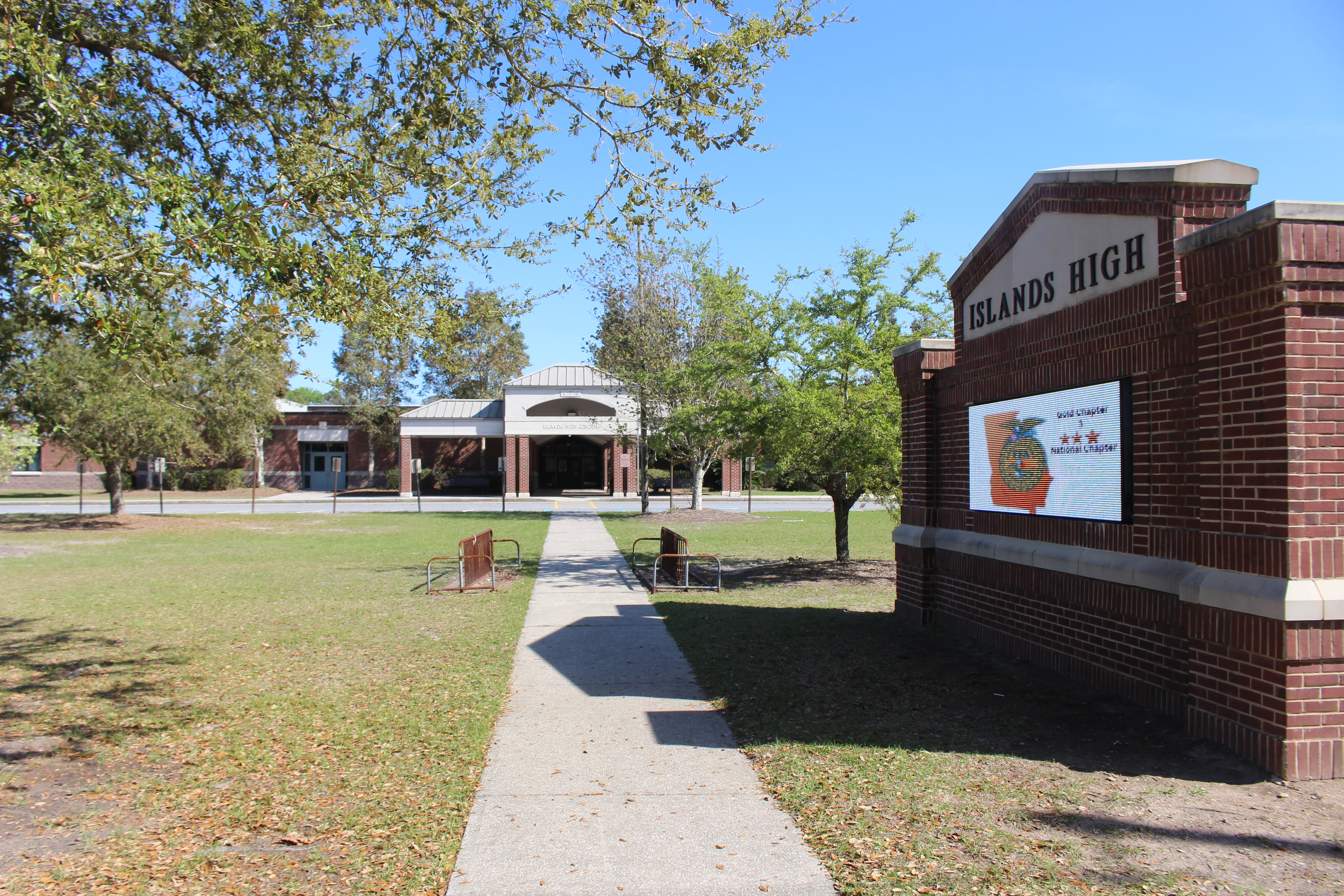
- Islands High School

- Location in Chatham County and the state of Georgia
- Coordinates: 32°2′22″N 81°0′28″W
- Country: United States
- State: Georgia
- County: Chatham

Area
  - Total: 6.64 sq mi (17.21 km^{2})
  - Land: 5.81 sq mi (15.06 km^{2})
  - Water: 0.83 sq mi (2.15 km^{2})
- Elevation: 3 ft (0.91 m)

Population (2020)
  - Total: 6,983
  - Density: 1,200.8/sq mi (463.64/km^{2})
- Time zone: UTC-5 (Eastern (EST))
  - Summer (DST): UTC-4 (EDT)
- FIPS code: 13-82636
- GNIS feature ID: 1867247

Whitemarsh Island (/ˈhwɪtmɑːrʃ/; WHIT-marsh) is an unincorporated community and census-designated place (CDP) in Chatham County, Georgia, United States. The population was 6,983 at the 2020 U.S. census. It is part of the Savannah metropolitan statistical area. The communities of Whitemarsh Island are a relatively affluent suburb of Savannah.

== Geography ==
The Whitemarsh Island CDP is located at 32°2′22″N 81°0′28″W (32.039482, -81.007850), occupying the island of the same name. It is bordered to the north by Richardson Creek, to the east by Turner Creek, and to the south and west by the Wilmington River, all of which are tidal water bodies. U.S. Route 80 crosses the island, leading west into Savannah and east to Tybee Island on the Atlantic shore. The Islands Expressway runs northwest from Whitemarsh Island 6.5 miles (10.5 km) to downtown Savannah.

According to the United States Census Bureau, the Whitemarsh Island CDP has a total area of 6.6 square miles (17.2 km^{2}), of which 5.6 square miles (14.6 km^{2}) is land and 1.0 square mile (2.6 km^{2}), or 15.10%, is water.

== Demographics ==
Historical population
Census	Pop.	Note	%±
1990	2,554		—
2000	5,824		128.0%
2010	6,792		16.6%
2020	6,983		2.8%
U.S. Decennial Census; 1850-1870 1870-1880; 1890-1910 1920-1930; 1940 1950 1960; 1970 1980 1990; 2000 2010 2020

Whitemarsh Island was first listed as a census designated place in the 1990 U.S. census.

=== Racial and ethnic composition ===
Whitemarsh Island, Georgia – Racial and ethnic composition Note: the US Census treats Hispanic/Latino as an ethnic category. This table excludes Latinos from the racial categories and assigns them to a separate category. Hispanics/Latinos may be of any race.
Race / Ethnicity (NH = Non-Hispanic)	Pop 2000	Pop 2010	Pop 2020	% 2000	% 2010	% 2020
White alone (NH)	4,717	5,469	5,497	80.99%	80.52%	78.72%
Black or African American alone (NH)	530	567	379	9.10%	8.35%	5.43%
Native American or Alaska Native alone (NH)	13	9	12	0.22%	0.13%	0.17%
Asian alone (NH)	334	417	455	5.73%	6.14%	6.52%
Pacific Islander alone (NH)	7	3	2	0.12%	0.04%	0.03%
Some Other Race alone (NH)	13	9	39	0.22%	0.13%	0.56%
Mixed race or Multiracial (NH)	70	113	339	1.20%	1.66%	4.85%
Hispanic or Latino (any race)	140	205	260	2.40%	3.02%	3.72%
Total	5,824	6,792	6,983	100.00%	100.00%	100.00%

=== 2020 census ===
As of the 2020 census, Whitemarsh Island had a population of 6,983. The median age was 42.6 years. 18.6% of residents were under the age of 18 and 18.8% of residents were 65 years of age or older. For every 100 females there were 90.3 males, and for every 100 females age 18 and over there were 86.7 males age 18 and over.

90.7% of residents lived in urban areas, while 9.3% lived in rural areas.

There were 3,022 households and 1,704 families in Whitemarsh Island, of which 25.5% had children under the age of 18 living in them. Of all households, 49.4% were married-couple households, 14.9% were households with a male householder and no spouse or partner present, and 29.3% were households with a female householder and no spouse or partner present. About 29.1% of all households were made up of individuals and 10.8% had someone living alone who was 65 years of age or older.

There were 3,314 housing units, of which 8.8% were vacant. The homeowner vacancy rate was 1.6% and the rental vacancy rate was 7.8%.

== Education ==
It is in Savannah-Chatham County Public Schools. Schools include:

- Islands High School
- Coastal Middle School
- Marshpoint Elementary School

Live Oak Public Libraries operates the Islands Library.

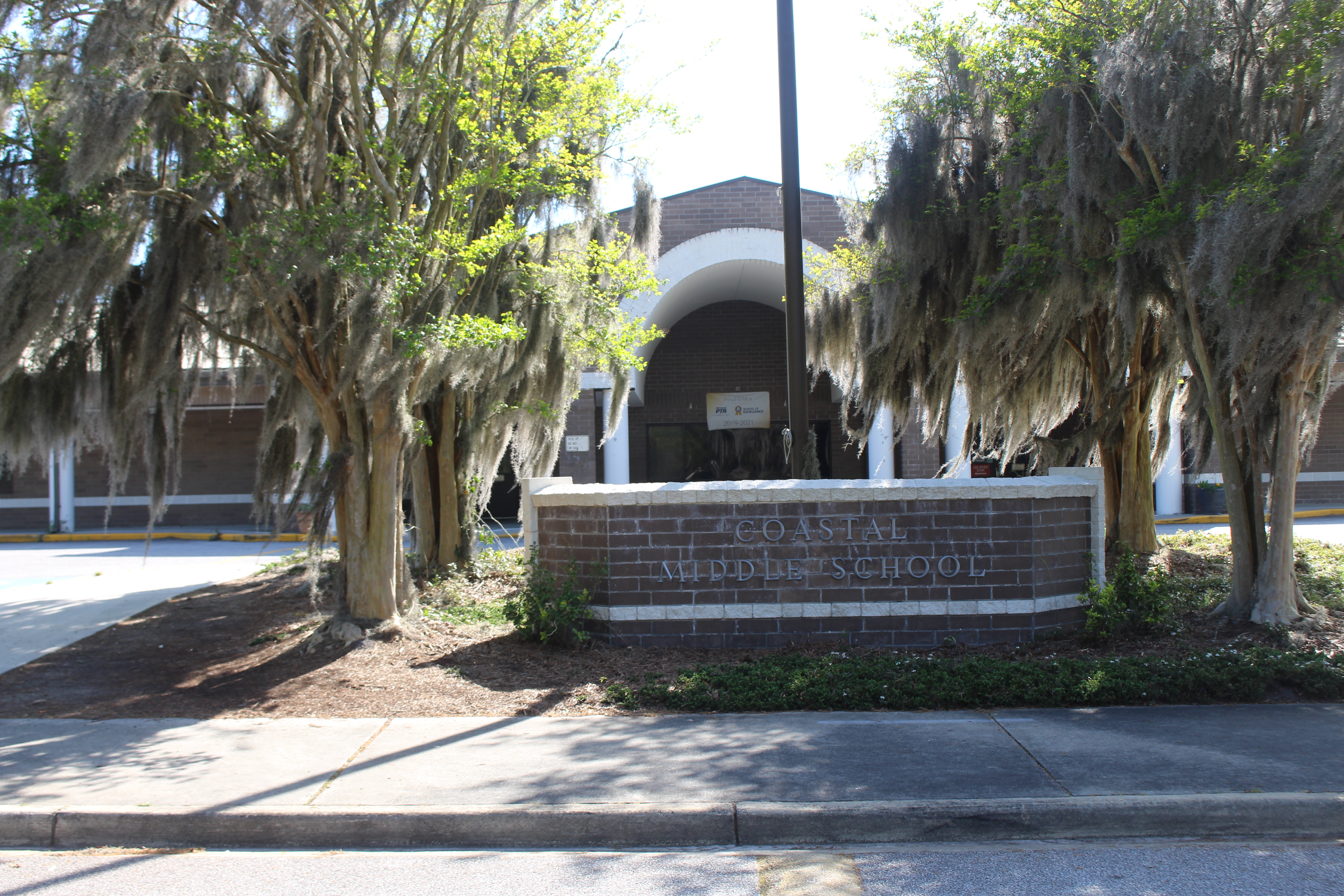
Coastal Middle School

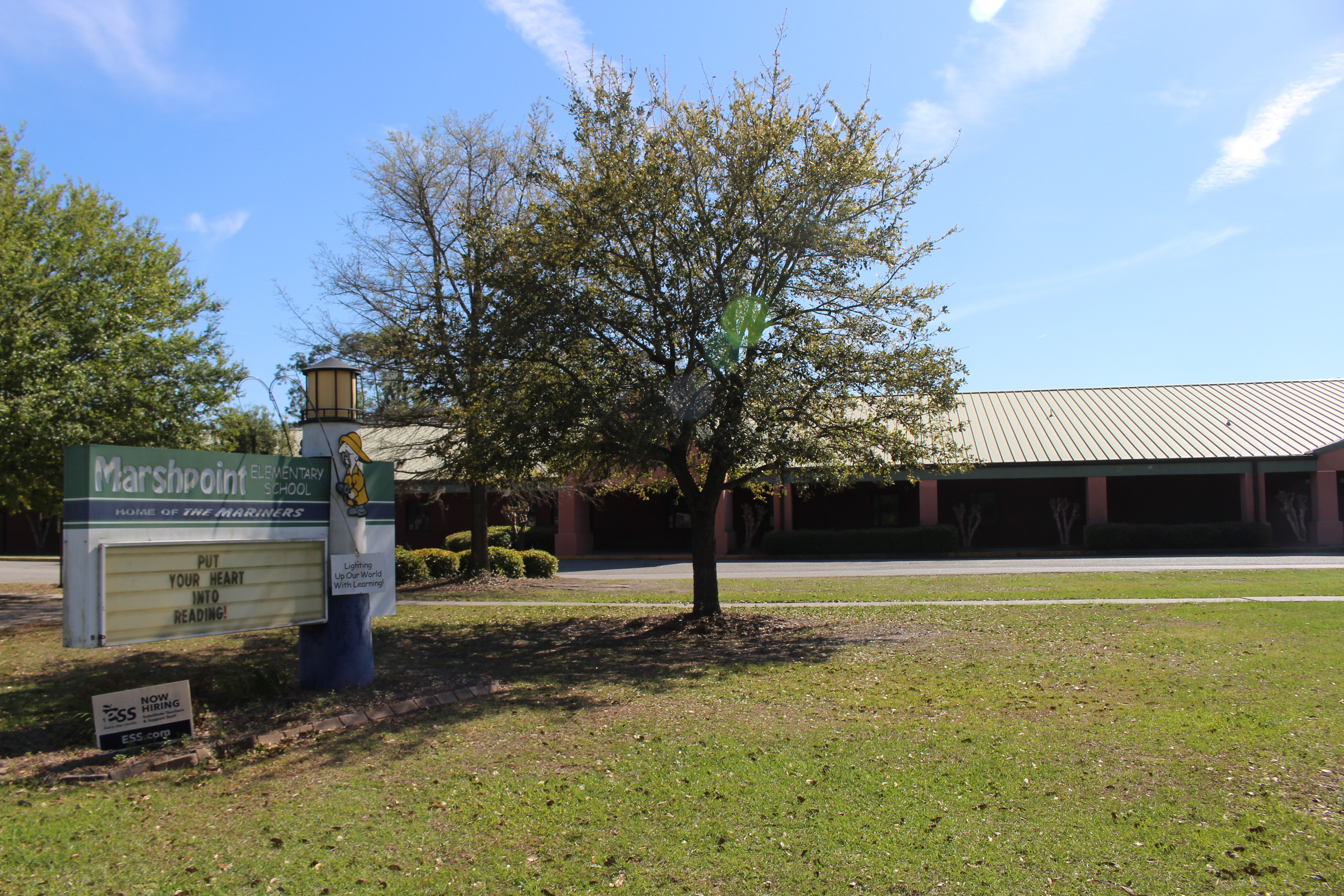
Marshpoint Elementary School

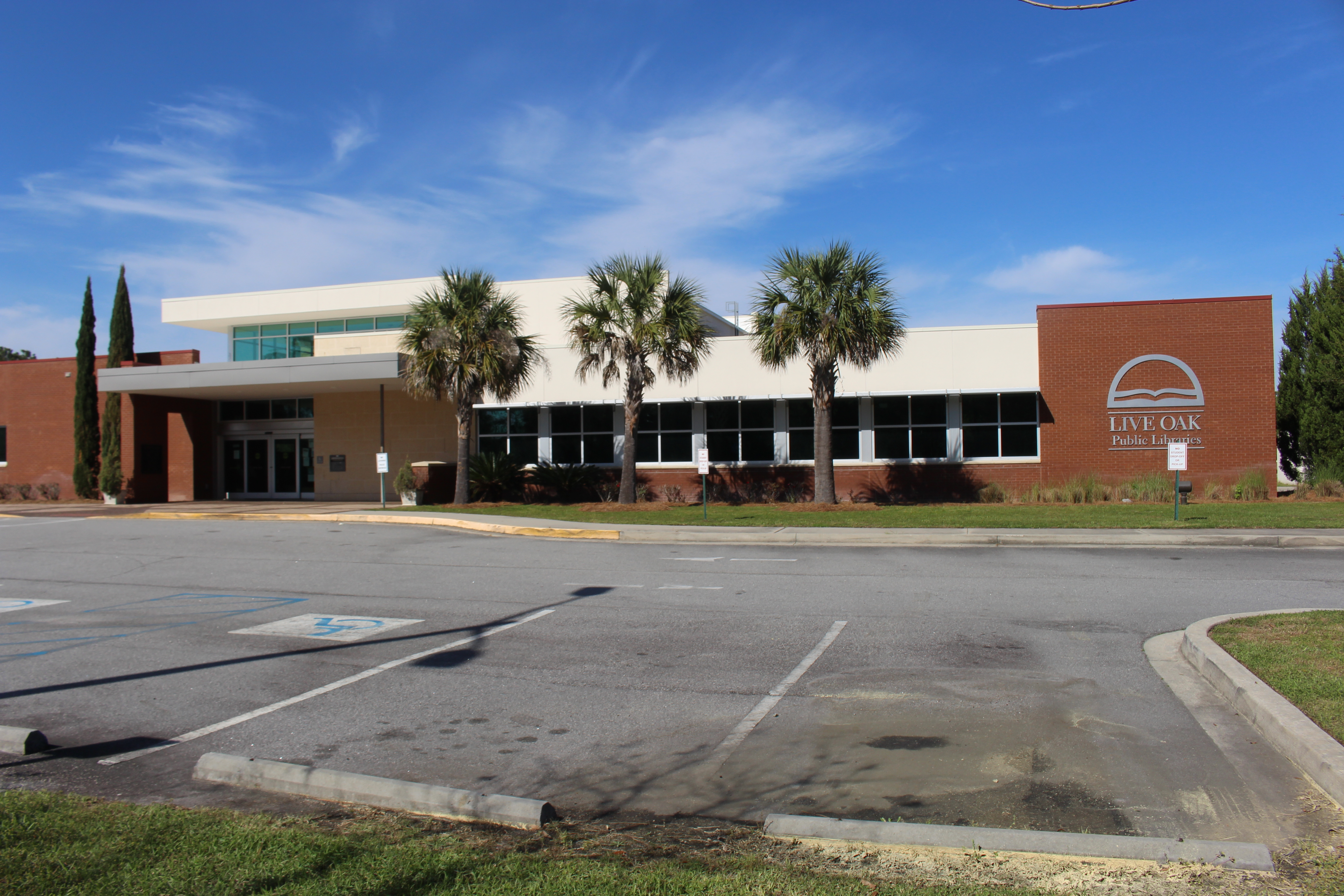
Live Oak Public Libraries, Whitemarsh Island
