= Islands High School =

Public high school on Whitemarsh Island in Chatham County, Georgia, United States

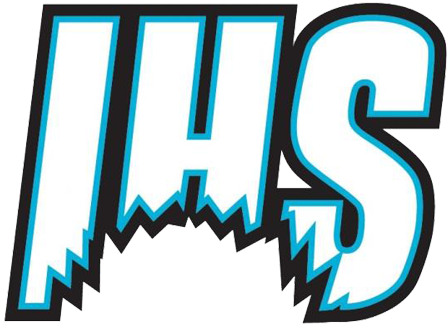

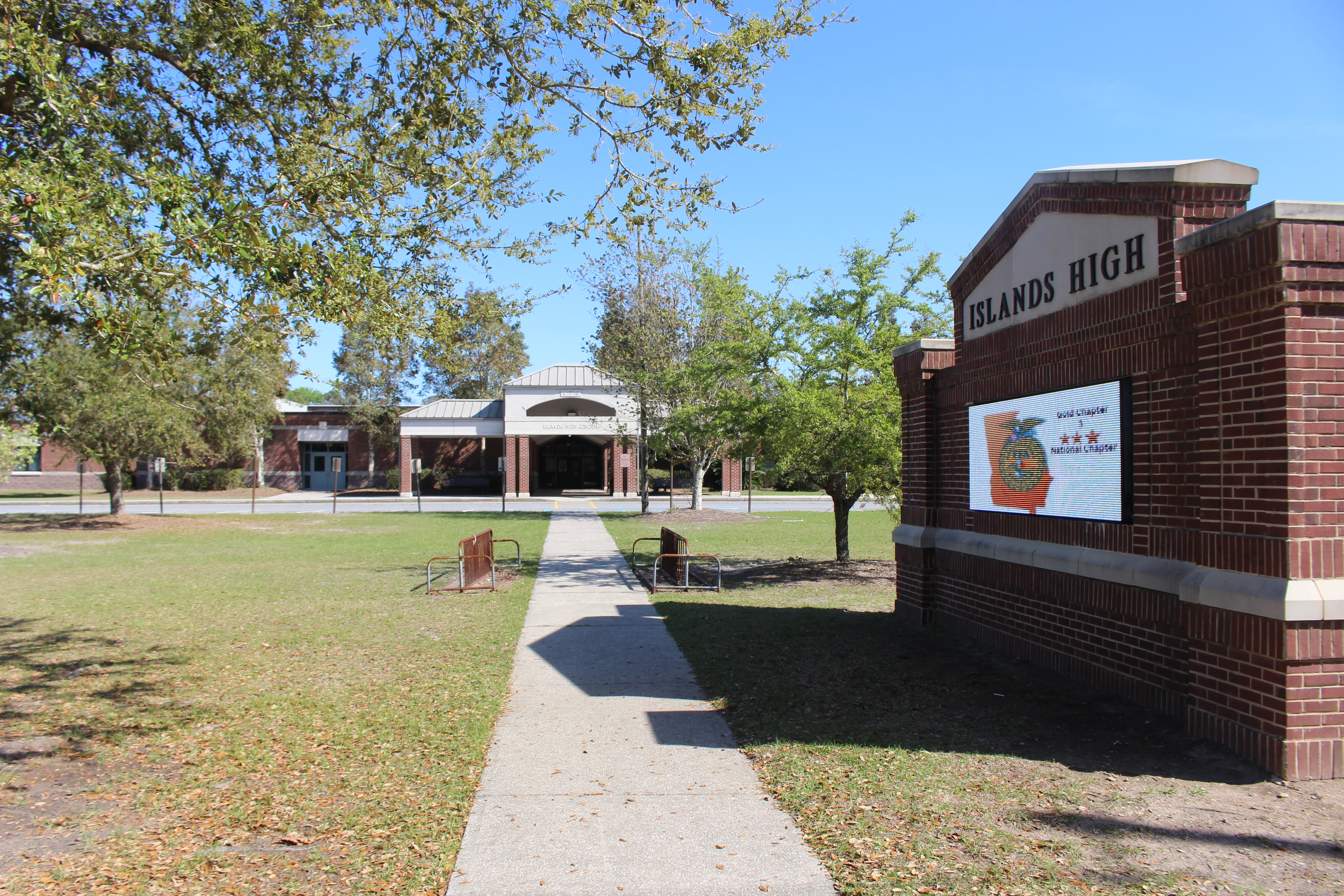

Location
- 170 Whitemarsh Island Road; Savannah, Chatham County, Georgia 31410; United States; 32°02′14″N 81°00′27″W

Information
- Type: Public
- Opened: 2010 (16 years ago)
- School board: Savannah-Chatham County School Board
- School district: Savannah-Chatham County Public Schools
- Principal: Jimmie Cave
- Staff: 53.90 (FTE)
- Grades: 9-12
- Enrollment: 814 (2023-2024)
- Student to teacher ratio: 15.10
- Colors: Teal, black, and white
- Nickname: Sharks
- Yearbook: The Tributary
- Website: islands.sccpss.com

Islands High School is a public high school located on Whitemarsh Island in unincorporated Chatham County, Georgia, United States, east of Savannah (with a Savannah postal address). The school is part of the Savannah-Chatham County Public Schools, and its basic attendance zone covers the urbanized Georgia barrier islands of Whitemarsh, Wilmington, Talahi, and Tybee. The school is accredited by the Southern Association of Colleges and Schools and the Georgia Accrediting Commission. It is also home to the Savannah-Chatham school district's Scientific Research and Veterinary Science Specialty Programming.

== History ==
Islands High School began instruction in August 2010 to fill the need of a high school for the growing number of students on Whitemarsh, Wilmington, Talahi, and Tybee Islands, and to reduce the overcrowding that was being experienced by other schools. The school used the building previously occupied by Coastal Middle School, retrofitting it to meet the needs of older students. Coastal Middle shifted to the Islands Elementary building, and Islands Elementary was closed. Danielle Pinkerton was principal from the school's inception to 2014.

In 2012, Islands teacher Allison Konter was named SCCPSS district teacher of the year.

In 2013, Islands started its first junior varsity football team, and in 2014 it started its first varsity football team.

The principal of Islands High School as of August 2020 is Derrick Butler.

In 2016, Islands was one of five Georgia schools to win an AP Champion Award.

In 2020, Islands teacher Megan Heberle was awarded the Presidential Awards for Excellence in Mathematics and Science Teaching (PAEMST).

== Student activities ==
=== Academic competitions ===
- Mock Trial Team
- Literary Quiz Bowl
- GHSA Literary Competition

=== Athletics ===
- Baseball
- Basketball
- Cheerleading
- Cross country
- Football
- Golf
- Lacrosse
- Soccer
- Softball
- Swimming
- Tennis
- Track
- Volleyball
- Wrestling

=== Clubs and organizations ===
- Chorus
- Concert Band
- Drama Club
- French Club
- Future Business Leaders of America
- Future Farmers of America
- Jazz Band (spring)
- Marching Band (fall/winter)
- National Honor Society
- Parent Teacher Student Association
- Student Leadership Program
- Student Senate
- Symphonic Band
- Tri-M National Music Honor Society
- GLOW Club/GSA
