= Little Ogeechee River (Chatham County) =

Coordinates: 31.89161°N 81.09483°W

Location
- Country: United States

Physical characteristics
- Source
  - location: Georgia

The Little Ogeechee River in Chatham County is one of two rivers by that name in the U.S. state of Georgia. Rising in southern Effingham County, the Little Ogeechee flows to the southeast and enters Chatham County, where it becomes tidal in the vicinity of its crossing by U.S. Route 17. From that point, the river flows through salt marshes and widens considerably, crossing under Georgia State Route 204 west of the Windsor Forest section of Savannah, and ending at Ossabaw Sound just north of the mouth of the Ogeechee River. The entire Little Ogeechee River is 42.8 miles (68.9 km) long.

== See also ==
- List of rivers of Georgia
