= Savannah-Chatham County Public Schools =

School district in Georgia (U.S. state)

Savannah-Chatham County Public School System

Address
- 208 Bull Street Savannah, Georgia, 31401-3901; United States
- Coordinates: 32.076304°N 81.0930214°W

District information
- Type: Urban public
- Grades: Pre-kindergarten – 12
- Superintendent: S. Denise Watts
- Accreditation: Southern Association of Colleges and Schools
- Budget: $608,904,000

Students and staff
- Students: 36,326 (2022–23)
- Faculty: 2,675.00 (FTE)
- Staff: 2,862.50 (FTE)
- Student–teacher ratio: 13.58

Other information
- Telephone: (912) 395-5600
- Website: sccpss.com

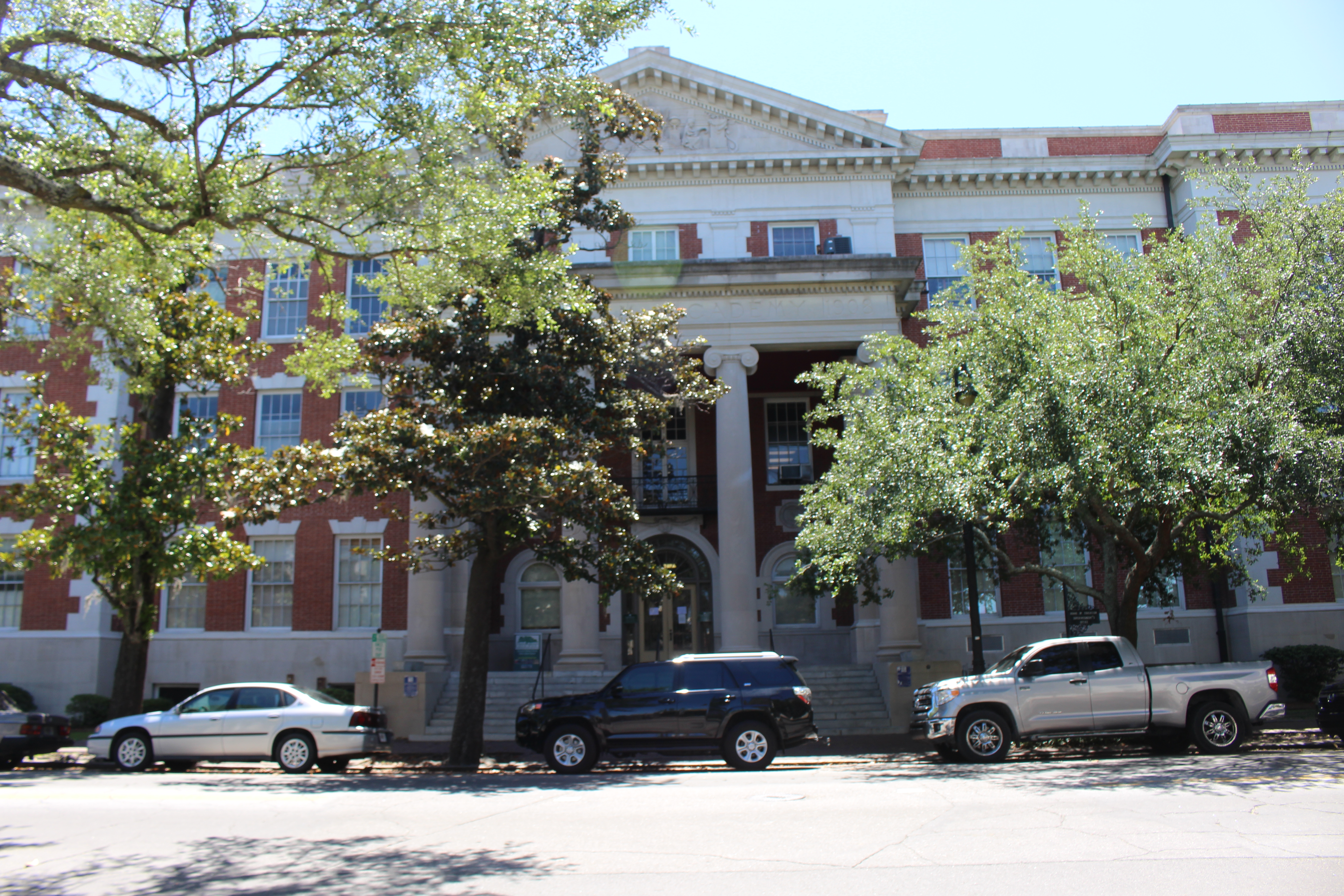
District headquarters

The Savannah-Chatham County Public School System (SCCPSS) is a public school district in Chatham County, Georgia, United States. SCCPSS is run by an elected Board of Public Education and operates the non-charter public schools in Chatham County, including those in the city of Savannah. It is the sole public school district in the county. The current superintendent is S. Denise Watts, Ed.D.

The district has an enrollment of over 35,925 students and operates 23 elementary schools, eight middle schools, eight K-8 schools, and 11 high schools. It also runs satellite facilities including the Massie Heritage Center (a preserved historic school) and the Oatland Island Wildlife Center (a wildlife refuge and environmental education complex). The school system supports two alternative schools for middle and/or high school students as well as an adult learning center.

== Administration ==
=== Board of Public Education ===
Current School Board members ^{[A]}
President	Mr. Roger Moss Jr.
District 1	Denise R. Grabowski
District 2	Dr. Dionne L. Hoskins-Brown
District 3	Corneila H. Hall
District 4	Shawn A. Kachmar
District 5	Rev. Paul E. Smith
District 6	David A. Bringman
District 7	Michael Johnson
District 8	Tonia Howard-Hall

The Savannah Chatham County Public School Board is the elected policy-making branch of the school district's administration. Eight board members, each representing a geographic district that coincides with those of the Chatham County Commission, are elected to a four-year term. The board president is elected county-wide for a four-year term.

=== Superintendent ===
The superintendent of schools is appointed by the Savannah Chatham County Board of Education and is charged with implementing the board's policies and the overall administration of the school system. Dr. Denise Watts was hired as superintendent on June 15, 2023.

== Schools ==
=== Elementary schools ===
- Bloomingdale Elementary School
- Brock Elementary School
- Butler Elementary School
- Gadsden Elementary School
- Garden City Elementary School
- Gould Elementary School
- Haven Elementary School
- Heard Elementary School
- Hodge Elementary School
- Howard Elementary School
- Juliette Low Elementary School
- Marshpoint Elementary School
- Pooler Elementary School
- Port Wentworth Elementary
- J.G. Smith Elementary School
- Southwest Elementary School
- Andrea B. Williams Elementary School
- West Chatham Elementary School
- White Bluff Elementary School
- Windsor Forest Elementary School

^{[D]}

=== Middle schools ===
- STEM at Bartlett Middle School
- Coastal Middle School
- DeRenne Middle School
- Hubert Middle School
- Mercer Middle School
- Myers Middle School
- Oglethorpe Charter Middle School
- Southwest Middle School
- West Chatham Middle School

^{[C]}

=== K-8 schools ===
- Ellis Montessori
- Esther F. Garrison
- Georgetown
- Godley Station
- Hesse
- Isle of Hope
- New Hampstead K-8
- Rice Creek
- The White House
- Pulaski k-8

=== High schools ===
- Alfred E. Beach High School
- Robert W. Groves High School
- Islands High School
- Herschel V. Jenkins High School
- Sol C. Johnson High School
- New Hampstead High School
- Savannah Arts Academy
- Savannah High School
- Savannah Early College High School
- Windsor Forest High School
- Woodville Tompkins Technical & Career High School

^{[B]}

=== Charter schools ===
- Coastal Empire Montessori
- Oglethorpe Charter School
- Savannah Classical Academy
- Tybee Island Maritime Academy
- Susie King Taylor Community School

=== Virtual learning ===
- Savannah Chatham E-Learning Academy (SCELA)

=== Satellite facilities ===
- Massie Heritage Interpretation Center
- Oatland Island Wildlife Center

== Former Schools ==
=== Richard Arnold High School ===
Opened in 1922 as 35th Street School, a junior high facility; renamed Richard Arnold Junior High School later that decade. Converted to Commercial High School in the late 1930s and renamed to Richard Arnold High School in 1965 after desegregation of public schools. Operations transitioned from serving high-school students into adult education during the early 1980s before closing entirely by 1994.

The Georgian-revival style building was purchased for restoration by the Savannah College of Art and Design in 2006, and reopened in 2008 as Arnold Hall. The building features a 400-seat gymnasium/auditorium with a preserved proscenium featuring a carved eagle in the center, surrounded by murals of local founding fathers and references to two New Deal programs.

The school was named after four-term Savannah mayor Richard Arnold.

=== Commercial High School ===
Operating out of the same building as Richard Arnold High School, Commercial High School served as a business and vocational school from the 1930s until 1965.

=== East Broad K-8 School ===
Opened in 1989 and repurposed in 2019 to the Early Learning Center at Henderson E. Formey Jr. School.

=== Islands Elementary School ===
Operating from 1992 to 2010, the school was shut down as a part of a campus transitioning plan for schools on Whitemarsh Island. Coastal Middle School shifted over to the Islands Elementary School Building, so that Islands High School could take over the former middle school campus.

=== Largo-Tibet Elementary School ===
Opened in 1969 on the southside of Savannah, the building was closed as a permanent school in 2024 due to concerns of the building being in a flood zone. As of closing, the district plans to renovate the building to be used as a swing site to temporarily house other district schools as needed.

=== Pearl Lee Smith School ===
Originally built as the Springfield Terrace School in 1926 and renamed in 1958 after community activist Pearl Lee Smith. Smith organized the first Parent Teacher Association (PTA) in Savannah, and rallied the group to seek approval for a public school in the Carver Village neighborhood. The school was founded to serve African American students excluded from public schools elsewhere in the city.

Pearl Lee Smith School closed in 1991 after 65 years of serving historically black neighborhoods in Savannah. The building reopened in 1999 as Oglethorpe Academy, later Oglethorpe Charter School, before that school moved to a newly constructed building in 2012.

The building was added to the National Register of Historic Places in 2022 under the original Springfield Terrace School name. The city of received a grant in 2023 as part of a project to restore the building as a "community asset".

=== Romana Riley Elementary School ===
Opened in 1916 as the Waters Avenue School. The school was eventually renamed after former principal Romana Riley and operated until 1990. Riley's legacy at the school included launching one of the nation's first free lunch programs during the Great Depression, and shifting towards a "student-focused" teaching approach.

The Gothic-revival building sat empty until 2017 when it was converted into senior living apartments.

=== Scott Middle School ===
Opened in 1963 to accommodate growing population of the Woodville area, the school ceased operations as a traditional middle school in 1999 and transitioned to Scott Alternative Learning Center, a K-12 disciplinary and behavioral program for students removed from other schools in the district.

The Scott Alternative Learning Center closed in 2012, and was reformatted into Fresh Start (serving elementary aged children) and Building Bridges Academy (serving older students in separate middle and high school buildings). The latter operates its high school facility out of the former Scott Middle School building.

Scott Middle School was named for Walter S. Scott, a prominent businessman in Savannah

=== Shuman Elementary/Middle School ===
Named for local advertising businessman and Board of Education member Leiston Shuman Sr. Opening sometime in the 1960s, the middle school was converted to Shuman Elementary School for the 2010–2011 school year. The elementary school shut down after the 2024–2025 school year due to low enrollment and an aging building.

=== Tompkins Middle/High School ===
Formerly the Woodville school, opened around 1875 as a one-room school house to serve the westside of Savannah. A larger facility was constructed in 1917, and Woodville shifted exclusively to a high school in 1947. Renamed to Tompkins High school in 1955 following retirement of longtime principal Sophronia Gaston Tompkins, who first took on the role in 1922 as the first African-American principal of a Savannah school.

Tompkins High School was converted to a middle school in 1989, and eventually began operating as a technical and career institute before alumni successfully petitioned for the school to transition back into a high school. The school reopened as Woodville-Tompkins High School in 2011, combining technical courses with academic learning.

=== Thunderbolt Elementary School ===
Originally opened as a one-room schoolhouse in 1890, the modern facility (opened in 1956) was shut down at the end of the 2016–2017 school year due to deteriorating conditions. The building was sold to the Tybee Maritime Academy in July 2026 with the goal of converting the facility to their permanent campus.

== Notes ==
A. List information from "District Board of Education". Savannah-Chatham County Public Schools. Archived from the original on June 12, 2008.
B. List information from "High Schools". Savannah-Chatham County Public Schools.
C. List information from "Middle Schools". Savannah-Chatham County Public Schools. Archived from the original on March 3, 2008.
D. List information from "Elementary Schools". Savannah-Chatham County Public Schools. Archived from the original on March 3, 2008.
E. List information from "K-8 Schools". Savannah-Chatham County Public Schools. Archived from the original on May 18, 2012. School is closed every school
