= Georgetown, Chatham County, Georgia =

Georgetown, Georgia
- Unincorporated community Census-designated place
- Location in Chatham County and the state of Georgia
- Country: United States
- State: Georgia
- Counties: Chatham

Area
  - Total: 8.86 sq mi (22.96 km^{2})
  - Land: 8.24 sq mi (21.34 km^{2})
  - Water: 0.62 sq mi (1.61 km^{2})
- Elevation: 13 ft (4.0 m)

Population (2020)
  - Total: 11,916
  - Density: 1,445.9/sq mi (558.27/km^{2})
- FIPS code: 13-32482
- GNIS feature ID: 1694531

Georgetown is an unincorporated community and census-designated place (CDP) in Chatham County, Georgia, United States. The population was 11,916 at the 2020 census. Georgetown lies across the Little Ogeechee River (and city limits) from Savannah, Georgia, and is a suburban "bedroom community" of Savannah, where most of its adult residents work. It is part of the Savannah Metropolitan Statistical Area.

Georgetown was constructed mostly in the late 1970s and early 1980s, but new subdivisions have been built recently. Shopping facilities are now more plentiful and continue to be added. Two schools in Georgetown are units of the Savannah-Chatham public school system: Georgetown Elementary and Southwest Middle School. Georgetown's public high school students attend Windsor Forest High School in Savannah.

== Geography ==
Georgetown is located in western Chatham County at 31°58′47″N 81°13′56″W. It is bordered to the east, south, and west by portions of the city of Savannah and has lost area since the 2000 census due to annexations by city. To the northwest is the unincorporated community of Henderson. U.S. Route 17 forms the northwestern edge of Georgetown, and leads northeast 11 miles (18 km) to downtown Savannah and southwest 5 miles (8 km) to Richmond Hill. Veterans Parkway begins in the eastern part of Georgetown and also leads 11 miles (18 km) to the center of Savannah.

According to the United States Census Bureau, the Georgetown CDP has a total area of 8.8 square miles (22.7 km^{2}), of which 8.2 square miles (21.3 km^{2}) is land and 0.54 square miles (1.4 km^{2}), or 6.30%, is water.

== Demographics ==
Historical population
Census	Pop.	Note	%±
1980	2,785		—
1990	5,554		99.4%
2000	10,599		90.8%
2010	11,823		11.5%
2020	11,916		0.8%
U.S. Decennial Census; 1850-1870 1870-1880; 1890-1910 1920-1930; 1940 1950 1960; 1970 1980 1990; 2000 2010 2020

Georgetown was first listed as a CDP in the 1980 United States census.

=== 2020 census ===
Georgetown, Georgia – Racial and ethnic composition Note: the US Census treats Hispanic/Latino as an ethnic category. This table excludes Latinos from the racial categories and assigns them to a separate category. Hispanics/Latinos may be of any race.
Race / Ethnicity (NH = Non-Hispanic)	Pop 2000	Pop 2010	Pop 2020	% 2000	% 2010	2020
White alone (NH)	7,458	6,876	5,736	70.37%	58.16%	48.14%
Black or African American alone (NH)	2,093	3,216	3,930	19.75%	27.20%	32.98%
Native American or Alaska Native alone (NH)	35	35	24	0.33%	0.30%	0.20%
Asian alone (NH)	325	409	374	3.07%	3.46%	3.14%
Pacific Islander alone (NH)	4	20	29	0.04%	0.17%	0.24%
Some Other Race alone (NH)	22	28	59	0.21%	0.24%	0.50%
Mixed Race or Multi-Racial (NH)	172	317	585	1.62%	2.68%	4.91%
Hispanic or Latino (any race)	490	922	1,179	4.62%	7.80%	9.89%
Total	10,599	11,823	11,916	100.00%	100.00%	100.00%

As of the 2020 United States census, there were 11,916 people, 4,971 households, and 3,741 families residing in the CDP.

== Education ==
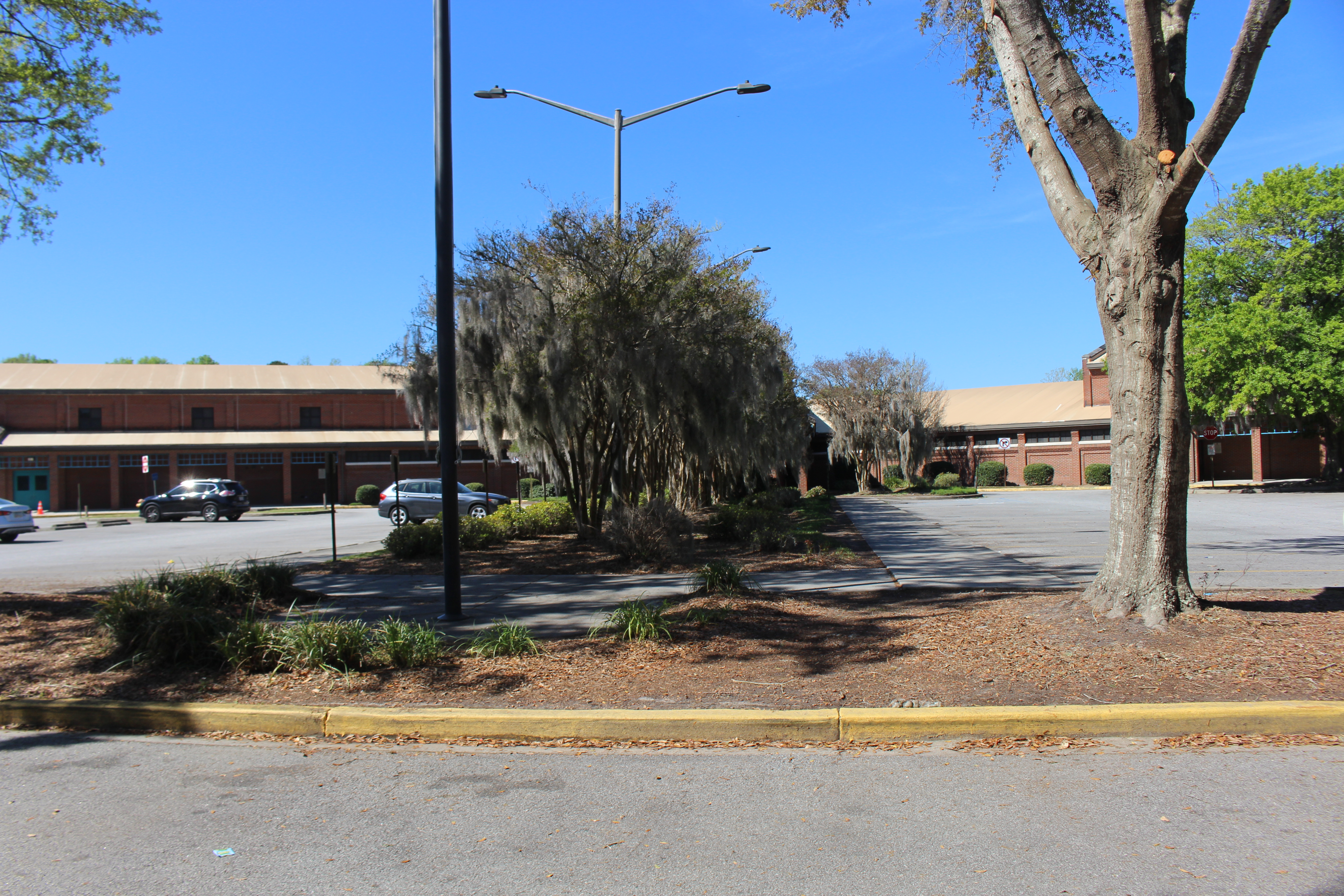
Georgetown K-8 School

It is in the Savannah-Chatham County Public Schools. Schools include:

- Georgetown K-8 School
