= Siege of Fort Pulaski =

Action of the American Civil War

Coordinates: 32.02729°N 80.89096°W

Battle of Fort Pulaski
- Part of the American Civil War
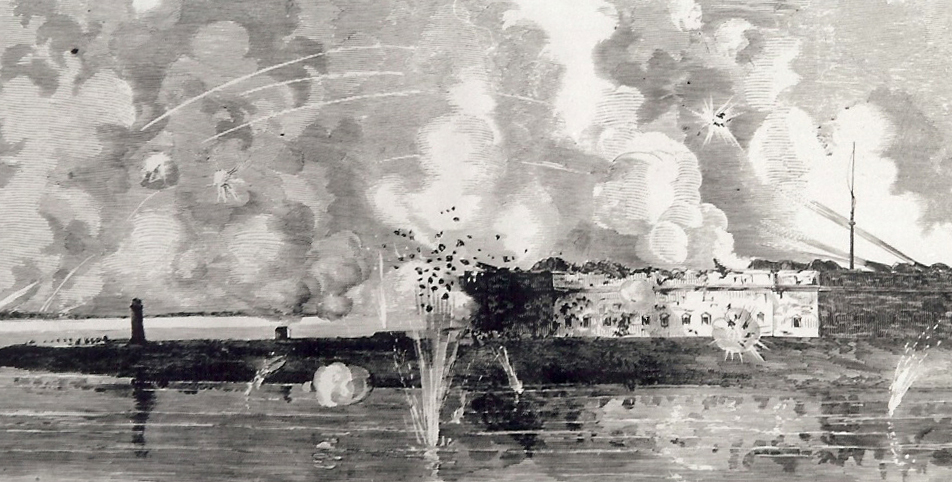
- Fort Pulaski during the second day's bombardment
Date	April 10–11, 1862
Location	Chatham County, Georgia
Result	Union victory

Belligerents
United States (Union)	CSA (Confederacy)

Commanders and leaders
Samuel F. DuPont; David Hunter; Quincy A. Gillmore	Robert E. Lee; Josiah Tattnall III; Charles H. Olmstead

Units involved
Department of the South; South Atlantic Squadron; 15 warships, 36 transports Tybee Island besiegers 10,000 officers and men 36 guns of all calibers 5 Parrotts, 5 James rifles	Dept. of SC, Ga., Florida; Savannah River Sqdrn; 3 warships, 2 transports Fort Pulaski garrison 385 officers and men 48 guns of all calibers 2 Blakely rifled cannons

Casualties and losses
1 killed Several wounded	Several mortally wounded 363 captured

The siege of Fort Pulaski (or the siege and reduction of Fort Pulaski) concluded with the battle of Fort Pulaski fought April 10–11, 1862, during the American Civil War. Union forces on Tybee Island and naval operations conducted a 112-day siege, then captured the Confederate-held Fort Pulaski after a 30-hour bombardment. The siege and battle are important for innovative use of rifled guns which made existing coastal defenses obsolete. The Union initiated large-scale amphibious operations under fire.

The fort's surrender strategically closed Savannah as a port. The Union extended its blockade and aids to navigation down the Atlantic coast, then redeployed most of its 10,000 troops. The Confederate army-navy defense blocked Federal advance for over three months, secured the city, and prevented any subsequent Union advance from seaward during the war. Coastal rail connections were extended to blockaded Charleston, South Carolina.

Fort Pulaski is located on Cockspur Island, Georgia, near the mouth of the Savannah River. The fort commanded seaward approaches to the City of Savannah. The city was commercially and industrially important as a cotton exporting port, railroad center and the largest manufacturing center in the state, including a state arsenal and private shipyards. Two southerly estuaries led to the Savannah River behind the fort. Immediately east of Pulaski, and in sight of Hilton Head Island, South Carolina, lay Tybee Island with a lighthouse station.

== Background ==
Fort Pulaski was built as a "Third System" fort in the United States system of coastal defense on land ceded to the United States by the State of Georgia. Authorized by appropriations begun by Congress under the James Madison administration, construction of Third System forts was directed under U.S. Secretaries of War including James Monroe of Virginia, William H. Crawford of Georgia, and John C. Calhoun of South Carolina.

The new construction replaced two earlier forts on Tybee Island. A British colonial fort was torn down in the American Revolution. The first U.S. fort, authorized in the Washington Administration, was swept away in an 1804 hurricane. Construction began on Fort Pulaski during 1830, and was completed in 1845 in the administration of John Tyler by a successor of U.S. Secretary of War John Bell of Tennessee. The new fort was named to honor Casimir Pulaski, the Polish hero of the American Revolution.

The Third System fort expanded Savannah's defenses downriver from "Old" Fort Jackson, a "Second System" fort which had been built nearby the city to defend the immediate approaches to its wharves. In the campaigns for national elections in 1860, Southerners threatened to secede from the United States if Abraham Lincoln was elected president. Following the policy of President James Buchanan and his Secretary of War John B. Floyd of Virginia, the newly inaugurated Lincoln Administration at first did not garrison and defend forts, arsenals or U.S. Treasury Mints in the South. The policy was continued until April 12, 1861, when South Carolina militia bombarded Fort Sumter, South Carolina, just north along the Atlantic Coast from Fort Pulaski.

=== "Department of Georgia" ===
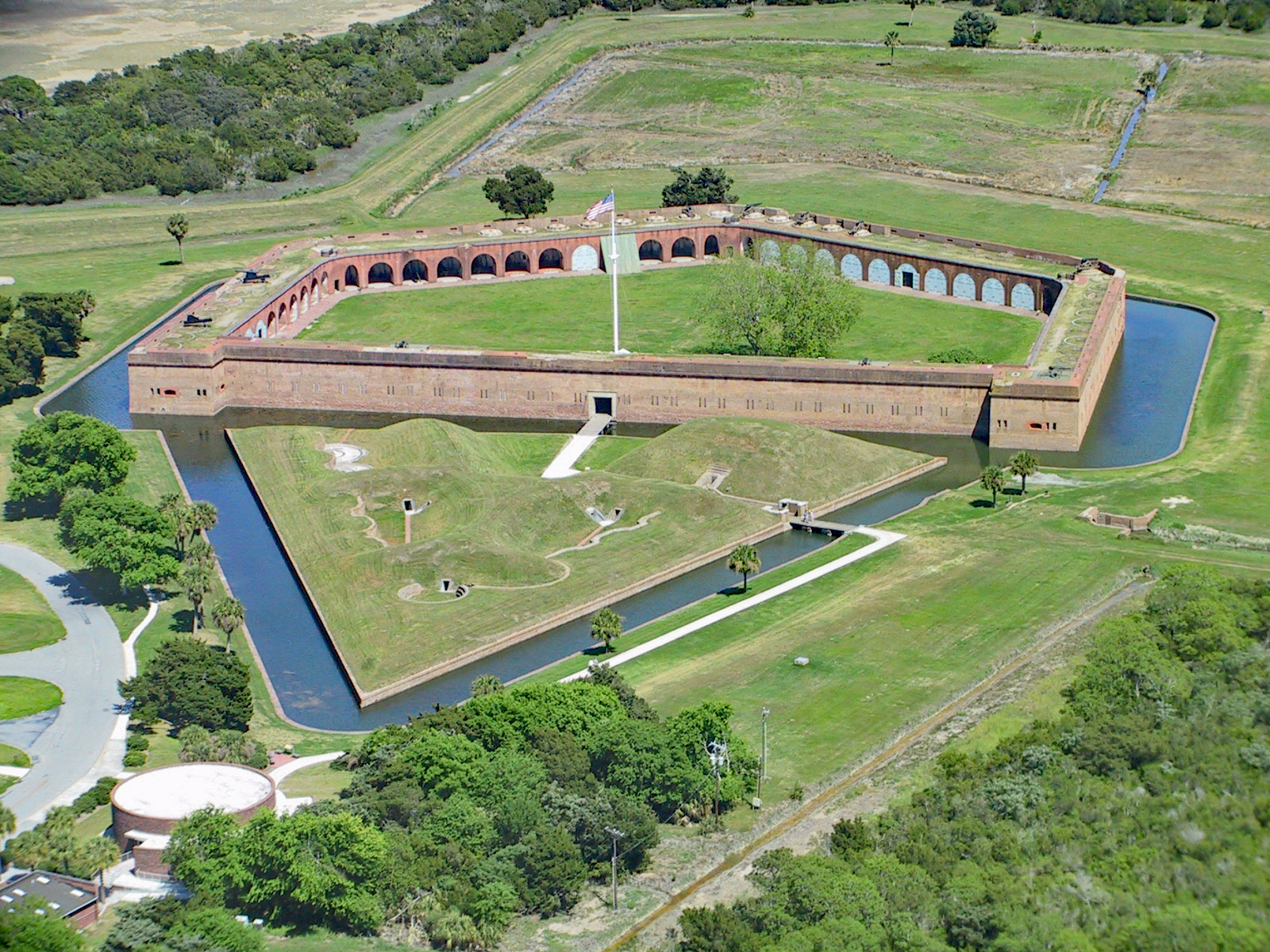
Fort Pulaski

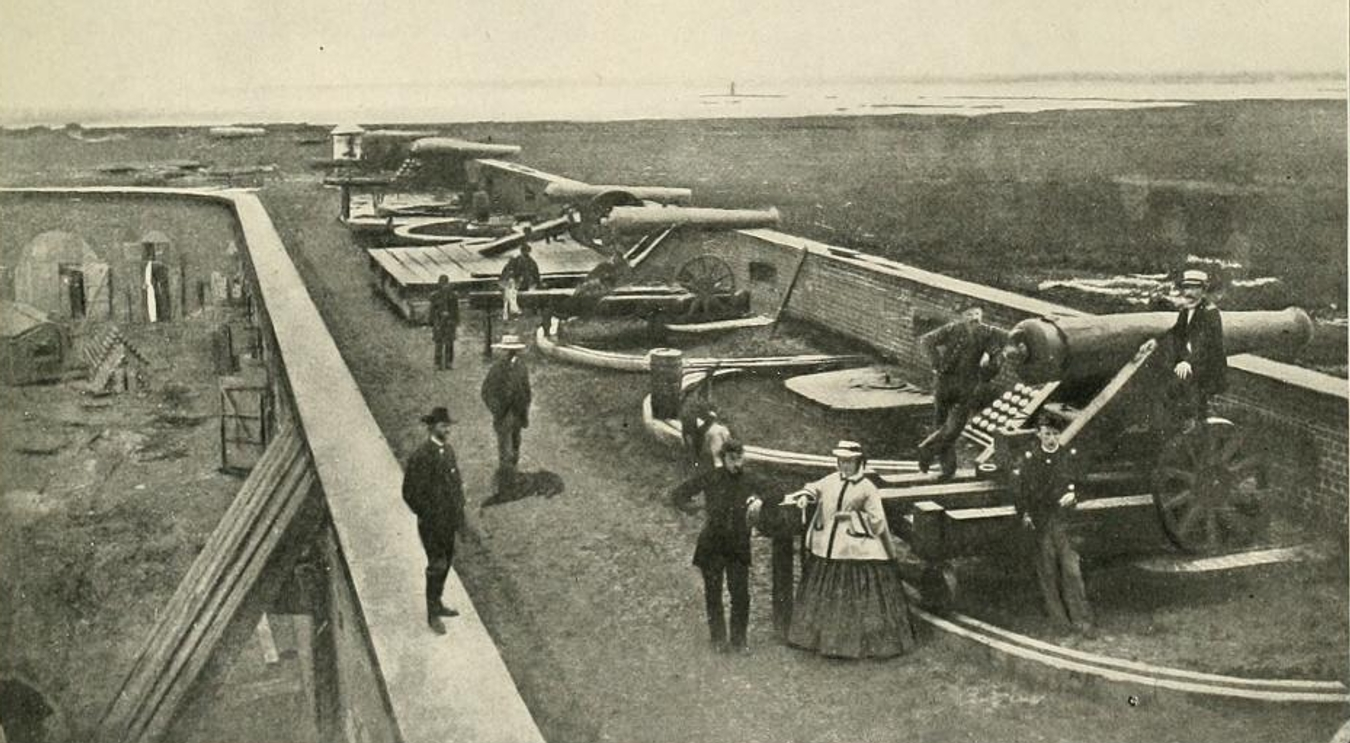
Southeast parapet, south wall barbette guns

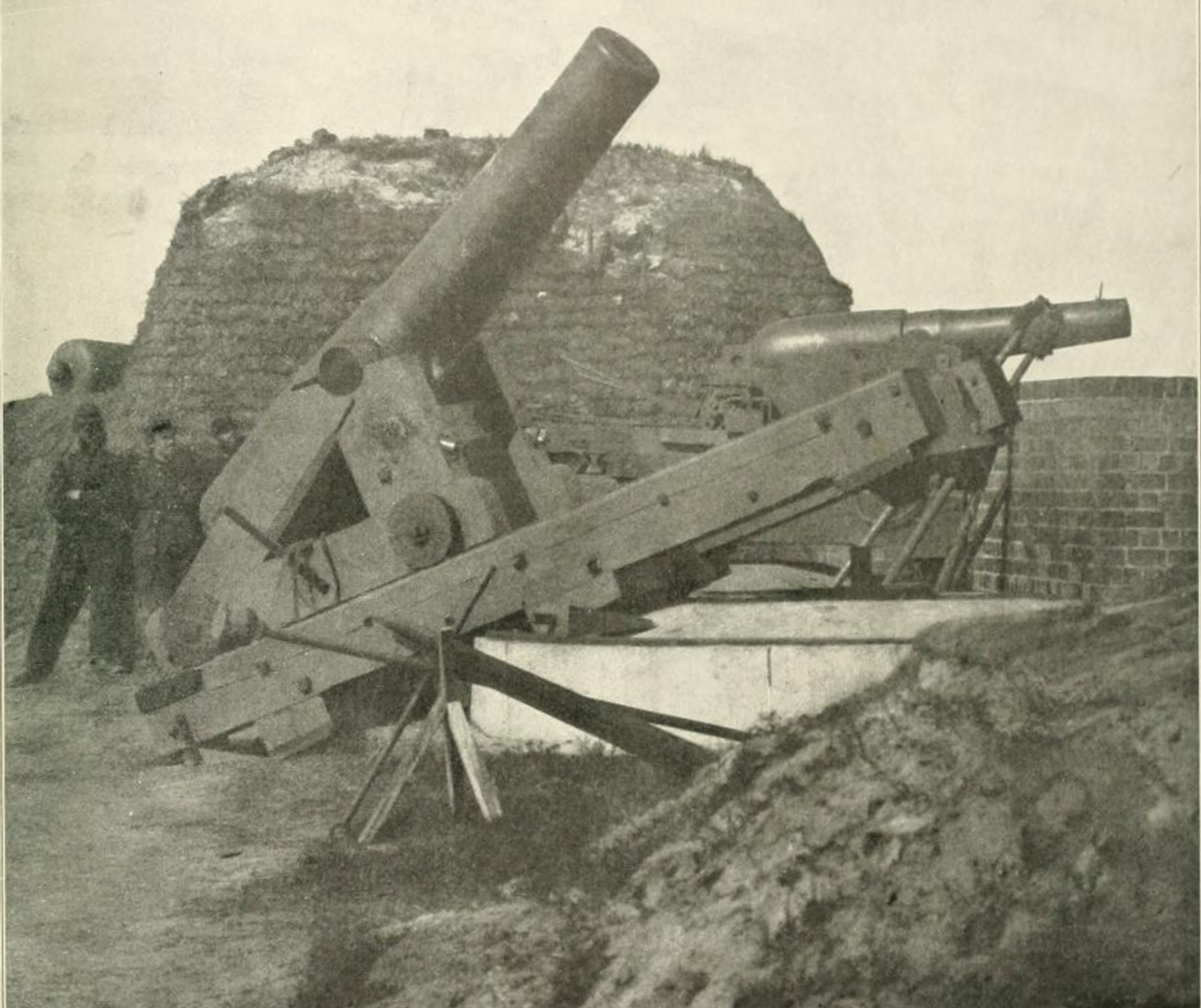
8-in. gun as a mortar held Union to night movement

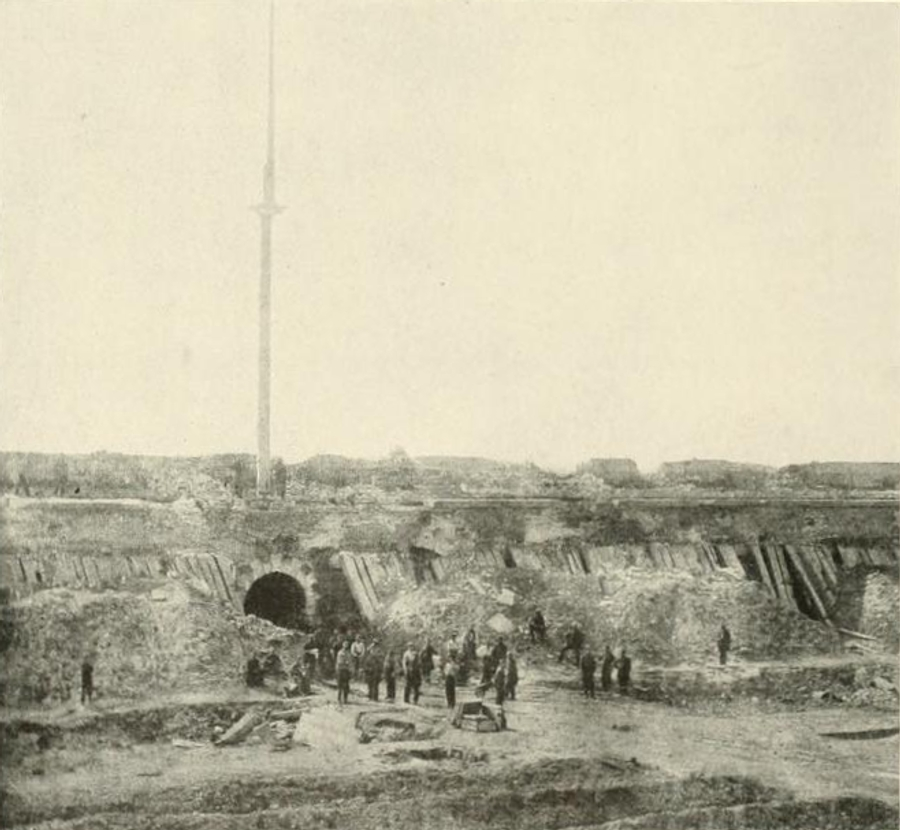
Bombproofs of timbers, yard trenched for ricochets

On January 3, 1861, 16 days before the secession of Georgia from the Union, volunteer militia seized Fort Pulaski from the Federal government and, with Confederate forces, began repairing and upgrading the armament. In late 1861, the commander, Department of Georgia, Brigadier General Alexander Robert Lawton would transfer to Richmond. On November 5, General Robert E. Lee assumed command of the newly created "Department of South Carolina, Georgia and Florida", headquartering in Savannah. He had helped construct the fort in his early military career and was familiar with the terrain and tides.

Lawton's October report for his department listed 2,753 men and officers in the environs of Savannah, almost half of the command. First Georgia Regulars had been assigned to Tybee Island. They built a battery on Tybee Island and manned it, along with lookouts along the beach. The Regiment was reassigned to Virginia, departing July 17, 1861. Olmstead's "First Volunteer Regiment of Georgia" would garrison Fort Pulaski through the Federal siege.

Fort Pulaski was considered invincible with its 7-1/2-foot solid brick walls and reinforcing masonry piers. Lee had earlier surveyed the fort's defenses with Colonel Olmstead and determined, "they will make it pretty warm for you here with shells, but they cannot breach your walls at that distance." Wide swampy marshes surrounded the fort on all sides and were infested with native alligators. No attacking ship could safely come within effective range, and land batteries could not be placed closer than Tybee Island, one to two miles away. Beyond 700 yards (640 meters), smoothbore guns and mortars had little chance to break through heavy masonry walls. Beyond 1,000 yards (910 m), they had no chance at all. Prior to the war, the U.S. Chief of Engineers, Colonel Joseph Gilbert Totten is quoted as saying of the fort, "you might as well bombard the Rocky Mountains." If there were ever to be a successful siege, it would have to starve the garrison into submission.

=== Defense in depth ===
When Federal forces first made a lodgment on Tybee Island, the work on Fort Pulaski was progressing slowly, but Lee's judgment as the district's commanding general was that "the river cannot be forced". Old Fort Jackson had been armed, strengthened and "forms an interior barrier". Savannah's channel had been blocked. In December, Lee reasoned that, since the Federals had sunk a stone fleet in the Charleston Harbor, they did not intend to use it. "We must endeavor to be prepared against assaults elsewhere on the Southern coast." To that end, ships were sunk by the Confederates in the water approaches that led behind Fort Pulaski.

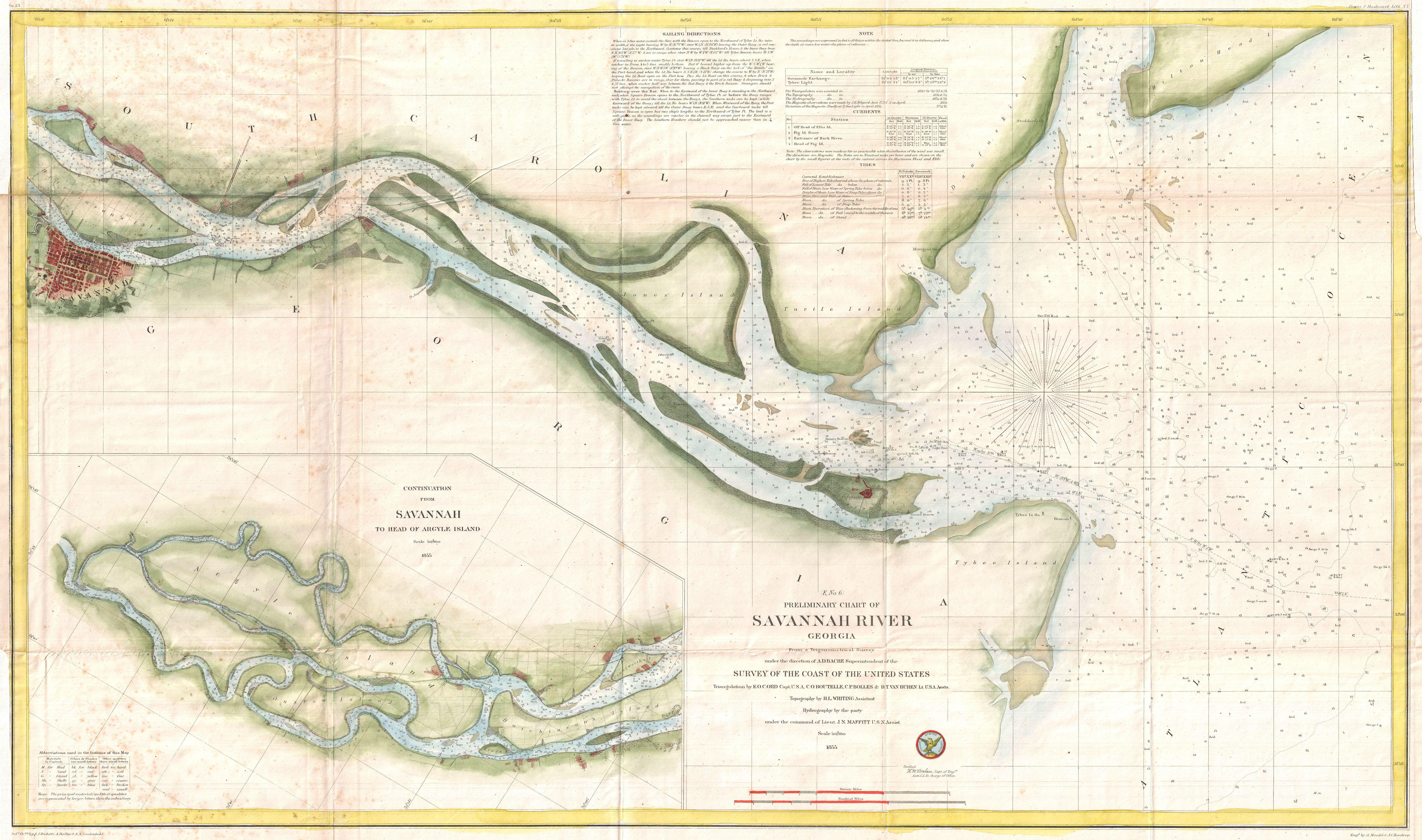
1855 navigation chart. City of Savannah mapped left in red, "Old Fort Jackson" center, Fort Pulaski on Cockspur Island at river's mouth. North shore of Tybee Island at lower right.

Lee brought Commodore Josiah Tattnall from a James River command and would employ sailors to service at a battery across from Savannah's Fort Jackson. (Note: Tattnall had similarly employed sailors to man shore batteries in defense of Richmond immediately following the Battle of Hampton Roads.) Turning his attention to Fort Pulaski's defenses, Lee anticipated Union moves to establish batteries above the fort. He ordered guns positioned to cover their likely positions were the Federals to get behind Pulaski in a siege attempt.

In January, following Tattnall's three-gunboat attack on seven Federal gunboats on the river, Lee's assessment was that "there is nothing to prevent their reaching the Savannah River, and we have nothing afloat that can contend against them." Fort Pulaski, a "Third System", scientifically engineered coastal defense fort, still had at least four months' provisions. Now, the primary objective became, "we must endeavor to defend the city." The city's floating dock was sunk as another river obstruction.

In March, Lee passed along War Department orders to begin transferring regiments from Florida to Tennessee to reinstate operations following the "disasters to our arms" there. Georgian troops had been sent to Virginia in July, additional Georgians would be moved to Tennessee also. The Confederate government required a withdrawal from seaboard forces into the interior of South Carolina and Georgia to better secure the breadbasket plantations feeding the armies. In Florida, only the Apalachicola River had to be defended at all costs because Federal gunboats could penetrate so deeply into the Georgia interior.

On Lee's transfer to Richmond, he detailed urgent defense construction, then he called on Lawton's "earnest and close attention" to the Federal's probable approach to the city. "It looks now as if he would take the Savannah River". Guns located in island batteries were to be removed to the mainland in and around Savannah's defensive lines. Obstructions in the river above the city were to be set by hands provided by upriver planters in the event of an envelopment by way of Fort McAllister. "Every effort must be made" to retard or prevent further progress of the enemy directly upriver on the Savannah River approaches. "If he attempts to advance by batteries on the marshes or islands, he must be driven back, if possible." Scouts were ordered out "so as to discover his first lodgment, when they can be broken up." An additional three-gun battery at MacKay's Point was not intended to stop federal gunboats in force, but with Tattnall's gunboat support, they could prevent Federal batteries from being built on Elba Island to threaten Old Fort Jackson.

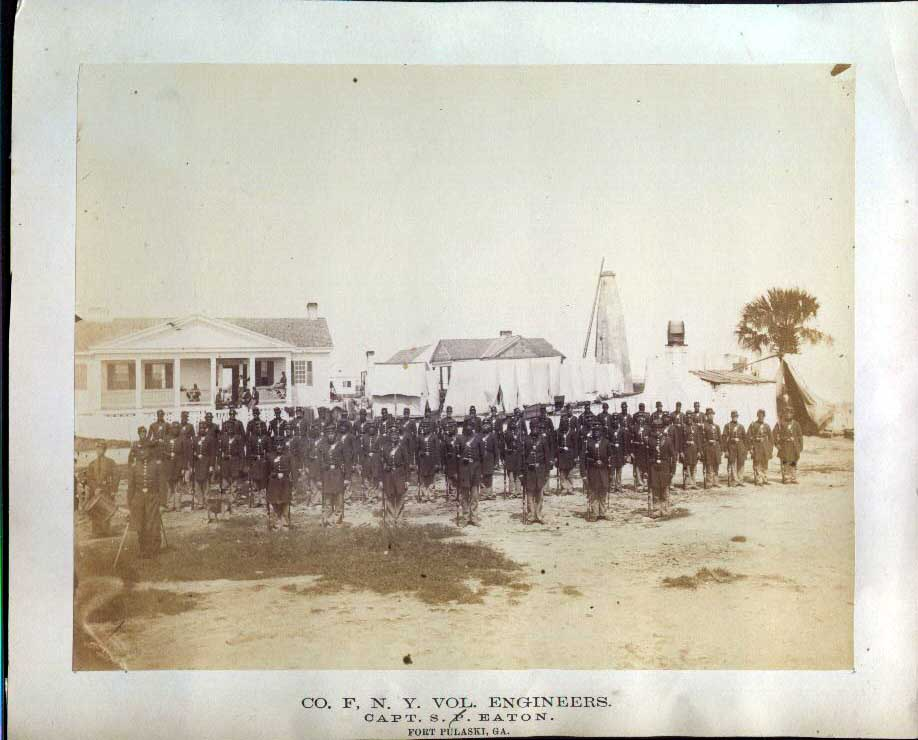
Rebel-burned Lighthouse rises behind a Union engineer company.

Savannah's existing Fort Jackson, about three miles downriver from the city, was supplemented with two additional batteries. Defenders built fire barges. Lee first placed a battery at Causton's Bluff commanding navigable estuaries leading to the Savannah River behind Fort Pulaski. Then he added another battery situated farther upriver on Elba Island, blocking all river approaches to Savannah. The Union naval commander, Flag Officer Samuel F. Du Pont, conducted a reconnaissance of Lee's system of defense upriver. When the commanding military general, Brigadier General Thomas W. Sherman, insisted on forcing Lee's riverine batteries against Du Pont's recommendation, Sherman was transferred to the western theater and replaced by Major General David Hunter.

The Union fleet conducted explorations among the Atlantic inlets and coastal marshes by shallow draft ships, boats and monitors. But when they came up against earthworks such as Fort McAllister just south of Savannah, their efforts using bombardment alone were fruitless.

At the time Pulaski was cut off from Savannah in April 1862, the garrison under the command of Colonel Charles H. Olmstead had been reduced from 650 to 385 officers and men. They were organized into five infantry companies and had 48 cannons, including ten columbiads, five mortars, and a 4.5-inch (114 mm) Blakely rifle. The Confederate Tybee Island battery had been previously dismantled and abandoned, and their guns relocated to the fort. The fort had been provisioned on January 28 with a six-month supply of food.

In consultation with Lee, Olmstead had distributed armament on the ramparts and in the casements to cover all approaches, and several were placed to cover westerly marshes and Savannah's North Channel. Confederate marauders burned sea island cotton crops to deny them falling into Federal hands. Navigational aids like the Tybee Lighthouse were dismantled and burned. Reports from the field had Confederate troops setting fires to everything that might be used by advancing Federal troops.

In August 1861, the Union secretary of war, Simon Cameron, authorized a combined army and navy expeditionary corps. Sherman commanded the army elements, and Flag Officer Samuel Du Pont commanded the naval services. The objectives were: to recapture Fort Pulaski as federal property; to close the port of Savannah to the rebels; and, to extend the blockade southward. First they needed a coaling station for the South Atlantic Squadron. The coaling station could then serve as a base for the expedition. The capture of Port Royal harbor answered the immediate requirement for a nearby staging area.

== Federal advance ==
After building up facilities on Hilton Head Island, the Federals began preparations for besieging Fort Pulaski.

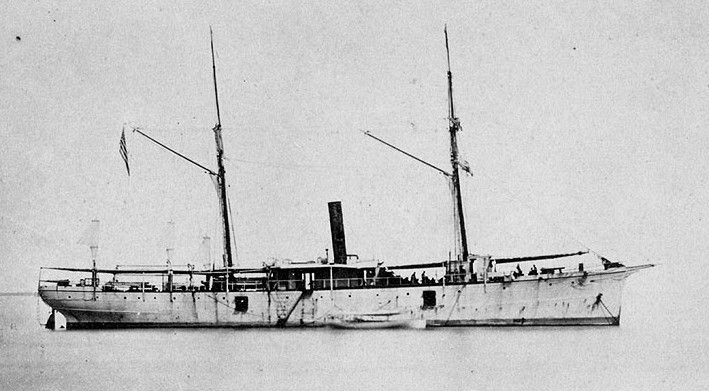
Like this blockade runner, Fingal ran the Union Blockade. Fingal could not get out, later was converted to an Ironclad.

The Union advance on Fort Pulaski began on November 24, 1861. Following reconnaissance that Confederates had abandoned Tybee Island, Du Pont ordered forward an amphibious raid with three gunboats at the Tybee Island Lighthouse. Under a two-hour ship's bombardment, the Confederate pickets set fire to the lighthouse and withdrew. Commander Christopher Rodgers, USS Flag, led a landing party of sailors and Marines in thirteen surf-boats to occupy the lighthouse and the Martello tower, and flew the national flag from them. Overnight, a reduced company set false campfires to misdirect the Confederates ashore. Two days later Du Pont and Sherman made a personal reconnaissance, and on 29 November, Major General Quincy Adams Gillmore, the command's chief engineering officer, with three companies of the Fourth New Hampshire, took formal possession of the entire island without opposition. The navy set the logistics train in motion, and by December 20, the army had sufficient materials for establishing "a permanent possession".

The last blockade runner to make Savannah was the British steam ship Fingal. Its cargo of arms and munitions reached the entrance to Wassaw Sound at the mouth of the Savannah River on a clear night in mid November, but heavy fog in the early morning masked the ship's progress across the bar and upriver. Later, she made two unsuccessful attempts at escaping the blockade before being converted into an ironclad. Pulaski's share on ship's manifest was two 24-pounder Blakely rifles and a large consignment of British-made Enfield infantry rifles. As Du Pont sought to close the alternative channels local ships used, he sank stone-filled ships in the Savannah River channel, and stationed gunboats at two southerly estuaries, Wassaw Sound, south of Wilmington Island, and Ossabaw Sound at Skidaway Island.

On November 26 Tattnall's flag, CSS "Old" Savannah, in company with Resolute and Sampson sortied out from under Fort Pulaski's guns in a "brave but brief" attack on the Union ships outside the bar, driving them out to sea. Tattnall's squadron withdrew up the Savannah River for refit and two days later, the same three resupplied the fort with six months provisions, despite "the spirited opposition of Federal ships". "Old Savannah was partially disabled but returned to harbor. Sampson received considerable damage, returning to patrol the Savannah River only in mid-November the following year.

== Siege ==
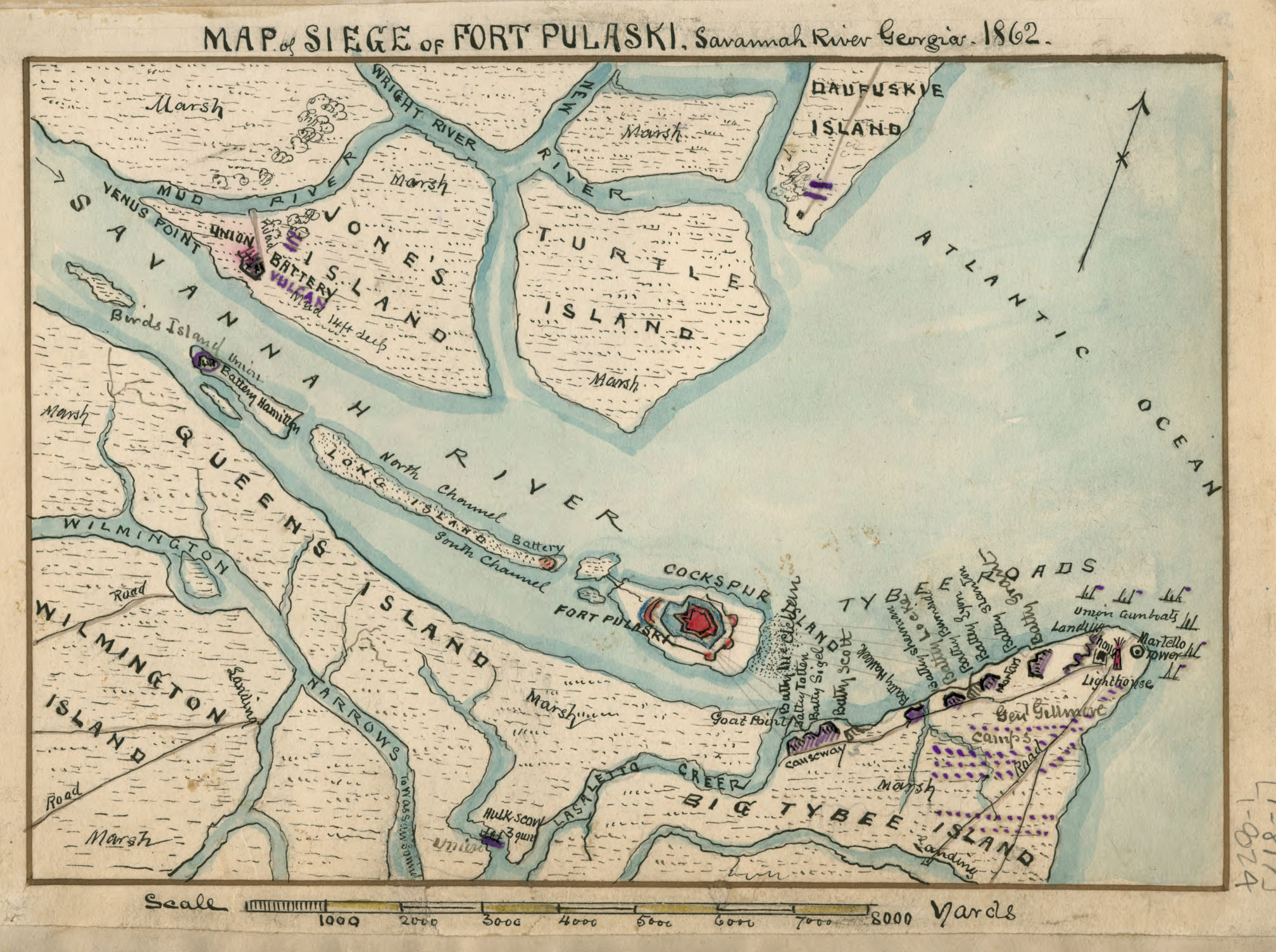
Map of the siege of Ft. Pulaski. Fort in red with outlying batteries, U.S. batteries in grey; besieging batteries upriver had infantry and gunboat support to cut off Pulaski from Savannah.

Following a reconnaissance of the ground, Gillmore proposed the unconventional plan to reduce Fort Pulaski with mortars and rifled guns. Sherman approved the plan, but not the promise of the rifled guns. His endorsement was qualified, believing gunnery effect would be limited, "to shake the walls in a random manner." But the innovative weaponry in the event made his deployed 10,000-man assault force unnecessary. Of the two senior military commanders leading up to the engagement, neither Union general, Sherman, nor Confederate general, Lee believed the fort could be captured by bombardment alone.

=== Approaches ===
Two sites for Federal batteries were selected upriver from the fort to cut it off from Savannah, just as Lee had anticipated. The first was at Point Venus at the east end of Jones Island along the north bank of the Savannah River North Channel. Tattnall had sunk a schooner to obstruct the northward channel connecting the river to the Union-held Port Royal, and he patrolled the river with Confederate gunboats. The Federals had to clear the obstruction on their most direct supply line first; it required three weeks. A camp and supply depot was established on the next island north, Dawfuskie Island.

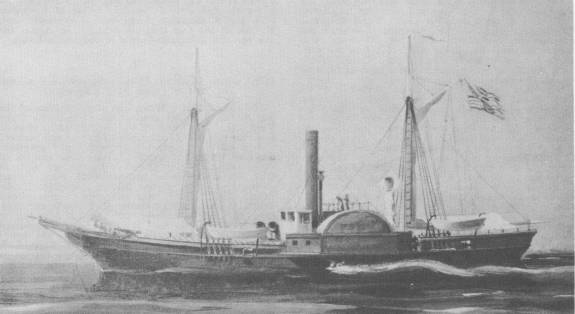
A sidewheeler gunboat, the CSS Water Witch like that used by C.S. Navy armed with one swivel-mounted gun at the bow

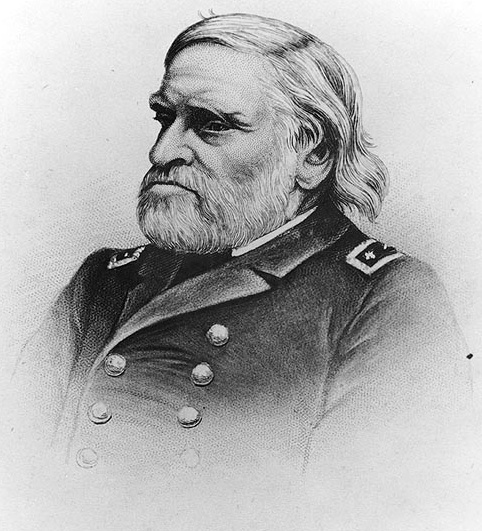
Josiah Tattnall III, Confederate Commodore

Tattnall's gunboats still commanded the lower river around Point Venus. As a part of Lee's active defense, the Confederate's Savannah River Squadron launched continuous patrols. Their naval gunnery required the work along the river by Union besiegers to be done at night. The Federal's guns had to be pulled by hand through swamp over moveable tram sections, the men working in brackish alligator-infested marsh, sinking in over their waist most of the day. The artillery then had to be placed on board-and-bag platforms to avoid their loss by sinking into the morass. The soldiers rested during the day.

By Lee's estimation, the fort could not be reduced by bombardment or direct assault, only by starvation, and would be secure as long as supplies could be built up. The last Confederate supply ship to Fort Pulaski was the small workhorse steamboat Ida. On February 13, it was on a routine run to the fort down the North Channel. The new battery of Federal heavy guns on the north bank opened up for the first time. The old side-wheeler ran for Pulaski and the battery got off nine shots before the guns recoiled off their platforms. Union troops went back to work modifying platform construction and resetting the cannon. Two days later Ida ran up the South Channel under the extinguished lighthouse and returned to Savannah through Tybee Creek.

Once the Union battery at Venus Point was disclosed, Confederate gunboats engaged in gunnery duels, but they were driven off. Over the next week, the besiegers completely surrounded the Fort. Federals built another battery on the Savannah River across from Venus Point. They threw a boom across Tybee Creek and cut the telegraph line between Savannah and Cockspur Island. Two infantry companies entrenched nearby to ward off Confederate raiding activity and a gunboat was detailed to patrol the channel and support the infantry. By late February 1862, no supplies or reinforcements could get in; the Confederate garrison could not get out. The last link of communications was a weekly swamp swimming courier.

At the end of February Tattnall laid plans for an amphibious assault on the two advanced batteries at Venus Point and Oakley Island. Lee personally interceded. Preparations at Old Fort Jackson were not completed. Although Tattnall's flagship had been put back into service since the Squadron's January resupply sortie, one of the three gunboats was still seriously disabled. Lee reasoned that if Tattnall's plan failed, the city itself would be open to attack. The three-to-seven exchange had not gone well for the defenders of Savannah. A possible two-to-seven match against ships with superior armament did not promise better. No further consideration was given to relief of the fort; in any case, it had perhaps sixteen weeks of provisions left in store. Meanwhile, Federal emplacements continued to improve on Jones and Bird islands, Venus Point and other points along the river. During the Federal bombardment of Fort Pulaski, April 10–11, "Old Savannah" participated in counter-battery fire with besieging Union guns.

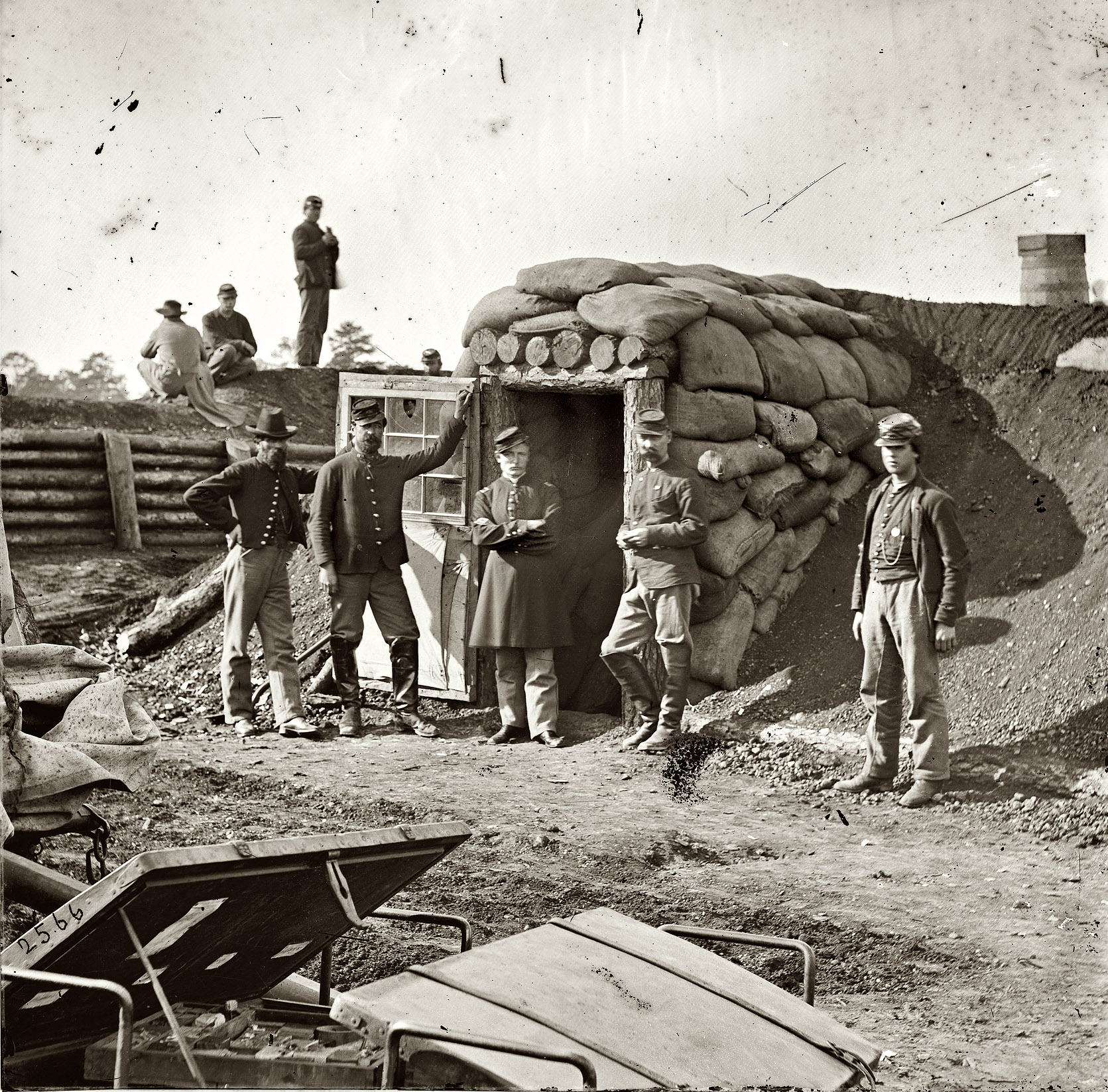
Union bombproof construction like those built on Tybee Island

Heavy caliber rifled cannon which the Federals needed to reduce Pulaski had arrived nearby in February, at which time Gillmore decided to locate the batteries at the northwestern tip of Tybee Island nearest the fort. By March, Gillmore was offloading siege materiel onto Tybee Island. Roads had to be laid down, gun emplacements excavated, magazines and bomb-proofs constructed. As the work progressed southwesterly nearing the fort, in the last mile the Union troops came under fire from the fort's gunners. A ranging shot said to be aimed by Colonel Olmstead himself cut a Union soldier in two. The following bombardment from elevated fort guns effected mortar barrages that forced all construction to proceed on Tybee Island by night. Each morning the uncompleted elements of siege construction were camouflaged against the fort's spotters.

To land the cannon onto Tybee Island, artillery pieces were taken off transports, set on rafts at high tide, and pitched into the surf near shore. At low tide, manpower alone would drag the guns up the beach. Two hundred and fifty men were required to move a 13-inch mortar along on a sling cart. Later Union amphibious operations would employ "contraband" (escaped slave) labor for much of this work. Along the two-and-a-half mile front, their engineers had to construct almost a mile of corduroy road made of bundles of brushwood to keep the guns from sinking into the swamp. While offloading proceeded day and night according to the tides, Confederate bombardment from Fort Pulaski gunners required all Federal movement into the island limited to night time. After a month of work, 36 mortars, heavy guns and rifled cannon were in position.

One of the two 13-inch mortars of Battery Halleck at 2,400 yards (2,200 m) range was given the task of signaling the opening of the bombardment. The battery would proceed by shelling the arches of the north and northeast faces with plunging fire, "exploding after striking, not before".

The four batteries closest to the fort were each given specific firing missions. Battery McClellan at a range of 1,650 yards (1,510 m) with two 84-pounder and two 64-pounder James rifled cannon (old 42- and 32-pounders, rifled), was to breach the pancoupé (Note: A pancoupè is a blunted point of a multi-faced fortification.) between the south and southeast faces and the adjacent embrasure. Battery Sigel at 1,670 yards (1,530 m) included the five 30-pounder Parrotts and a 48-pounder James rifled cannon (formerly a 24-pounder smoothbore). Their mission was to fire on the barbette guns until silenced, then switch to percussion shells onto the southeast walls and adjacent embrasure, at a rate of 10–12 rounds an hour to effect wall penetrations for the planned infantry assaults to come later. Battery Totten at a range of 1,650 yards (1,510 m) with four 10-inch siege mortars was assigned to explode shells over the northeast and southeast walls, or at any hidden batteries outside the fort. Battery Scott at 1,740 yards (1,590 m) with its three 10-inch and one 8-inch columbiads was to fire solid shot and breach the same area as Battery McClellan.

Fire was to cease at dark, except for special directions, and in the event, intermittent harassment was sustained on the fort overnight. A signal officer was stationed at Battery Scott to communicate the ranging of the mortar batteries Stanton, Grant and Sherman.

=== Bombardment ===
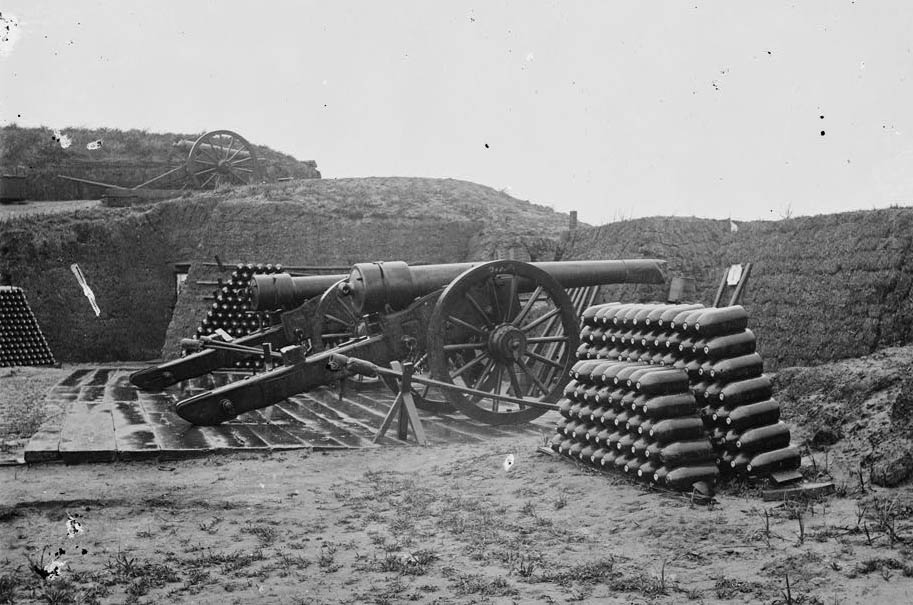
Union battery of two 30-pounder Parrott rifles and ammunition. Five Parrotts massed fire of percussion shells on the fort.

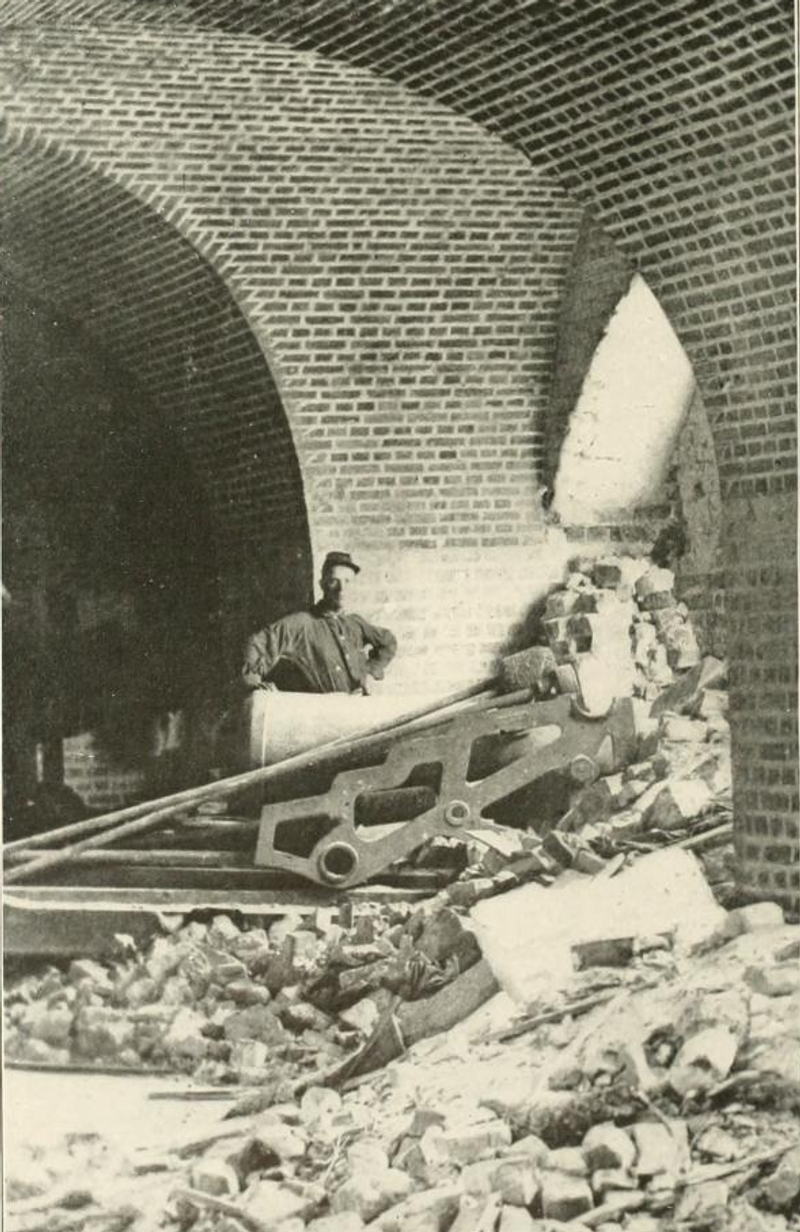
Fort casemate guns were disabled and reactivated.

Federal siege batteries at Fort Pulaski

	Armament	Range to Fort Pulaski
Battery Totten	4 10-inch siege mortars	1,650 yd (1,510 m)
Battery McClellan	2 42-pounders rifled (84-pounder James rifles) 2 32-pounders rifled (64-pounder James rifles)	1,650 yd (1,510 m)
Battery Sigel	5 4.2-inch (30-pounder) Parrott rifles 1 24-pounder rifled (48-pounder James rifle)	1,670 yd (1,530 m)
Battery Scott	3 10-inch and 1 8-inch columbiads	1,740 yd (1,590 m)
Battery Halleck	2 seacoast 13-inch mortars	2,400 yd (2,200 m)
Battery Sherman	3 seacoast 13-inch mortars	2,650 yd (2,420 m)
Battery Burnside	1 seacoast 13-inch mortar	2,750 yd (2,510 m)
Battery Lincoln	3 heavy 8-inch columbiads	3,045 yd (2,784 m)
Battery Lyon	3 heavy 10-inch columbiads	3,100 yd (2,800 m)
Battery Grant	3 seacoast 13-inch mortars	3,200 yd (2,900 m)
Battery Stanton	3 seacoast 13-inch mortars	3,400 yd (3,100 m)

Rain squalls on the ninth prevented action, but all was ready for the Federals by April 10, and the newly appointed Commander of the department, Major-General David Hunter, sent a demand for "immediate surrender and restoration of Fort Pulaski to the authority and possession of the United States." Colonel Olmstead replied, "I am here to defend the fort, not to surrender it." The bombardment began at 8:00 a.m., concentrating on the fort's southeast corner which suffered greatly. The Confederate gunnery was described by the Federal commander as "efficient and accurate firing ... great precision, not only at our batteries, but even at the individual persons passing between them."

As the day wore on, counter-battery fire from Fort Pulaski was gradually silenced as their guns were either dismounted or rendered unserviceable. Two of the Federal 10-inch columbiads jumped backwards off their carriages. The 13-inch mortars placed less than 10% rounds on target. However, Federal fire proved effective from Parrott and James rifles, and working columbiad guns. There ensued a lull from the fort, but the Confederate gunners re-opened an energetic counter battery duel that required the Parrotts to give up their wall assignment and concentrate on the working Confederate guns until they were re-silenced. By nightfall the wall at the southeast corner had been breached. Under periodic harassing bombardment throughout the hours of darkness, Olmstead's garrison put several guns back into service.

Overnight, Du Pont's flagship USS Wabash detached 100 crew to man four of the 30-pounder Parrott rifles. In the morning, with the wind picking up right to left and affecting shell trajectory, the Union artillery resumed the bombardment, concentrating fire to enlarge the opening. The Georgia gunners again found targets, described in dispatches as Rebel "firing ... good all the morning, doing some damage". At the same time, the Parrott rifles and Columbiads opened a great gap in the wall, sending shot across the interior of the fort and against the northwest powder magazine containing twenty tons of powder. Regarding his situation as hopeless, Olmstead surrendered the fort at 2:30 p.m. that day.

Gillmore reported in his after-action assessment of the siege by his artillery, "Good rifled guns, properly served can breach rapidly" at 1600–2000 yards when they are followed by heavy round shot to knock down loosened masonry. The 84-pounder James is unexcelled in breaching, but its grooves must be kept clean. The 13-inch mortars had little effect. The new 30-pounder Parrott rifle had made a major impact on the battle. The rifled cannon fired significantly further with more accuracy and greater destructive impact than the smoothbores then in use. Its application achieved tactical surprise unanticipated by senior commanders of either side.

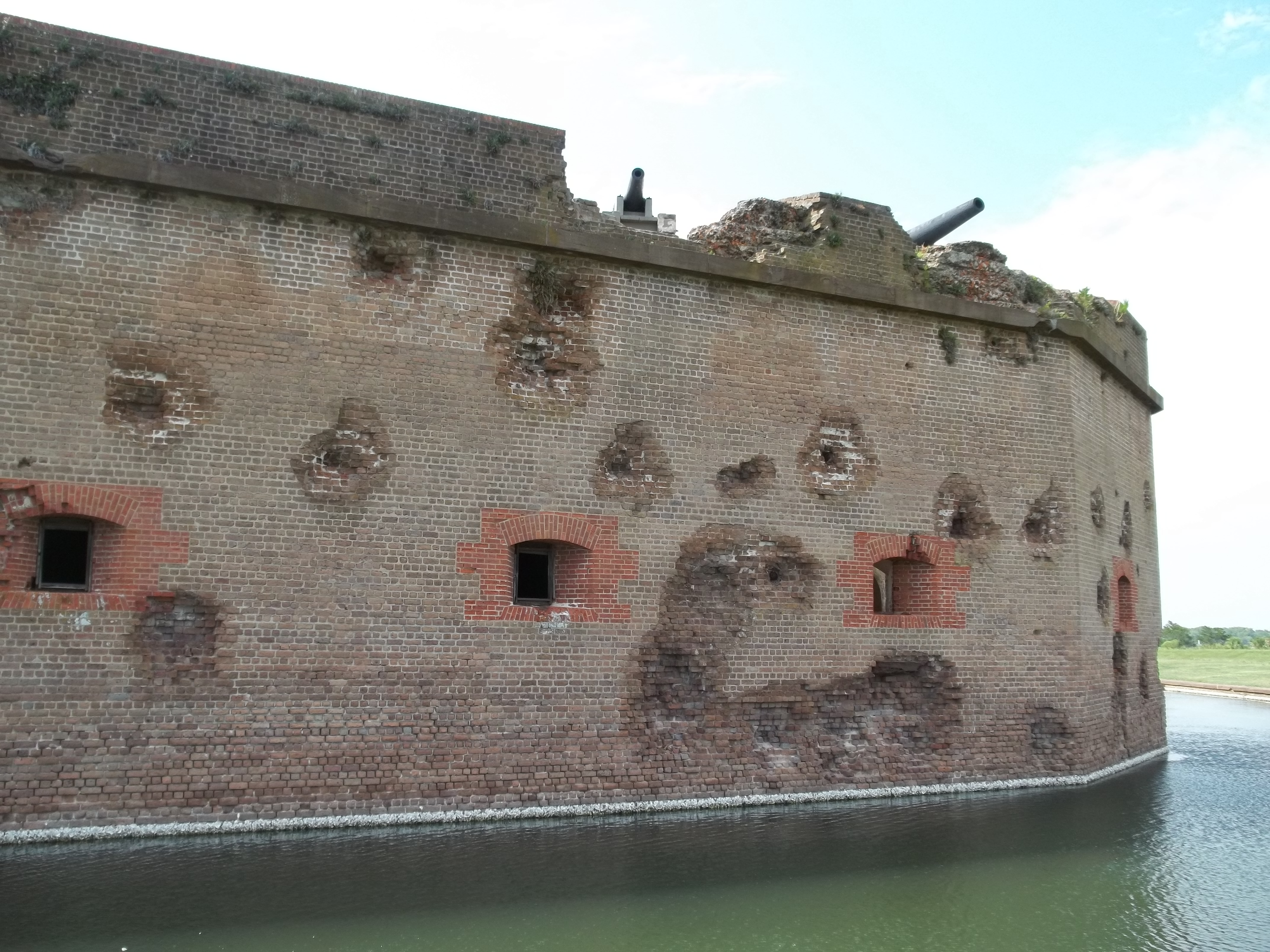
Heavy sustained damage scars of Union siege artillery at Fort Pulaski

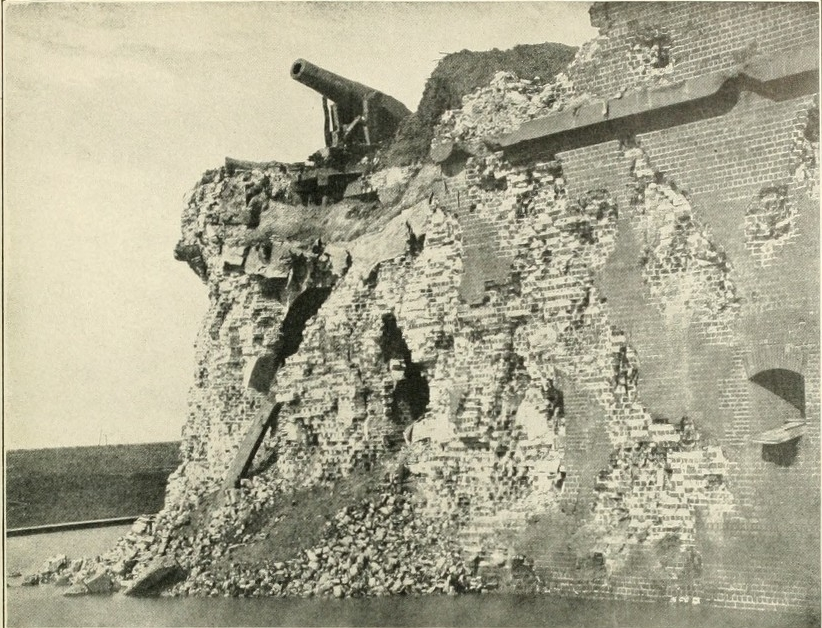
Closeup of damage inflicted on Fort Pulaski by Union artillery on Big Tybee Island, April 12–14, 1862

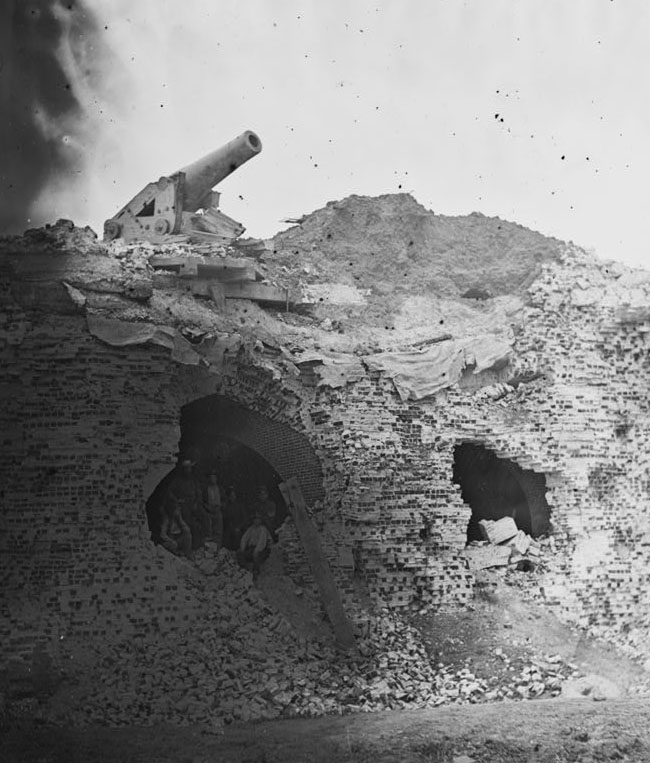
Photograph of the breach at Fort Pulaski

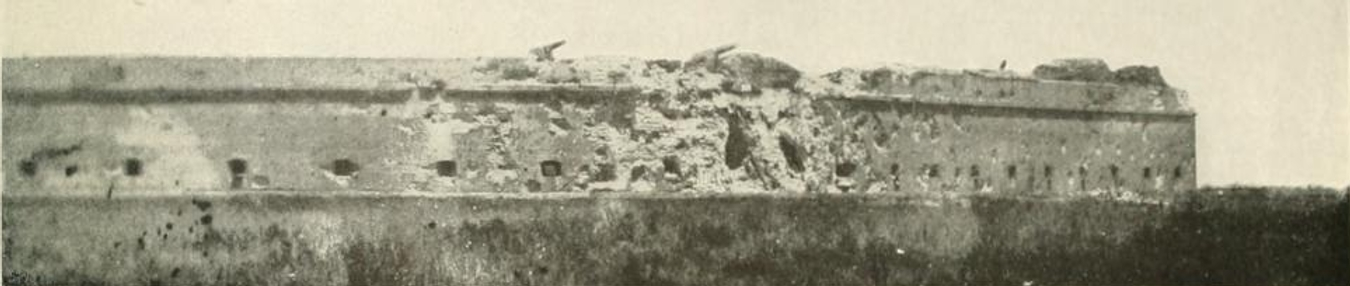
Heavy rifled batteries penetrated the fort's walls in three places at the southeast corner (center), while smoothbore guns merely shook walls "in a random manner" (right).

== Aftermath ==
=== Military fallout ===
- Union: The port of Savannah was closed to the Confederacy early, extending the Union blockade. Damage to the fort was repaired in six weeks, and the Confederates made no attempt to retake it. The city of Savannah itself remained in Confederate hands until the arrival of William Tecumseh Sherman in December 1864, when he marched to the sea. Postwar, it was determined that heavy rifled cannon made masonry fortifications obsolete, revolutionizing coastal defense as much as the Battle of the USS Monitor and CAA Virginia had for warships. The rapid reduction of Fort Pulaski was used to justify stopping work on masonry forts and led to a brief period of new construction of earthwork forts in the 1870s.

"Lessons learned" by the Union were not adopted until the war was over. In its December 1864 attack on Fort Fisher, the bombardment was diffuse and scattered, without any real damage to the fort made by the many shots aimed at the fort's flagpole. Admiral Porter adopted Gillmore's gunnery tactics for the second attack, assigning targets until they were destroyed. The January 1865 bombardment dismounted 73 of the fort's 75 guns and mostly shot away the fort's palisade.

- Confederate: Tattnall's efforts to break the Union blockade at Savannah extended the modern era armored warships with ironclads CSS Atlanta (1862) and CSS Savannah (1863). To elaborate Savannah's defenses, a torpedo station was established under military command. The ironclad USS Montauk survived the detonation of a torpedo while attacking Fort McAllister in 1863. Given shortages in marine engines, the Confederate Navy built the floating battery CSS Georgia (1863). Closure of gaps and connections between railways in Savannah, Augusta, and Charleston allowed timely movement of troops and supplies to besieged Charleston from late 1862 through 1864.

"Lessons learned" by the Confederates were immediately incorporated into the defenses of Charleston, SC. On his release as a prisoner-of-war, Colonel Olmstead was assigned engineer and gunnery duty there. Repeated Union naval and amphibious assaults between 1862 and 1865 failed. Both Union gunboats and ironclads repeatedly suffered substantial damage and loss by Confederate gunnery and mines.
