= Blakely rifle =

One of a series of rifled muzzle-loading cannon

Blakely rifle or Blakely gun is a series of rifled muzzle-loading cannon designed by British army officer Captain Theophilus Alexander Blakely in the 1850s and 1860s. Blakely was a pioneer in the banding and rifling of cannon but the British army declined to use Blakely's design. The guns were mostly sold to Russia and the Confederacy during the American Civil War. Blakely rifles were imported by the Confederacy in larger numbers than other Imported English cannon. The State of Massachusetts bought eight 9 in (23 cm) and four 11 in (28 cm) models. (Note: Ripley, 1970, p. 155 wrote: "The 9-inch fired a 248-pound bolt with a charge of 30 pounds and the 11-inch burned 37.25 pounds with a 375-pound projectile.")

Blakely rifles had innovative design features using two layer construction and layers of rings which allowed rifling of larger cannons. Blakely's manufacturing innovations allowed larger guns of lighter weight and greater resistance to explosion. The Confederacy used the Blakely rifles in seacoast fortifications, fortifications at Vicksburg, as naval guns and, in the smaller sizes, as artillery in land battles.

== Development and production ==
The Blakely rifled artillery gun was designed with a cast-iron core and included wrought-iron or steel banding to reinforce the breech. (Note: Blakely's patent, February 27, 1855, described Blakely's ordnance improvement as: "a method of forming guns with an internal tube or cylinder of cast iron or steel, enclosed in a casing of wrought iron or steel. I sometimes form the outer surface of the inner tube somewhat conical, the greatest diameter being just in front of the trunnions, and tapering both ways, and apply the outer casing in the form of collars or rings driven thereon. And in some cases I apply two or more layers of such rings, according to the strength sought to be obtained, the trunnions being of one piece with one of the rings. The other casing may, however, be applied in the form of collars or rings, heated and shrunk upon the cylindrical surface of the inner cylinder or tube...." Hazlett, 2004, p. 196.) Blakely himself noted that the cannon was to be built up tube after tube, compressing the inner tubes and extending the outer tubes by a certain calculation. This was to be done to prevent the inside breaking before sufficient strain was sent to the outside as would be the case with any thick tubes made in one piece. Blakely wrote that, "paradoxically," by using this method of two layer construction, a thick tube would be strengthened by diminishing its thickness and would weigh half as much. Blakely wrote that he had shown that no rifled cannon of considerable size had succeeded when made in one mass. (Note: A detailed discussion of the Blakely rifle can be found at the public domain source, Holley, 1865, pp. 36, cited in full in references.)

Blakely was a pioneer in this two tube, or two layer, design. Nonetheless, the British government rejected his designs. The contemporaneous Armstrong guns of Sir William George Armstrong were of similar design, but unlike Blakely, Armstrong had his own foundry at the time. Because Blakely believed that Armstrong had infringed his patents, he stopped offering his designs to the British military when Armstrong became superintendent of the Royal Arsenal at Woolwich.

Blakely contracted with companies including Fawcett, Preston, & Company of Liverpool, Vavasseur of London, George Forrester and Company of Liverpool, Low Moor Iron Company, and the Blakeley Ordnance Company of London (established 1863) for the manufacture of his guns. (Note: Hazlett noted a slight difference in spelling of Blakeley Ordnance Company and does not "speculate" as to whether Blakely had an interest in the company. Olmstead, Edwin, Wayne E. Stark and Spencer C. Tucker. The Big Guns: Civil War Siege, Seacoast and Naval Cannon. Bloomfield, ONT, Alexandria Bay, NY: Museum Restoration Service, 1997. ISBN 978-0-88855-012-5, p. 136 identifies the company as founded by Blakely despite the misspelling. The Blakely Company was not incorporated until 1863. Blakely and John Dent acquired Josiah Vavasseur's company. Vavasseur became manager and engineer of Blakely's company, which lasted until 1867. Blakely Ordnance Co. in Grace's Guide To British Industrial History. . Last edited August 12, 2017, Retrieved September 22, 2023.) The cannon foundries produced about 400 guns to Blakely's design. Most were made of iron.

=== Types, variations ===
Because Blakely continued to experiment with designs, he produced five to as many as ten different designs, which were manufactured, some with variants. The Blakely rifled guns fired ammunition weighing between 10 lb (4.5 kg) and 470 lb (210 kg). At least nine varieties of 3.5-inch (12-pounder) rifles alone were produced. Rifling types included flat-sided bores or bores with grooves cut in them into which flanges on the shells would fit.

The foundries that manufactured Blakely rifles produced them in 2.5-inch (6-pounder), 2.9-inch, 3.5-inch (12-pounder), 3.75-inch (16-pounder), 4-inch (18-pounder), 4.5-inch (20-pounder), 6.4-inch (100-pounder), 7-inch (120-pounder), 7.5-inch (150-pounder), 8-inch (200-pounder), 9-inch (250-pounder), 11-inch, and 12.75-inch (450-pounder shells or 650-pounder solid shot) bores. All of the caliber rifles did not come to the United States.

== Confederate use ==
Confederate forces used various sizes of Blakely rifles in several ways during the American Civil War.

=== First use against Fort Sumter ===
Blakely was more successful in selling cannons to the Confederacy than to the British military or the Union. One of the first guns sold was a 12-pounder Blakely delivered to the Confederates for use against Fort Sumter at the beginning of the American Civil War. (Note: "The following are particulars of the first gun sent by Captain Blakely to the Confederates, obtained from a drawing dated May 15, 1860. The gun, made by Fawcett, Preston & Co., was of cast-iron, reinforced by a solid wrought-iron hoop made thin at the edges. Total length of gun 84 in. Length of bore 73.5 in. Diameter of bore 3.5 in. Diameter of cast-iron under hoop 9.1in. Maximum diameter of hoop 12.1 in. Length of hoop 22.i in. Diameter of muzzle. 6.0 in." Holley, Alexander Lyman. A treatise on Ordnance and Armor ... With an appendix, referring to gun cotton, hooped guns, etc. New York: D Van Nostrand, 192 Broadway; London: Trubner and Company, 1865. OCLC 5079161. Public domain. Holley also noted that the rifle fired 3,000 rounds during the war. Ripley, 1970, p. 149.) That gun was the first rifled cannon fired in the war. The cannon was bought by Charles K. Prioleau in London and sent to Charleston before the surrender of Fort Sumter. The gun was used from Morris Island where it accurately sent projectiles against Fort Sumter, 1,250 yards (1,193 meters) away. It was likely the gun which fired a shot scattering debris from the stone cheek of the casemate embrasure, wounding four Union soldiers.

=== In other fortifications ===
On January 3, 1862, Union gunboats shelled Confederate batteries blockading traffic on the Potomac River in the inconclusive Battle of Cockpit Point also known as the Battle of Shipping Point, in Prince William County, Virginia. The Confederates retained the batteries. On March 9, 1862, Union gunboats again approached the Confederate defenses and discovered them abandoned. They captured two guns rifled in the Blakely method that ended up in the Washington Navy Yard. Historian Warren Ripley wrote that he did not think these are 6.3 in (16 cm) and 6.97 in (17.7 cm) Blakelys, but British 32-pounder and 42-pounder smoothbores reworked in the Blakely rifling fashion.

Two Blakely "siege" rifles were used in the Confederate defense of Fort Pulaski in 1862. The Confederate commander of Fort Pulaski near the coast outside of Savannah, Georgia during the Siege of Fort Pulaski, Colonel Charles H. Olmstead, used two 4.5 in (11 cm) Blakely rifles in his ultimately unsuccessful defense which ended with the fort's surrender on April 11, 1862 after a 112-day siege. These rifles were taken to West Point as old trophies numbers 152 and 153 but returned to Fort Pulaski National Monument in the 1930s.

"The Widow Blakely" was a 7.5 in (19 cm) rifle that the Confederates used during their 1863 defense of Vicksburg, Mississippi. On May 22, 1863, a shell exploded in the gun's barrel while the Widow Blakely was firing at a Union gunboat. The explosion only took off part of the end of the muzzle. The Confederates cut away part of the barrel and continued to use the rifle as a mortar until Vicksburg fell to the Union Army under the command of Major General Ulysses S. Grant. (Note: "The Widow Blakely": 7.5-inch Blakely Rifle at Civil War Artillery Retrieved September 2, 2023 relates the muzzle explosion, the cutting down of the barrel from 124 inches to about 100 inches, gives a link to "Actual reports from the Official Records listing 'The Widow Blakely'", and has additional photos of the gun.) A gun at West Point which was misidentified as Whistling Dick was returned to the Vicksburg National Battlefield Park when it was identified by historian Ed Bearss as "Widow Blakely."

Two 12.75 in (32.4 cm) Blakelys, the largest guns in the Confederate arsenal, were mounted in 1863 at Charleston, South Carolina. These were delivered, along with shot, to Wilmington, North Carolina in August 1863 from Liverpool by the blockade runner Gibraltar. These were ordered to the defense of Charleston, South Carolina harbor by Confederate General P. G. T. Beauregard and Confederate Secretary of War James A. Seddon. The rifles had 7 in (18 cm) inside diameter by 30 in (76 cm) long bronze air chamber behind the seat of its charge. General Roswell S. Ripley improperly loaded the chamber of one of the guns with powder to reduce the size of cartridge bags. This cracked the chamber and caused other damage on the first fire and it had to be replaced. The rifle had a 12.75 in (32.4 cm) flanged shot and shell with four grooves and a right-hand twist for rifling. The rifles were never fired against Union forces or ships. They were loaded with excessive charges and blown up when Charleston was evacuated on February 18, 1865. Pieces of the rifles survive at West Point and Charleston, South Carolina.

Principal characteristics of Blakely rifled 12.75 in (32.4 cm) seacoast guns were: Total length of gun: 194 in (490 cm); bore: 12.75 in (32.4 cm); diameter of air chamber: 6.5 in (17 cm); length of bore to bronze chamber: 151.5 in (385 cm); total length of bore to bottom of chamber: 184 in (470 cm); maximum diameter of cast iron: 44 in (110 cm); diameter of cast iron muzzle: 24 in (61 cm); diameter over steel hoop: 51 in (130 cm); weight: 27 tons.

An 8.12 in (20.6 cm) rifled British 68-pounder cannon of 95 hundredweight was captured by Union Army forces at Fort Morgan, Alabama on August 23, 1864. The cannon was originally a smoothbore manufactured by Low Moor Iron Company in 1862. It was banded and rifled with three grooves of right-hand twists in the manner of a Blakely. Olmstead describes the piece as "Identified As A 'Blakely'", casting doubt as to its identity and noting that it is covered in black enamel, obscuring any markings. This cannon is in the Washington Navy Yard. The Official Records of the Union and Confederate Armies list two 8-inch Blakelys as in the Confederate defenses at Fort Morgan.

Four Blakely 9 in (23 cm) seacoast rifles and four smoothbores were taken from Liverpool, England in August 1871 by the USS Worcester and off loaded at Boston Navy Yard. These were manufactured for use on Confederate cruisers. The 9 in (23 cm) rifled cannon number 95 is on private property at Bernhards Bay, New York on Oneida Lake.

=== In other land battles ===
A Confederate horse artillery battery, suggested by Colonel Turner Ashby, was organized November 11, 1861. R. Preston Chew's battery, the initial battery of the unit, was originally called Ashby's Horse Artillery. The battery was engaged in Stonewall Jackson's Shenandoah Valley Campaign (1862). (Note: Ashby's Horse Artillery was combined with Stuart's Horse Artillery before the Gettysburg campaign. Before the death of Stonewall Jackson at the Battle of Chancellorsville preceding the Gettysburg campaign, Stuarts Horse Artillery was Captain John Pelham's battery. Wise, 1915, p. 186.) According to historian Jennings C. Wise, the armament of the battery "from first to last consisted of 3 pieces; a Blakely imported British rifled piece, which fired a percussion shell; a smooth-bore 12-pounder howitzer; and a 3-inch iron rifle."

Four surviving 3.5-inch Blakely's have been placed at Shiloh National Military Park.

A July 3, 1862 letter from Frank M. Coker of the Sumter Flying Artillery to his wife mentions that during the Seven Days Battles he was ordered to carry a large Blakely rifled gun down the line.

The Confederate Army of Northern Virginia had a variety of artillery pieces at the Battle of Antietam. Many Confederate pieces were inferior models compared to most of those used by the Union Army of the Potomac. Blakely rifles were among the better rifled models used by the Confederates at that battle. Confederate batteries performed well despite being hampered by the frequent deployment of four different cannon in a battery. John B. Brockenbrough's battery, which was heavily engaged in the battle north and west of the Dunker Church, had four different cannon, including a Blakely rifle.

Chew's Battery fought at the Battle of Fairfield, one of the cavalry battles on July 3, 1863, the third day of the Battle of Gettysburg. Blakely rifles, as the most commonly imported British artillery guns, continued in service through the war. Chew's Battery served through the rest of the war concluding with the Appomattox campaign.

An example of an 18-pounder, 4-inch caliber based on bore dimension was captured in the Union attack on Confederates salvaging the blockade runner Hebe near Fort Fisher, North Carolina on August 23, 1863 has been placed in the Washington Navy Yard. Ripley wrote that this should be catalogued as in field service due to its known employment.

The U.S. National Park Service has noted that Blakely rifled cannon were used at several battles of the American Civil War in the Shenandoah Valley (Jackson's Valley campaign; Valley campaigns of 1864). (Note: "Blakely Rifled Gun (12-pound). A Confederate import from England, the 12-pounder Blakely Rifled Gun found its way into several battles in the Shenandoah Valley. Most Blakely rifles were muzzleloaders that featured steel or cast-iron barrels with wrought iron bands to reinforce the rear of the barrel near the breech. The Blakely was most effective firing shot and shell projectiles, not so effective with canister. Length: Barrel 4.9 feet. Weight: 2,000 lbs. (800 lbs.). Caliber: 3.5 inch (12-pounder). Effective Range: 1,850 yds. (1.1 miles). Friction Primer and lanyard action. Horse drawn, wooden carriage. Seven or eight-man crew, fired 2-3 rounds per minute. Deployed in batteries of four, or mixed with other gun types. Many variations: 6-pound, 12-pound, 20-pound, 100-pound, 150-pound, etc." United States National Park Service. Civil War Weapons in the Shenandoah Valley Last updated: May 25, 2023. Retrieved September 2, 2023. Attribution: Public domain. U.S. Government publication.)

=== At Sea ===
Blakely rifles were used by the Confederate ship SS Georgiana, which was run aground and scuttled on the night of March 19, 1863, while attempting to run past the Union Blockade and into port at Charleston, South Carolina on its first voyage. Two 2.9-inch iron Blakely rifles were recovered from the wreck in 1974. (Note: Recovered projectiles from the Georgiana were 2.890 in diameter, which helped identify the gun as a 2.9-inch Blakely Rifle, Type 11. The salvors noted that the markings on one or both trunnions of the gun when it was recovered were "VAVASSEUR 1862 LONDON." The marking on the top of the reinforcement band was: BLAKELY'S PATENT." Hazlett, 2004, p. 197.)

The commerce raider CSS Alabama carried a 100-pounder Blakely rifled gun in the forecastle. The wreck of the Alabama, which was sunk by the USS Kearsarge on June 19, 1864, off Cherbourg, France was found in 1984 and the 3.5-ton Blakely rifle that was the Alabama's forward pivot gun was recovered from the wreck. Surviving 7-inch Navy rifles are at the Washington Navy Yard and at Cannes, France. Historian Warren Ripley noted that if the shell from Alabama's Blakely rifle which lodged in the Kearsarge's rudder post had exploded, the outcome of the battle might have been different.

The CSS Florida (cruiser) also carried two 7-inch and four 6-inch Blakely guns. A 7-inch Blakely rifle displayed as a trophy at Washington Navy Yard was taken from the "Anglo-Rebel Pirate Florida".

=== Union rejection of a Blakely ===
In 1863, the U.S. government rejected a 7-inch Blakely smoothbore with obvious manufacturing defects and non-conformity with specifications. Also, the piece was marked as manufactured by Blakely Ordnance Company, a known Confederate supplier not used by the Union army, contrary to representations by the agent, that it would be made by Sheffield.

== Other surviving pieces ==
Survivors of several variations of 3.5-inch (and possible or worn 3.6-inch 12-pounder) Blakely wrought iron rifles can be found at Shiloh National Military Park (4); West Point, New York, (2); Beaufort, South Carolina; Chickamauga and Chattanooga National Military Park, Tennessee unit; Gettysburg National Military Park; Warren, Pennsylvania; Rock Island Arsenal, Illinois; Charleston, South Carolina; (Note: Ripley, 1970, p. 153 wrote that rust has corroded the bore and the apparent 3.75-inch diameter was probably originally closer to 3.5-inch. At page 154, Ripley states that it is more likely to be a Confederate-made piece with the marking acknowledging the Blakely patent or even a direction to use Blakely ammunition.) Greenwood, Mississippi (Fort Pemberton Memorial Park); Wortham, Texas; and Winona, Minnesota. A survivor was stolen from Rivers Bridge State Historic Site near Barnwell, South Carolina on February 2, 1995. The only known survivor of a 3.75-inch Blakely wrought iron rifle can be found at Grant Park in Galena, Illinois.

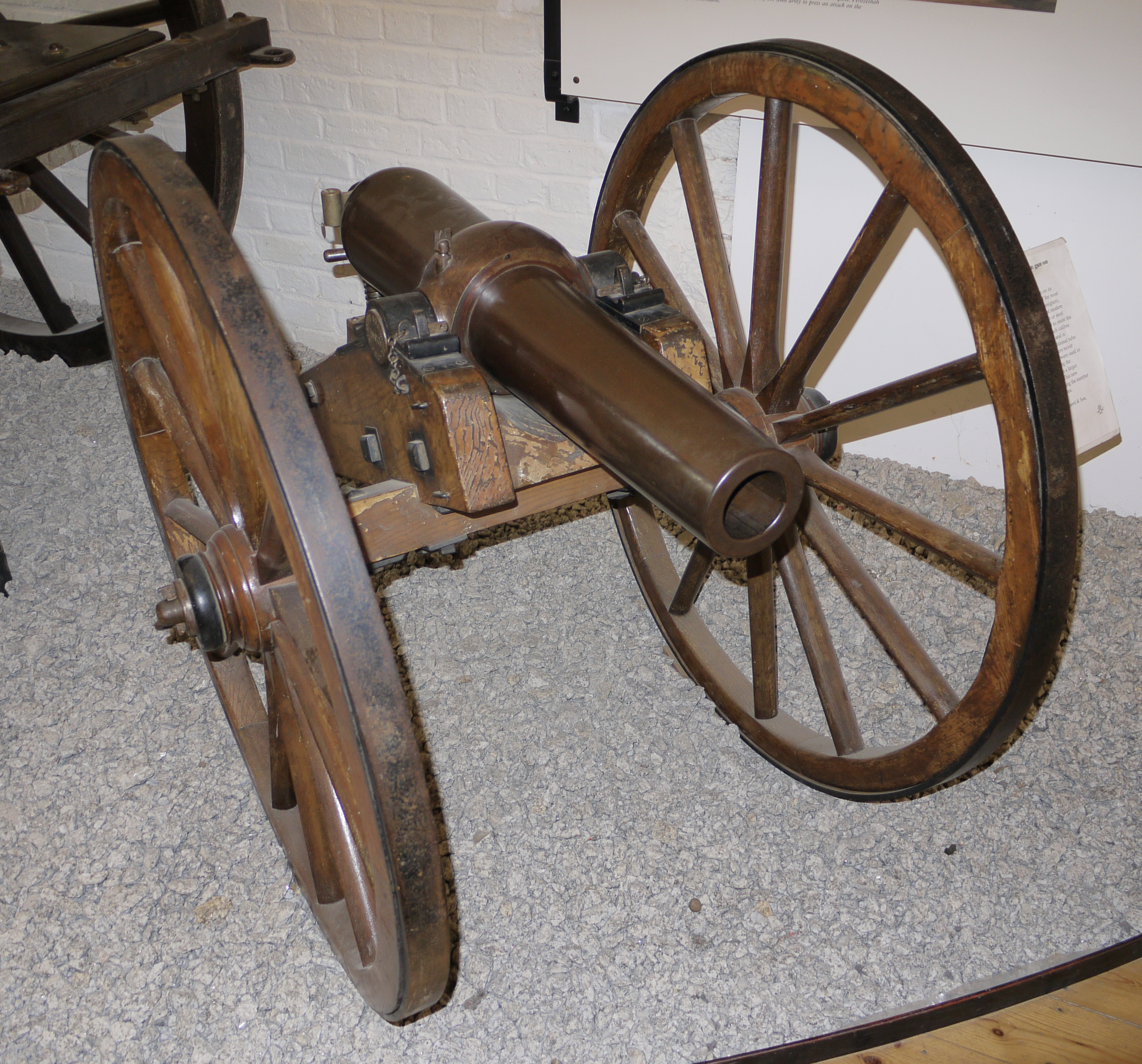
A 2.75 inch mountain Blakely rifle.

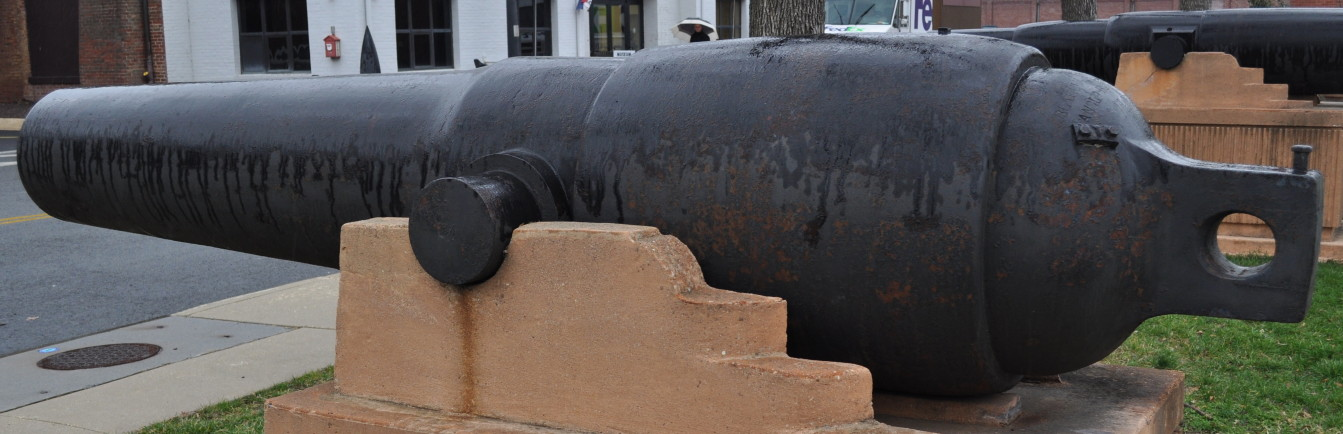
100-pounder (7-inch) Blakely rifle at the Washington Navy Yard, District of Columbia.

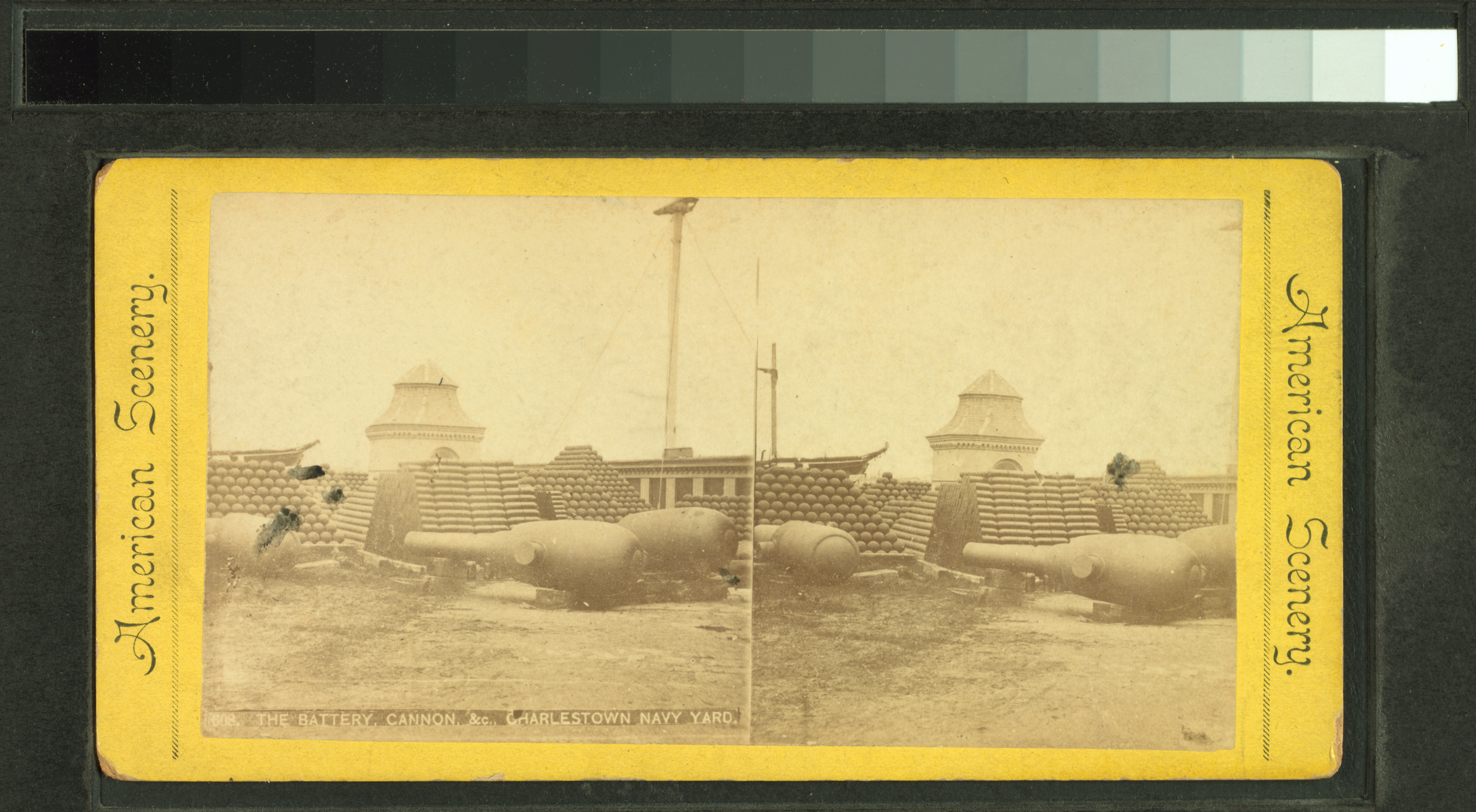
Stereoscopic view of 9-inch Blakely rifles, Charlestown Navy Yard, Boston, Massachusetts.

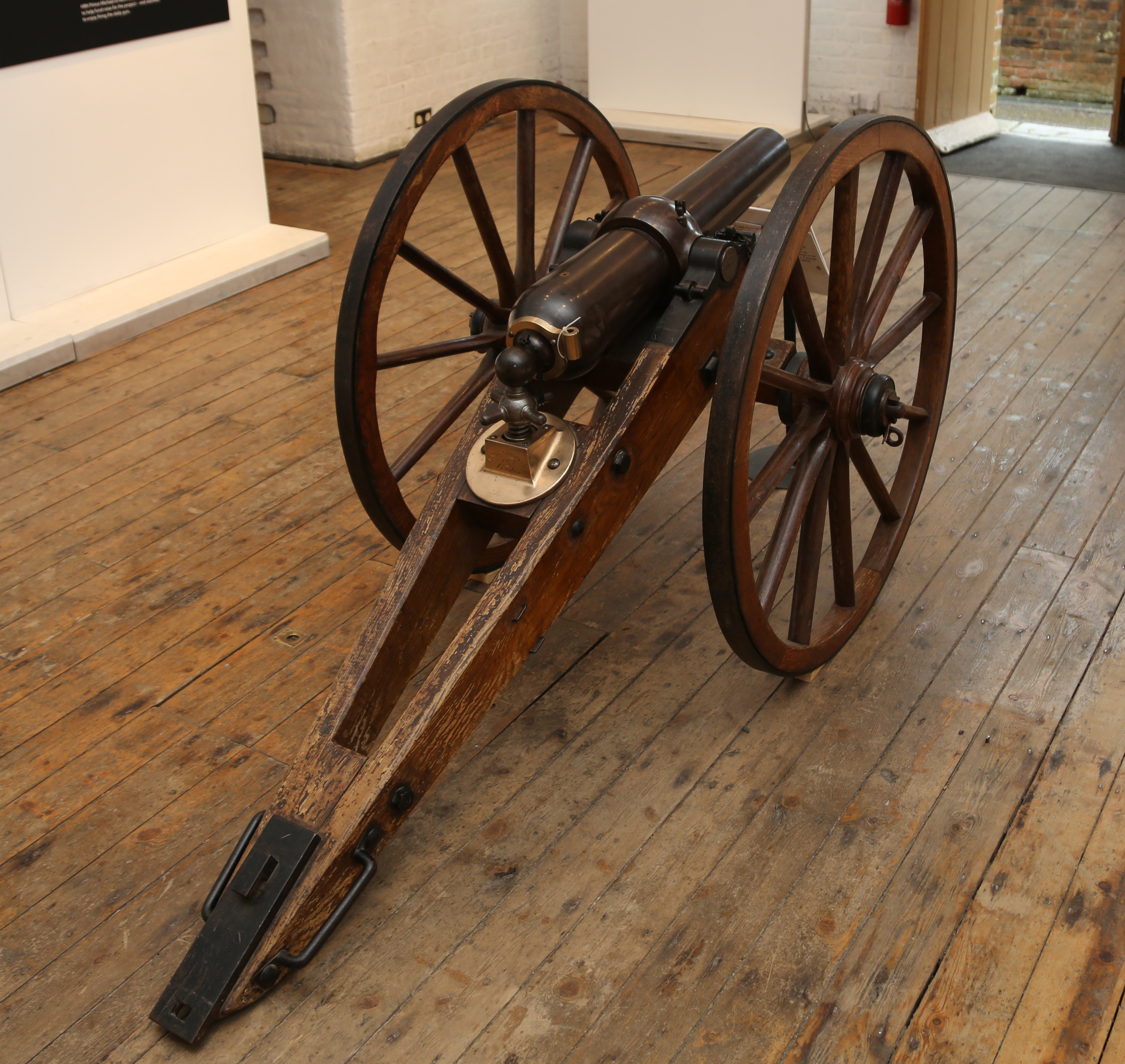
A 2.75 inch mountain Blakely rifle viewed from the rear.

== See also ==
- Field artillery in the American Civil War
