= CSS Georgia (1863) =

American Civil War Confederate ironclad warship

Coordinates: 32°5′5″N 81°2′9″W

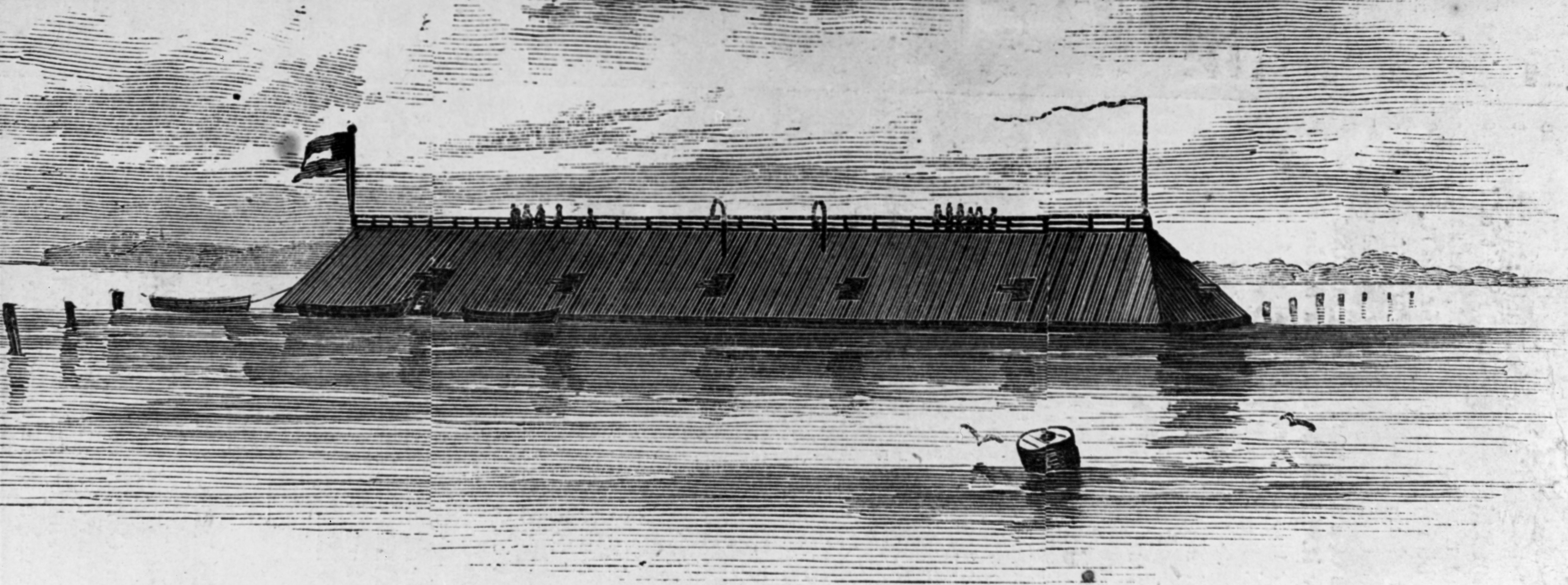

History

Confederate States of America
- Name: Georgia
- Namesake: Georgia
- Laid down: 1862
- Launched: 1863
- Commissioned: 1863
- Decommissioned: December 21, 1864
- Fate: Scuttled to prevent capture. Currently undergoing salvage.

General characteristics
- Length: 250 ft (76 m)
- Beam: 60 ft (18 m)
- Complement: 200 officers and men
- Armament: 4 to 9 heavy cannons
- CSS GEORGIA (ironclad)
- U.S. National Register of Historic Places
- Location within Georgia
- Nearest city: Savannah, Georgia
- Area: 1.6 acres (0.65 ha)
- Built: 1862
- Engineer: Alvin N. Miller
- NRHP reference No.: 86003746
- Added to NRHP: February 10, 1987

CSS Georgia, also known as State of Georgia and Ladies' Ram, was an ironclad warship built in Savannah, Georgia in 1862 during the American Civil War. The Ladies' Gunboat Association raised $115,000 for her construction to defend the port city of Savannah.

== Service history ==
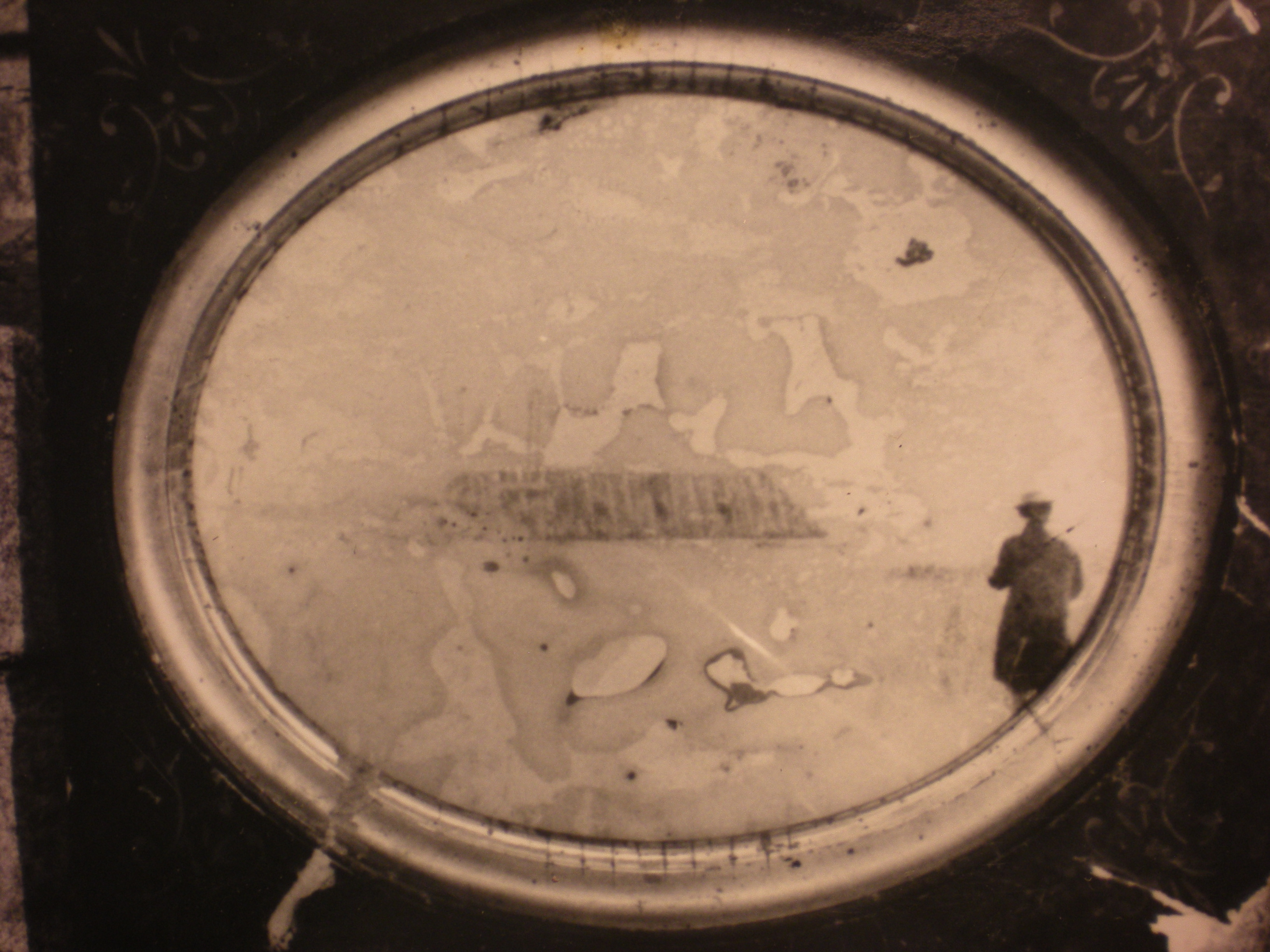
Photograph once claimed to be of CSS Georgia, later determined to be a forgery created in the 1980s.

Commanded by Lieutenant Washington Gwathmey, CSN, the new warship was employed to defend the river channels below Savannah, using her cannons to prevent a Union advance on the city from the sea. When her steam engines turned out to lack sufficient power for offensive use, Georgia was anchored in the Savannah River as a floating battery, protecting both the city and Fort Jackson. Georgia had been in service about 20 months, when Sherman's March to the Sea captured Savannah by land on December 21, 1864. Her Confederate crew scuttled the ship to prevent her capture and use against the South.

== Wreck ==
In 1866, the ship's railroad track iron rail armor was partially salvaged and the wooden hull was shattered by the underwater charges used to remove it. The wreck was then left alone and forgotten. In 1968 Georgia was rediscovered during a dredging operation of the Savannah River. The wreck was left untouched, although accidental impacts from dredging equipment and the anchors marking the site location may have damaged what remained. By 1992, all that survived were portions of her forward and aft casemates and parts of her engines, including the boilers, shafts, propellers, and condensers. Several of her cannon were located nearby, along with assorted ordnance.

In May 2012 the United States Army Corps of Engineers (USACE) budgeted $14 million to raise the remains of the ironclad to allow for further dredging. Archeologists working for the USACE Savannah District, assisted by teams from the United States Navy, raised a 64 square feet (5.9 m^{2}) section of Georgia on November 12, 2013.

Further relics are being recovered during an ongoing nine-month salvage operation in 2015, as an initiative to upgrade waterway access for deep sea vessels requires its dredging to 47 feet (14 m). As of April 2015, USACE, with archaeologists from Texas A&M University, had recovered over 1000 artifacts. The removal of ordnance and the lifting of the major remains of the casemates and machinery occurred in June–August 2015.

In the 1980s, a photograph was discovered that allegedly shows the Georgia, but it was later discovered to be fake.

Georgia was placed on the National Register of Historic Places in 1987.

=== Artifacts recovered in 2015 ===
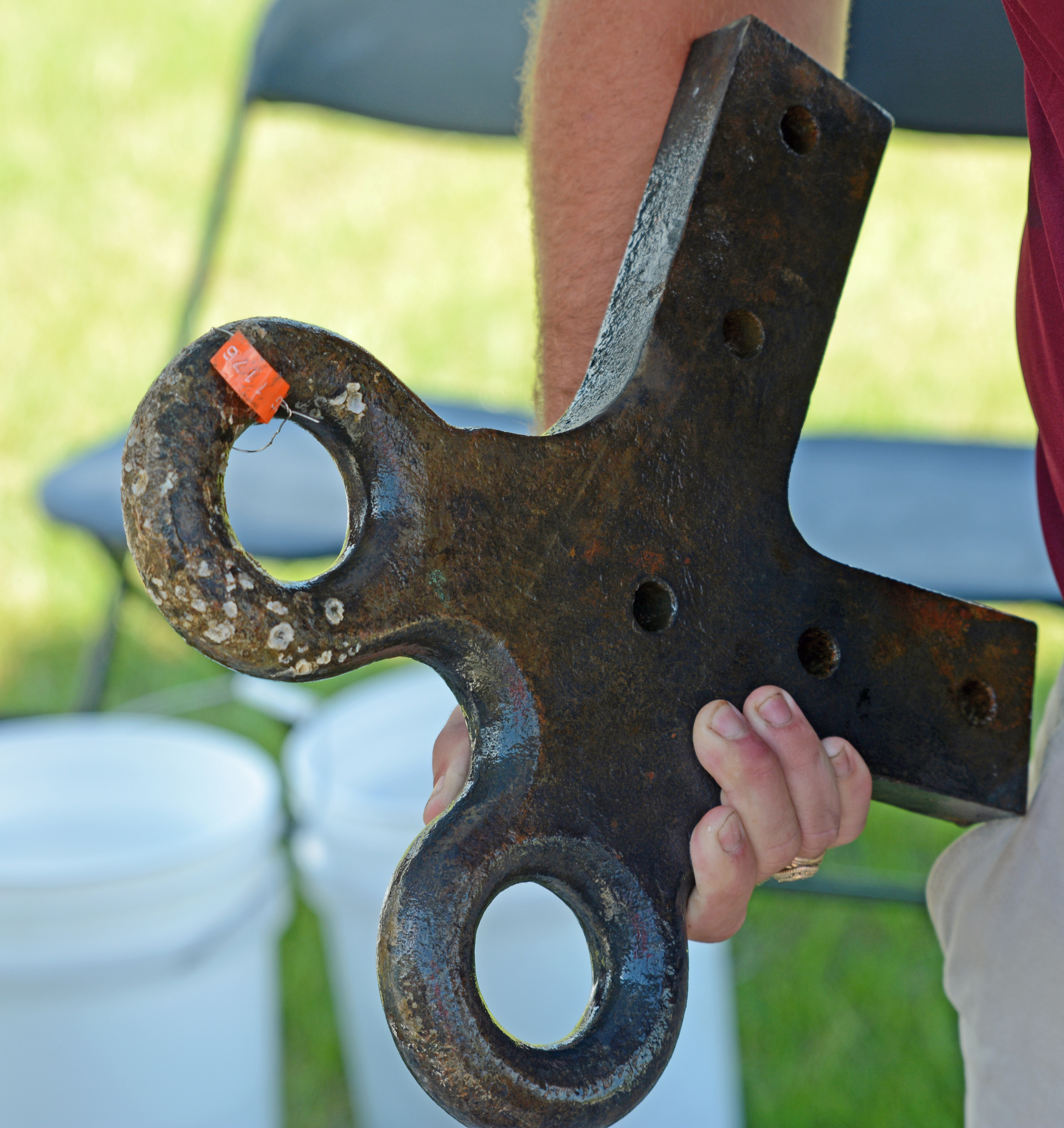
A brass artifact - part of a wood and rope assembly to move a cannon

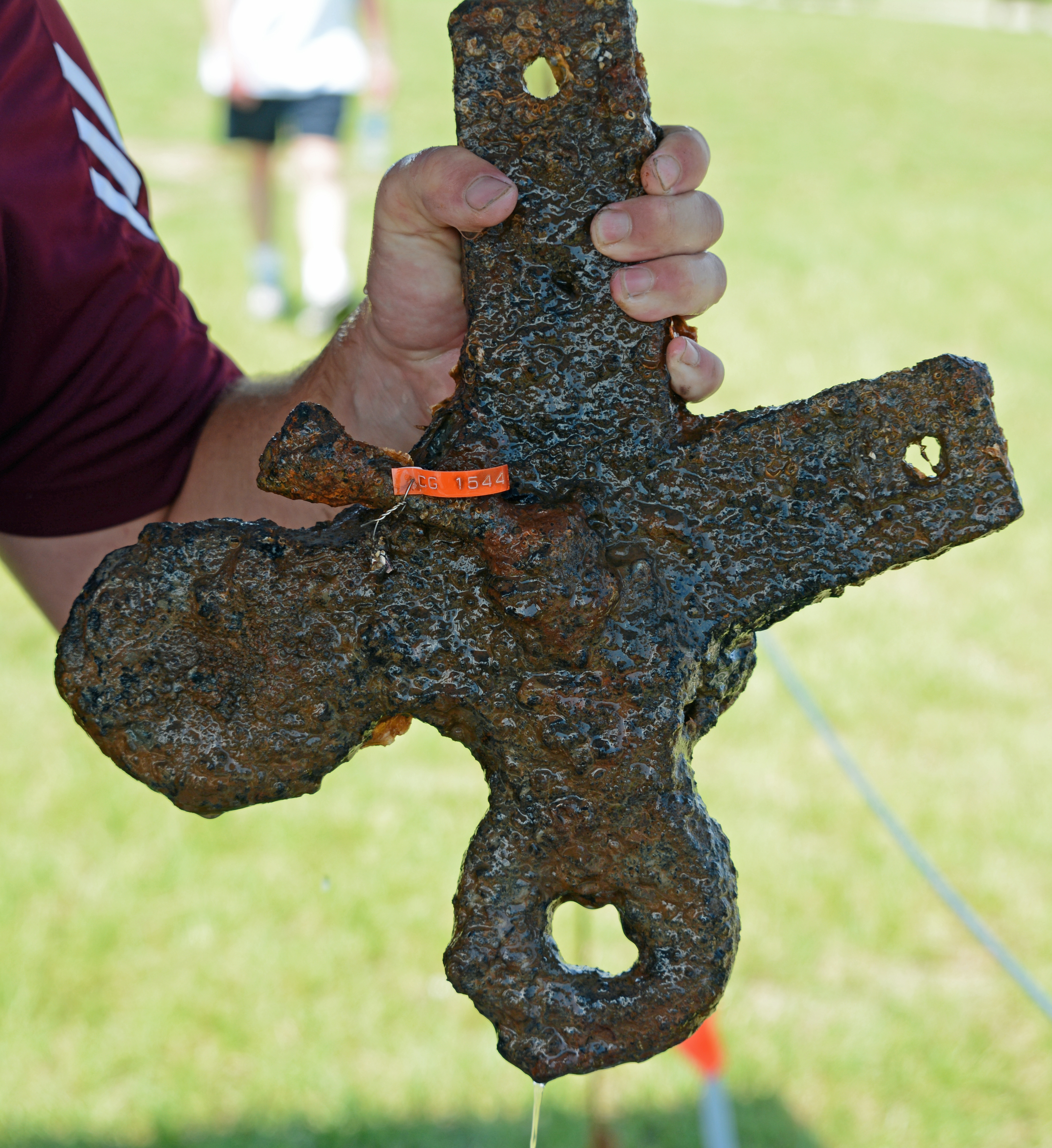
Iron artifact (heavily corroded)

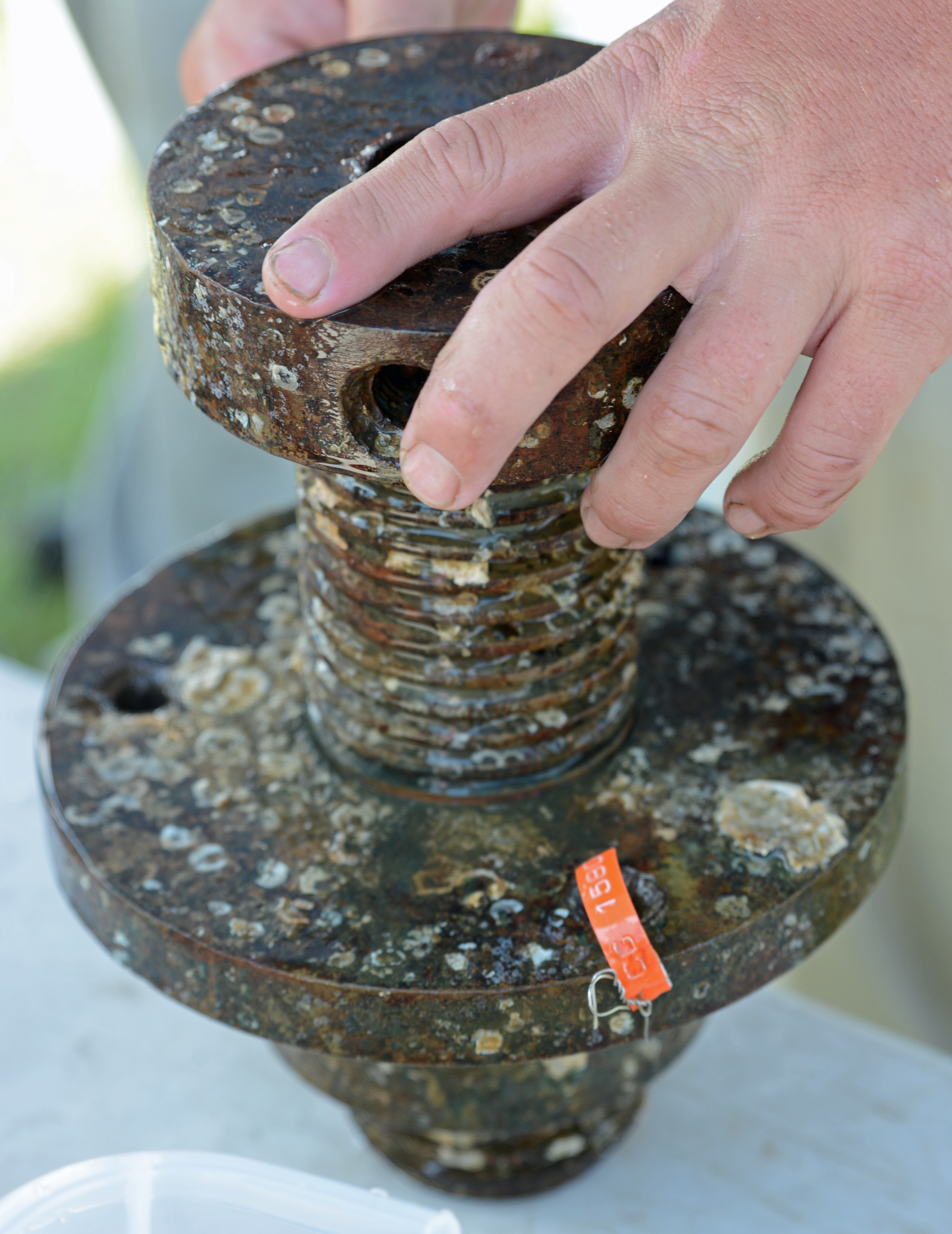
A brass cannon elevation screw (still turns)

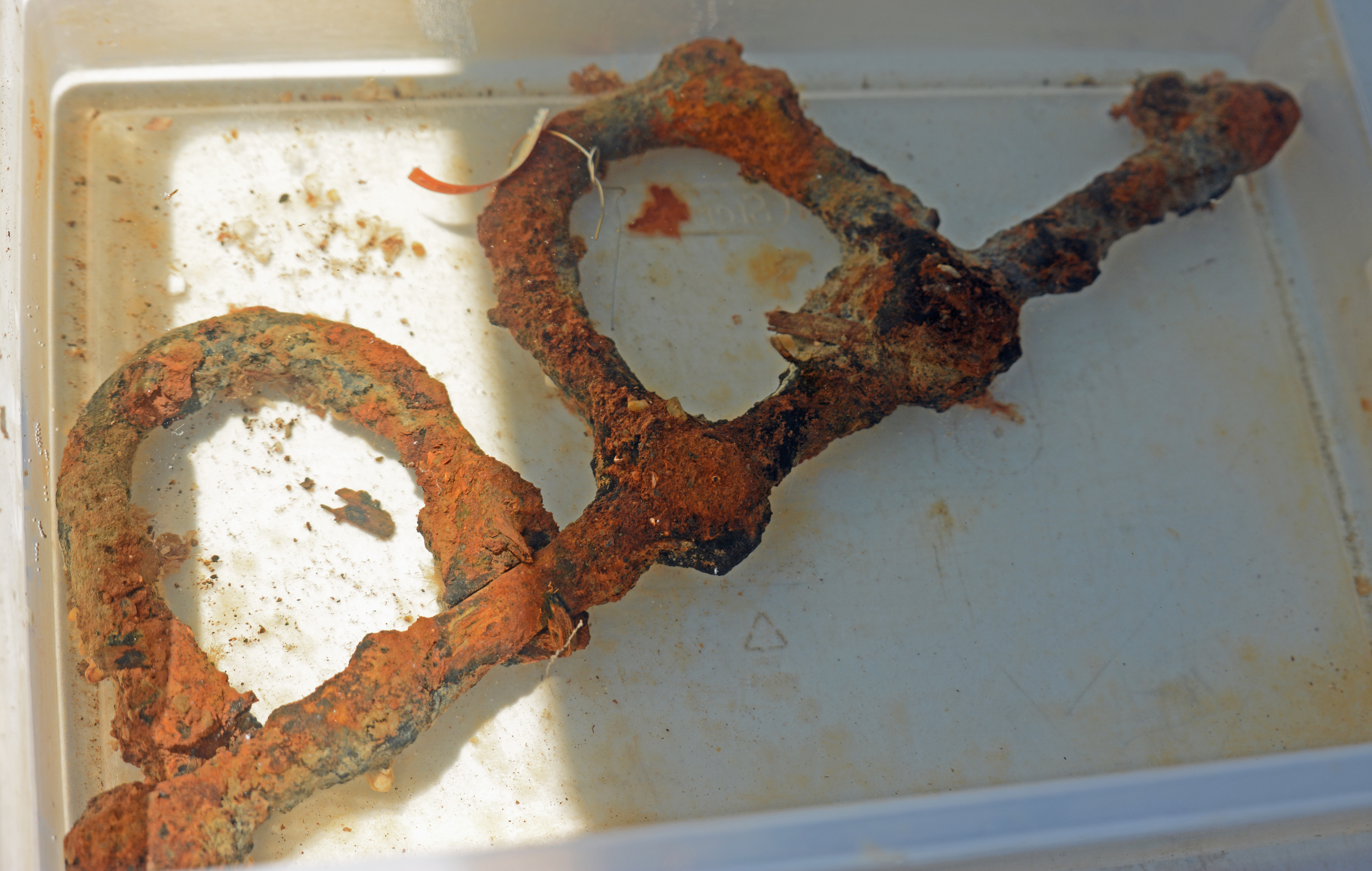
An unrestored iron artifact (heavily corroded)

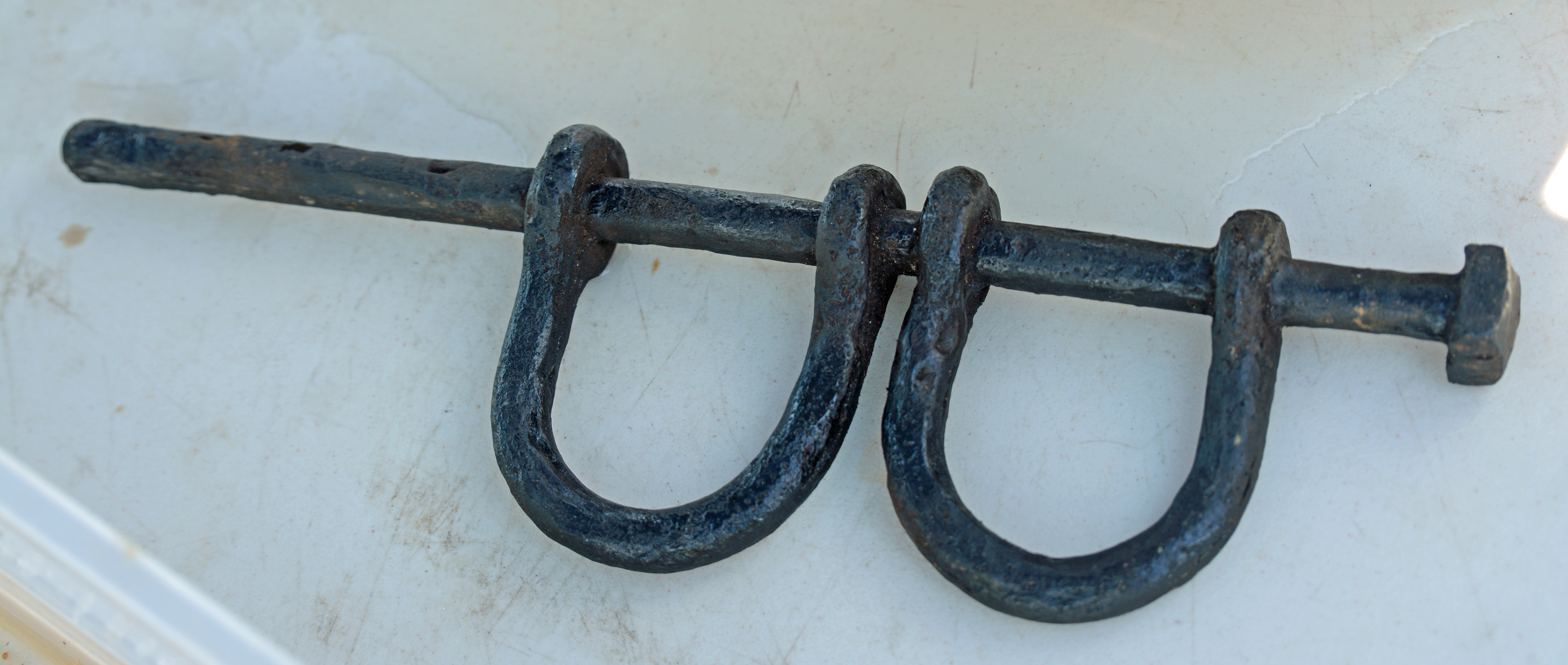
A resin cast model of an iron artifact

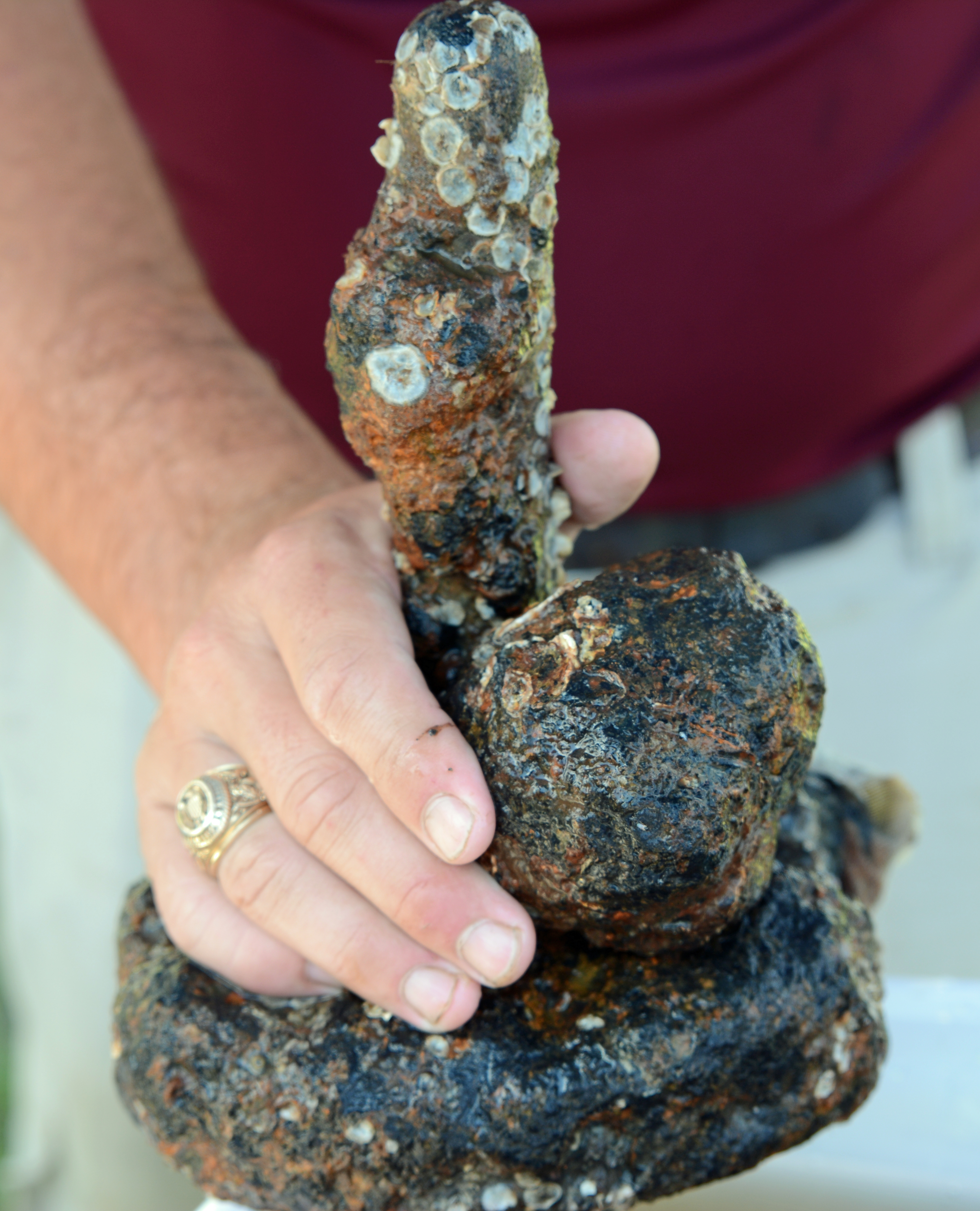
A cannonball and holder for a grapeshot

== See also ==
- Fort James Jackson, CSS Georgia sank in the river next to Fort James Jackson

== Bibliography ==
- Bisbee, Saxon T. (2018). Engines of Rebellion: Confederate Ironclads and Steam Engineering in the American Civil War. Tuscaloosa, Alabama: University of Alabama Press. ISBN 978-0-81731-986-1.
- Canney, Donald L. (2015). The Confederate Steam Navy 1861-1865. Atglen, Pennsylvania: Schiffer Publishing. ISBN 978-0-7643-4824-2.
