= Charles H. Olmstead =

Confederate States Army officer in the American Civil War

Charles Hart Olmstead
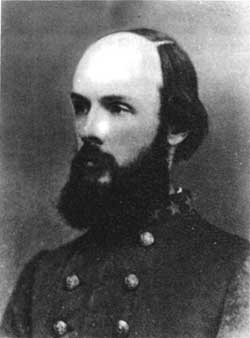
- Col. Charles H. Olmstead
- Born: April 2, 1837; Savannah, Georgia
- Died: August 17, 1926 (aged 89); Savannah, Georgia
- Burial place: Laurel Grove Cemetery, Savannah, Georgia
- Spouse: Florence Williams
- Military career
- Allegiance: Confederate States of America
- Branch: Confederate States Army
- Service years: 1861-1865 (CSA)
- Rank: Colonel
- Commands: 1st Georgia Infantry; Fort Pulaski; Mercer's Brigade
- Conflicts: American Civil War: Battle of Fort Pulaski; Second Battle of Charleston Harbor; Battle of Atlanta; Second Battle of Franklin; Battle of Nashville; Battle of Bentonville
- Other work: businessman

Charles Hart Olmstead (1837–1926) was a Confederate States Army officer during the American Civil War.

== Early life ==
Born in Savannah, Georgia, on April 2, 1837, Olmstead became a graduate of Georgia Military Institute.

== Civil War ==
Olmstead was appointed major of the 1st Georgia Infantry Regiment on May 27, 1861. During this time the colonel of his regiment was Hugh W. Mercer. He was placed in command of Fort Pulaski, after Georgia militia captured the fort on January 6, 1861. In November 1861, Olmstead had an estimated 385 men and 48 cannons to protect it. After a siege and bombardment, Olmstead surrendered the fortress on April 11, 1862, and was a prisoner for several months. Afterwards, Olmstead continued to lead his regiment along the Carolina and Georgia Coast. He participated in the Siege of Battery Wagner while commanding a mixed force from his own 1st (Mercer-Olmstead) Georgia Infantry and the 12th Georgia Artillery Battalion. He then returned to Savannah until the Atlanta Campaign. He and his regiment were sent north to Atlanta as part of Mercer's Brigade and participated in the Battle of Atlanta. He soon found himself and his regiment under the command of Brigadier General James Argyle Smith in the Franklin-Nashville Campaign. At times during this campaign he commanded the whole brigade. He then fought at the Battle of Franklin and the Battle of Nashville. Afterwards he participated in the Carolinas campaign and fought at the Battle of Bentonville before surrendering at Bennet's Place.

== Post war ==
After the war, at the age of 29, he married Florence Williams. Together they raised three daughters: Susan, Sarah, and Florence. He had a successful career in life insurance, shipping, and banking. Afterwards in New York City, he worked in the statistical department of Wanamaker's. In 1912 he wrote his Memoirs. He was 89 years old when he died in Savannah on August 17, 1926. Before his death he had written "I gratefully acknowledge that 'goodness and mercy' have followed me 'all the days of my life'".
