= Fort James Jackson =

- U.S. National Register of Historic Places
- U.S. National Historic Landmark
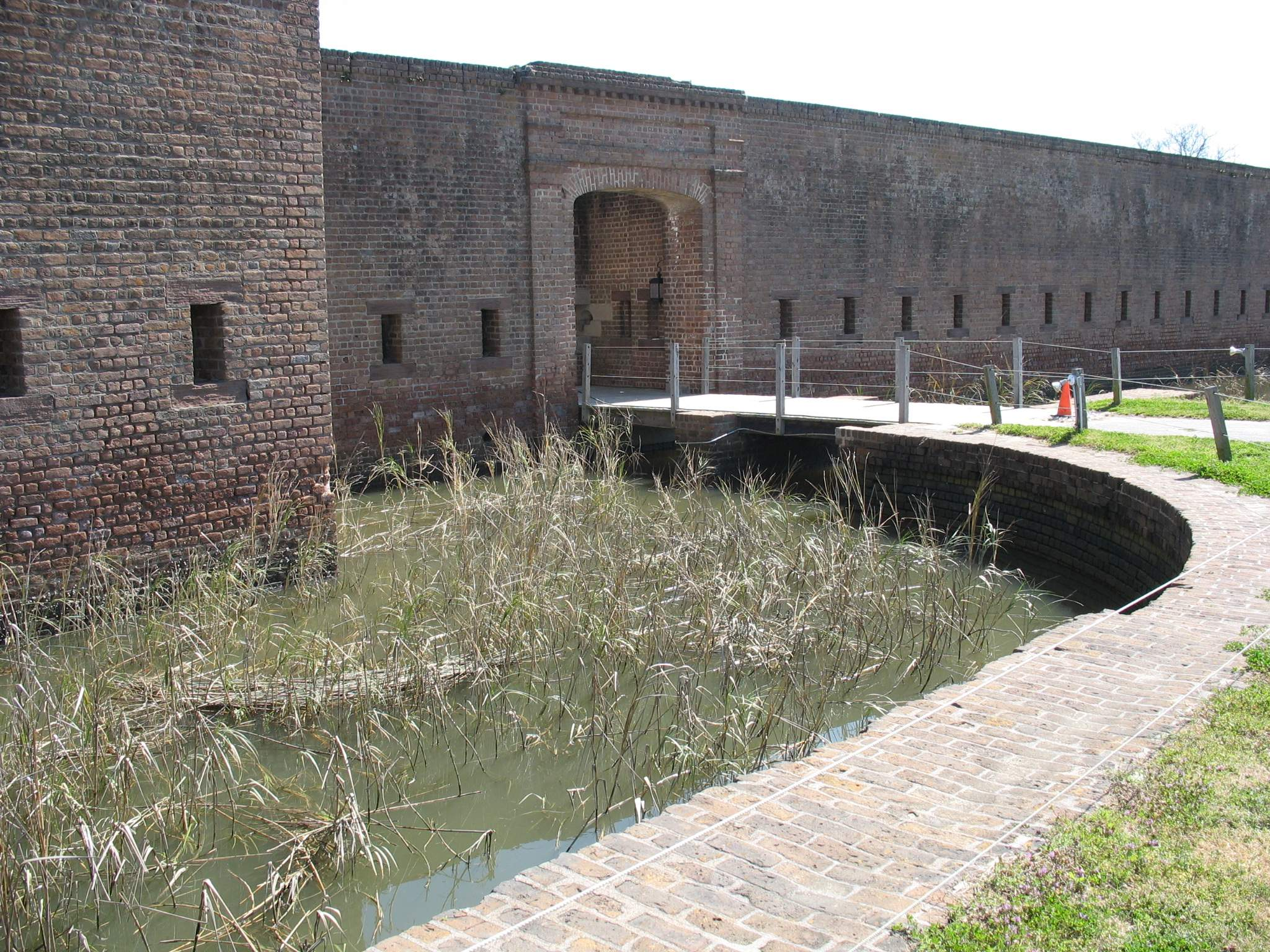
- Moat at Fort Jackson

- Location within Georgia Location within the United States
- Location: Islands Expwy., Chatham County, near Savannah, Georgia
- Coordinates: 32°4′55″N 81°2′10″W
- Built: 1808-1812
- NRHP reference No.: 70000200

Significant dates
- Added to NRHP: February 18, 1970
- Designated NHL: February 16, 2000

Fort James Jackson (usually shortened to Fort Jackson and informally known as Old Fort Jackson) is a restored nineteenth-century fort located one mile east of Savannah, Georgia, on the Savannah River. It is currently operated by the Coastal Heritage Society as Old Fort Jackson, a National Historic Landmark.

The land on which the fort was built, was sold by Nichols Turnbull in 1808. Initially, a structure named Fort Mud was built, but was lost to fire in 1833.

Named in honor of James Jackson (1757–1806), a British-born political figure in Georgia, Fort Jackson was constructed between 1808 and 1812 to protect the city of Savannah from attack by sea. It was engineered by William McRee who had just graduated from West Point. During the American Civil War, it became one of three Confederate forts that defended Savannah from Union forces (the other two were Fort McAllister and Fort Pulaski).

When the Union army commanded by William T. Sherman captured Savannah by land in December 1864, it took Fort Jackson almost immediately.

The fort was renamed Fort Oglethorpe in 1885, in honor of Georgia's founder Lieutenant-General James Edward Oglethorpe. Between 1885 and 1905, the fort was little used by the U.S. military. In 1906, the name Fort Jackson was reinstated. It was purchased by the city of Savannah in 1924 for park purposes and was fully restored in the 1970s. It was declared a National Historic Landmark in 2000.

Fort Jackson is located at 1 Fort Jackson Road, on the Islands Expressway linking Savannah to Fort Pulaski and the town of Tybee Island. Fort Jackson is owned by the state of Georgia and operated as a museum by the Coastal Heritage Society. The Fort has several daily cannon and small-arms firing demonstrations every day of the week.

== See also ==
- Battle of Fort Pulaski, Background, defense in depth.
