= GA4 =

GA4 or GA 4 may refer to:

- Georgia's 4th congressional district, a congressional district in the U.S. state of Georgia
- Georgia State Route 4, a state highway in the eastern part of the state
  - U.S. Route 1 in Georgia, a US highway that is mostly concurrent in the state with SR 4
  - Georgia State Route 4 (1919–1929), a highway that existed from the Alabama state line to Fairmount.
- Gibberellin A4, a form of the gibberellin plant hormone
- Google Analytics' fourth generation, released in 2020

== See also ==
- Georgia 4-H
