= Georgia 4-H =

- Official 4-H emblem.
- Formation: 1904
- Type: Youth organization
- Legal status: Non-profit organization
- Purpose: "To assist youth in acquiring knowledge, developing life skills and forming attitudes that will enable them to become self-directing, productive and contributing citizens."
- Headquarters: Athens, Georgia
- Region served: Statewide
- Members: 175,000 young people in Georgia, ages 9 to 19
- Founder: G.C. Adams
- State 4-H Leader: Melanie Biersmith
- State President: Blair Smith
- Main organ: National Institute of Food and Agriculture (NIFA)
- Parent organization: United States Department of Agriculture (USDA)
- Website: Georgia4h.org

Georgia 4-H was founded in 1904 by G.C. Adams in Newton County, Georgia, United States, as the Girls Canning, and Boys Corn Clubs.

The Georgia 4-H Program is a branch of Georgia Cooperative Extension, which is part of the University of Georgia College of Agriculture and Environmental Sciences, and is funded by the University System of Georgia and private partners.

== History ==
Georgia 4-H began with the start of the special Boys Corn Club contest that was first organized by Superintendent of Schools, G. C. Adams. Like the corn club he organized 100 years ago, G. C. Adams was unique. He ranked high as an educator. He taught at Pine Grove School in Newton County, he was principal of Palmer Institute at Oxford, he served as county school commissioner, and he was the president of the Fifth District Agriculture School at Monroe. Yet, Mr. Adams never attended high school or college, and he did not go to school more than a year in his entire life. While writing about Mr. Adams in the Atlanta Constitution after he had been elected Georgia commissioner of agriculture in 1932, Stiles A. Martin called him "one of the best educated, best read and most learned men in the state."

Perhaps Mr. Adams' greatest accomplishment was organizing the corn club, and he is best known for that; but he was a pioneer in other fields, too. He also single-handedly developed a plan for transporting school children, which probably resulted in our school buses of today. In the same year he organized an oratorical association, the first in the South. The plan was for pupils of the various schools of the county to meet and put on a program, with awards being made to schools making the best showing. Out of this grew the field days which are held in many places today, featuring musical contests, debating and other events. Mr. Adams also served in the state legislature. He was elected to represent Newton County in 1926, and served two years.

W. L. Weber was Mr. Adams' good friend. He was head of the English Department for Emory-at-Oxford College. Mr. Adams and Mr. Weber shared many walks from Oxford to Covington. It was during one of the walks in 1903 that Mr. Weber, who was from Illinois, told Mr. Adams about the success of the first known boys' corn-growing contest, held in Winnebago County, Illinois, during 1900. This idea was spreading very rapidly to other states. "Prof. W.L. Weber, of Emory College, who always manifests great interest in our public school, deserves credit for inaugurating this unique contest in Newton" – G.C. Adams.

From this conversation was the motivation that sparked Mr. Adams to begin making plans, which he would announce during the fall of 1904, for the first Newton County Boys Corn Club, which developed into the present day 4-H club.

First Competitors of the Newton County Boys Corn Club

The plans for the contest were announced in a small article in the Covington Enterprise Newspaper on December 23, 1904. Later, Mr. Adams published the rules for the contest on February 3, 1905, but this time he had a large article that was on the front page. He established a deadline for March 15. The contest was open to any boy 6 to 18 years old, who was enrolled in any of the county's public schools. Each boy would do all work raising his corn crop. There was no limit to variety of corn planted or extent of field. The contestant was not allowed to have any assistance. The boy selected any ten ears of corn out of his entire patch. The boy should nail them in a rat-proof box, delivered it to the Newton County Courthouse by October 7, and it would be weighed on October 16 and the weight will be recorded on the box.

Of the 101 boys entering the contest, only 32 boys exhibited their corn. The first-place winner was George Plunkett with 29.9 lb (13.6 kg). The second-place winner was Tom Greer with 27.8 lb (12.6 kg). The third-place winners were brothers Paul and Walter Cowan, with 25.4 lb (11.5 kg). Other details of this contest are given in the Congressional Record of the 84th Congress, First Session on January 10, 1955.

Around that 1907, Oscar Herman Benson designed the first emblem for the clubs. It was a three-leaf clover, which stood for head, heart and hands. Second year members, received a fourth H. In 1911, the 4-H design was adopted and health was added as the fourth H. The emblem has stood for head, heart, hands and health ever since.

Girls Tomato Canning Club in Georgia celebrate Georgia 4-H's 50th anniversary.

The Corn Club was followed by many agricultural project clubs in the county and state. The most famous club was the Girls Canning Club, in 1911. Just as the boys' work started with one crop, the same method was used for the girls' club work. The tomato was selected because it was universally grown and appreciated. It wasn't too difficult to get a good crop. It was acid and therefore easy to can without too much spoilage. Each girl was asked to plant a plot large enough to provide tomatoes not only for family but also for sale.

By the time Congress passed the Smith-Lever Act, May 8, 1914, creating the Cooperative Extension Service, both boys and girls, all over Georgia, were active in one or more of the project clubs. Their work was supervised by volunteer leaders and a few paid workers in some counties. After 1914, the County Agents and Home Demonstration Agents were being employed in counties throughout Georgia. Positions are funded by county, state, and federal funds. These Agents would give the leadership to disseminating agricultural and home economic research information to farmers, homemakers, youth, and community organizations. Also in 1914, the Georgia Poultry Club was started, which required each member to prepare at least one setting of purebred eggs. By 1915, Georgia had 5,507 club girls and 14,275 club boys.

About 1921, serious thought began to be given to the matter of trying to bring back interest and develop a steady growth in 4-H club work. Businessmen and leaders of agricultural organizations established the National Committee on Boys and Girls Club Work with E.T. Meredith as chairperson in 1921. The organization was held in Chicago, where the first National 4-H Club Congress was held in 1922. President Calvin Coolidge accepted honorary chairmanship of the National Committee on Boys and Girls Work, the start of a tradition followed by each succeeding U.S. President. This was also about the time that the name 4-H Club came about, instead of project clubs. It was thought that the emphasis should be placed on the community, county, and state organization of 4-H club members and that there should be combined with this organization idea, emphasis on social, recreational, and leadership training.

Under the leadership of Mary Creswell and J. Phil Campbell, Georgia 4-H Clubs grew from 350 members in 1910 to 27,000 in 1920. It wasn't until 1924 when club work acquired the name of 4-H and the 4-H emblem was patented. In 1927, state 4-H leaders adopted the national 4-H pledge and the 4-H motto at the first National 4-H Club Camp. In 1933, Georgia started the first Wildlife Conservation Camp. P. H. Stone became the first Negro state 4-H leader in Georgia in 1924. By 1937, Georgia has county agents working in every county and 4-H enrollment had grown to 82,962. Land was acquired in 1939 in Dublin, Georgia, to build the Negro 4-H Center. The center had 150 meetings for 5,000 people annually. The headquarters for black Extension work was at Savannah State College until 1967.

With U.S. entry into World War II, 4-H'ers across the country responded to the needs for increased agricultural production and support of the war effort. 4-H members were directly responsible for more than 77,000 head of dairy cattle, 246,000 swine and 210,000 head of other cattle. 4-H contributed more than 40,000 tongs of forage crops and 109,000 bushels of root crops. By 1942, 4-H had 1.6 million members, gaining 650,000 new members during the war.

District Project Achievement (DPA) Meetings were set up in each Extension District in 1935. The Georgia Master 4-H Club was created during the same year. Becoming a Master 4-H'er is the highest award offered in 4-H. The first District Project Achievement meeting was held at Camp Wilkins with 200 members present. As an outgrowth of these contests and state contests, a State 4-H Club Congress was first held in Atlanta, Georgia in 1943 with 53 4-H club members attending.

In 1948, the Georgia 4-H Club Foundation was organized to help further 4-H work in the state. The Foundation helped establish 4-H Club Centers at Rock Eagle and Dublin. Each 4-H Club member was asked to donate one dozen eggs to the Foundation during 1949. By year's end there was $7,000 in the bank. In 1952, construction began on Rock Eagle near Eatonton, Georgia. Bill Sutton raised $2.5 million to build the center on a 1,400-acre (5.7 km^{2}) tract of land. The Center was dedicated oct. 30, 1954. It is now one of the largest 4-H Centers in the country, hosting 4-H'ers, students and adults year-round for 4-H camp, environmental education and conferences.

In 1963, the World Atlas of 4-H was published by the National 4-H Foundation, indicating 84 4-H and similar programs in 75 countries. Georgia's enrollment of 150,000 was the largest in the nation. In 1956, Newton County 4-H boys and girls worked at Belks, to raise money to help finance other members who were selected as county winners to represent Newton County at the Northwest District Project Achievement at Rock Eagle 4-H Center. Newton County had two Extension Programs, a white and a black, until 1965 when they were combined under the leadership of one County Extension Director. The black extension staff was transferred from Savannah State College to Fort Valley State College in 1967. Both the University of Georgia and Fort Valley State University now conduct active 4-H programs for all Georgia youth.

4-H'ers celebrated the nation's bicentennial in 1976 with a new citizenship program called The Sunshine Brigade and rode an old-fashioned wagon train to the nation's capitol. In 1994, 4-H joined the Character Counts! Coalition to develop a training program for teens to work with young members on the six pillars of character. Georgia 4-H has been an active participant and leader in this effort.

In 2008, Georgia 4-H had 180,000 members. Georgia 4-H'ers continue to take part in judging competition, knowledge quiz bowls, livestock shows, animal education shows, food and nutrition contests, teen leadership programs, essay contest, educational camps and conferences, Clovers & Co. performing arts group, the International 4-H Youth Exchange program and many other educational and recreational opportunities.

=== March 2010 cancellation scare ===
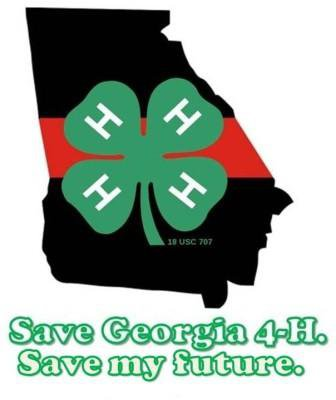
Created by 4-H'er James Conor Dunn, this logo surfaced online media during the 2010 cancelation scare of the Georgia 4-H program.

On March 1, 2010, it was announced that University of Georgia President Michael F. Adams had proposed to the University System of Georgia's Board of Regents that the Georgia 4-H Program be completely eliminated in the wake of $300 million in budget cuts made by the University System.

== Organization ==
=== Cloverleaf, Junior, and Senior 4-H'ers ===
The Georgia 4-H Club classifies its 4-H'ers into three different groups: Cloverleafs, Juniors, and Seniors. Cloverleafs are 4th, 5th and 6th grade 4-H'ers, Juniors are 7th and 8th, and Seniors are 9th-12th grade 4-H'ers. Cloverleaf 4-H'ers may be involved in showing livestock, presenting projects up to the district level, and running for office at the school level. Should they stay active in the club long enough to become Juniors, they become eligible to attend events such as Junior Conference and District Project Achievement weekend, both held annually in winter. Seventh grade Junior 4-H'ers are also eligible to run for their district's Junior 4-H Board of Directors. Upon becoming Seniors in the summer after their eighth grade year, 4-H'ers may attend State 4-H Council and Fall Forum, compete at District Project Achievement for a trip to State 4-H Congress the following summer, and run for their district's Senior 4-H Board of Directors or the Georgia 4-H Board of Directors.

=== Georgia 4-H districts ===
Georgia 4-H is split up into four districts to represent all 159 counties in the state of Georgia; Northeast, Northwest, Southeast, and Southwest.

The Northeast District serves the following counties: Baldwin, Banks, Barrow, Butts, Clarke, Columbia, Dawson, Elbert, Fannin, Franklin, Gilmer, Glascock, Greene, Habersham, Hall, Hancock, Hart, Jackson, Jasper, Jones, Lincoln, Lumpkin, Madison, McDuffie, Monroe, Morgan, Oconee, Oglethorpe, Pickens, Putnam, Rabun, Richmond, Stephens, Towns, Union, Walton, Warren, White, and Wilkes.

The Northwest District serves the following counties: Bartow, Bibb, Carroll, Catoosa, Chattahoochee, Chattooga, Cherokee, Clayton, Cobb, Coweta, Crawford, Dade, DeKalb, Douglas, Fayette, Floyd, Forsyth, Fulton, Gordon, Gwinnett, Haralson, Harris, Heard, Henry, Lamar, Meriwether, Murray, Muscogee, Newton, Paulding, Pike, Polk, Rockdale, Spalding, Talbot, Troup, Upson, Walker, and Whitfield.

The Southeast District serves the following counties: Appling, Atkinson, Bacon, Bleckley, Brantley, Bryan, Bulloch, Burke, Camden, Candler, Charlton, Chatham, Coffee, Dodge, Effingham, Emanuel, Evans, Glynn, Jeff Davis, Jefferson, Jenkins, Johnson, Laurens, Liberty, Long County, Georgia, McIntosh, Montgomery, Pierce, Screven, Tattnall, Telfair, Toombs, Treutlen, Twiggs, Ware, Washington, Wayne, Wheeler, and Wilkinson.

The Southwest District serves the following counties: Baker, Ben Hill, Berrien, Brooks, Calhoun, Clay, Clinch, Colquitt, Cook, Crisp, Decatur, Dooly, Dougherty, Early, Echols, Grady, Houston, Irwin, Lanier, Lee, Lowndes, Macon, Marion, Miller, Mitchell, Peach, Pulaski, Quitman, Randolph, Schley, Seminole, Stewart, Sumter, Taylor, Terrell, Thomas, Tift, Turner, Webster, Wilcox, and Worth.

== Georgia 4-H activities and events ==
Georgia 4-H offers an array of competitions, conventions, and training retreats that instill in its participants a number of valuable skills that will benefit them throughout the course of their lives. Events are usually coordinated by District or State 4-H Staff, a volunteer leaders, and a peer-elected Board of Directors.

4-H'ers have the opportunity to experience responsibility in projects dealing with livestock, judging, and other programs. Georgia 4-H partners with Georgia FFA and the UGA Animal and Dairy Science Department to provide several of these programs. Every year, 2,400 4-H'ers complete a year-long process to prepare more than 4,500 animals for exhibition at the Georgia Junior National Livestock Show and other competitions.

=== Georgia 4-H State Board of Directors ===
The election of the Georgia 4-H Board of Directors is held during State 4-H Council with the annual meeting of the Georgia Council. The election is a peer election with voters from each of the counties in attendance. Each district is awarded a maximum number of votes for the election. Candidates make use of campaign speeches, skits, meets & greets, extemporaneous questions and campaigning to be elected. The general election is held first with voting delegates selecting five individuals from the general poll. The top vote getter will be president, second will be vice president and other three will be state representatives. The remaining candidates are returned to district ballots with each voting delegate selecting one from their district election.

=== Dean's Award ===
Receiving a Dean's Award is considered one of the highest honors that a 4-H'er can earn. Participants create a resumè in the areas of Leadership, Citizenship, Communications and the Arts, Agricultural and Environmental Sciences, and Family and Consumer Sciences, and compete in an interview Winners become Master 4-H'ers, earn a $500 scholarship, a medallion and are recognized at the Annual Banquet of Georgia 4-H Congress and 4-H & Leadership Day at the Capitol.

=== District Project Achievement ===
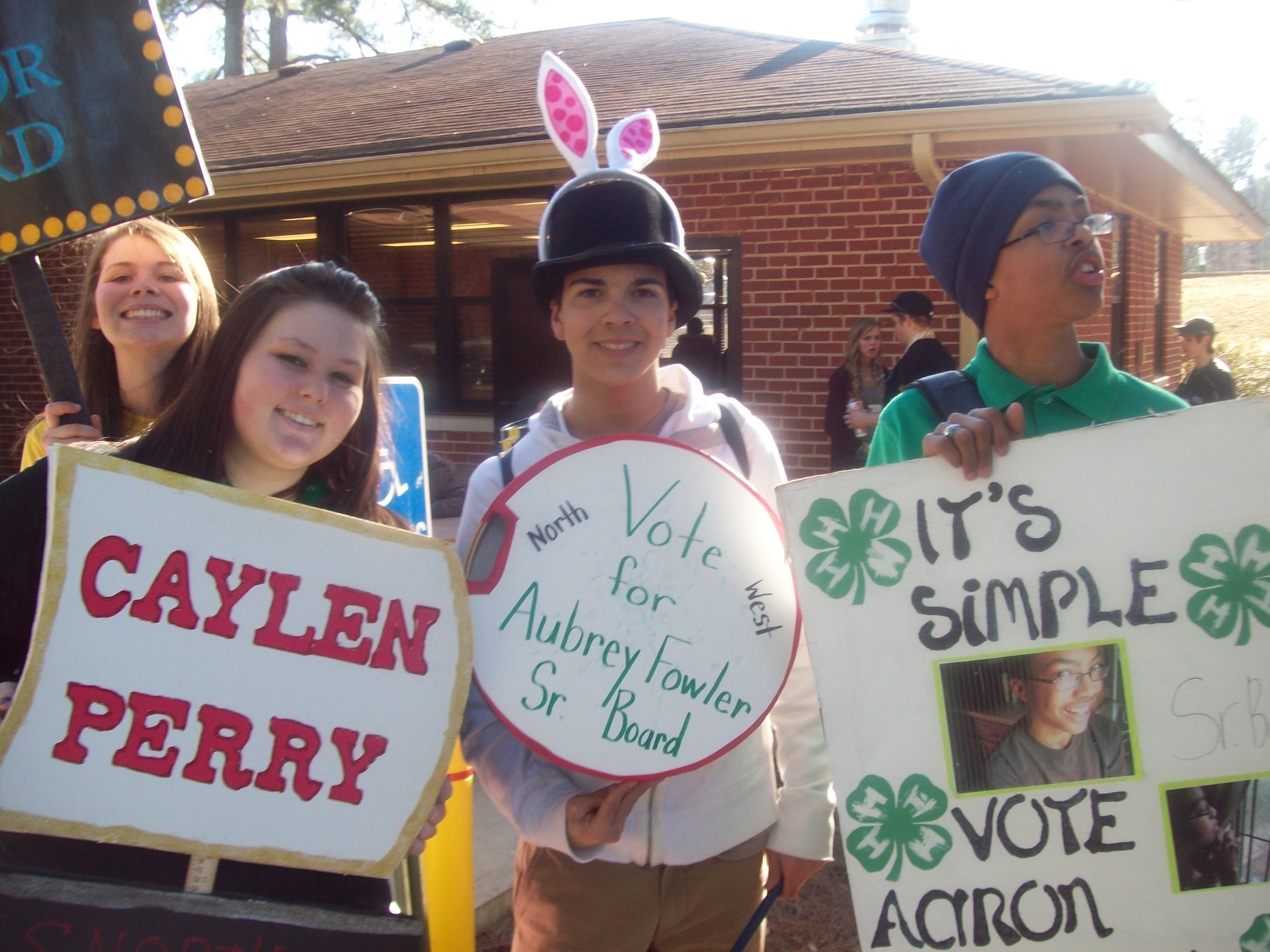
Northwest District 4-H'ers campaigning for a spot on the Northwest District 4-H Council.

District Project Achievement is a competitive weekend spent with for 4-H'ers in their corresponding district at Rock Eagle. During the weekend, 4-H'ers share their knowledge about a particular subject to others in a presentation. "4-H'ers chose from project areas for their presentations. Project areas included international, veterinary science, air science, computers, water conservation, photography, public speaking, plant and soils, performing arts, safety, agriculture awareness, poultry, beef, sports, etc" (Chapman).

Cloverleaf 4-H'ers are allowed a five-minute setup time with six minutes for their presentations; four minutes for performing arts. Junior 4-H'ers allowed a five-minute setup time with ten minutes for their demonstration; four minutes for performing arts. Senior 4-H'ers are allowed a five-minute setup time with twelve minutes for their demonstration; ten minutes for public speaking and four minutes for performing arts. This demonstration or performance is in front of a panel of three judges and a small audience.

Junior and Senior 4-H'ers have a portfolio they must turn in before competing. This portfolio is a one-year record of project work, leadership and service. The portfolio is scored separately from the presentation and added to the overall score. Junior 4-H'ers are scored 40% on portfolios and 60% on demonstrations. Senior 4-H'ers are scored 50% on portfolios and 50% on presentations. The Senior 4-H winners of District Project Achievement advance to State Congress in hopes to become a state winners.

In addition to competitions, attendees are given the chance to participate in community service projects and recreational games throughout the weekend. It is also an opportunity for 4-H'ers to run for Junior or Senior District Board of Directors.

=== State 4-H Council ===
State Council is an annual meeting of Georgia senior 4-H'ers This event is open to all Senior 4-H'ers, including rising 9th graders and recently graduated 12th graders, and is planned by the incumbent Georgia 4-H Board of Directors. Between the Iron Clover Competition and the election of the new Georgia 4-H Board of Directors Georgia 4-H Council always guarantees its participants a fun and eventful weekend.

==== The Iron Clover Competition ====
The annual Iron Clover Competition is held at State 4-H Council. This event takes its name from the iron statue of the 4-H emblem currently standing in front of Sutton Hall at Rock Eagle and designed to commemorate the district wide competition. During the competition, each district of the Georgia 4-H Club - Northeast, Southeast, Northwest, and Southwest - competes against one another in fun athletic competitions ranging from softball to ultimate frisbee to canoeing. At the end of the weekend, the district team that has been awarded the most Iron Clover points has won the title of "Iron Clover Champion" for their district in the coming year.

==== Board of Directors election ====
Those who are elected to State 4-H Office proceed immediately to Georgia Officer Training, which lasts until noon on the following Wednesday. The new officers are installed each year at the Thursday night banquet at State 4-H Congress.

=== Georgia National Fair ===
The Georgia National Fair celebrated its 20th anniversary with 416,709 attending. It has been named into the Top 50 Fairs. It supports various organizations such as 4-H, FFA, FBLA, FCCLA, and TSA. It is always held around the second week of October. The next fair will be October 6–16, 2011. There are several 4-H activities throughout the fair week such as:

Photo Contest, the contest is for youth and adults. Individuals can submit photos into two different categories: General 4-H Photos, Focus on 4-H Youth & Adult and Focus on Agriculture. Top 10 photos are displayed at the Georgia National Fair and the top 20 are displayed at 4-H State Congress. Other competitions include Mini-Exhibits, Talent Contest, Speech Contest, Quiz bowls, Pumpkin Contest, and Chicken BBQ Contests. Also Swine, Sheep, Cattle, Goat, and Horse shows are held for 4-H'ers to compete in. Every year Georgia 4-H also hosts the Clover Café food booth with chicken donated by the Georgia Poultry Commission; it's cheap and the profit goes to help sponsor activities in the Georgia 4-H program. 4-H Volunteers, Collegiate 4-H'ers, and Senior 4-H'ers may volunteer to work in the booth.

=== I am Georgia 4-H ===
The "I am Georgia 4-H" campaign was being planned and grew from the stories and tributes from in March 2012 when Georgia 4-H was slated for elimination. The purpose of the campaign is to promote Georgia 4-H throughout the state and for former and current members to share how 4-H has changed and affected their life in a positive way.

=== Leadership Day at the Capitol ===
The Leadership Day at the Capitol is sponsored by the Department of Community Affairs, the Fanning Institute, Georgia 4-H and the Georgia Academy for Economic Development. Leadership Day is a time when leaders from all across Georgia come together to share best practices and success stories and identify ways to improve leadership efforts in Georgia. Combined with 4-H Day at the Capitol, it provides 4-H'ers an opportunity to learn about all the leadership opportunities offered in their communities, listen to great speakers, tour the state capitol and meet with their representatives.

=== Operation Military Kids ===
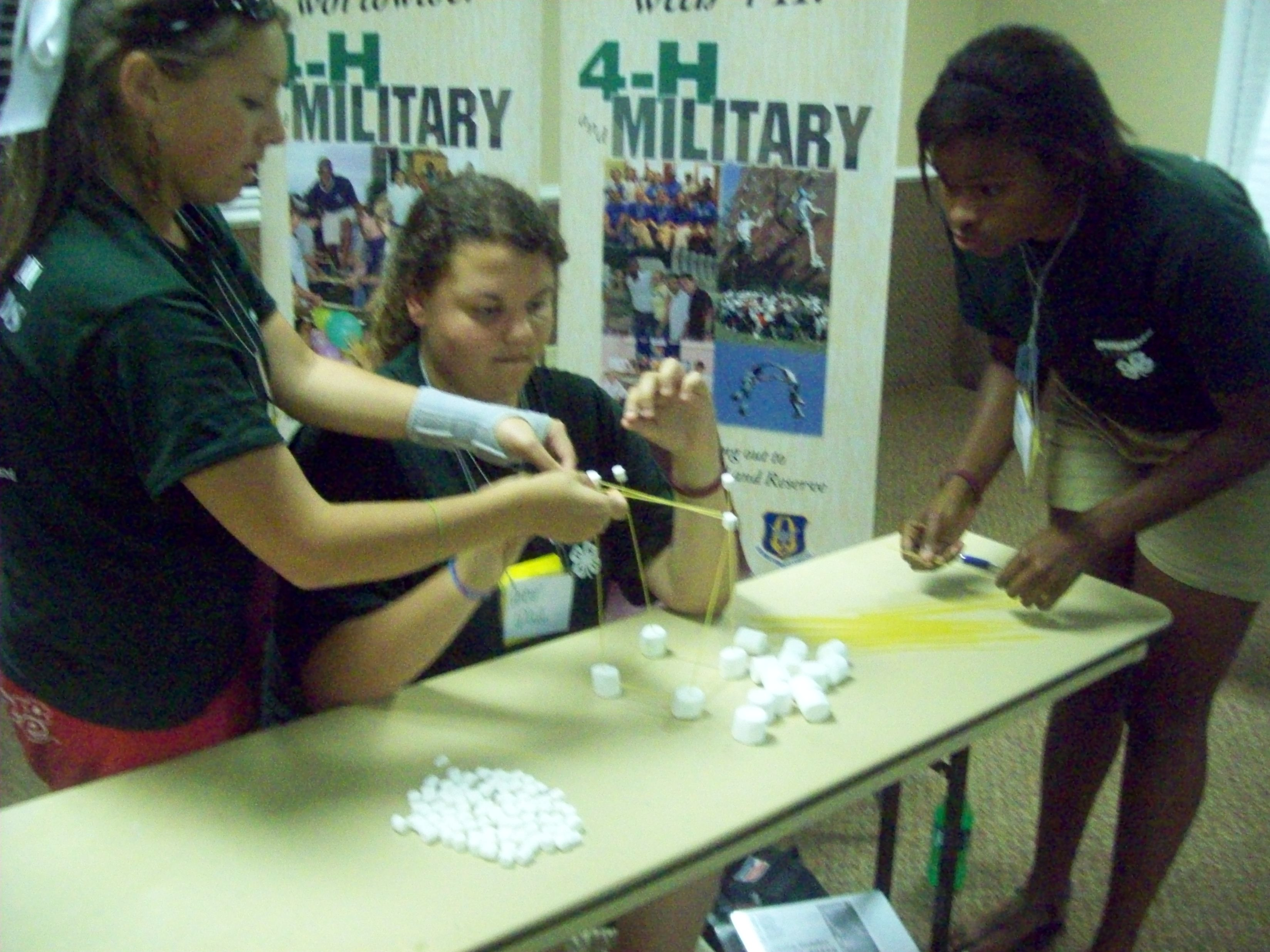
Georgia 4-H'ers participating in a team-building exercise during Operation Military Kids Ambassador Training.

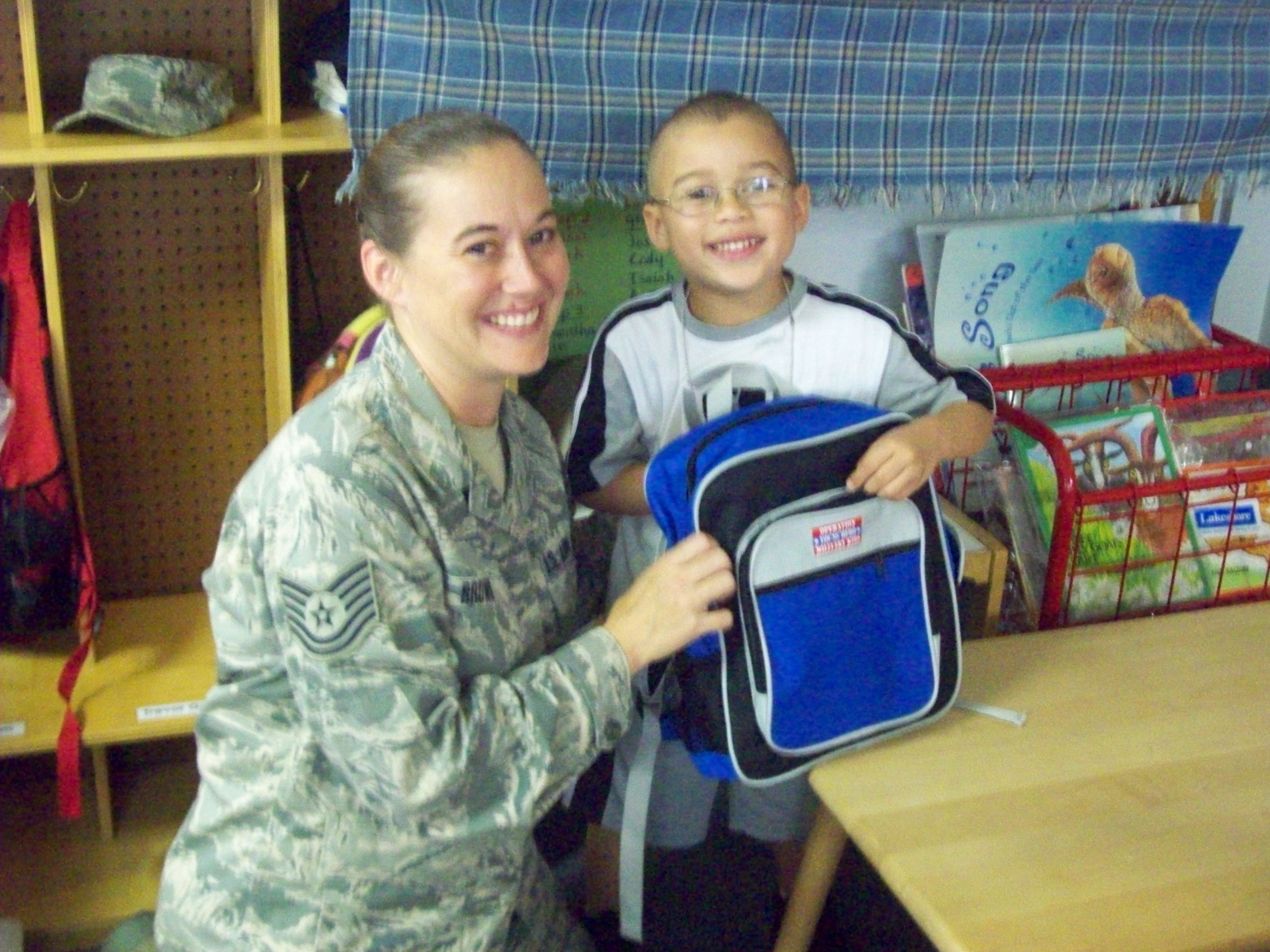
Military youth and his mother receiving an OMK Hero Pack.

Operation Military Kids (OMK) is a branch of Georgia 4-H that reaches out to youth with a family member deployed in military service. During the summer, OMK, partners with the Georgia National Guard for a week of summer camp at the Wahsega 4-H center in Dahlonega.

The youth that attend have families in the Georgia National Guard or currently deployed overseas. In 2009 the Naval Submarine Base Kings Bay was announced the top military 4-H club of the year.

=== State 4-H Congress ===
Georgia State 4-H Congress is a four-day event filled with competitions, interviews, tours, and relaxation. Delegates to State 4-H Congress must win first place or receive a sweepstakes scholarship in their project field from their respective district in order to attend. At State 4-H Congress delegates compete against other first place or sweepstakes winners in the project field in which they competed at District Project Achievement. After or before the delegates demonstration they must go to a panel of judges to discuss their portfolio, a resume of their project work over the course of the year. Once the presentation and portfolio discussion are completed these two scores are tallied and it becomes the delegates overall score. If he or she wins first place in their project they will become state winners and may represent Georgia at National 4-H Congress.

The day after competition the delegates will begin their tours. They tour businesses and buildings that supported their project and provided funding for them to be able to participate during the week. Tours in the past have been at Turner Field, CNN Center, and the Crowne Plaza Perimeter-Ravinia Hotel to name a few. The penultimate day of the week occurs at Six Flags Over Georgia where delegates to get relax with friends in the park all day. Before leaving to go back to the hotel they announce the new Master 4-H'ers at the park.

=== Georgia 4-H Communications Team ===
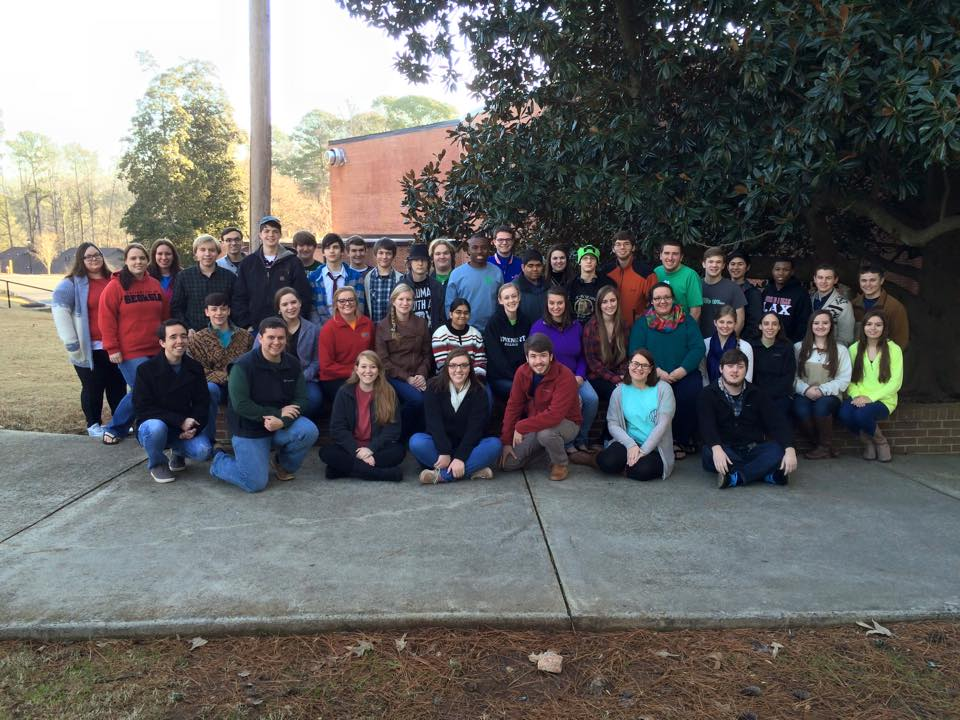
2015-2016 Technology and Communications Team

The Georgia 4-H Communication Team's goal is to increase the use of computer technology including communication, computer programming, engineering, GPS/GIS systems, graphic design, photography, podcasting, science, teaching and training 4-H'ers and adults, web development, web and technology program delivery, wireless technology, writing, and videography to better the Georgia 4-H Program. The communications team has also implemented the new 4-H Science, Engineering, and Technology, 4-H SET, standards into activities for the communications team.

The communications team meets twice a year for retreats; they have been held at Rock Eagle, The University of Georgia Miller Learning Center in Athens, and Founder's Lodge. During the retreats the tech team members are split into tracks: graphics track, videography track, web development track, and the GPS/GIS track. These track groups are taught and led by Collegiate Advisors, past members of the tech team that volunteer their time. The Collegiate Advisors lead the track groups through projects presented during the weekend. These projects are community service projects which help the 4-H'er build their portfolio.

==== Need-A-Computer Program ====
The Need-A-Computer Program is conducted by the Georgia 4-H Communications Team. The program is open to Cloverleaf, Junior, and Senior 4-H'ers. The team receives a number of donated computers from various businesses and schools and later refurbishes them to distribute to children on a need basis. The program was founded by Collegiate Advisors Rachel and Amanda McCarthy. It started when Rachel and her father, Jim McCarthy, refurbished old computers and donated them to 4-H'ers in Walton County that were in need of one.

The donated computers are desktop computers with a Pentium III or higher, 850 mHz, 256 megabytes of RAM, and a 20 gigabyte hard drive. All computers ship with a monitor, keyboard, mouse, and speakers; computers are delivered at Fall Forum each year. In 2009, the Georgia 4-H Technology Communications Team, received the State Farm Youth Advisory Team Grant that has helped the team with refurbishing and distributing the computers.

==== Cyber Security Initiative ====
In 2010 the Georgia 4-H Youth Leadership Technology Team, later in the year changed to Georgia 4-H Communications Team, created a branch of the team called the Cyber Security Initiative (CSI). This small team travels around the state of Georgia to teach free classes on internet and social networking safety as well as cyber bullying.

=== The Georgia 4-H Clovers and Co. Performing Arts Group ===
Founded in 1981, Clovers & Co. provides the opportunity for 4-H youth to participate in a performing arts group. Members from throughout the state audition for a limited number of spots on the cast and crew. The group is composed of talented singers, dancers, musicians and stagehands ranging in age from 9 to 19. Graduates of the group have gone on to have careers in music and entertainment that are nationally recognized.

Clovers & Co. performs throughout the state and country at 4-H events as well as those for other organizations, including the events held at the University of Georgia for the 1996 Olympics.

== Camping and counselor program ==
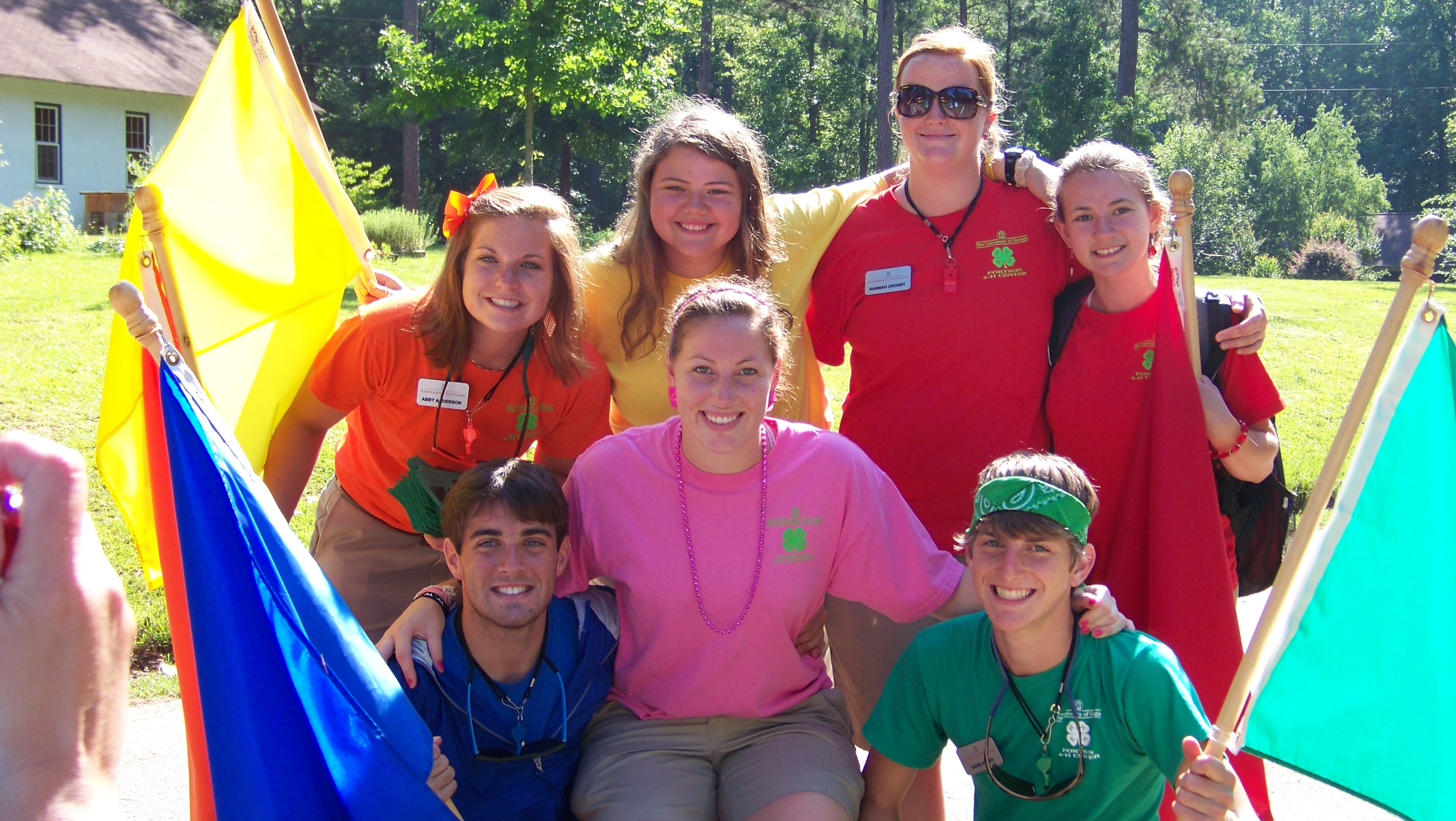
2010 Camp Fortson 4-H Camp Counselors — They are organized by colors and crews; Blue Crew, Orange Crew, Yellow Crew, Red Crew, Green Crew, and Crew Chief Mary.

Summer camp has been a favorite experience of many 4-H'ers and adults, who were once 4-H'ers. At cloverleaf camp, 5th and 6th graders have the chance to swim, rock climb, canoe, take part in several workshops, and the infamous wet games. The wet games is basically a water war between the counselors and the campers; it involves games, buckets of water, and a large slip & slide.

Junior 4-H'ers (7th & 8th graders) also have the chance to go to camp. Their camp is more for the older child. They have the chance to go to the laser show at Stone Mountain, Six Flags White Water, Thursday Night Thunder at the Atlanta Motor Speedway, swim, and more. Senior 4-H'ers are 9th through 12th graders. They also have the chance to go to camp.

Senior Camp is designed around teenagers. They get to go whitewater rafting, dances, workshops, and much more. Seniors also have the chance to go to cloverleaf camp as a teen leader, where they get to help counselors and leaders. There are also some special interest camps like Wilderness Challenge and Marine Resource.

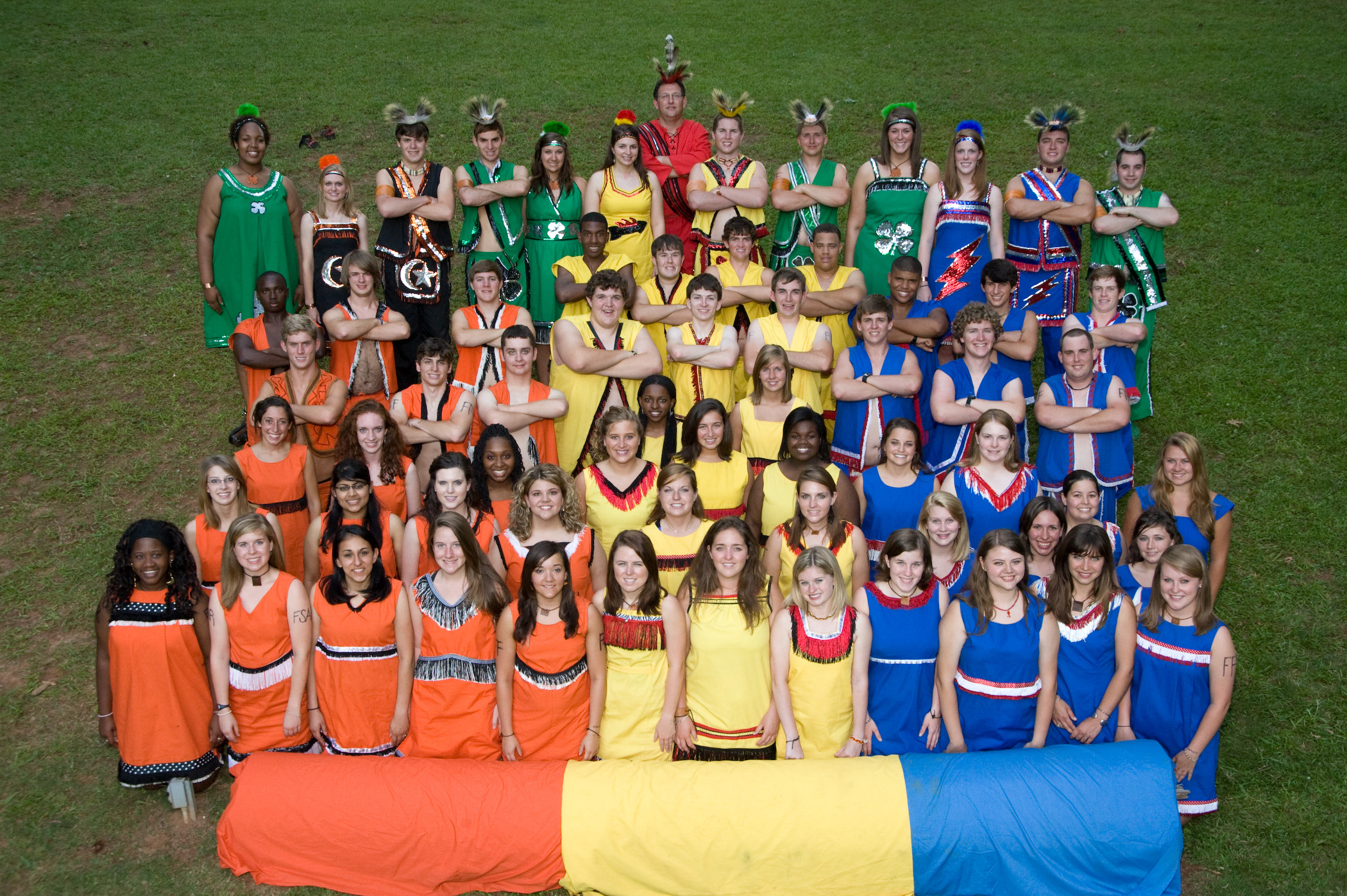
2009 Rock Eagle 4-H Camp Counselors. They are organized by colours — green coloured are Tribal Council; orange coloured are the Cherokee tribe; yellow coloured are the Muskogee tribe; and blue coloured are the Shawnee tribe. Starting in 2024, the four tribes were renamed to fit a new bird theme: orange became the Skybirds, yellow became the Firebirds, blue became the Thunderbirds, and green was renamed to Eagle Council.

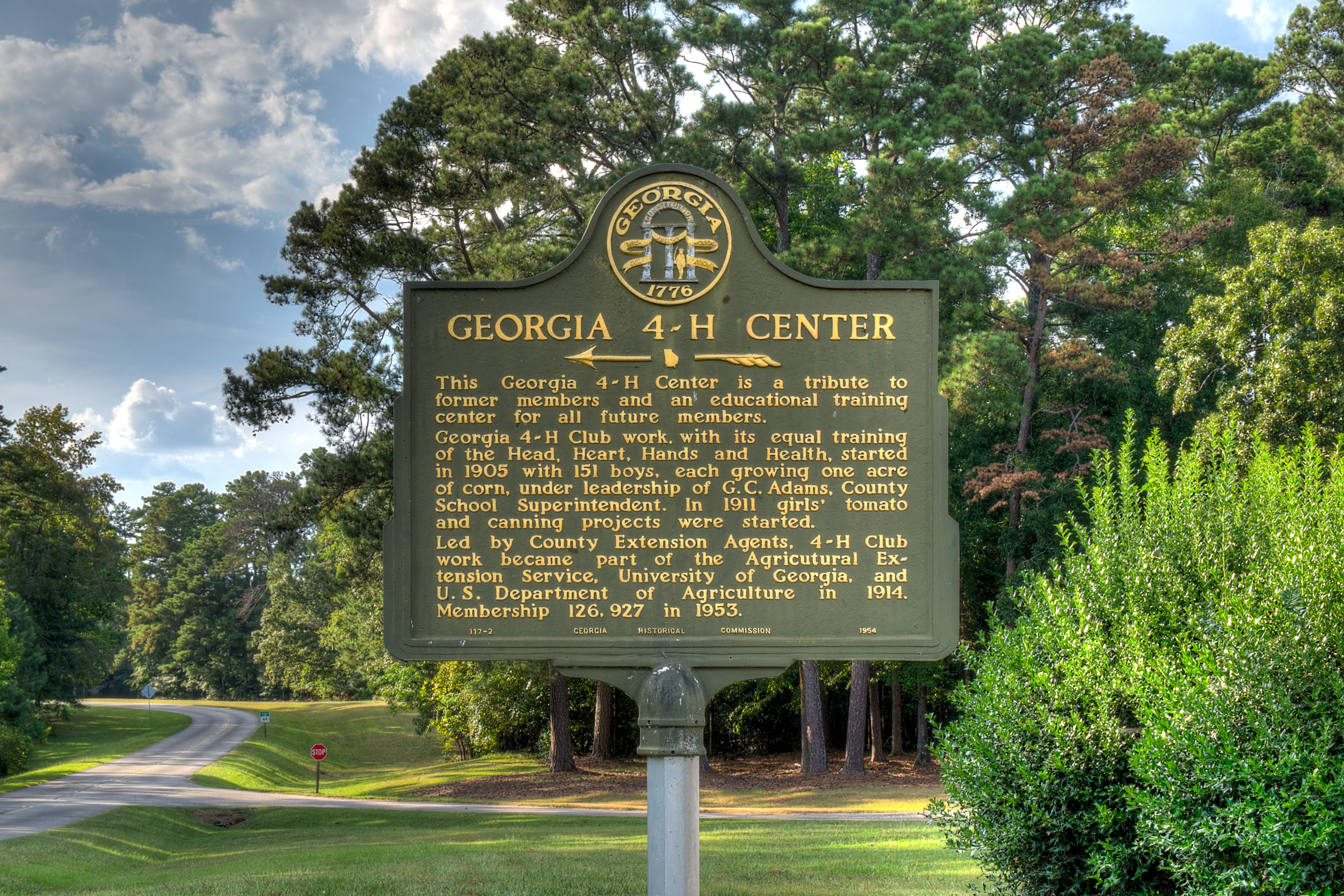
Georgia 4-H Center historic marker

Rock Eagle 4-H Center is the largest 4-H center. It is centered on the Rock Eagle, which is an eagle made out of rock, which was made by the Native Americans. It has 57 cabins, an auditorium, a chapel, and dining hall. During the summer, Rock Eagle holds 1,000 campers every week for seven weeks. The camp can hold a maximum of 1200 people at any one time. Not only is the camp home to many 4-H'ers, but it also houses many other organizations, when 4-H'ers are not there. Rock Eagle holds many events other camp, like State 4-H Council, Fall Forum, Jr. Conference, Jr. Rally, District Project Achievement (DPA), and more.

Cabin number 37 is the G. C. Adams cabin and was funded by many donations from Newton County citizens. In 1952 the Covington Women's Club led a project to raise $10,000 to fund the cabin.

Over 9,000 children ages 9–19 annually attend one of Georgia 4-H's Camps' for a week, each summer.

Georgia 4-H has 5 separate 4-H Centers each with its own camping program.

The 5 Georgia 4-H Centers are

- Wahsega 4-H Center located in Dahlonega, Georgia
- Burton 4-H Center located on Tybee Island
- Camp Jekyll located on Jekyll Island
- Fortson 4-H Center located in Hampton, Georgia
- Rock Eagle 4-H Center located in Eatonton, Georgia and known as the largest youth center in the world

Note: In 2004 Camp Fortson was officially opened to replace camp Truitt-Fulton.

The camping program and counselor program are considered highly effective. The Georgia 4-H Counselor Alumni Association represents 4-H counselor alumni who continue to support Georgia 4-H.

== Notable alumni ==
- Arch Smith, State 4-H Leader (2011–2022) and University of Georgia College of Agriculture and Environmental Science senior public service associate faculty member.
- Lee Berger, State 4-H President 1984, National Geographic Explorer and Paleoanthropologist. Winner of the 1st National Geographic Prize for Research and Exploration
- Carol Buffard, actress, played the lead role in Junie B. Jones, the Musical
- Bob Burton, CEO of Flowers Inc. Balloons and burton + Burton, famous for the "greeting card balloon"
- Bo Ryles, State 4-H Leader and Director of 4-H 1994-2009. Clovers and Company Director and Co Director 1983–present.
- Maxine Burton, president of Flowers, Inc. Balloons and burton + Burton, famous for the "greeting card balloon"
- Rosalynn Carter, former first lady and wife of President Jimmy Carter
- James M. "Bucky" Cook, Former President of Heavenly Ham
- Shania Twain, country music singer
- Nikki DeLoach, former member of Clovers & Company is from Blackshear, Georgia.
- Nancy Grace, Hosts her own primetime legal analysis program "Nancy Grace" on CNN Headline News as well as "Closing Arguments" on Court TV.
- Bill Gentry of the Atlanta country music club Wild Bill's, located in Duluth, Georgia.
- Hillary Lindsey, songwriter.
- Greg Kinnear, actor.
- Tommy Irvin, Former State Representative for Habersham County, Georgia and Georgia Commissioner of Agriculture.
- Jennifer Nettles, Grammy Award winning country singer and member of the group "Sugarland."
- Otis O'neal, Extension Agent and founder of Ham and Eggs Show
- Kathy S. Palmer, Chief Superior Court Judge of the Georgia Middle Judicial Court.
- Walter Reeves, The "Georgia Gardener" and host of the "Lawn and Garden Show with Walter Reeves"
- Tom Rodgers, Head of Georgia 4-H between 1978–1993 and recipient of the Georgia 4-H Lifetime Achievement Award
- Wayne Shackelford, Former Georgia Commissioner of Transportation and recipient of the Georgia 4-H Lifetime Achievement Award
- Tommy Walton, University of Georgia State 4-H Leader 1955-1980.
- Herschel Walker NFL running back 1986-1997, winner of the 1982 Heisman Trophy
- Paul Wood, President of Georgia EMC
- Waco O'Guin, co-creator of MTV's Stankervision, Brickleberry and The DAMN! Show
- Trisha Yearwood, multi-platinum and multi-Grammy Award winning country music artist from Monticello. Her father was a county agent as well.

== Notes ==
- 1 Cong. Rec. (1955)
- Hunt, Ed (1987). The Georgia Home of 4-H Club Work
- Knight, Richie (2004). Newton County 4-H, Not Just Our Favorite Past Time
