= University of Georgia College of Agricultural and Environmental Sciences =

Environmental science college of the University of Georgia

Coordinates: 33.94740°N 83.37378°W

- Type: Public agricultural college
- Established: 1859
- Parent institution: University of Georgia
- Dean: Nick T. Place
- Students: 2,294
- Undergraduates: 1,471
- Postgraduates: 1,524
- Doctoral students: 422
- Location: Athens, Georgia, United States
- Website: www.caes.uga.edu
- Information current as of February 2026.

The UGA College of Agricultural and Environmental Sciences (CAES) is one of 18 colleges at the University of Georgia, a public land-grant research university in Athens, Georgia.

== History ==
CAES was founded in 1859 by the University of Georgia Board of Trustees as part of a complete reorganization of the university. The UGA Cooperative Extension Service was founded in 1914 to take research-based agricultural information from the university into Georgia communities. In 1918, CAES became the first college at the University of Georgia to accept women.

CAES has three main campuses: Athens, Tifton, and Griffin. All three campuses are home to various academic programs, research stations, and Extension programs.

Today, CAES is the No. 8 public university in the United States for agricultural sciences. UGA Extension serves each of Georgia's 159 counties with in-county agents specializing in agriculture and natural resources, family and consumer sciences, and 4-H. UGA Extension administers Georgia's largest youth program, Georgia 4-H.

== Departments ==
- Agricultural and applied economics
- Agricultural leadership, education and communication
- Animal and dairy science
- Crop and soil sciences
- Entomology
- Food science and technology
- Horticulture
- Plant pathology
- Poultry science

== Majors ==
- Agribusiness
- Agricultural education
- Agricultural and applied economics
- Agricultural and environmental science communication
- Agriscience and environmental systems
- Animal biosciences
- Animal health
- Animal and dairy science
- Applied biotechnology
- Avian biology
- Biological science
- Entomology
- Environmental economics and management
- Environmental resource management
- Food science
- Honors interdisciplinary studies
- Horticulture
- Hospitality and food industry management
- Poultry science
- Regenerative bioscience
- Turfgrass management
