= Tybee Post Theater =

Movie theater in Georgia, United States

Coordinates: 32.01498°N 80.84287°W

Tybee Post Theatre
- entrance to the Post Theatre
- Interactive map of Tybee Post Theatre
- Former names: Beach Theatre
- Location: 10 Van Horne Ave, Tybee Island, GA 31328

Construction
- Groundbreaking: 1930
- Cost: $20,000

Website
- www.tybeeposttheater.org

Tybee Post Theater is a movie theatre located on Tybee Island, Georgia, United States. It was constructed in 1930 by the military for the local fort Fort Screven. Following the Second World War, it was abandoned by the military. After laying dormant for 40 years, the Friends of Tybee Theatre revitalized it and it continues to be used today. The Tybee Post Theater is one of the few building used by the U.S. Army during its operation of Fort Screven to be accessible by the public.

== History ==
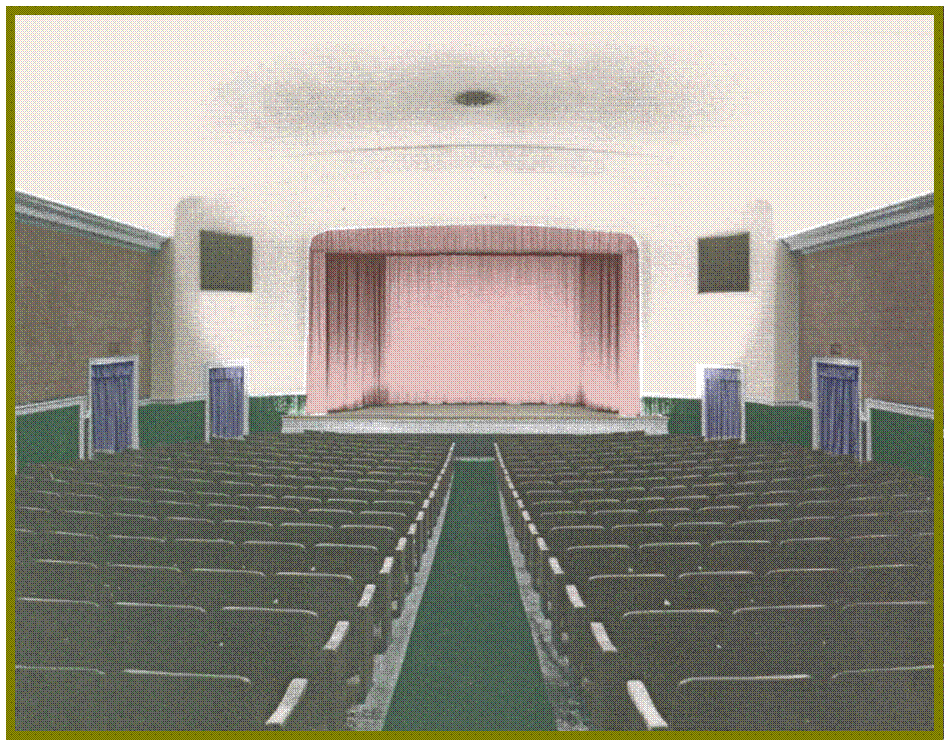
Original interior.

The Post Theatre was one of the first theaters in Georgia to have sound features (called “talkies”) and was the highlight of recreational activities for the local Fort Screven. Because the theater was built by the Army, the blueprints for the theater were one of several standardized designs. The Post Theater has a Greek Revival style facade and is similar in design to theaters at Fort Benning, Georgia and Fort Hancock, New Jersey. The interior was originally Streamline Moderne.

After Fort Screven was decommissioned, the Post Theater was sold to private owners and became the Beach Theater. From the 1940s through the 1960s locals and tourists alike enjoyed movies at the Beach. At the end of the sixties the theatre was discarded and closed. For a brief time it served as a sail loft and was later gutted in anticipation of development into condominiums. The building then stood vacant and open to the elements for over 20 years. In 2006 the theater was purchased by the Friends of the Tybee Theater, a 501 C-3 non-profit corporation staffed by many volunteers and a few paid staffers.

== Restoration ==
Through a combination of private and government funds, a restoration plan has been completed. Phase 1 of restoration, a new roof and securing of the building, was accomplished in 2009. The Tybee Post Theater was the first Georgia project to receive a grant funded by specialized license plates. The $20,000 so garnered was applied to replacing the theater's doors and windows. The now named Tybee Post Theater is becoming the cultural arts center for Tybee Island and the surrounding community featuring all types of live entertainment, movies and arts activities.
