= Burton 4-H Center =

Education center in Georgia, U.S.

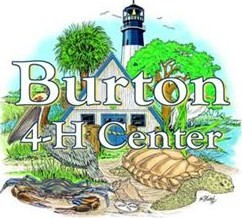
- Established: 1946
- Research type: Environmental Education
- Director: Paul Coote
- Location: 9 Lewis Avenue, Tybee Island, Georgia, 31328-9751, United States; 32.010569°N 80.847337°W
- Campus: 6 acres (24,000 m^{2})
- Operating agency: University of Georgia
- Website: http://burton4h.org/

The Burton 4-H Center is one of five 4-H centers in Georgia, United States. It offers both day programs and one-week residential programs. Students from all over Georgia attend the Burton 4-H Center which specializes in marine science education. In addition to providing typical 4-H classes in applied science, the Burton 4-H Center has achieved substantial community recognition for sea turtle conservation and rescue. The center maintains a regionally specific collection of coastal maritime species including Carolina diamondback terrapins, bearded dragons, gopher tortoises, oyster toad fish, and clear-nose skates. The center has been recognized for supporting numerous community service projects such as beach clean-ups. It also hosts operation purple camp (OPC) during the summer. OPC is a camp for children who have parents actively serving in the armed forces.

== Classes ==
Many classes offered at the Burton 4-H Center make use of the local natural resources, especially marshes, sand dunes, ocean inlets as well as the historical resources including Spanish Civil War Batteries and the Tybee Island lighthouse.

== Summer camp ==
The summer camp that takes place every summer at Burton 4-H Center is organized under Georgia 4-H Program. It lasts from 6 to 8 weeks depending upon camper registration and the year. Campers arrive on Monday and return home on a Friday. The schedule changes each day of the week during camp season.

Schools from all over the state participate in the summer camp program at Burton 4-H Center.

== Environmental education ==
The Environmental Education program (EE) at Burton 4-H Center is the equivalent to a shortened version of the camping program. The 2 biggest differences are that the EE sessions range from 1 day to 3 days and they take place during the school year. The main objective of EE is to educate the public. This is why there are more classes and they last longer during the EE season. The major areas focused on in the curriculum at Burton 4H Center include but are not limited to the environment, thinking skills, and history. The Environmental Education program in Georgia serves an average of 35,000 students a year, making it the largest in the nation. Each center has an area of environmental education that they specialize in. Burton 4-H Center specializes in regional wildlife and history of the surrounding area.

== Sea turtle release ==
On August 7, 2008, a captive loggerhead sea turtle named Squirty was released into the Atlantic Ocean by the Burton 4-H Center. The turtle had been rescued as a hatchling and raised at the center since he was one week old. "Squirty," as he came to be known, was the only survivor of a vandalized nest of turtle eggs. Unable to find his way to the ocean, he was raised in a large aquarium for two years at the center. In honor of Squirty's release, a festival was held all around the release area, and hundreds of people participated. News crews followed Squirty around until his departure to freedom. Burton 4-H Center was commended by the community for their efforts.
