= Tybee Island, Georgia =

City and barrier island in Georgia, United States

- City
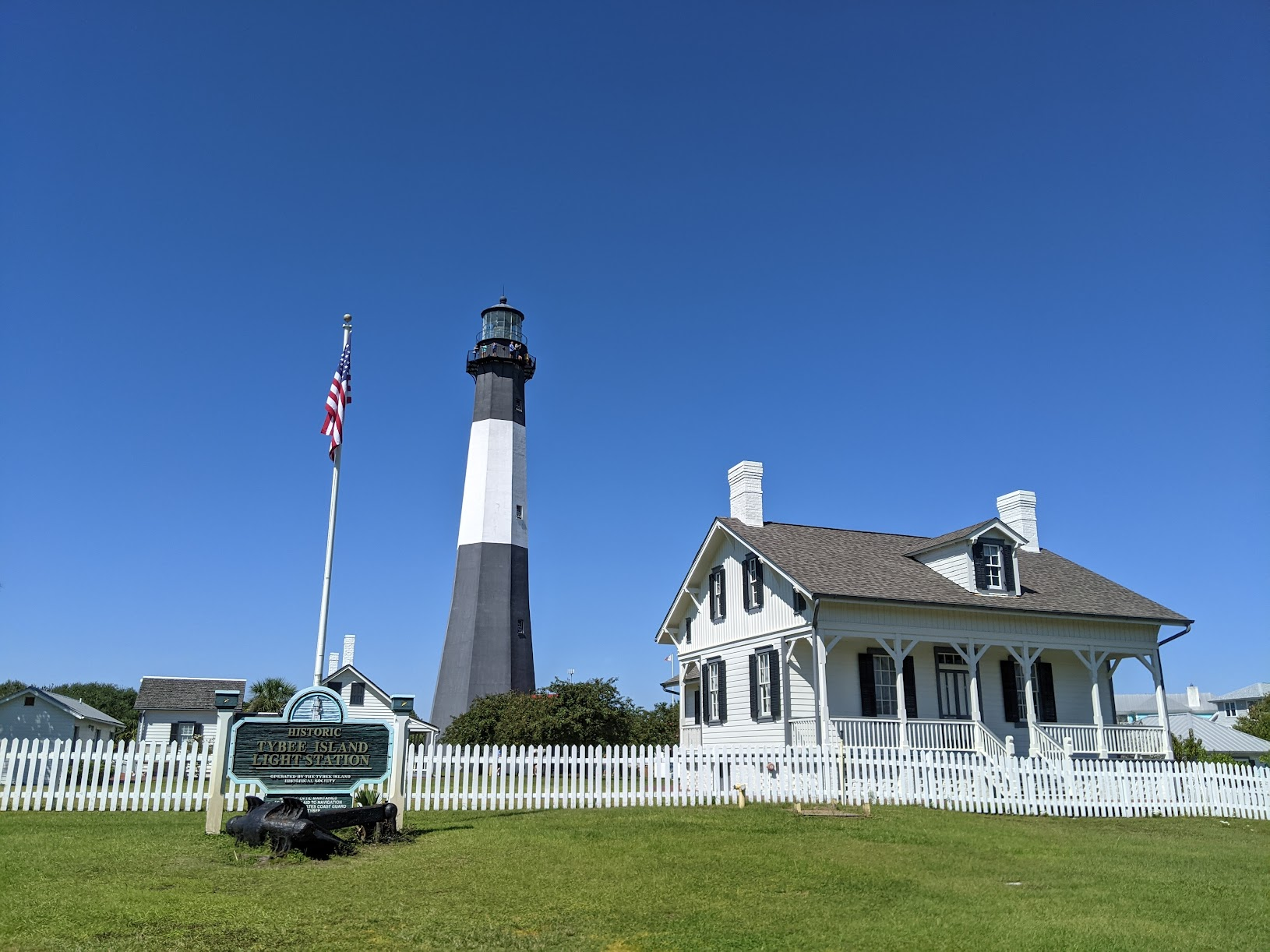
- Tybee Island Lighthouse

- Seal

- Location in Chatham County and the state of Georgia
- Coordinates: 32°00′27″N 80°50′42″W
- Country: United States
- State: Georgia
- County: Chatham

Government
  - Mayor: Brian West

Area
  - Total: 3.19 sq mi (8.25 km^{2})
  - Land: 2.88 sq mi (7.46 km^{2})
  - Water: 0.31 sq mi (0.79 km^{2})
- Elevation: 10 ft (3.0 m)

Population (2020)
  - Total: 3,114
  - Density: 1,080.6/sq mi (417.21/km^{2})
- Time zone: UTC−5 (Eastern (EST))
  - Summer (DST): UTC−4 (EDT)
- ZIP Code: 31328
- Area code: 912
- FIPS code: 13-78036
- GNIS feature ID: 0333294
- Website: cityoftybee.org

Tybee Island (/ˌtaɪbi/ TYE-bee) is a city and a barrier island in Chatham County, Georgia, 18 miles (29 km) east of Savannah. The name is used for both the city and the island, but geographically the two are not identical: only part of the island's territory lies within the city, while the rest is unincorporated.

The island is Georgia's easternmost point. The phrase "From Rabun Gap to Tybee Light", intended to illustrate Georgia's geographic diversity, contrasts the mountain pass near the state's northernmost point with the coastal barrier island's lighthouse.

As of the 2020 census, the city's population was about 3,000 people. The entire island is a part of the Savannah metropolitan statistical area.

Officially renamed Savannah Beach in a publicity move in 1929, the City of Tybee Island reverted to its original name in 1978. The small island, which has long been a quiet beach getaway for Savannah residents, has become a popular vacation spot for visitors from outside the Savannah area. Tybee Island is home to the first of what eventually became the Days Inn chain of hotels, the oft-photographed Tybee Island Light Station, and the Fort Screven Historic District.

On February 5, 1958, the U.S. Air Force accidentally dropped an atomic bomb into the sea off Tybee Island due to an accidental collision between two aircraft. Although the "Tybee Bomb" did not detonate (the nuclear weapon was an inert, simulated nuclear capsule according to some reports, while others have claimed the nuclear capsule was equipped), there has been ongoing concern because the Mark 15 nuclear bomb lost during the mishap was never recovered.

== History ==
Native Americans, using dugout canoes to navigate the waterways, hunted and camped in Georgia's coastal islands for thousands of years. The Euchee tribe likely inhabited the island in the years preceding the arrival of the first Spanish explorers in the area in the 16th century. Tybee is the Euchee word for "salt".

In 1520, the Spanish laid claim to what is now Tybee Island and named it Los Bajos. It was at the northern end of the Guale missionary province of Spanish Florida. During that time the island was frequented by pirates who used the island to hide from those who pursued them. Pirates later used the island's inland waterways for a fresh water source. After the founding of South Carolina in 1670, warfare increased between the English and their pirate allies and the Spanish and their Native American allies. In 1702, James Moore of South Carolina led an invasion of Spanish Florida with an Indian army and a fleet of militia-manned ships. The invasion failed to take the capital of Florida, St. Augustine, but did destroy the Guale and Mocama missionary provinces. After another invasion of Spanish Florida by South Carolina in 1704, the Spanish retreated to St. Augustine and Pensacola; the Sea Islands were depopulated, allowing the establishment of new English settlements such as the colony of Georgia.

=== Lighthouse ===
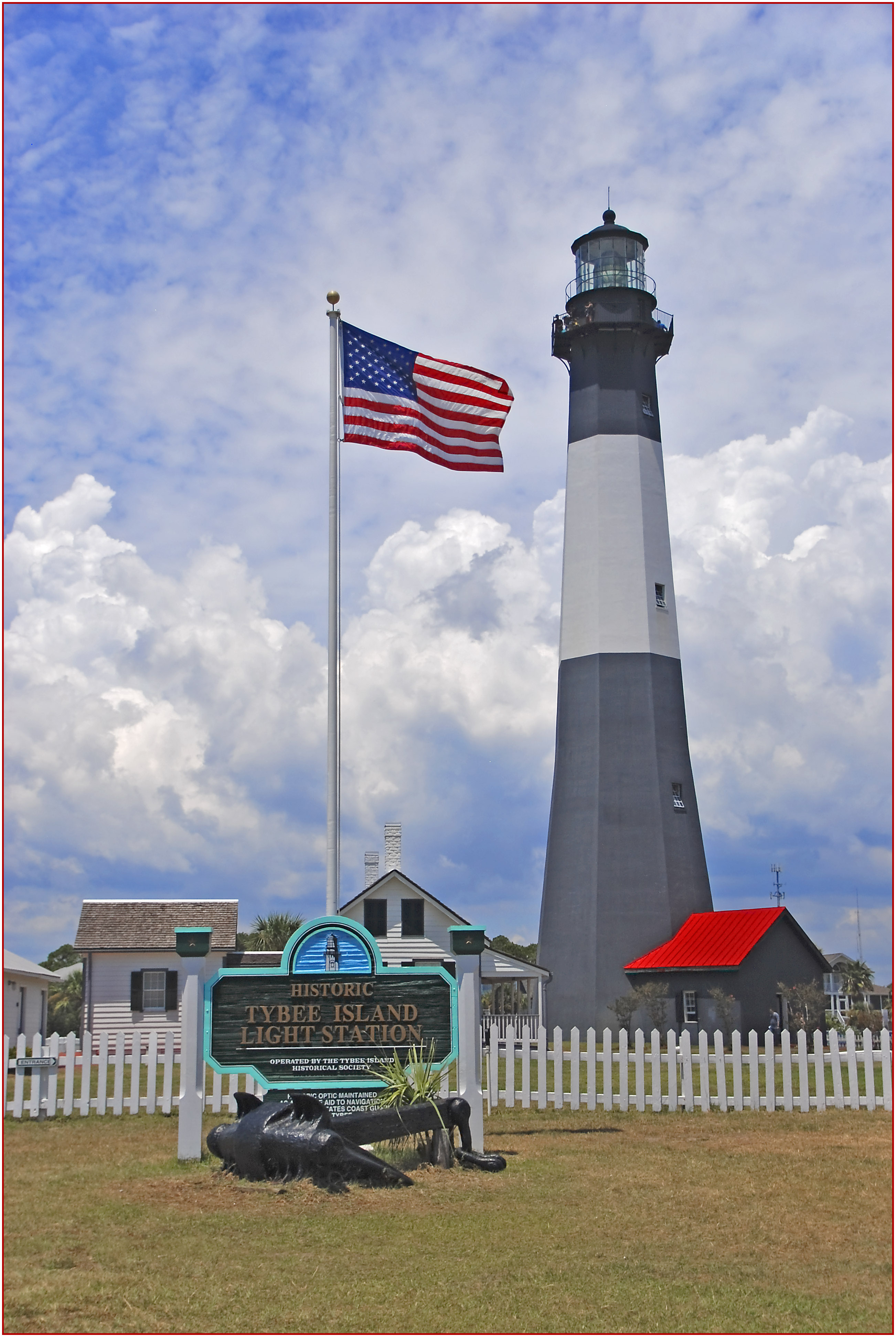
Tybee Island Light Station

Tybee Island's strategic position near the mouth of the Savannah River has made the island's northern tip the ideal location for a lighthouse since Georgia's early settlement period. First built in 1736, the lighthouse was made of brick and wood, and stood 90 feet (27 m) tall, making it the highest structure in America at that time. The original lighthouse has been replaced several times. The second lighthouse was built in 1742 when beach erosion threatened the first. Part of the third lighthouse at the site, built in 1773, still stands as the bottom 60 feet (18 m) of the present lighthouse. The top 94 feet (29 m) of the current lighthouse were added in 1867.

Today, the Tybee Lighthouse is a popular tourist destination, having all of its support buildings on the 5-acre (20,000 m^{2}) site historically preserved. The current black-and-white tower markings are a reversion to its fourth day mark, first used in 1916. The Tybee Island Light Station is one of just a handful of 18th-century lighthouses still in operation in North America.

=== Civil War ===
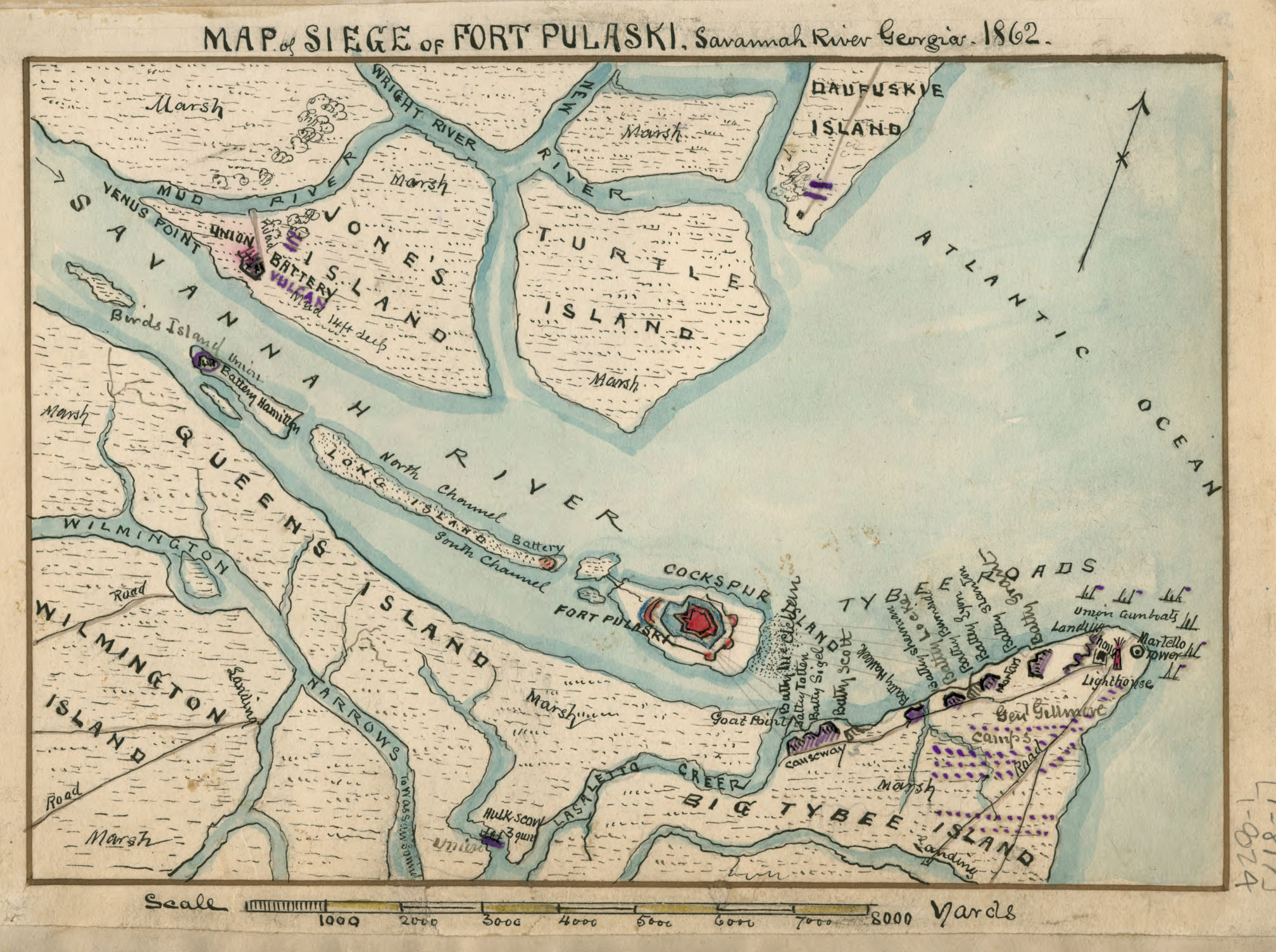
Robert K. Sneden map showing Union batteries on Tybee Island

During the Civil War, the Union Army placed siege batteries along the north coast of Tybee Island that aided in their successful bombardment and capture of Fort Pulaski on April 10–11, 1862. This was the first significant use of rifled cannons against masonry fortifications and demonstrated that masonry fortifications were obsolete. Recently, the City of Tybee Island has taken action to commemorate Tybee's historic significance in the Civil War. In 2005, the city obtained a federal grant to acquire two tracts of land where Union soldiers launched their attack against Fort Pulaski.

=== Fort Screven historic district ===
Fort Screven was first commissioned in 1898 and named for brigadier general James Screven, who was killed in action near Midway, Georgia, in 1778 during the American Revolutionary War. The fort served as a valuable part of coastal defense until it was decommissioned in 1947. Fort Screven is most notable for one of its former commanding officers, General of the Army George C. Marshall, later the architect of the Marshall Plan that helped rebuild Western Europe after World War II. Approximately 70 fort buildings still remain. The entire Fort Screven district was placed on the National Historic Register in 1982. One of the most important remaining structures is the Tybee Post Theater, constructed in 1930. It was one of Georgia's first theaters to have sound features and was the highlight of the fort's recreational activities. Other remaining buildings include the recently restored guard house, the bakery (now a private home), and barracks (now apartments). The ruins of the beach fortifications are also extant, and of the six original batteries, Battery Garland (built in 1899) is accessible to the public. Battery Garland houses the Tybee Museum. Another remaining area is Officer's Row, a group of original homes with a sweeping ocean view, one of which is now a bed and breakfast.

=== Resort period ===
During the late 19th century, at the height of the Industrial Revolution, residents in large, polluted cities frequently sought out remote beaches for summertime getaways. Clear, saltwater breezes were thought to be remedies for numerous ailments, including asthma and certain allergies. Steamships began carrying patients and tourists to Tybee Island just after the Civil War. In 1887, the Central of Georgia Railway completed a rail line to Tybee Island from downtown Savannah, opening the island to waves of summertime visitors. The railroad built the Tybrisa Pavilion in 1891, and by the end of the decade, several hundred summer cottages dotted the island's Atlantic coast.

In the 1920s, U.S. Route 80 was completed, connecting Tybee Island via road with the mainland. The Tybrisa Pavilion became a popular stop for big band tours and performers included Bing Crosby, Tommy Dorsey, and Blue Steele. The pavilion also housed a bowling alley and roller skating rink. Development continued to push toward the island's southern tip. By 1940, the island had four hotels, including the Desoto Hotel and Hotel Tybee, and numerous smaller lodges. The Tybrisa Pavilion burned down in 1967, and was replaced by the Tybee Pier and Pavilion in 1996.

Cecil B. Day opened the first Days Inn on Tybee Island in 1970.

=== Tybee Bomb ===
On February 5, 1958, a U.S. Air Force B-47 Stratojet from Homestead Air Force Base, Florida, jettisoned a nuclear weapon (specifically, a Mark 15 hydrogen bomb) off the coast of Tybee Island while conducting training exercises with a USAF F-86 Sabrejet. The aircraft collided, with the pilot of the fighter ejecting and the crew of the bomber making an emergency landing at nearby Hunter Air Force Base. The lost weapon, known popularly as the "Tybee Bomb", remained a security concern for several years, although the Air Force claims the bomb lacks a nuclear capsule and poses no serious threat. In 2004, retired U.S. Air Force lieutenant Colonel Derek Duke took part in a private search for the bomb. According to an article in the Savannah Morning News, Duke found that there were "high levels of radiation and unusual magnetometer readings" at a specific point in the Wassaw Sound, just off the Tybee coast. He concluded from these readings that the bomb might be present "at a point just off the southern tip of Little Tybee", an undeveloped barrier island adjacent to Tybee Island. In response, the Air Force launched a nine-month search for the Tybee bomb in 2004. The search team specifically investigated the area of the Wassaw Sound where Duke had found high radiation levels. The Air Force reported to the media in 2005 that the source of the high radiation was likely monazite, a mineral naturally high in radiation. The Morning News headline at the time said, "Duke Found Dirt".

=== Shark attacks ===
On June 15, 2016, the Tybee city council voted 4–1 to withhold shark attack numbers where the attacks did not result in loss of life. According to the Savannah Morning News, the vote was a direct result of pressure from local businesses that had seen a decline in tourism due to recent reported shark activity.

== Geography ==
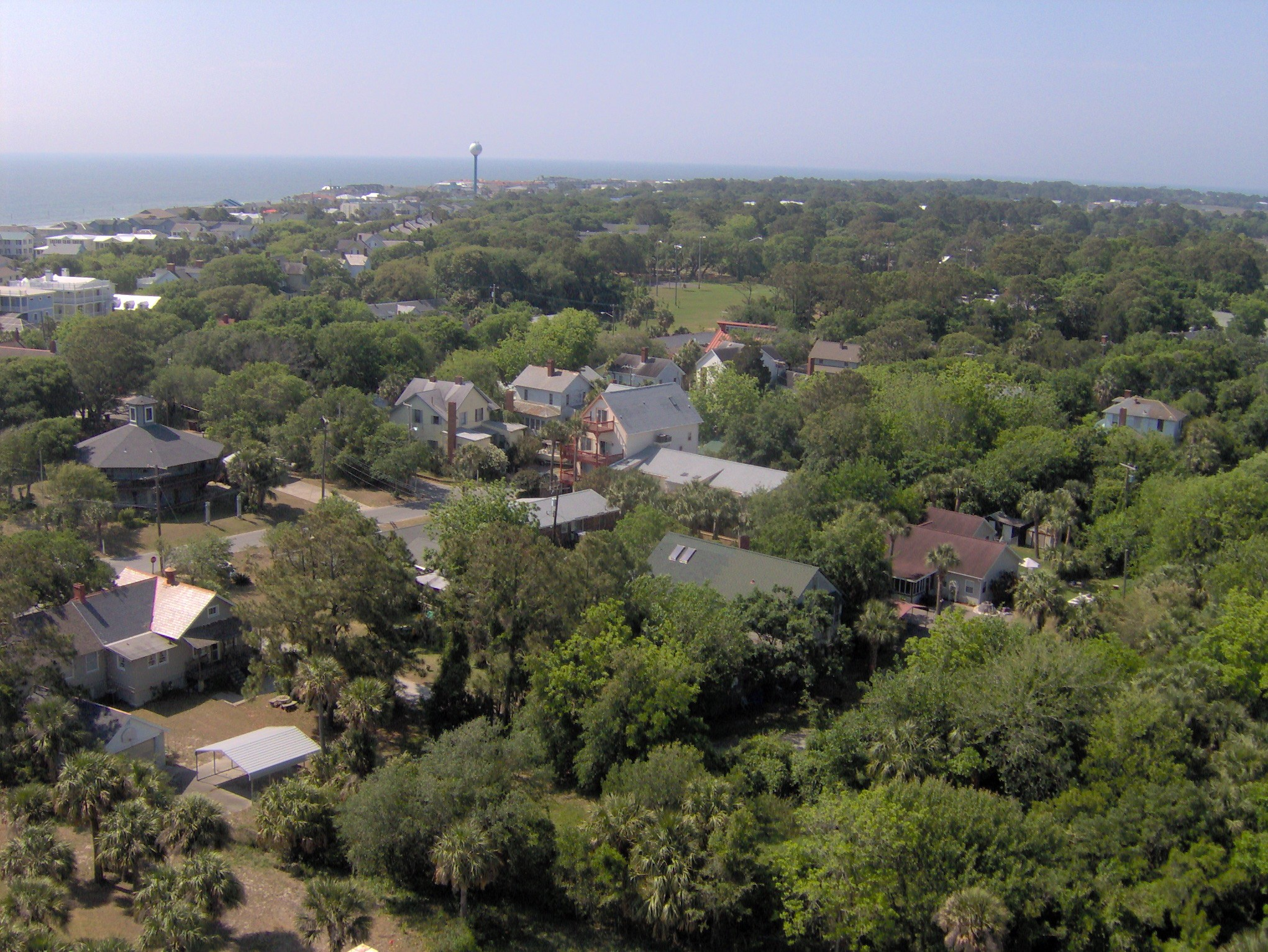
The view south from atop the Tybee Lighthouse

Tybee Island is located at 32°0′24″N 80°50′58″W (32.006672, -80.849374). The island is the north easternmost of Georgia's Sea Islands, which comprise the outer section of the state's Lower Coastal Plain region. Like the other Sea Islands, Tybee consists of a sandy beach on its eastern shore and a tidal salt marsh on its western shore. The interior consists of a maritime forest (the density of which has been reduced by development) and freshwater sloughs.

The Savannah River empties into the Atlantic Ocean just north of Tybee Island, placing the island in a strategic location. To the west, the marsh-lined Lazaretto Creek splits the island off from McQueens Island (the 2-mile (3 km) stretch between the main western shore of Tybee Island and Lazaretto Creek is mostly marshland). Tybee Creek flows along the south shore of Tybee Island and joins the Atlantic at the island's southeastern tip. Little Tybee Island, which consists mostly of protected wetlands, lies across Tybee Creek to the southwest. The size of the sandy beach at the southern tip of Tybee Island varies considerably in response to tidal changes.

According to the United States Census Bureau, the city has an area of 5.2 miles (8.3 km), of which 3.7 miles (6.0 km) is land and 1.4 miles (2.3 km), or 27.2%, is water. The entire island (as distinguished from the city of the same name) has a land area of 21.871 square miles (56.65 km^{2}).

=== Climate ===
Tybee Island has hot weather in summer, while in winter the weather is cool with winds. The temperature typically varies from 45 °F to 88 °F and is rarely below 33 °F or above 93 °F. The below table shows the monthly average temperatures:

Date	Average low	Average high	Record low	Record high	Average precipitation	Average snow
January	40 °F	60 °F	4 °F (1985)	85 °F (1985)	4.37"	0.1"
February	43 °F	63 °F	15 °F (1958)	84 °F (1986)	3.3"	0"
March	49 °F	69 °F	21 °F (1980)	90 °F (1963)	3.78"	0"
April	55 °F	75 °F	32 °F (1989)	95 °F (1986)	3.24"	0"
May	63 °F	82 °F	37 °F (1963)	99 °F (1986)	2.95"	0"
June	71 °F	86 °F	45 °F (1997)	101 °F (1986)	5.07"	0"
July	74 °F	89 °F	50 °F (1968)	107 °F (1986)	6.15"	0"
August	73 °F	88 °F	53 °F (1986)	103 °F (1954)	8.23"	0"
September	69 °F	84 °F	46 °F (1967)	98 °F (1985)	5.84"	0"
October	59 °F	77 °F	32 °F (1976)	97 °F (1986)	3.78"	0"
November	50 °F	70 °F	23 °F (1970)	88 °F (1961)	2.68"	0"
December	43 °F	62 °F	10 °F (1983)	83 °F (1984)	3.13"	0"

== Demographics ==
Historical population
Census	Pop.	Note	%±
1900	381		—
1910	786		106.3%
1920	117		−85.1%
1930	202		72.6%
1940	644		218.8%
1950	1,036		60.9%
1960	1,385		33.7%
1970	1,786		29.0%
1980	2,240		25.4%
1990	2,842		26.9%
2000	3,392		19.4%
2010	2,990		−11.9%
2020	3,114		4.1%
U.S. Decennial Census

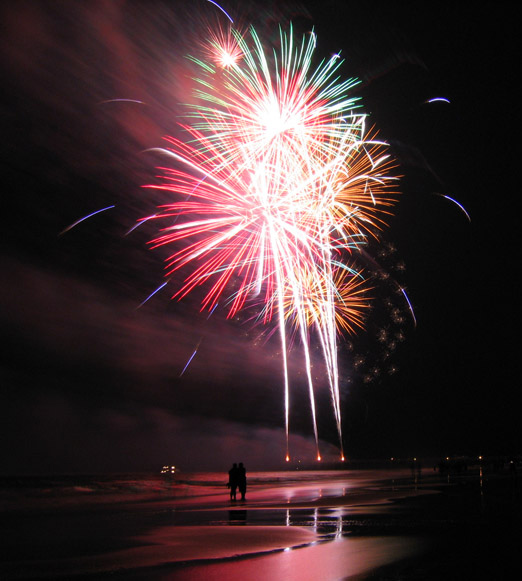
The Tybee Island pier's annual fireworks show

=== 2020 census ===
As of the 2020 census, Tybee Island had 3,114 residents, 1,500 households, and 831 families. The median age was 60.5 years. 8.9% of residents were under age 18 and 38.4% were age 65 or older. For every 100 females, there were 85.6 males, and for every 100 females age 18 and over, there were 83.9 males.

96.3% of residents lived in urban areas, while 3.7% lived in rural areas.

Of the city's households, 14.3% had children under age 18. Of all households, 47.7% were married-couple households, 18.8% were households with a male householder and no spouse or partner present, and 27.9% were households with a female householder and no spouse or partner present. About 34.0% of all households were made up of individuals, and 18.6% had someone living alone who was age 65 or older.

There were 2,994 housing units, of which 49.9% were vacant. The homeowner vacancy rate was 3.2%, and the rental vacancy rate was 48.6%.

Tybee Island racial composition as of 2020
Race	Num.	Perc.
White (non-Hispanic)	2,859	91.81%
Black or African American (non-Hispanic)	27	0.87%
Native American	15	0.48%
Asian	37	1.19%
Pacific Islander	3	0.1%
Other/Mixed	112	3.6%
Hispanic or Latino	61	1.96%

== Crime rate ==
Tybee's violent crime rate is lower than Georgia's but its property crime rate is higher. The table below shows the rate of crime per 100,000 people.

Statistic	Tybee Island_{/100k people}	Georgia_{/100k people}	National_{/100k people}
Murder	0.0	6.6	5.3
Rape	0.0	34.0	40.4
Robbery	32.0	118.4	102.8
Assault	96.0	238.5	248.5
Violent crime	128	398	386
Burglary	192.1	614.4	468.9
Theft	3,713.2	2,130.1	1,745.0
Vehicle theft	96.0	259.9	236.9
Property crime	4,001	3,005	2,451

== Events ==
Every year since 1987, Tybee Island has had a Beach Bum parade, traditionally held in May the weekend before Memorial Day weekend. The parade route comes down Tybee's main road, Butler Avenue, and when parade floats come by onlookers have been known to shoot each other with water guns.

Tybee Pirate Fest, which began in 2005, is typically held the weekend before Columbus Day.

Tybee Island was formerly home to "Orange Crush," an annual beach party attracting thousands of students from historically Black colleges and universities. The 2019 event was canceled after an organizer was arrested, and future events were moved to Jacksonville Beach, Florida, with organizers citing "lack of resources, limited parking, civil rights violations, and political injustices." The event returned to Tybee Island for the 2025 season.

== Education ==
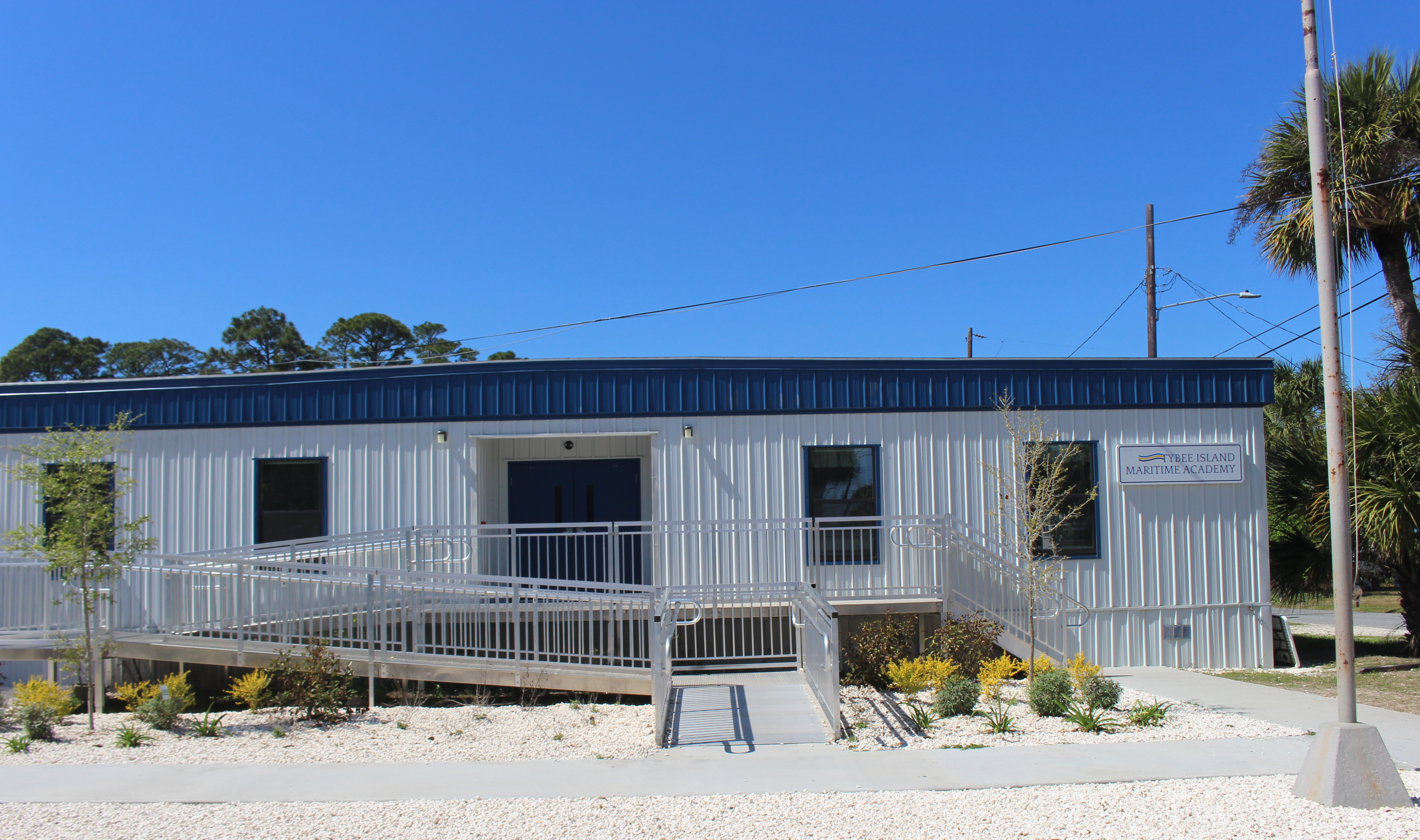
Tybee Island Maritime Academy

Tybee Island is part of the Savannah-Chatham County Public School System. In the 2009-10 school year, there were approximately 34,668 students in the district.

There is also a public charter school on the island.

== Photo gallery ==
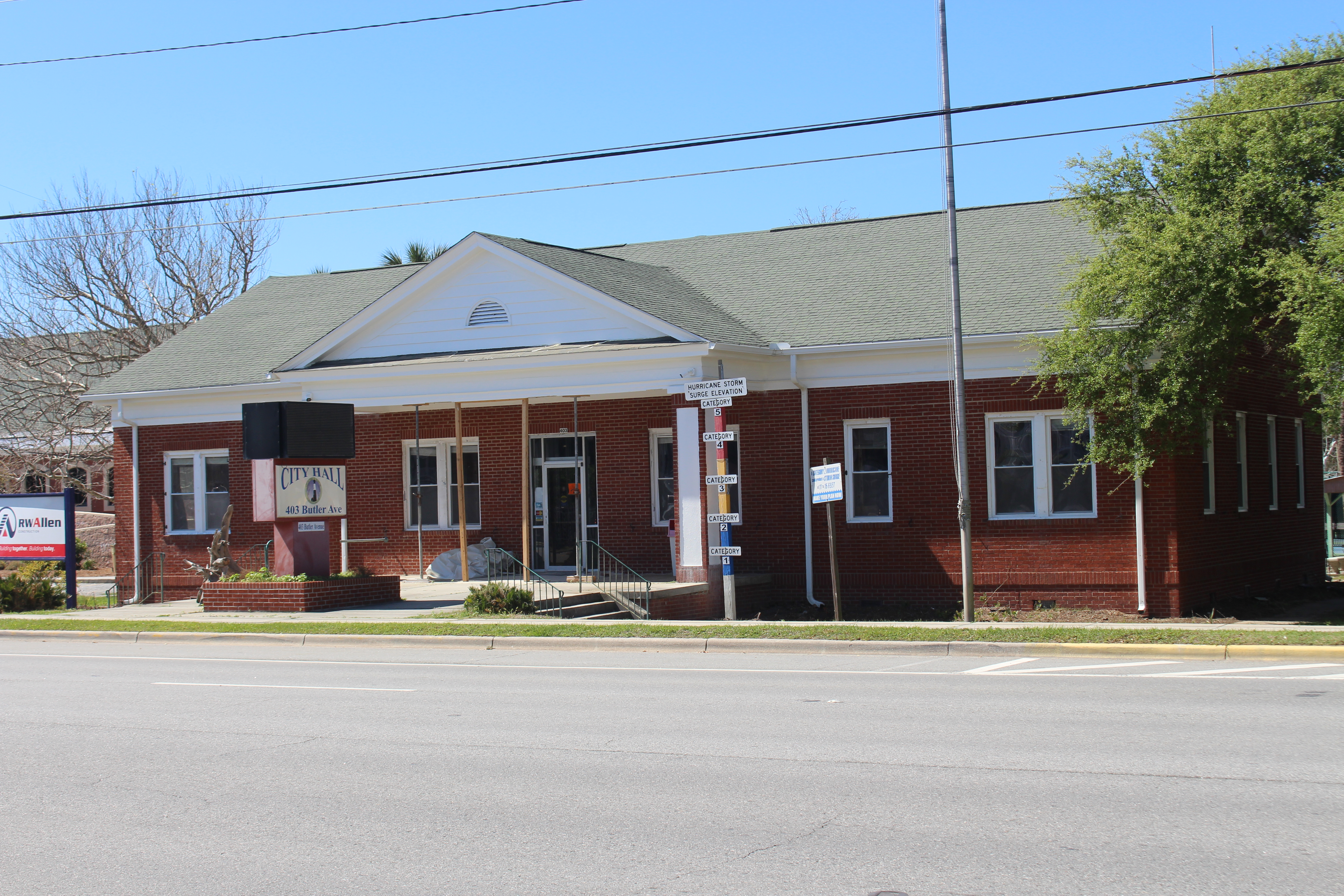
City Hall

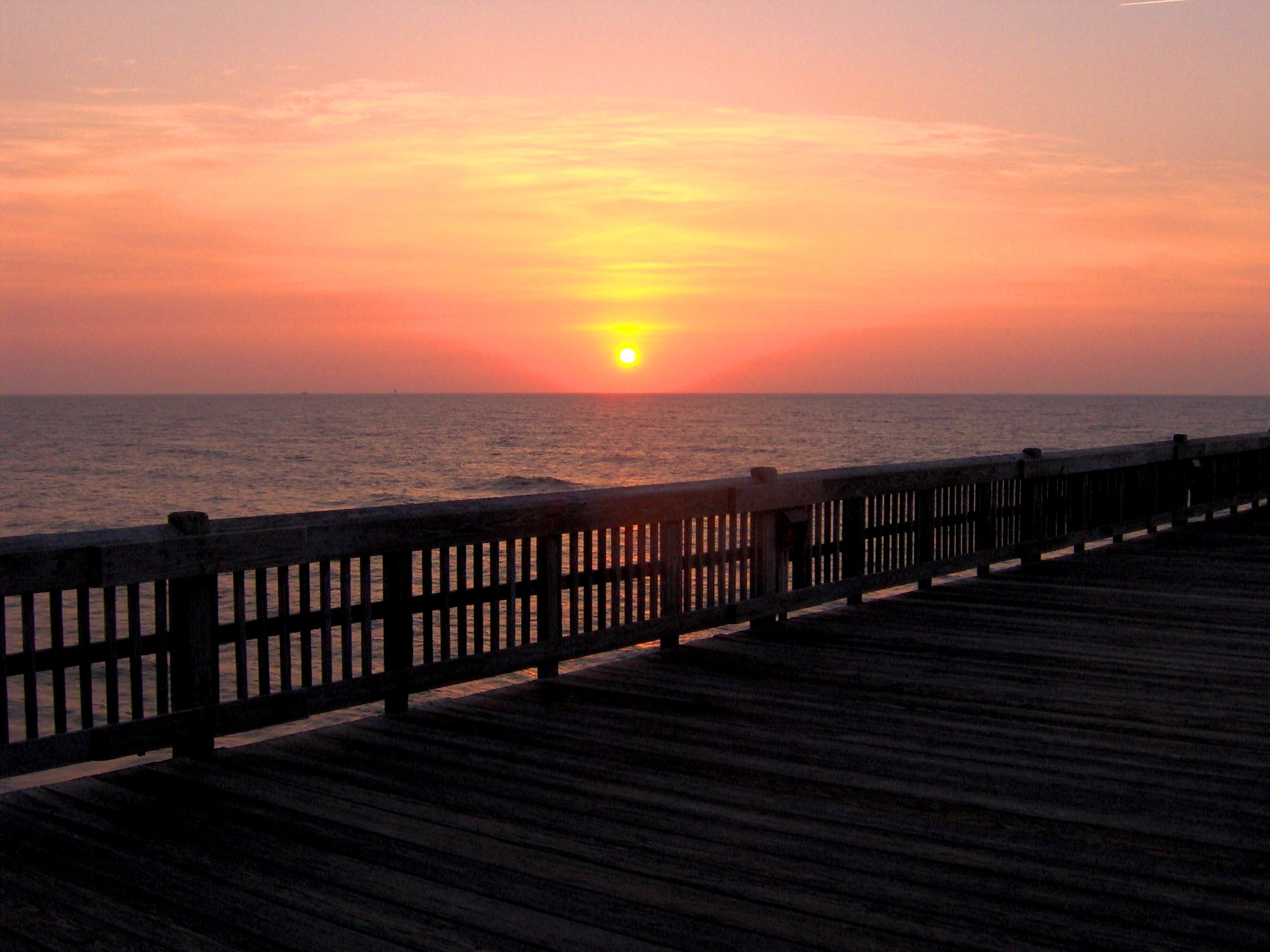
Sunrise from the Tybee Pier

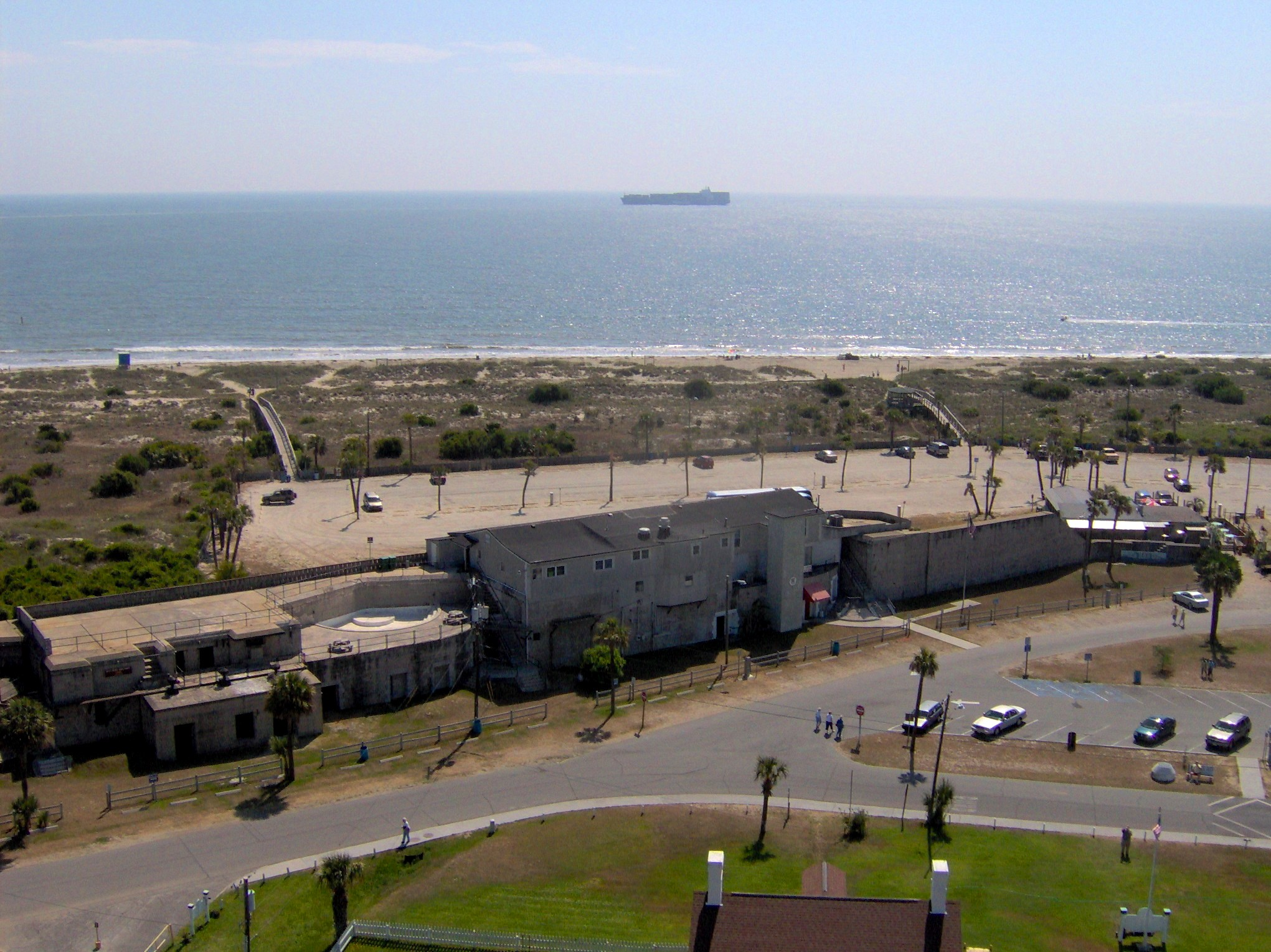
Fort Screven and the North Beach, viewed from the Tybee Lighthouse

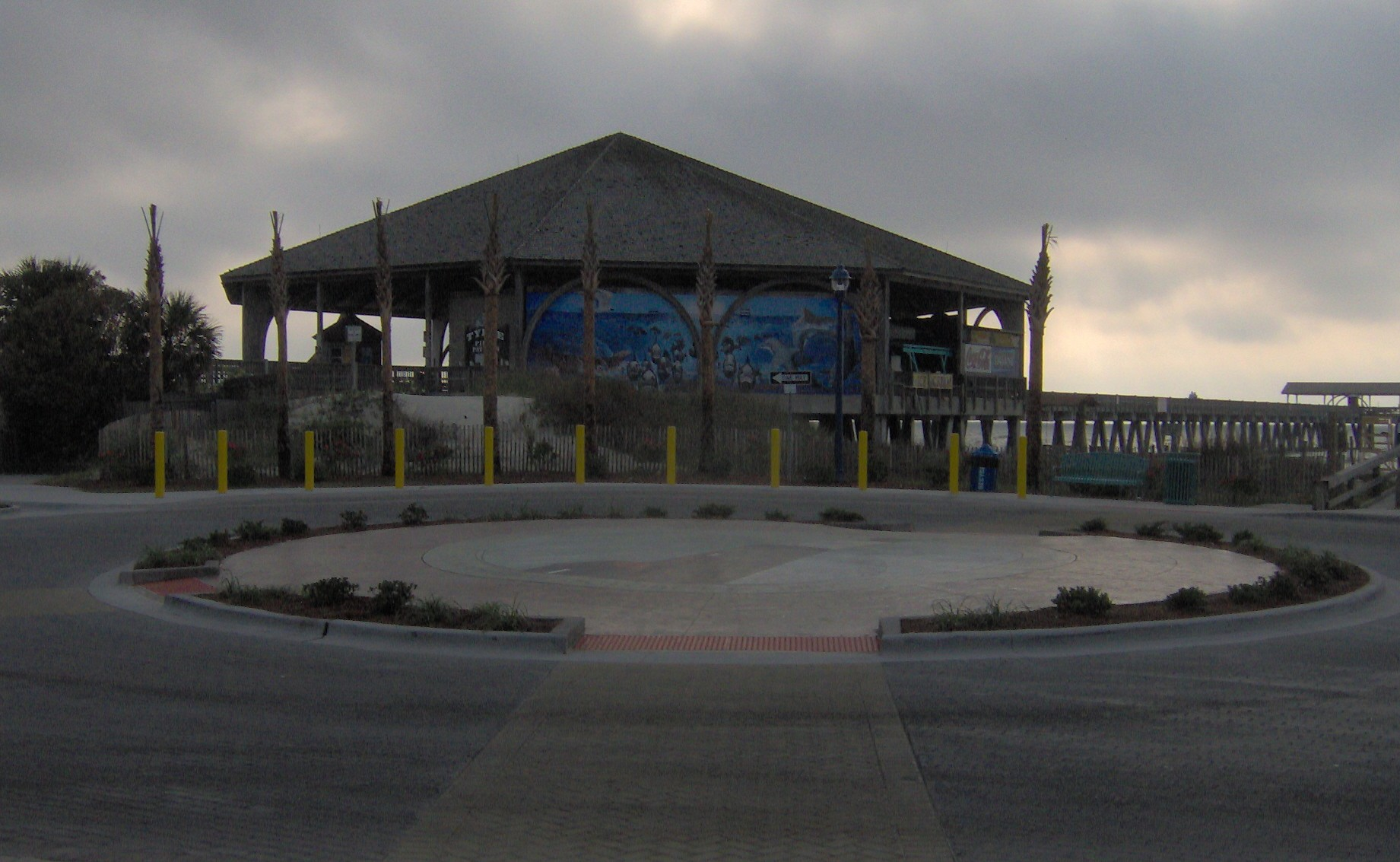
Tybee Pier and Pavilion

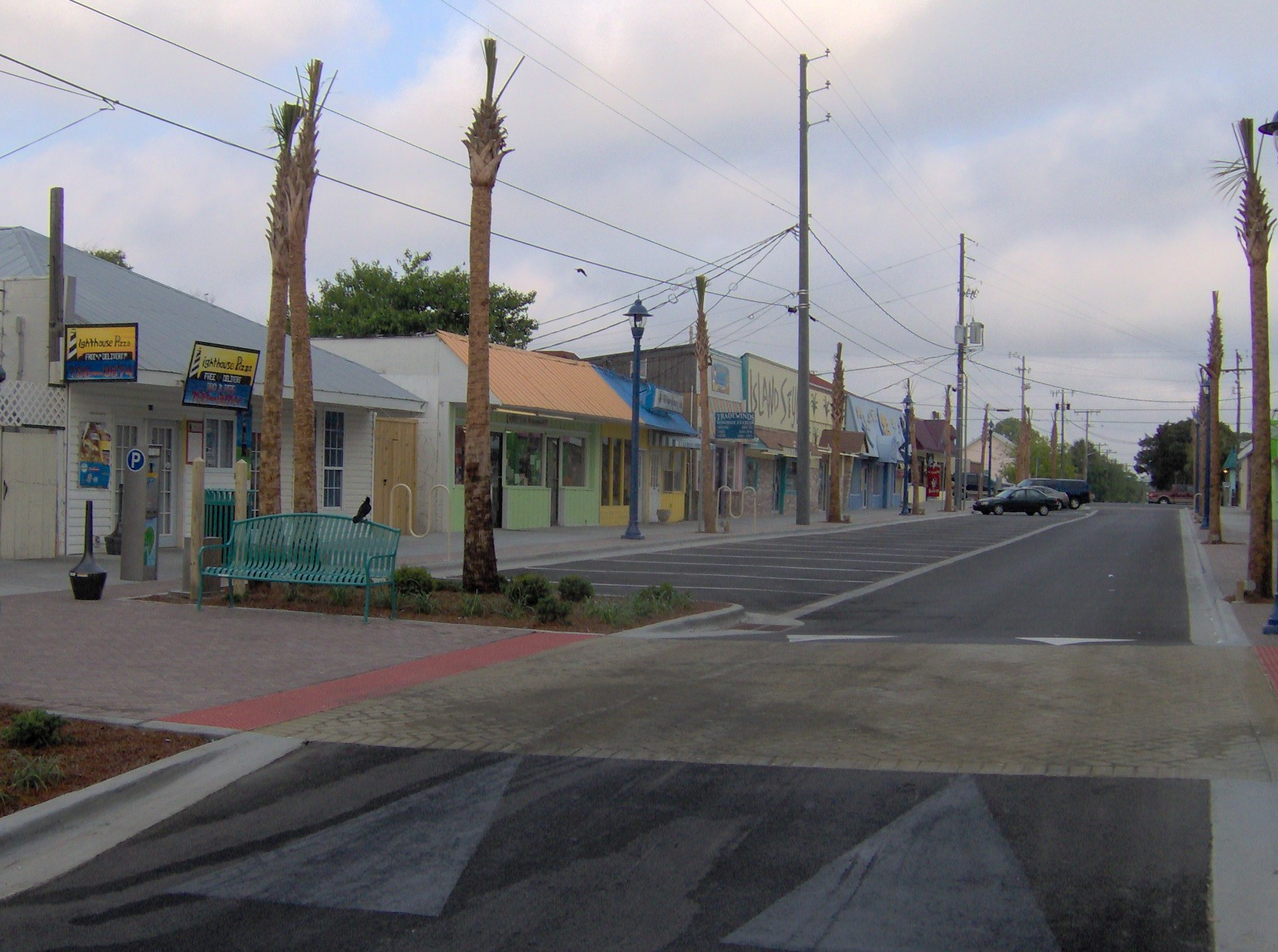
Tybrisa Street

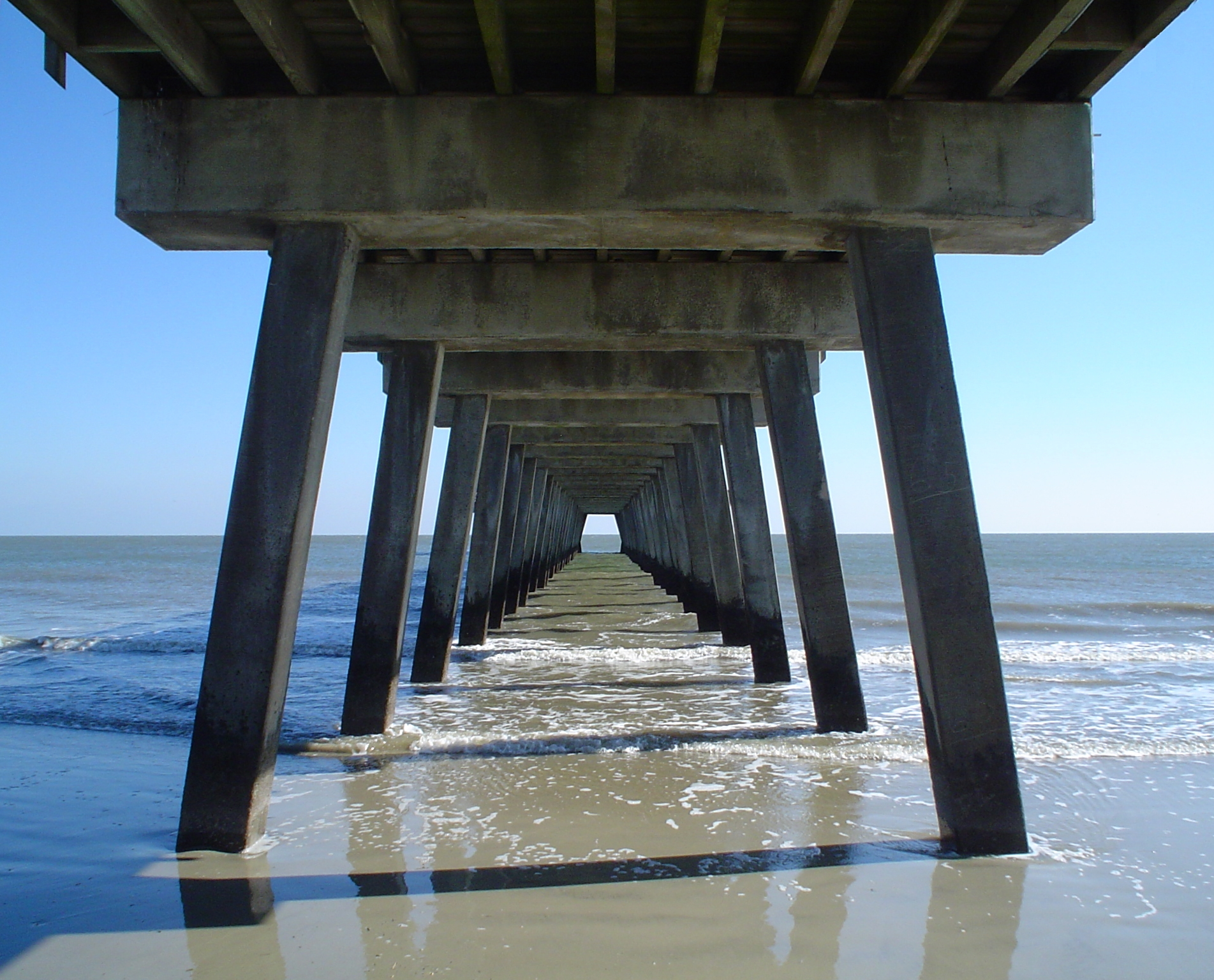
Tybee Island Pier in Savannah, Georgia

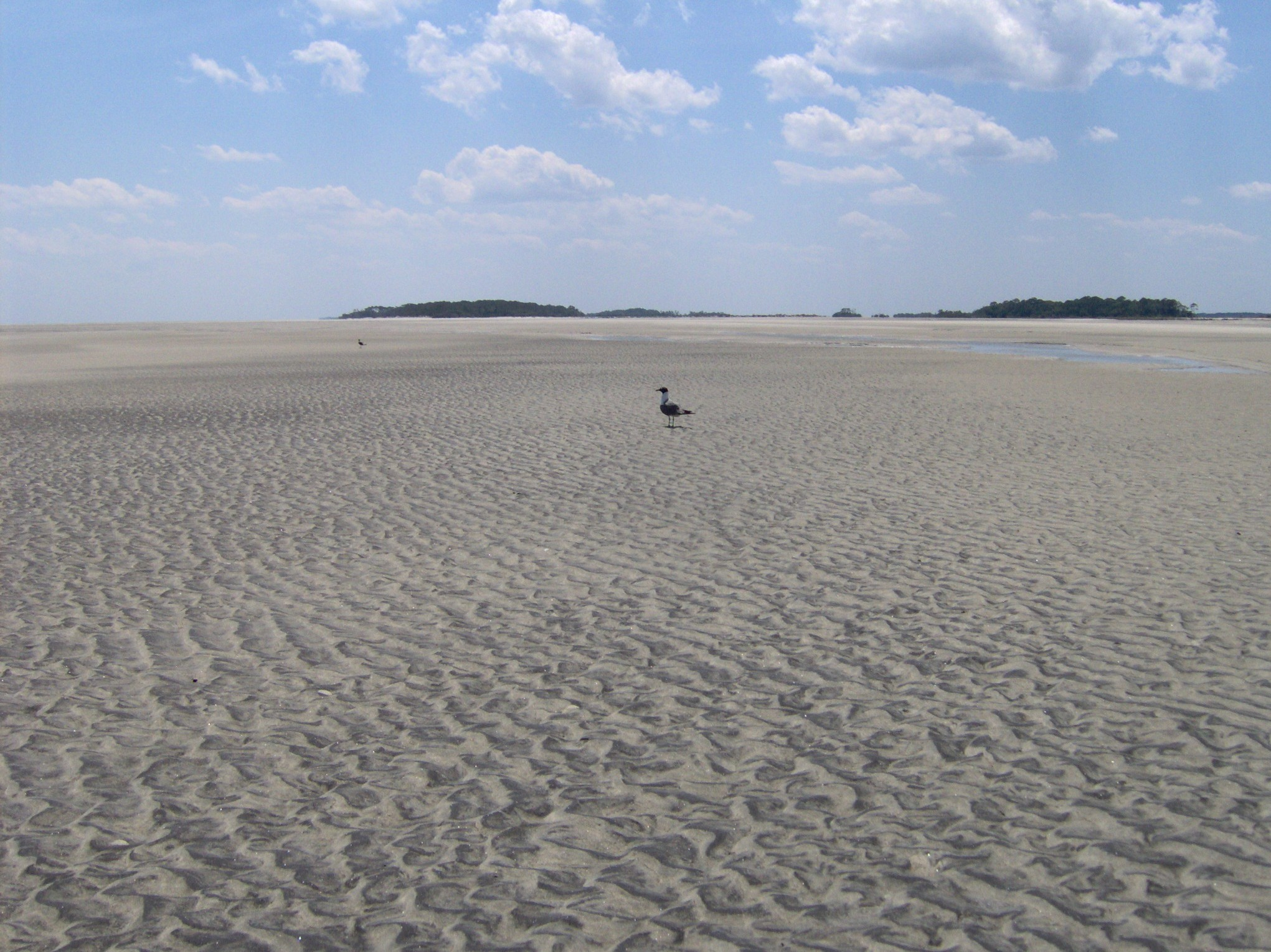
The south tip of Tybee Island at low tide

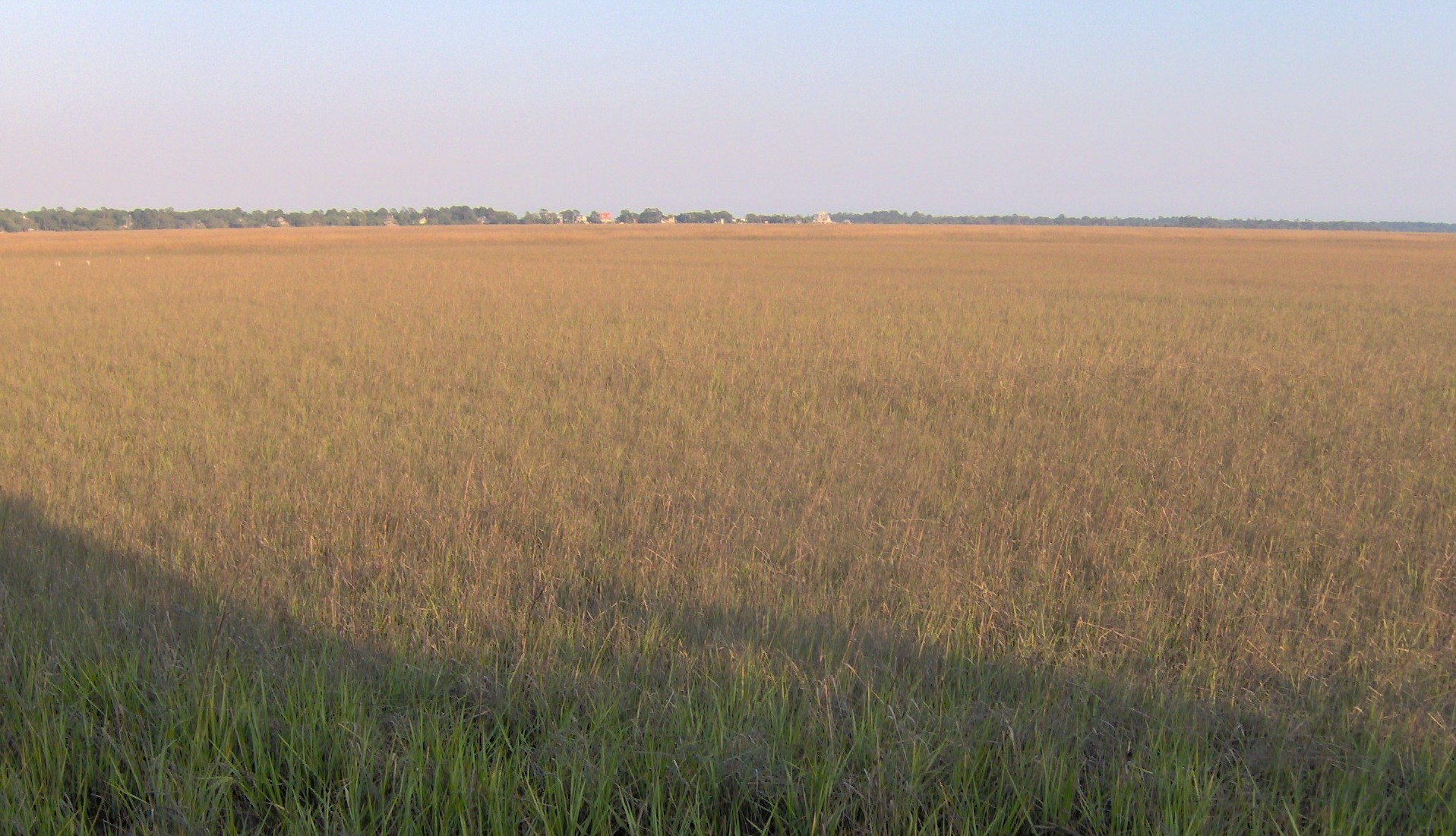
Lazaretto Marsh, off the western shore of Tybee Island

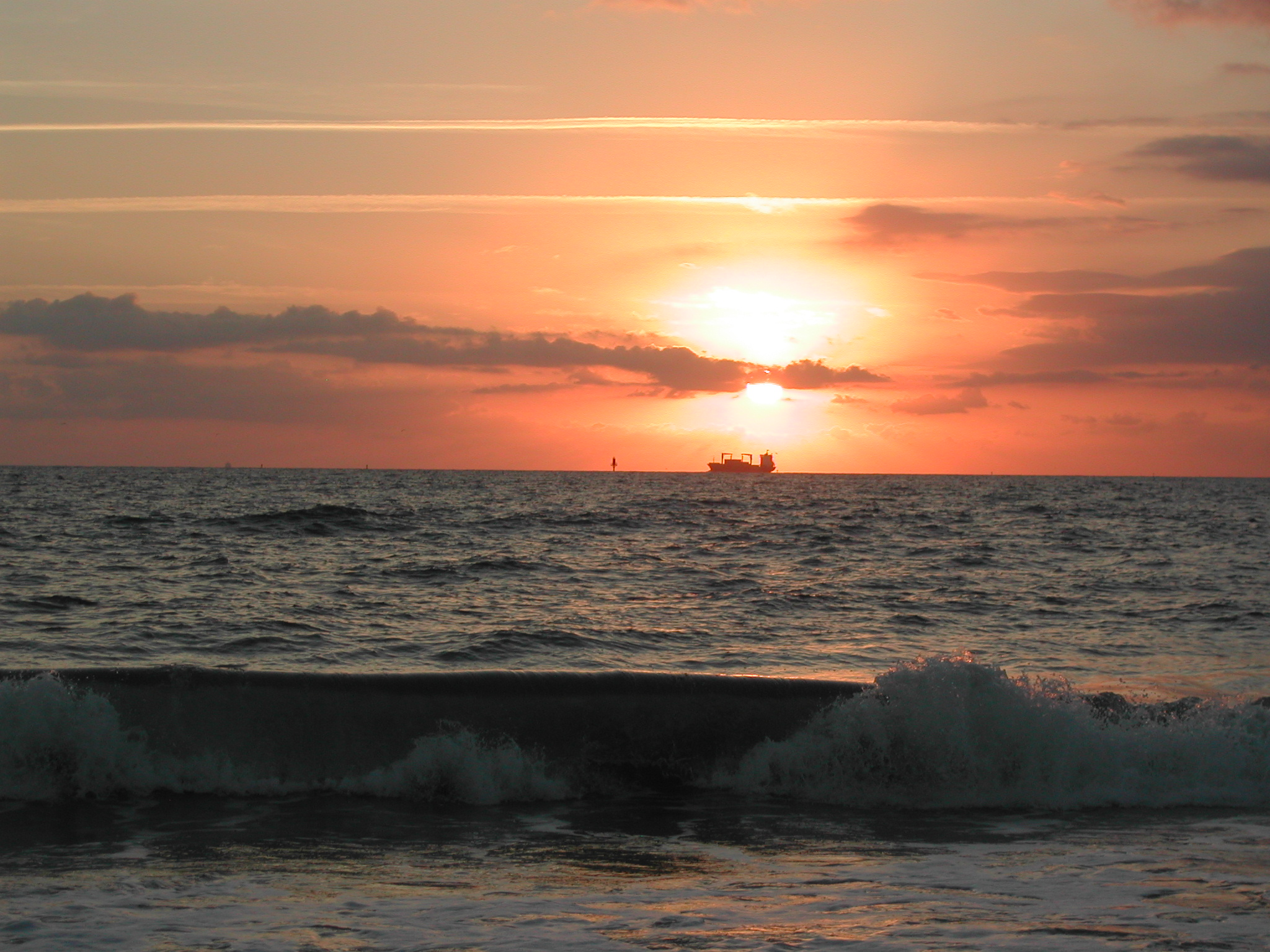
Sunrise over north beach

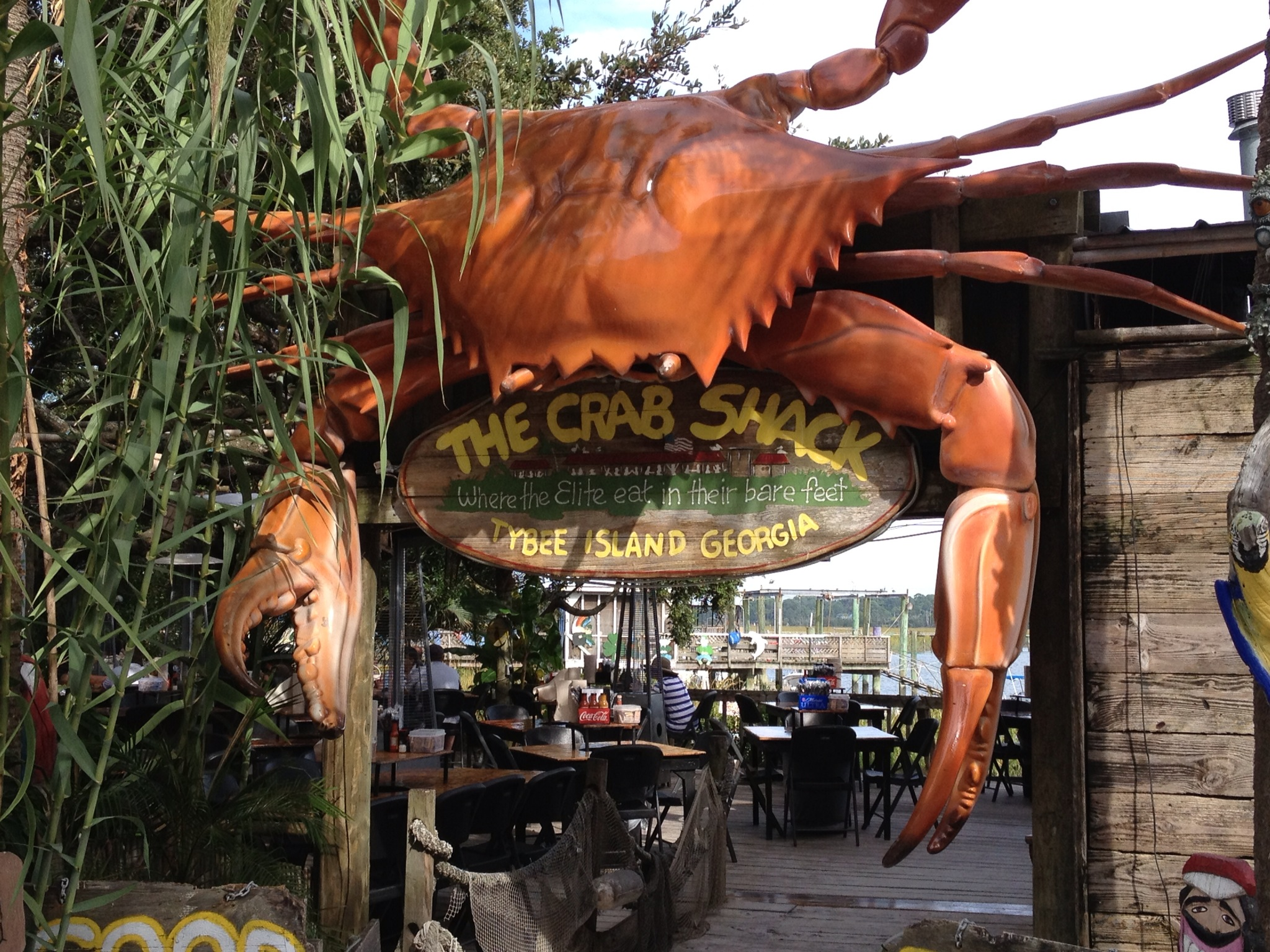
Entrance to The Crab Shack, a popular spot on Tybee Island

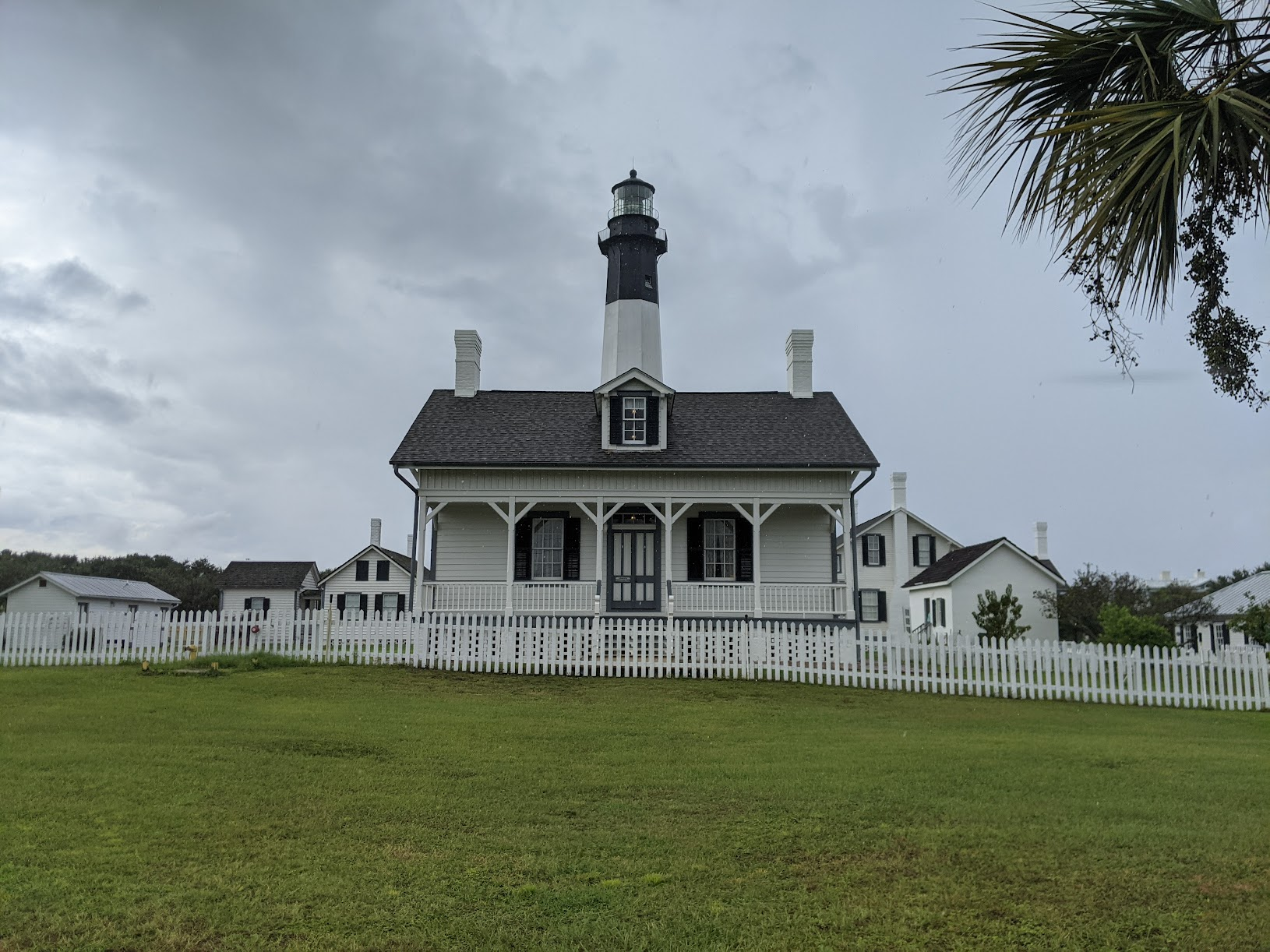
The light and keeper's cottage

== See also ==
- Burton 4-H Center
- Battle of Fort Pulaski
- Henry C. Walthour, former owner of part of the island
