= National Register of Historic Places listings in Chatham County, Georgia =

Location of Chatham County in Georgia

This is a list of properties and districts in Chatham County, Georgia that are listed on the National Register of Historic Places (NRHP).

This National Park Service list is complete through NPS recent listings posted July 10, 2026.

== Current listings ==
| | Name on the Register | Image | Date listed | Location | City or town | Description |
|---|---|---|---|---|---|---|
| 1 | Edmund and Mildred Abrahams Raised Tybee Cottage | Edmund and Mildred Abrahams Raised Tybee Cottage | January 27, 2020 (#100004900) | 4 Eighth St. 32°00′13″N 80°50′36″W | Tybee Island | |
| 2 | Ardsley Park-Chatham Crescent Historic District | Ardsley Park-Chatham Crescent Historic District | August 15, 1985 (#85001787) | Roughly bounded by Ardsley Pk., Chatham Crescent, Bull St., Baldwin Pk. and Ardmore; 32°02′50″N 81°05′42″W | Savannah | |
| 3 | Atlantic Greyhound Bus Terminal | Atlantic Greyhound Bus Terminal | December 13, 2016 (#16000837) | 109 Martin Luther King, Jr. Blvd. 32°04′47″N 81°05′51″W | Savannah | Now houses The Grey Bar & Restaurant |
| 4 | Bethesda Home for Boys | Bethesda Home for Boys | September 12, 1973 (#73000614) | S of Savannah at Ferguson Ave. and Bethesda Rd. 31°57′34″N 81°05′43″W | Savannah | |
| 5 | Bonaventure Cemetery | Bonaventure Cemetery | February 2, 2001 (#01000035) | Bonaventure Rd., 1 mi. N of US 80; 32°02′38″N 81°02′44″W | Savannah | |
| 6 | Bordley Cottage-Beach View House | Bordley Cottage-Beach View House | June 27, 2014 (#14000345) | 1701 Butler Ave. 31°59′27″N 80°51′01″W | Tybee Island | |
| 7 | The Carbo House | The Carbo House | May 21, 2010 (#10000273) | 9 Tybrisa St. 31°59′31″N 80°50′53″W | Tybee Island | Weekly boarding as of 2016 |
| 8 | Carver Village Historic District | Carver Village Historic District | January 24, 2019 (#100003340) | Bounded by W. Gwinnett & Endley Sts., Allen Blun, & Collat Aves. 32°04′16″N 81°07′35″W | Savannah | |
| 9 | Central of Georgia Depot and Trainshed | Central of Georgia Depot and Trainshed | December 8, 1976 (#76000610) | Martin Luther King Jr Blvd (formerly W. Broad St.) and Liberty Sts. 32°04′34″N 81°05′57″W | Savannah | Currently the site of the Savannah History Museum |
| 10 | Central of Georgia Railroad: Savannah Shops and Terminal Facilities | Central of Georgia Railroad: Savannah Shops and Terminal Facilities | June 2, 1978 (#78000970) | Martin Luther King Jr Blvd (formerly W. Broad St.) and Railroad Ave. 32°04′33″N 81°06′05″W | Savannah | A National Historic Landmark and currently the home of the Georgia State Railroad Museum; expansion of the Central of Georgia Depot and Trainshed listing |
| 11 | Central of Georgia Railway Company Shop Property | Central of Georgia Railway Company Shop Property | March 5, 1970 (#70000199) | Between W. Jones St. and Louisville Rd. 32°04′37″N 81°05′56″W | Savannah | Now Clark Hall of the Savannah College of Art and Design |
| 12 | Charity Hospital | Charity Hospital | May 2, 1985 (#85000934) | 644 W. 36th St. 32°03′37″N 81°06′29″W | Savannah | Now Heritage Place Apartments |
| 13 | CSS Georgia (ironclad) | CSS Georgia (ironclad) | February 10, 1987 (#86003746) | At the bottom of the Savannah River; 32°05′05″N 81°02′09″W | Savannah | |
| 14 | Cuyler-Brownville Historic District | Cuyler-Brownville Historic District | February 13, 1998 (#98000028) | Roughly bounded by Anderson Ln., W. 31st St., Montgomery St., Victory Dr., Ogeechee Rd., and Hopkins St. 32°03′30″N 81°06′29″W | Savannah | |
| 15 | Daffin Park-Parkside Place Historic District | Daffin Park-Parkside Place Historic District | May 12, 1999 (#99000554) | Bounded by Victory Dr., Waters Ave., Bee St. and 51st Street Ln. 32°02′37″N 81°04′55″W | Savannah | |
| 16 | Isaiah Davenport House | Isaiah Davenport House | September 22, 1972 (#72000374) | 324 E. State St. 32°04′38″N 81°05′18″W | Savannah | |
| 17 | Drayton Tower | Drayton Tower | October 16, 2013 (#13000826) | 102 E. Liberty St. 32°04′29″N 81°05′31″W | Savannah | Originally named the Drayton Arms Apartments |
| 18 | Drouillard-Maupas House | Drouillard-Maupas House | May 13, 1991 (#91000558) | 2422 Abercorn St. 32°03′11″N 81°05′56″W | Savannah | |
| 19 | Dutton-Waller Raised Tybee Cottage | Dutton-Waller Raised Tybee Cottage | July 24, 2008 (#08000711) | 1416 7th Ave. 31°59′44″N 80°51′13″W | Tybee Island | |
| 20 | Eastside Historic District | Eastside Historic District | November 7, 2002 (#02001292) | Roughly bounded by E. Broad (now MLK Blvd), Cedar, Gwinnett and Anderson Sts. 32°03′36″N 81°05′03″W | Savannah | |
| 21 | Eureka Club-Farr's Point | Eureka Club-Farr's Point | July 8, 2009 (#09000491) | 2326 East Blvd. on Wilmington Island; 31°58′18″N 81°00′01″W | Savannah | |
| 22 | Fairway Oaks-Greenview Historic District | Fairway Oaks-Greenview Historic District | March 31, 2009 (#09000184) | Bounded approximately by DeRenne Drive, Waters Avenue, Truman Parkway, and Casey Canal, and the Live Oaks Golf Course; 32°01′15″N 81°05′31″W | Savannah | |
| 23 | Federal Building and U.S. Courthouse | Federal Building and U.S. Courthouse | June 7, 1974 (#74000663) | Wright Sq. 32°04′41″N 81°05′35″W | Savannah | |
| 24 | First Bryan Baptist Church | First Bryan Baptist Church | May 22, 1978 (#78000971) | 575 W. Bryan St. 32°04′55″N 81°05′57″W | Savannah | |
| 25 | First Federal Savings and Loan Association Headquarters | | April 3, 2026 (#100012880) | 132 East Broughton Street; 32°04′43″N 81°05′24″W | Savannah | |
| 26 | Fort James Jackson | Fort James Jackson | February 18, 1970 (#70000200) | Islands Expwy. 32°04′55″N 81°02′10″W | Savannah | National Historic Landmark |
| 27 | Fort Pulaski National Monument | Fort Pulaski National Monument | October 15, 1966 (#66000064) | 17 mi. W of Savannah, Cockspur Island; 32°01′41″N 80°53′50″W | Savannah | administered by the National Park Service |
| 28 | Fort Screven Historic District | Fort Screven Historic District | May 25, 1982 (#82002393) | Tilton, Butler, Van Horn, Railroad and Alger Aves., and Pulaski Rd. 32°01′24″N 80°51′00″W | Tybee Island | |
| 29 | Gordonston Historic District | Gordonston Historic District | October 11, 2001 (#01000741) | Roughly bounded by Skidaway Rd., Goebel Ave., Gwinnett St., and Pennsylvania Ave. 32°03′17″N 81°03′47″W | Savannah | |
| 30 | Green-Meldrim House | Green-Meldrim House | January 21, 1974 (#74000664) | Macon and Bull Sts. 32°04′26″N 81°05′41″W | Savannah | National Historic Landmark |
| 31 | Hill Hall at Savannah State College | Hill Hall at Savannah State College | April 23, 1981 (#81000197) | Savannah State College campus 32°01′27″N 81°03′23″W | Savannah | |
| 32 | W. B. Hodgson Hall | W. B. Hodgson Hall | March 25, 1977 (#77000413) | 501 Whitaker St. 32°04′13″N 81°05′49″W | Savannah | |
| 33 | Isle of Hope Historic District | Isle of Hope Historic District | September 7, 1984 (#84003874) | Roughly bounded by Skidaway River, Parkersburg Rd., Island, Cornus, and Noble Glen Drs. 31°58′49″N 81°03′21″W | Savannah | |
| 34 | J. Herbert and Julia Johnson Raised Tybee Cottage | J. Herbert and Julia Johnson Raised Tybee Cottage | May 21, 2008 (#08000441) | 1306 Jones Ave. 31°59′48″N 80°50′58″W | Tybee Island | |
| 35 | Kensington Park-Groveland Historic District | Kensington Park-Groveland Historic District | August 30, 2014 (#14000533) | Roughly bounded by DeRenne & Waters Aves., Abercorn & Johnston Sts. 32°01′24″N 81°06′12″W | Savannah | |
| 36 | Kiah Museum | | December 17, 2024 (#100011194) | 505 West 36th Street; 32°03′34″N 81°06′20″W | Savannah | |
| 37 | Laurel Grove-North Cemetery | Laurel Grove-North Cemetery | August 4, 1983 (#83000187) | W. Anderson St. 32°03′53″N 81°06′31″W | Savannah | |
| 38 | Laurel Grove-South Cemetery | Laurel Grove-South Cemetery | September 6, 1978 (#78000972) | 37th St. 32°03′37″N 81°06′57″W | Savannah | |
| 39 | Lebanon Plantation | Lebanon Plantation | November 29, 1979 (#79000704) | SW of Savannah; 32°00′22″N 81°12′38″W | Savannah | Private property, gated |
| 40 | Juliette Gordon Low Historic District | Juliette Gordon Low Historic District | October 15, 1966 (#66000276) | 10 Oglethorpe Ave., E., 330 Drayton St., 329 Abercorn St. 32°04′37″N 81°05′33″W | Savannah | National Historic Landmark, The district consists of three buildings associated with the origins of the Girl Scouts of the USA, the "Juliette Gordon Low Birthplace," the "Andrew Low House," and the "Andrew Low Carriage House". |
| 41 | Magnolia Park Historic District | | November 22, 2024 (#100009267) | Roughly bounded by DeRenne Ave., Latimer and Brogdon Sts., Lovett and Bacon Park Drs., Broadmoor Cir., and Truman Pkwy. 32°01′06″N 81°04′46″W | Savannah | |
| 42 | Massie Common School House | Massie Common School House | May 13, 1977 (#77000414) | 207 E. Gordon St. 32°04′13″N 81°05′33″W | Savannah | |
| 43 | Morgan-Ille Cottage | Morgan-Ille Cottage | July 24, 2008 (#08000713) | 703 2nd Ave. 32°00′19″N 80°50′44″W | Tybee Island | |
| 44 | Mulberry Grove Site | | July 17, 1975 (#75000575) | Address Restricted (305 S Coastal Hwy); 32°11′N 81°10′W | Port Wentworth | Left in ruins, reportedly only a marker was left and it is missing |
| 45 | Mulherin-Righton Raised Tybee Cottage | Mulherin-Righton Raised Tybee Cottage | April 29, 2008 (#08000349) | 14 8th Pl. 32°00′10″N 80°50′39″W | Tybee Island | |
| 46 | New Ogeechee Missionary Baptist Church | New Ogeechee Missionary Baptist Church | August 8, 2001 (#01000854) | 751 Chevis Rd. 31°58′40″N 81°14′57″W | Savannah | |
| 47 | Nicholsonville Baptist Church | Nicholsonville Baptist Church | May 22, 1978 (#78000969) | White Bluff Rd. 31°57′30″N 81°08′18″W | Nicholsonville | |
| 48 | Ossabaw Island | | May 6, 1996 (#96000468) | 7 mi. S of Savannah, bounded by the Atlantic Ocean, Bear R., Ogeechee R., and St. Catherine's Sound; 31°47′40″N 81°06′44″W | Savannah | |
| 49 | Owens-Thomas House | Owens-Thomas House | May 11, 1976 (#76000611) | 124 Abercorn St. 32°04′39″N 81°05′22″W | Savannah | National Historic Landmark |
| 50 | Pine Gardens Historic District | Pine Gardens Historic District | November 5, 2014 (#14000890) | Roughly bounded by Goebel Ave., Beech & Capitol Sts. 32°04′00″N 81°03′23″W | Savannah | |
| 51 | James and Odessa Rourke, Jr., Raised Tybee Cottage | James and Odessa Rourke, Jr., Raised Tybee Cottage | September 23, 2010 (#10000804) | 702 14th St. 31°59′49″N 80°51′10″W | Tybee Island | |
| 52 | St. Bartholomew's Church | St. Bartholomew's Church | June 17, 1982 (#82002391) | Chevis Rd. 31°58′13″N 81°14′42″W | Burroughs | |
| 53 | St. Philip AME Church | St. Philip AME Church | August 2, 1984 (#84000959) | 613 Martin Luther King Jr Blvd (formerly W. Broad St.); 32°04′13″N 81°06′05″W | Savannah | |
| 54 | Savannah and Ogeechee Canal | Savannah and Ogeechee Canal | August 11, 1997 (#97000814) | Roughly along I-95, between the Savannah and Ogeechee Rivers; 32°03′40″N 81°13′18″W | Chatham | |
| 55 | Savannah Beach Town Hall and Auditorium | Savannah Beach Town Hall and Auditorium | May 27, 2022 (#100007755) | 403 Butler Ave. 32°00′31″N 80°50′35″W | Tybee Island | |
| 56 | Savannah Historic District | Savannah Historic District | November 13, 1966 (#66000277) | Bounded by E. Broad, Gwinnett, and W. Broad Sts. and the Savannah River (Broad St. is now MLK Blvd); 32°04′28″N 81°05′30″W | Savannah | National Historic Landmark |
| 57 | Savannah Pharmacy and Fonvielle Office Building | | February 20, 2013 (#13000023) | 914-918 Martin Luther King, Jr. Blvd. 32°04′02″N 81°06′08″W | Savannah | Demolished in 2014 NPS |
| 58 | Savannah Powder Magazine | | February 3, 2025 (#100011426) | Ogeechee Road; 32°02′54″N 81°09′42″W | Savannah vicinity | |
| 59 | Savannah Victorian Historic District | Savannah Victorian Historic District | December 11, 1974 (#74000665) | Roughly bounded by Gwinnett, Price, Anderson, and Montgomery Sts.; also the area bounded by Gwinnett, Anderson and 31st Sts. 32°03′53″N 81°05′49″W | Savannah | Second set of boundaries represents a boundary increase of May 20, 1982 (refnum 82002392) |
| 60 | Savannah Water Works Pump House | Savannah Water Works Pump House | January 24, 2022 (#100007368) | 1204 West Gwinnett St. 32°04′18″N 81°06′49″W | Savannah | |
| 61 | William Scarbrough House | William Scarbrough House | June 22, 1970 (#70000201) | 41 Martin Luther King Jr Blvd (formerly W. Broad St.); 32°04′52″N 81°05′50″W | Savannah | National Historic Landmark, now houses the Ships of the Sea Maritime Museum |
| 62 | Sea View Apartments | Sea View Apartments | April 22, 2003 (#03000286) | 7 18th St. 31°59′21″N 80°50′57″W | Tybee Island | |
| 63 | Slotin Building | Slotin Building | March 24, 1983 (#83000188) | 101 Martin Luther King Jr Blvd (formerly W. Broad St.); 32°04′48″N 81°05′52″W | Savannah | Now Bergen Hall of the Savannah College of Art and Design |
| 64 | Springfield Terrace School | Springfield Terrace School | March 9, 2022 (#100007479) | 707 Hastings St. 32°04′24″N 81°06′57″W | Savannah | |
| 65 | Oliver Sturges House | Oliver Sturges House | July 14, 1971 (#71000271) | 27 Abercorn St. 32°04′45″N 81°05′24″W | Savannah | |
| 66 | Telfair Academy | Telfair Academy | May 11, 1976 (#76000612) | 121 Barnard St. 32°04′44″N 81°05′43″W | Savannah | National Historic Landmark |
| 67 | Thomas Square Streetcar Historic District | Thomas Square Streetcar Historic District | July 29, 1997 (#97000813) | Roughly bounded by Anderson Ln., 42nd St., Victory Dr., E. Broad St., and Martin Luther King, Jr. Blvd. 32°03′28″N 81°05′56″W | Savannah | |
| 68 | Two Pierpont Circle | Two Pierpont Circle | April 4, 1990 (#90000492) | 2 Pierpont Cir. 32°03′17″N 81°04′01″W | Savannah | |
| 69 | Tybee Island Back River Historic District | Tybee Island Back River Historic District | August 5, 1999 (#99000928) | Along Chatham Ave., from Tybee River to Venetian Dr. 31°59′27″N 80°51′09″W | Tybee Island | |
| 70 | Tybee Island Strand Cottages Historic District | Tybee Island Strand Cottages Historic District | April 2, 1999 (#98000971) | Selected properties between Butler Ave. and Atlantic Ocean, between 12 St. and 14th St. 31°59′47″N 80°50′49″W | Tybee Island | |
| 71 | U.S. Customhouse | U.S. Customhouse | May 29, 1974 (#74000666) | 1-3 E. Bay St. 32°04′50″N 81°05′28″W | Savannah | |
| 72 | Vernonburg Historic District | Vernonburg Historic District | June 22, 2000 (#00000714) | Dancy Ave., Rockwell Ave. and S. Rockwell Ave. 31°58′19″N 81°07′34″W | Vernonburg | |
| 73 | Edgar A. Weil House | Edgar A. Weil House | October 4, 2016 (#16000686) | 802 14th St. 31°59′49″N 80°51′14″W | Tybee Island | |
| 74 | Wild Heron | Wild Heron | December 16, 1977 (#77000415) | 15 mi. SW of Savannah off U.S. 17; 2148 Grove Point Rd. 31°58′14″N 81°13′08″W | Savannah | |
| 75 | Clarence and Louise Golden Williams House | | May 15, 2023 (#100007895) | 2211 Norwood Ave, Sandfly Community; 31°59′16″N 81°04′18″W | Savannah | |
| 76 | F. W. Woolworth Co. Store - Savannah | | July 16, 2026 (#100013243) | 129 East Broughton Street; 32°04′42″N 81°05′24″W | Savannah | |
| 77 | Wormsloe Plantation | Wormsloe Plantation | April 26, 1973 (#73000615) | Isle of Hope and Long Island; 31°57′53″N 81°04′14″W | Savannah | Now a Georgia state historic site |
