= Cuyler–Brownville Historic District =

Historic district in Savannah, Georgia, US

- U.S. Historic district
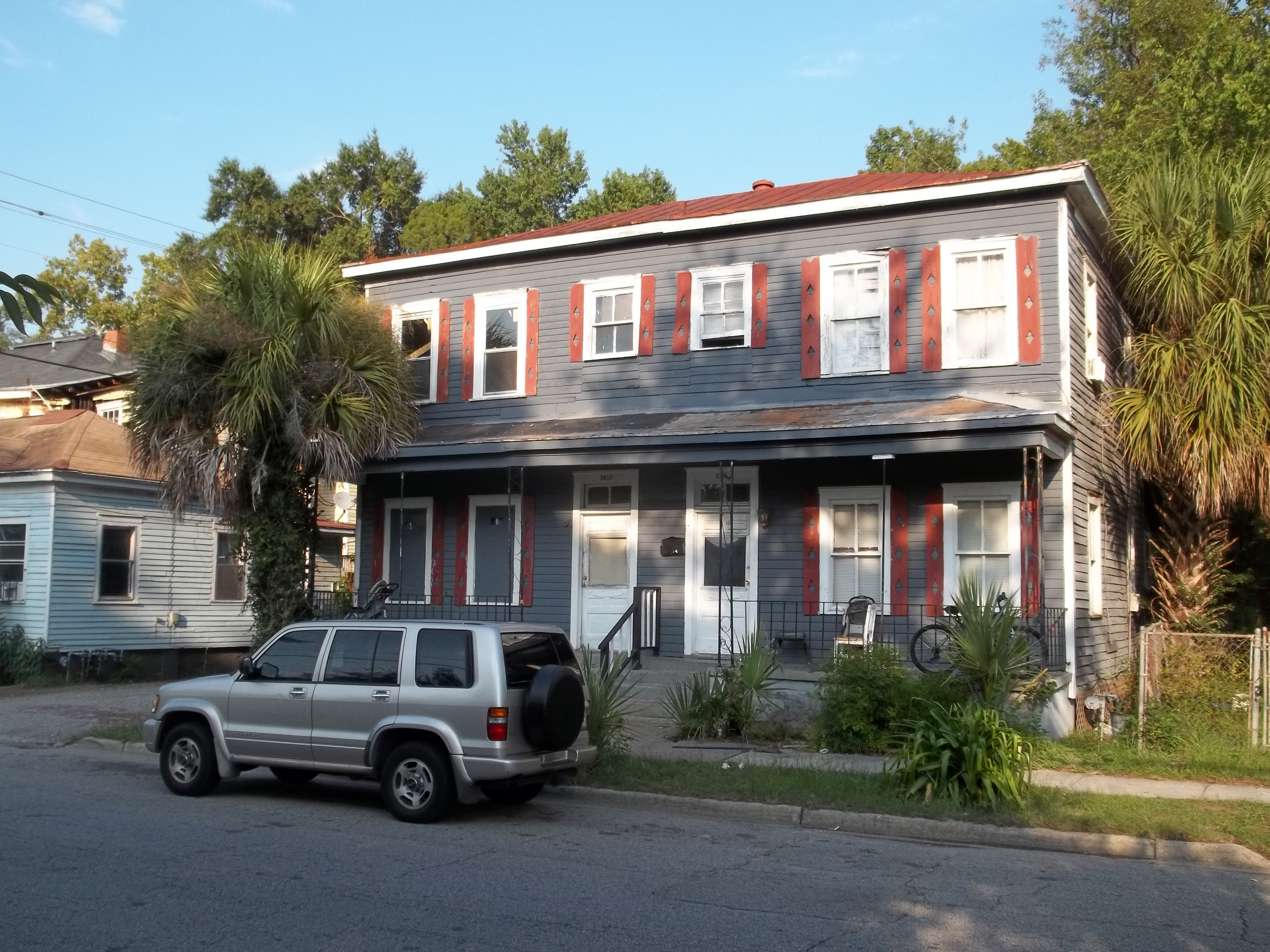

- Location within Georgia Location within the United States
- Location: Savannah, Georgia
- Coordinates: 32°3′30″N 81°5′29″W
- Added to NRHP: 1997

The Cuyler–Brownville Historic District is a historic district in Savannah, Georgia. It is one of the oldest African-American neighborhoods in the city.

== History ==
Cuyler–Brownville was founded by freed slaves who migrated following the American Civil War. By 1886, the neighborhood was annexed by the City of Savannah. The name Cuyler taken after the Cuyler Street School which was built in 1914. The neighborhood was declared a local historic district by the Savannah City Council in 1999.

== Gallery ==
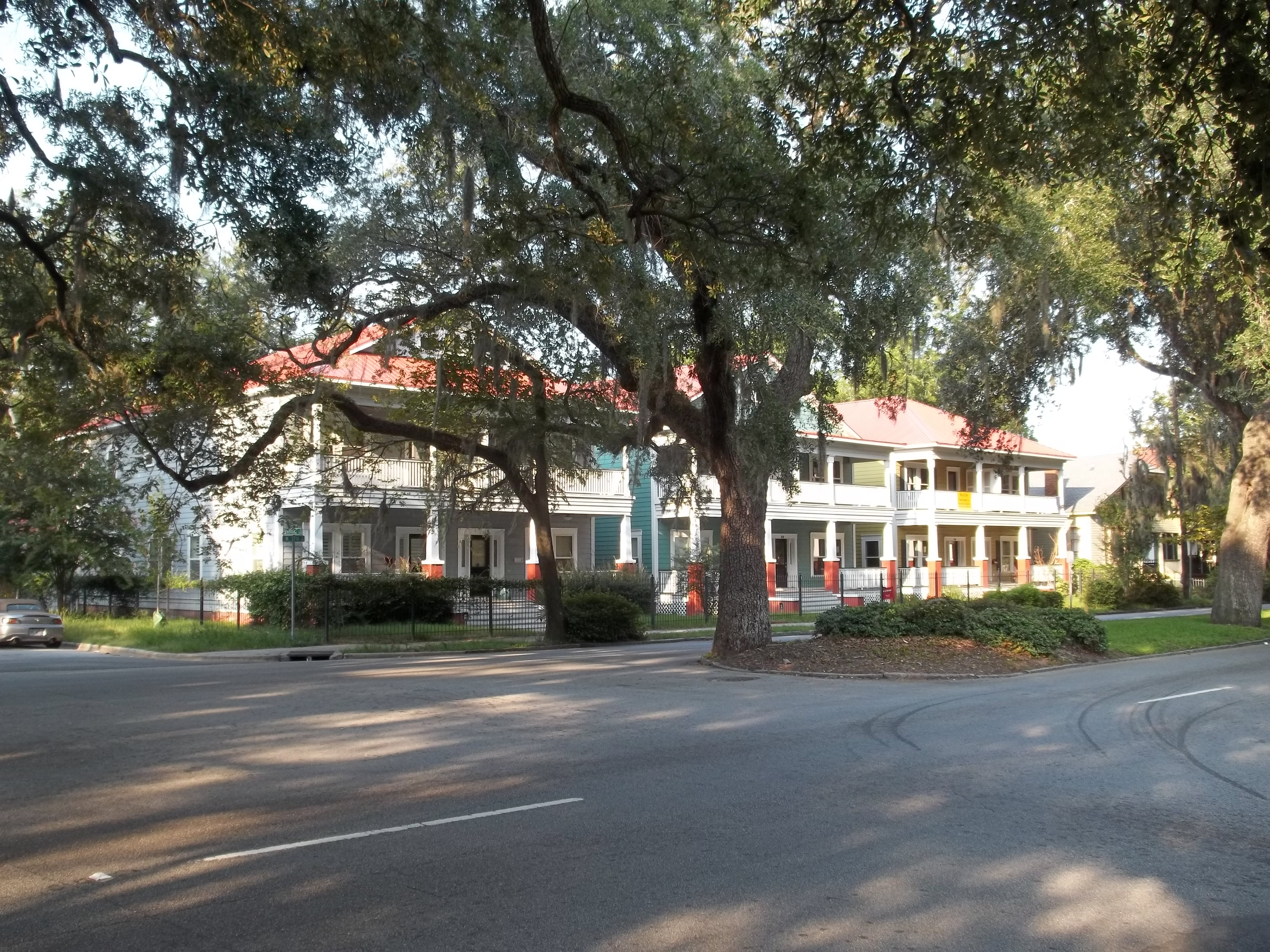

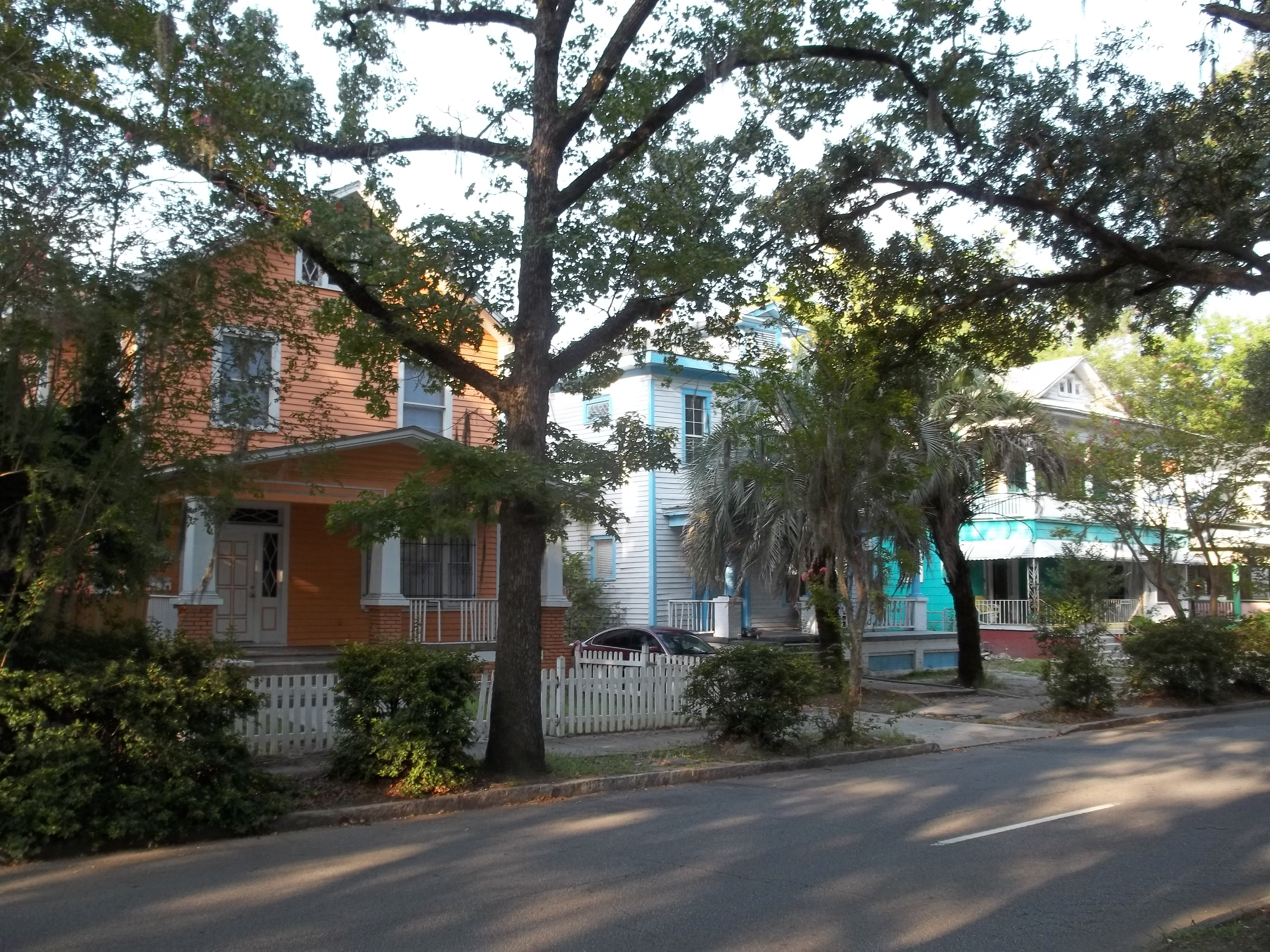

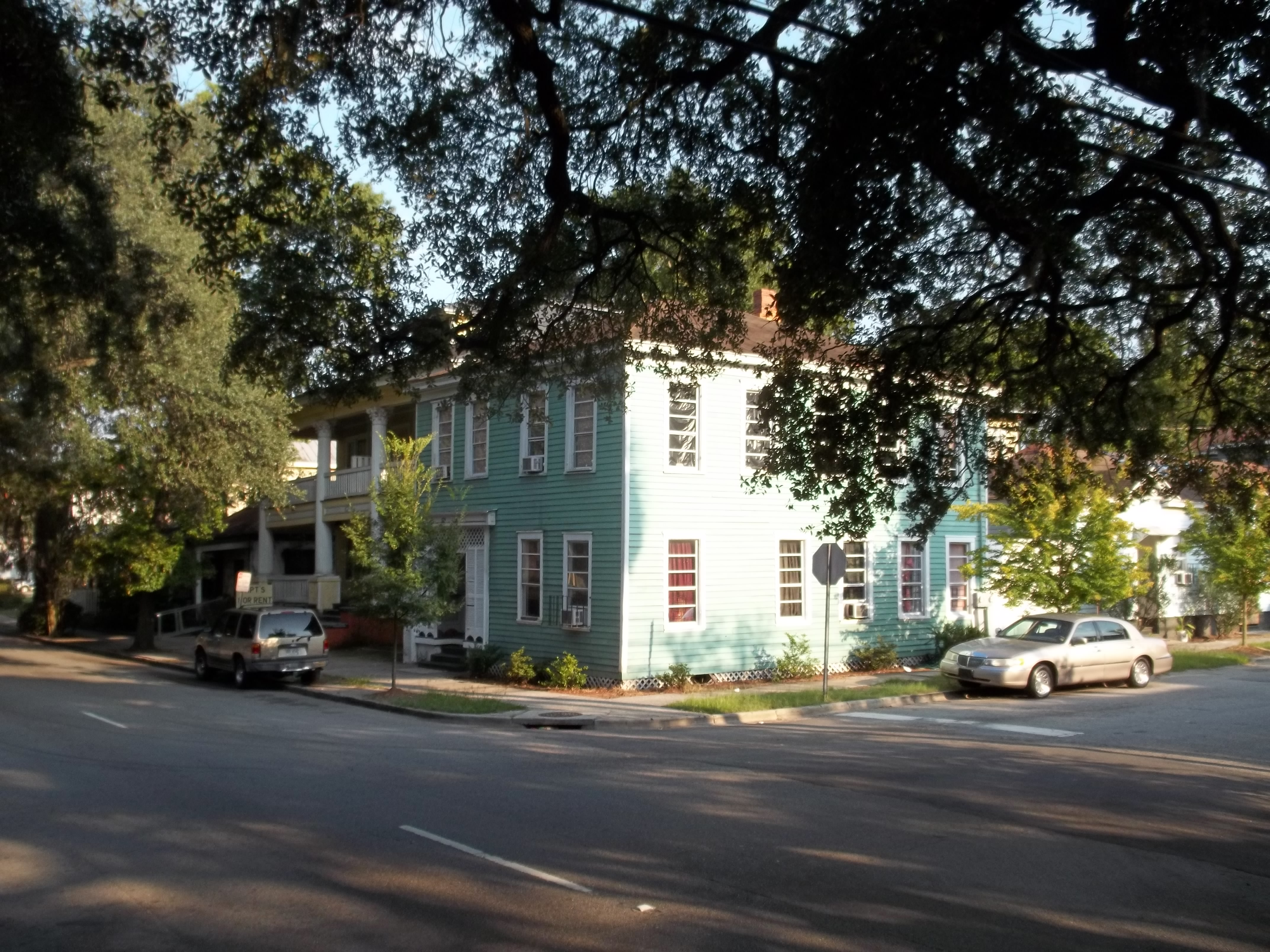

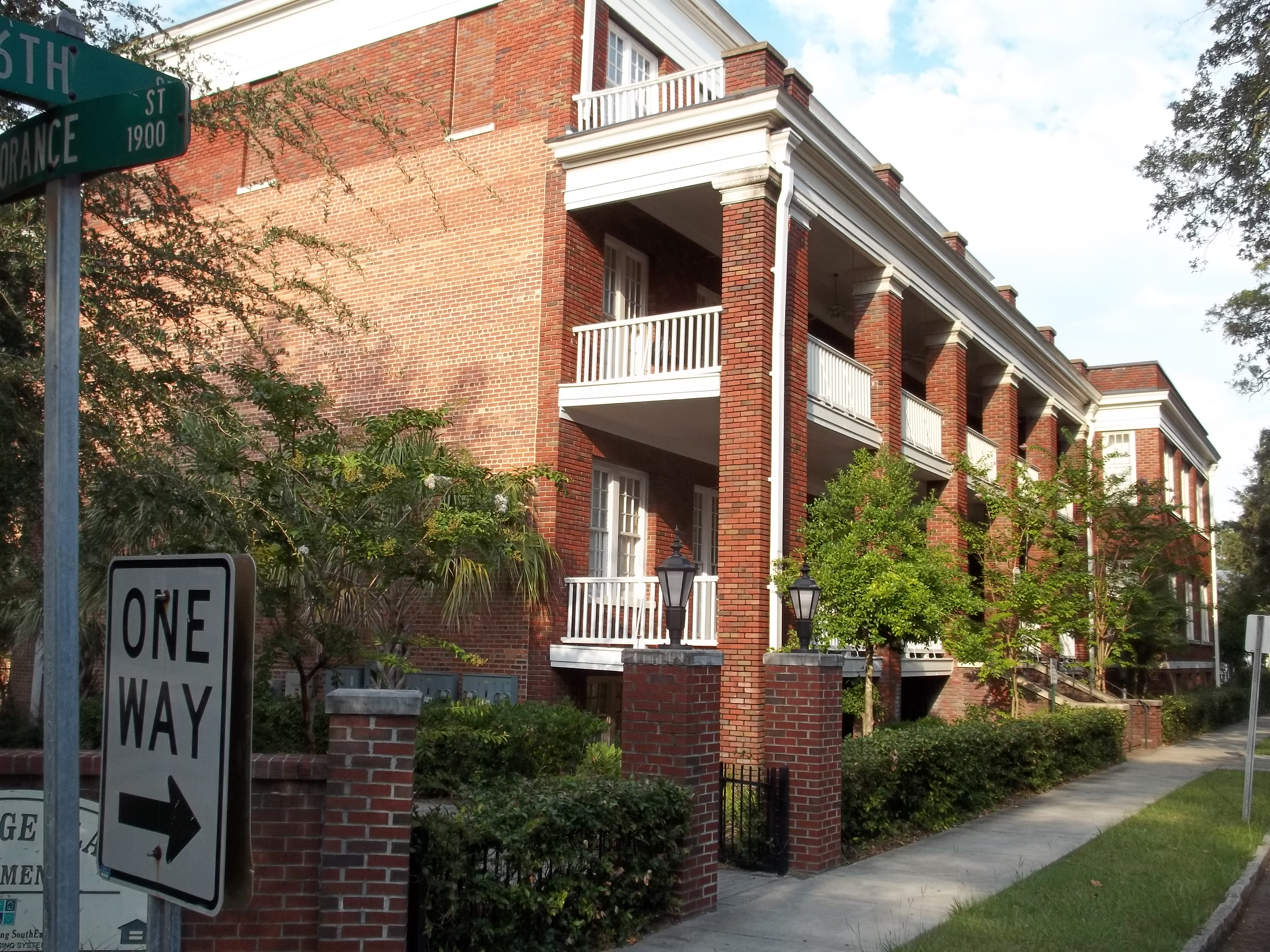

== See also ==
- National Register of Historic Places listings in Chatham County, Georgia
