= Saint Andrew's School (Georgia) =

Independent school in Georgia, US

St. Andrew's School

Location
- 601 Penn Waller Road; Savannah, Georgia 31410; United States; 32°00′41″N 80°58′32″W

Information
- Type: Private; College preparatory
- Established: 1978 (48 years ago)
- CEEB code: 112681
- Principal: Kelley Waldron
- Faculty: 66
- Grades: Pre-K - 12th
- Colors: blue and white
- Athletics: Georgia Independent School Association (GIAA)
- Mascot: Lions
- Accreditation: Southern Association of Colleges and Schools; Southern Association of Independent Schools
- Website: saslions.com

St. Andrew's School is an independent college preparatory school located on Wilmington Island in Savannah, Georgia, United States. It is a registered 501(c)(3) non-profit organization. Established in 1978, it is dually accredited by Southern Association of Independent Schools and Southern Association of Colleges and Schools. The school serves students in Pre-K through 12th grade, and has several athletic and fine arts programs.

== History ==
The St. Andrew's School headstone

St. Andrew's began when the Independent Presbyterian Church of Savannah started a kindergarten for 4- to 5-year-olds in 1947. Over the course of a few decades, more grades were added. The first and only class graduated from the Independent Presbyterian Day School in 1978, and is considered to be St. Andrew's' first alumni, consisting of 10 students.

The school was relocated to Wilmington Island in November 1978 and a new campus was built. It included the Gus H. Bell Hall and the Compton Center. By 1979, the gymnasium was completed and the school's first basketball game was played. By 1986 a third building was opened, named Skinner Hall.

In 2002, the school purchased what is now the Johnson Early Childhood Center on Betz Creek. By 2005, St. Andrew's had turned into what it is now the Lower School Campus of the school. St. Andrew's is now composed of three separate campuses: one for lower school (Pre-K to 4th), another for middle school (5th to 8th), and one for high school (9th to 12th).

== Academics ==
=== Fine arts ===
The school offers many fine arts courses, including:

- Band
- Strings
- Theatre
- Visual Arts
- Chorus

=== Foreign languages ===
St. Andrew's offers three foreign language courses: Mandarin, Spanish, and French. It also has a Scottish historical background.

== Athletics ==
St. Andrew's offers many sports as part of their athletics program.

- Baseball
- Basketball
- Cheerleading
- Cross country (long-distance running)
- Football
- Soccer
- Swimming
- Tennis
- Track and field

== Programs ==
=== International Baccalaureate ===
St. Andrew's is an International Baccalaureate (IB) school, offering IB advanced classes in many fields of study.

=== Affiliations ===
St. Andrew's is currently affiliated with the following organizations:

- Southern Association of Independent Schools (SAIS)
- AdvancED (formerly SACS)
- National Association of Independent Schools (NAIS)
- Georgia Independent School Association (GISA)
- South Carolina Independent School Association (SCISA)
