= Lebanon Plantation =

- U.S. National Register of Historic Places
- U.S. Historic district
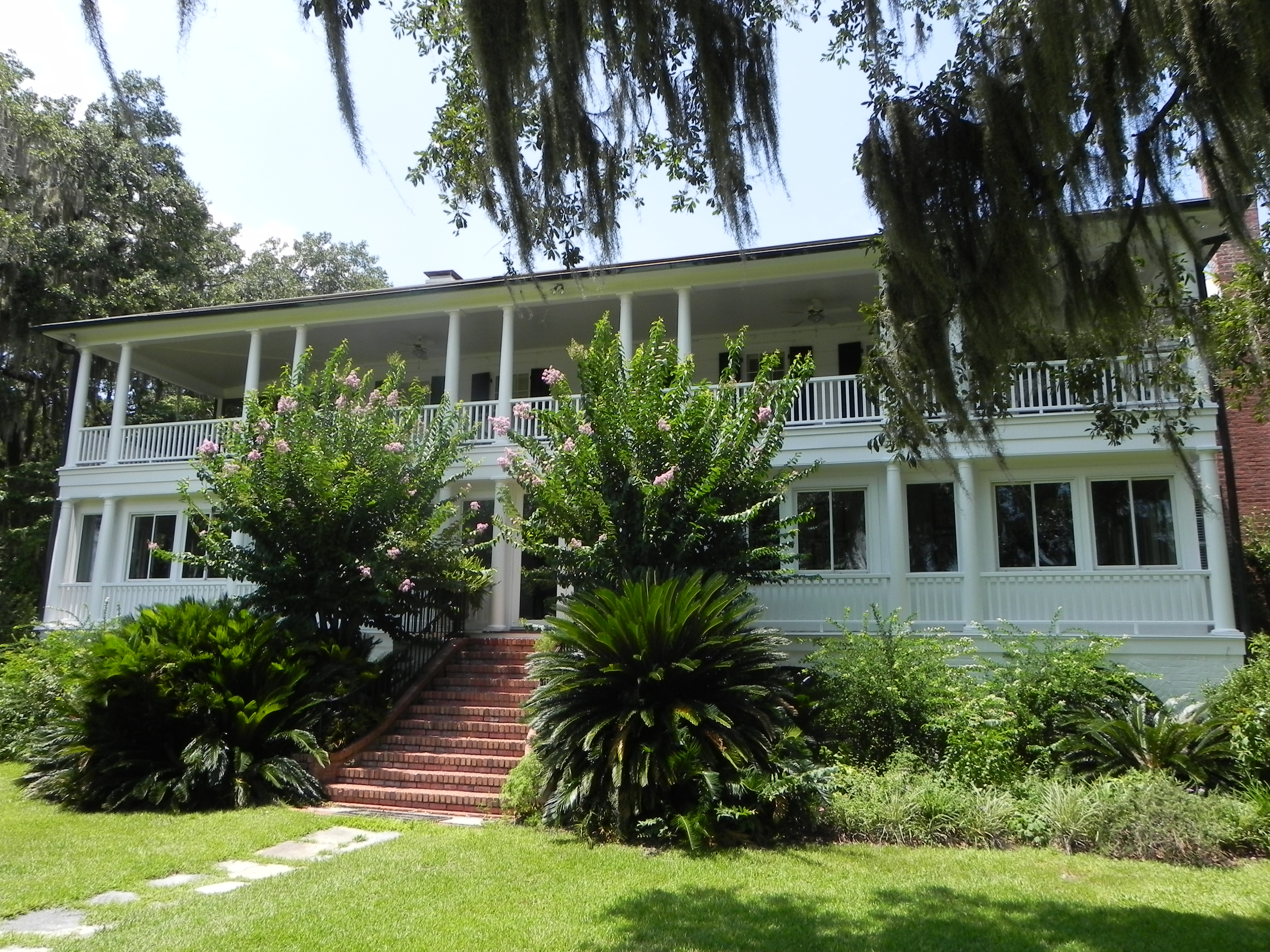
- Main house at Lebanon Plantation

- Location within Georgia Location within the United States
- Location: 5745 Ogeechee Road, Savannah, Georgia, U.S.
- Coordinates: 32.006°N 81.2105°W
- Area: 76 acres (31 ha)
- Built: 1804, 1873
- Architectural style: Plantation Plain
- NRHP reference No.: 79000704
- Added to NRHP: November 29, 1979

Lebanon Plantation is a Private historic site located at 5745 Ogeechee Road in Savannah, Georgia. The site is over 500 acres (2.0 km^{2}) consisting of a large estate granted to James Deveaux in 1756, and was named for the many cedar trees on the property. An additional 500 acres were granted to Phillip Delegal in 1758 and eventually became part of the plantation. The site was purchased by Joseph Habersham in 1802. Habersham sold it in 1804 to George W. Anderson who built the main house that was rebuilt and added on to after the American Civil War. Anderson's son, George Wayne Anderson, JR Commanded Fort McAllister in the Civil War, and after the fort fell, Lebanon became his prison and the headquarters of the Fifteenth Army Corps of the US Army.

After occupation, the main house at Lebanon was partially destroyed, and foreclosed upon in 1868. It was recovered by George W. Anderson in 1871. The extent of the damage to the original house is not known, but was rebuilt and repaired by April 23, 1873. Anderson later divided the property and allowed French immigrants to form a colony called L'Esperance. They planted and cultivated vineyards that did not succeed. In 1916, Savannah's Mills Bee Lane, father of the city's preservationist Mary Lane Morrison, purchased the plantation from the Anderson family heirs, and grew a new variety of orange, called the Savannah Satsuma. It was later owned by Morrison's son, Howard J. Morrison Jr. (1943–2019), and his wife, Mary Reynolds Morrison, the third generation of the Lane–Morrison family to continuously own the property.

Lebanon remains a working plantation today, much in the same manner it has for over two centuries and is private not open to the public.

== Geographical setting ==
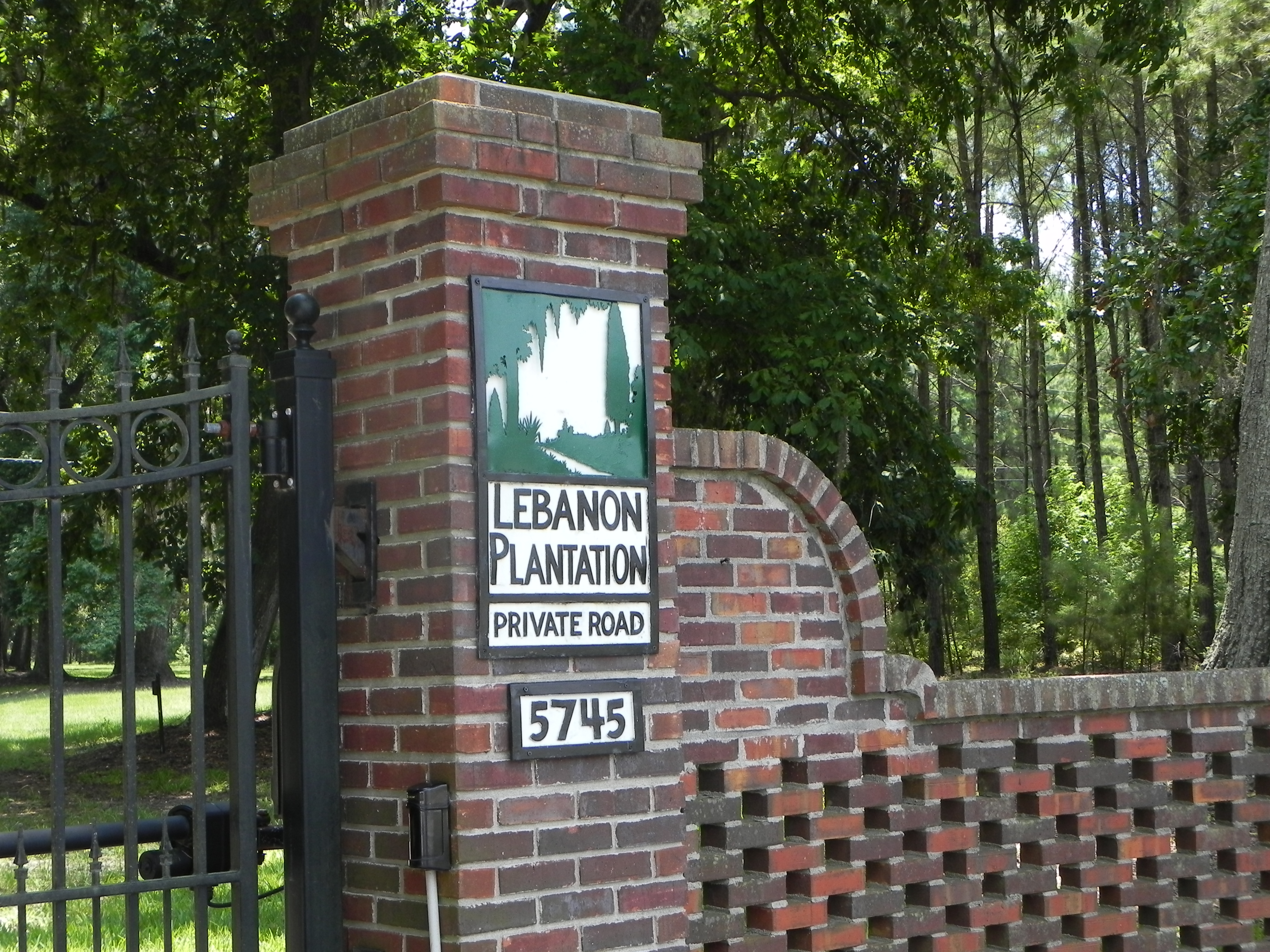
Entrance to Lebanon Plantation

Lebanon Plantation is situated approximately 9 miles (14 km) southwest of downtown Savannah in Georgia's Lower Coastal Plain region. Located at 5475 Ogeechee Road, just off historic Highway 17.

== History ==
=== Early history ===
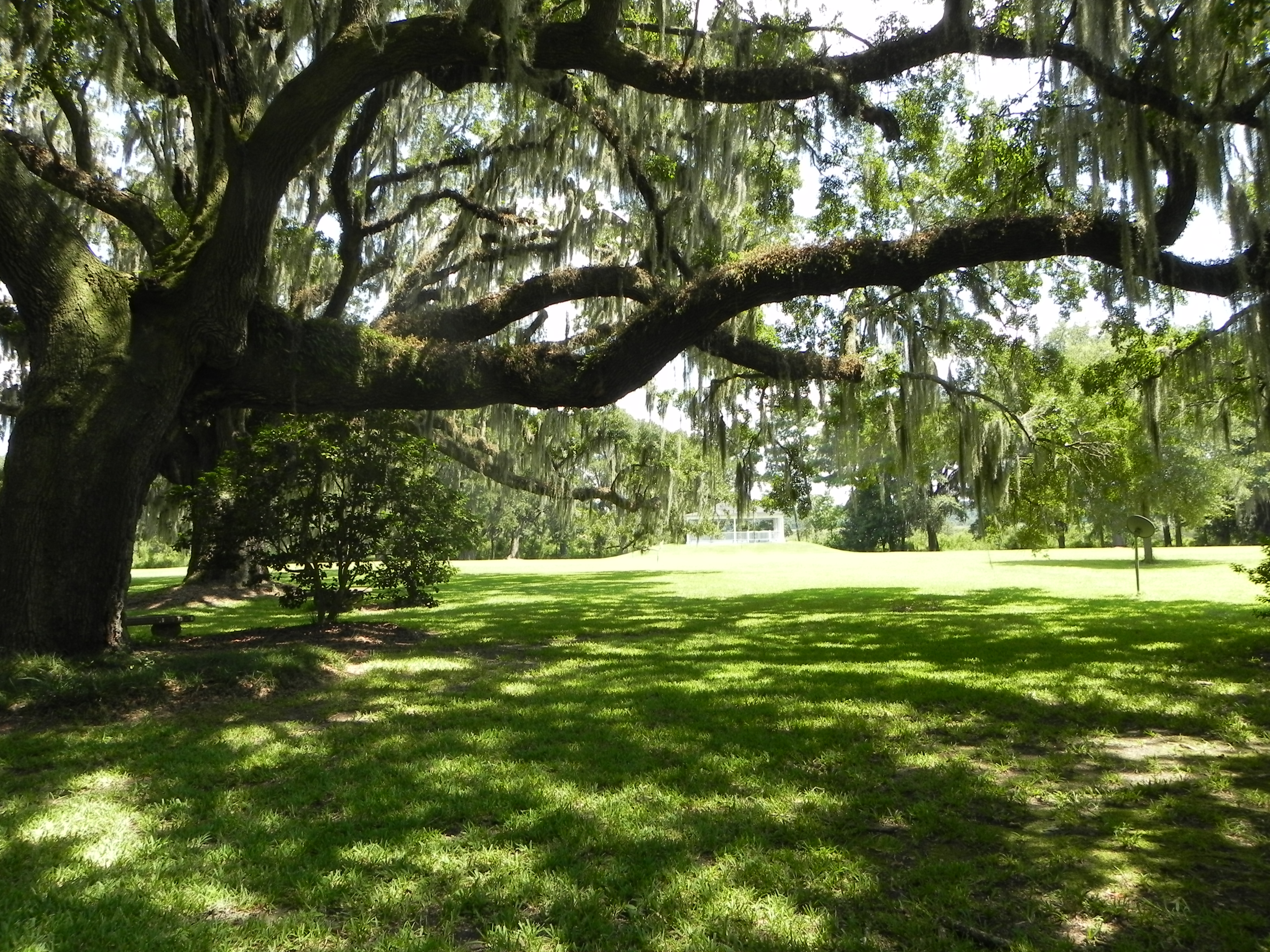
Lebanon Plantation Live Oak

Native Americans have probably inhabited the area on at least a semi-annual basis for thousands of years, as indicated by oyster shell deposits excavated in the vicinity. By the time European explorers arrived in the area in the 16th century, the area was claimed by the Yuchi and the Creek tribe. When the first permanent English colonists landed at what is now Savannah in 1733, the area was part of the domain of the Yamacraw, a detached branch of the Creeks, although the area was apparently uninhabited at the time. James Oglethorpe, the leader of these English colonists, maintained a friendly relationship with the Yamacraw chief Tomochichi, and managed to peacefully acquire the Savannah area and the lands in its vicinity.

Throughout the late 17th-century, Spain (which had established itself in Florida in the previous century) retained loose control over the Georgia coast via Native American allies. This inevitably brought them into conflict with the growing English colonies to the north, namely Carolina. In 1702, Carolina governor James Moore led an expedition against Spanish settlements in Florida and, en route, raided and destroyed the Spanish Native American missions off the Georgia coast. While Spain still claimed the coast and islands, the area was largely abandoned, creating a buffer zone between Spanish Florida and the English Carolinas.

In the early 1730s, the English decided to colonize the islands between the Carolinas and Florida. A charter was granted in 1732, and the first colonists set sail in the same year. The English colonists that arrived at Savannah in 1733 formed the core of what would eventually become the colony and state of Georgia.

=== Establishment of Lebanon Plantation ===
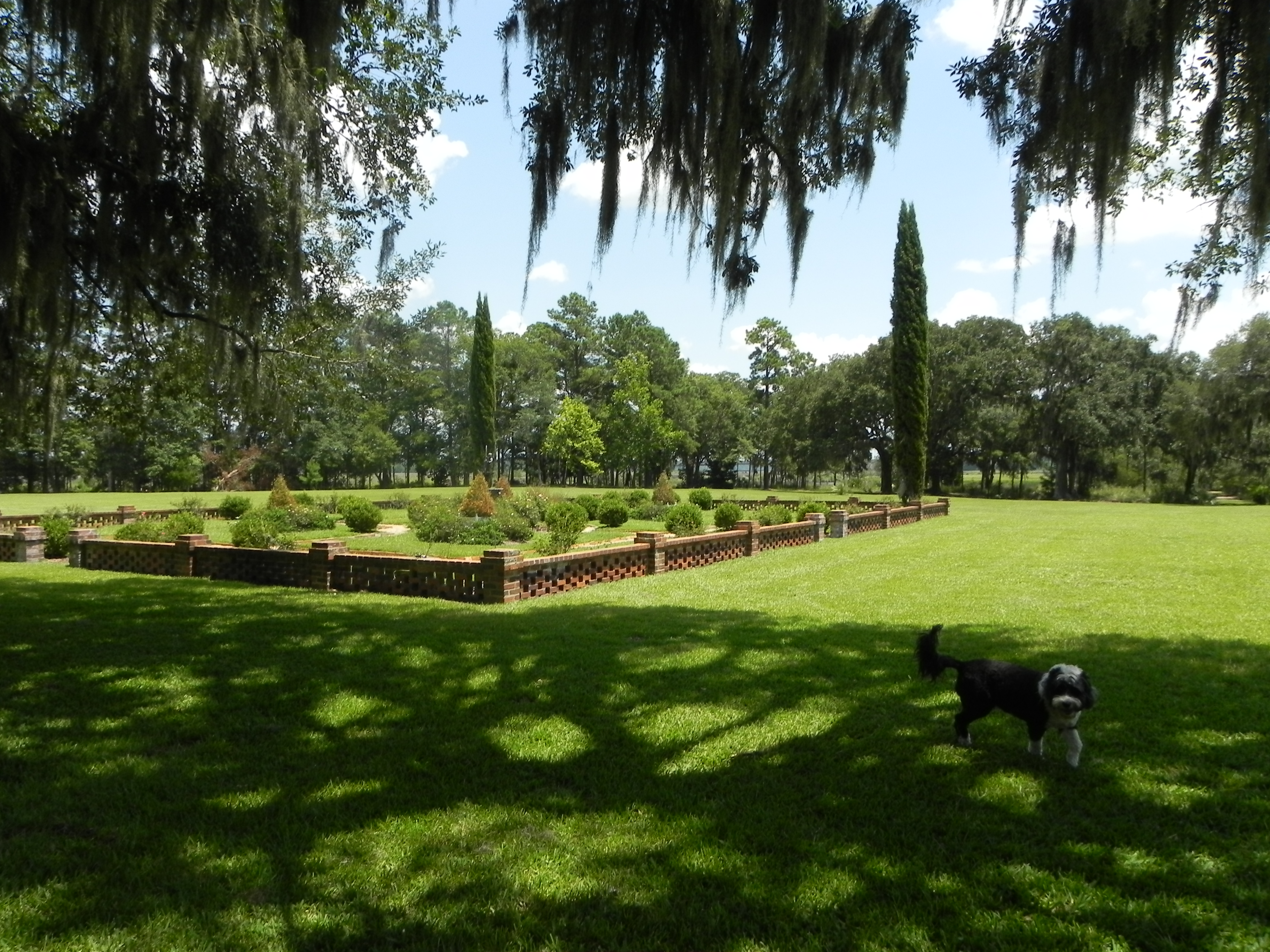
Lebanon Plantation cedars

Nearby, Noble Jones' fortified house was one of several defensive works built between Frederica on Saint Simons Island and the Savannah townsite. The English were concerned that the Spanish still claimed the area and would eventually attempt to expel them. Conflict erupted in 1739 with the outbreak of the War of Jenkins' Ear, the name for the regional theater of the greater War of the Austrian Succession. Jones took part in an English raid along the St. Johns River in northern Florida in 1740, as well as the successful defense of Frederica at the Battle of Bloody Marsh in 1742. The end of the war in 1748 largely neutralized Spanish threats to the new colony. The land that would become Lebanon Plantation was granted to James Deveaux in 1756. An additional 500 acres was granted to Phillip Delegal in 1758, that eventually became part of the plantation.

Irishman Stephen Deane and African Fenda Lawrence, partners in the African slave trade, raised their mixed race children at Lebanon during the American Revolution.

=== Antebellum Lebanon ===
The practice of slavery had been banned by Georgia's original charter, so many land owners used indentured servant labor to tend the fields in many plantation's early years. When the Trustees revoked the ban on slavery in 1749, most turned to slave labor in order to make them profitable. During the American Civil War (1861–1865), Lebanon was occupied and served as the headquarters of the Fifteenth Army Corps, under the Command of General William Babcock Hazen. After the fall of Fort McAllister, its Commander, George Wayne Anderson Jr. was imprisoned in his own home. General Hazen and Lt. Col. Strong invited General William Tecumseh Sherman to dinner, to celebrate their victory. In a kind gesture of respect, General Hazen also invited Major Anderson to attend the meal, after clearing the request with Sherman. The discussion was surely lively - during the meal Anderson engaged in a heated exchange with General Sherman about the tactics employed to defend the fort and the bravery of all who fought there. Cigars were exchanged and smoked, tributes were made to the fallen.

=== Lebanon in the 20th century ===
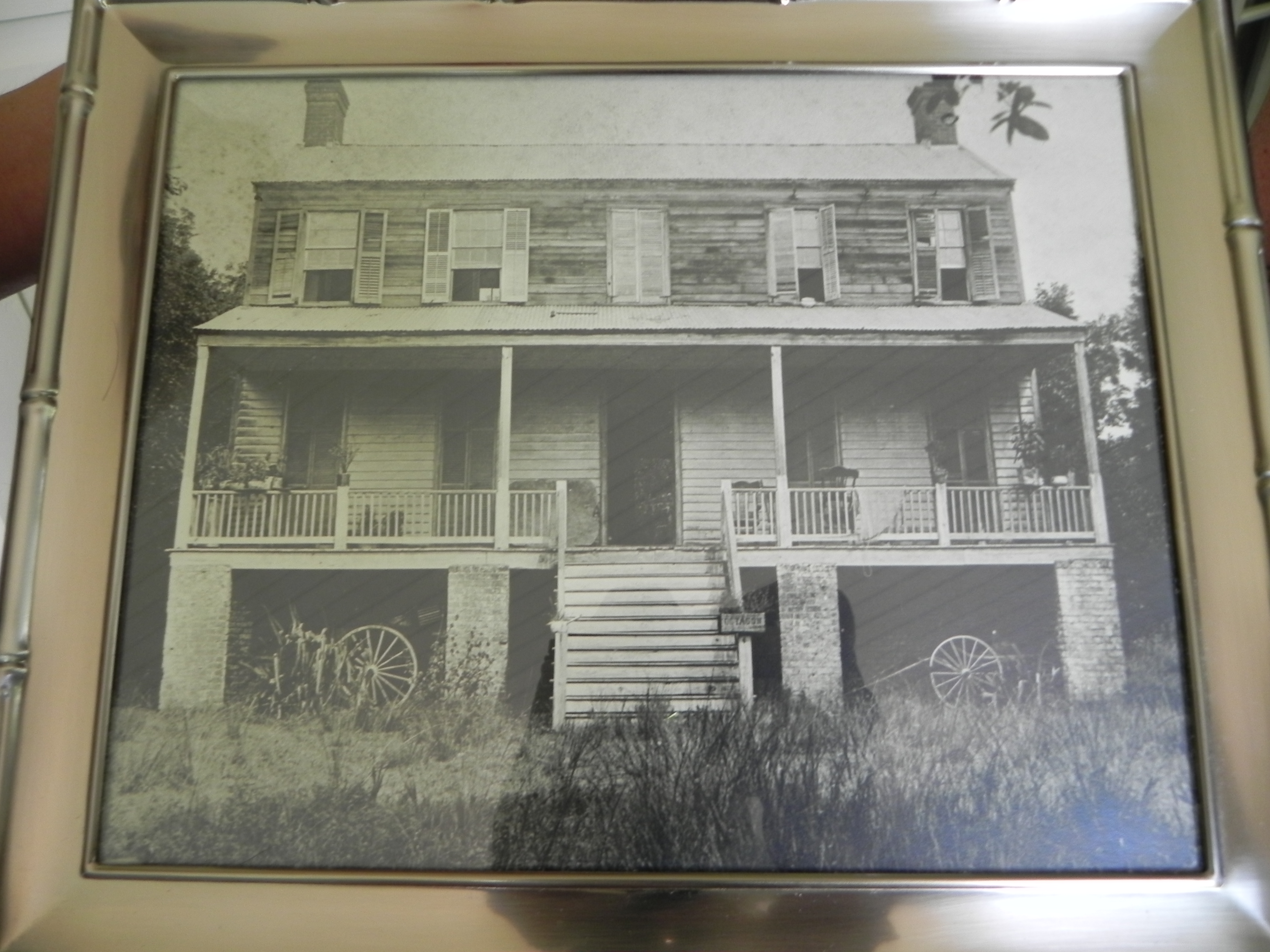
Lebanon Plantation main house 1916

Lebanon Plantation reflects the organic architectural growth of a plantation house continually occupied through several generations. From its antebellum origins, destruction and rebirth after the Civil War, Reconstruction and remodeling, the main house has retained its identity and character. The Neo-Classical veranda of the twentieth century coexists with the core of the house built in the Greek Revival style of the nineteenth century.

=== Lebanon Plantation today ===
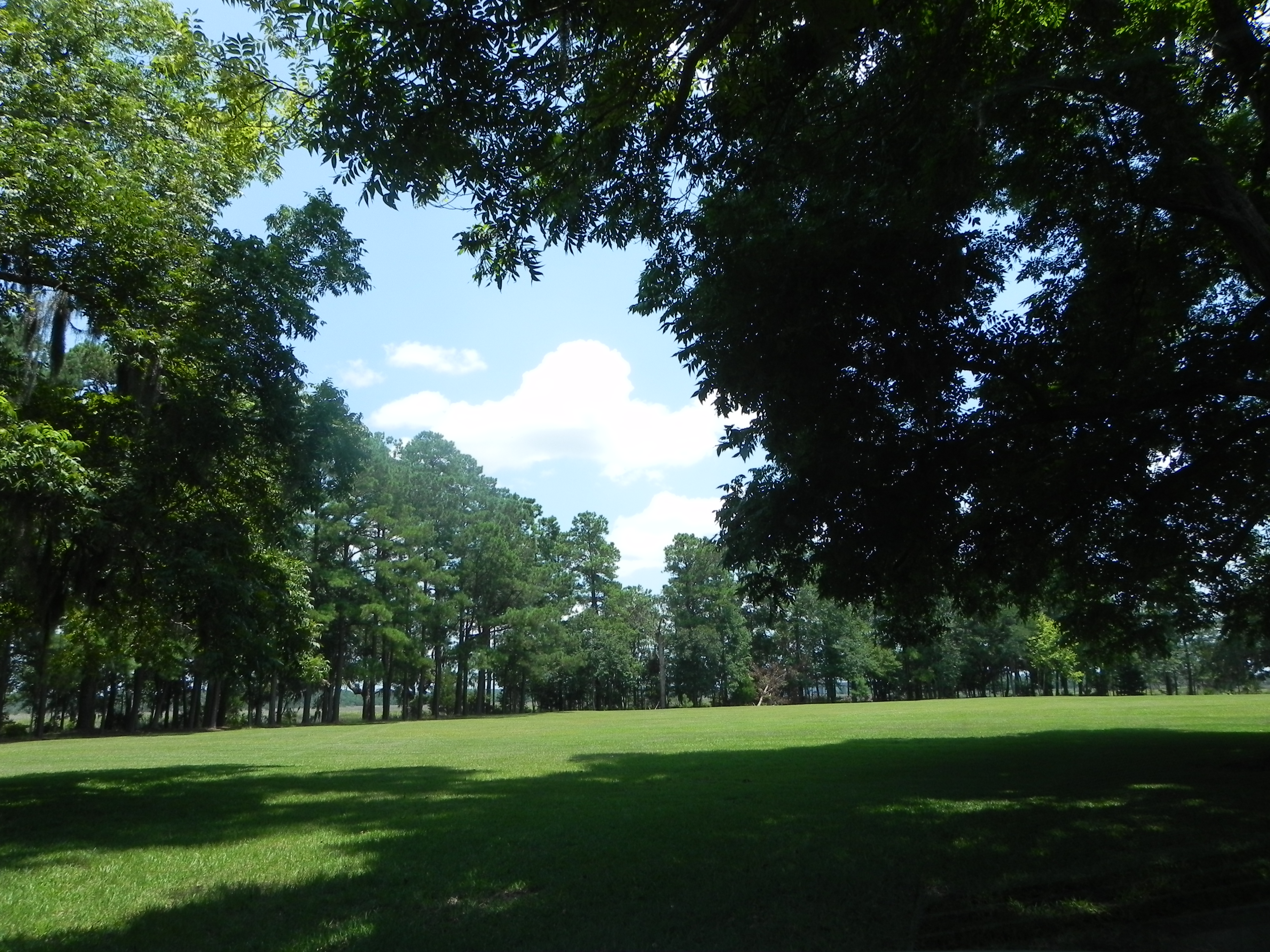
Lebanon Plantation

Today Lebanon's Verdant Kitchen, founded in 2012 by Howard Morrison and Brisbane native Ross Harding, produces beverages, baked goods, candies, snacks and spices available at regional farmers markets, online and in specialty gourmet and grocery stores. The ginger crops, including turmeric and galangal — also known as Thai ginger — are grown and harvested at Lebanon Plantation, then sliced, dried and ground at raw food temperature in the plantation's USDA-certified organic processing facility. The products are then made in the company's USDA-approved kitchen in Atlanta.

== See also ==
- National Register of Historic Places listings in Chatham County, Georgia

== Gallery ==
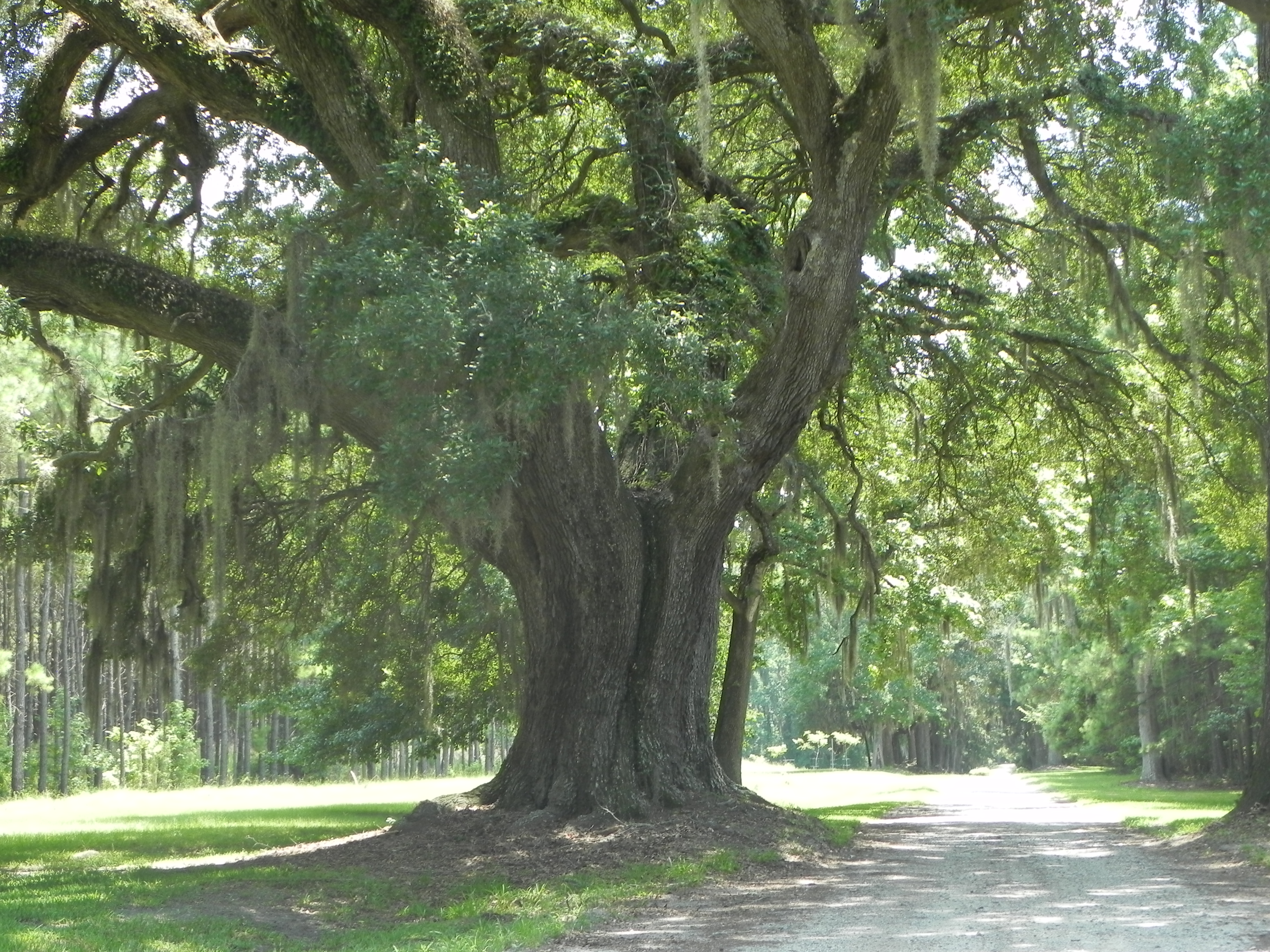
Lebanon Plantation Live Oak

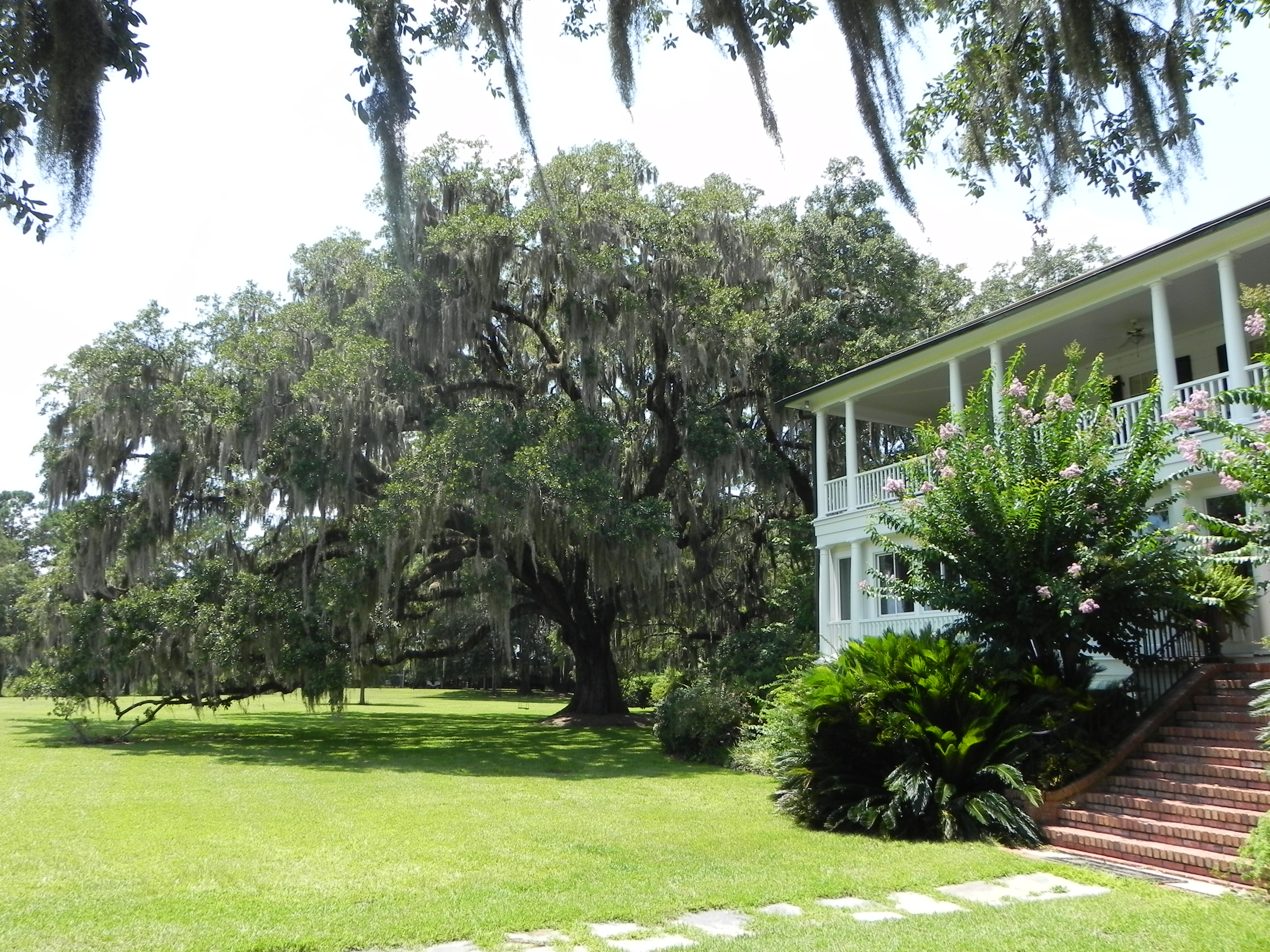
Lebanon Plantation Live Oak and Verandah

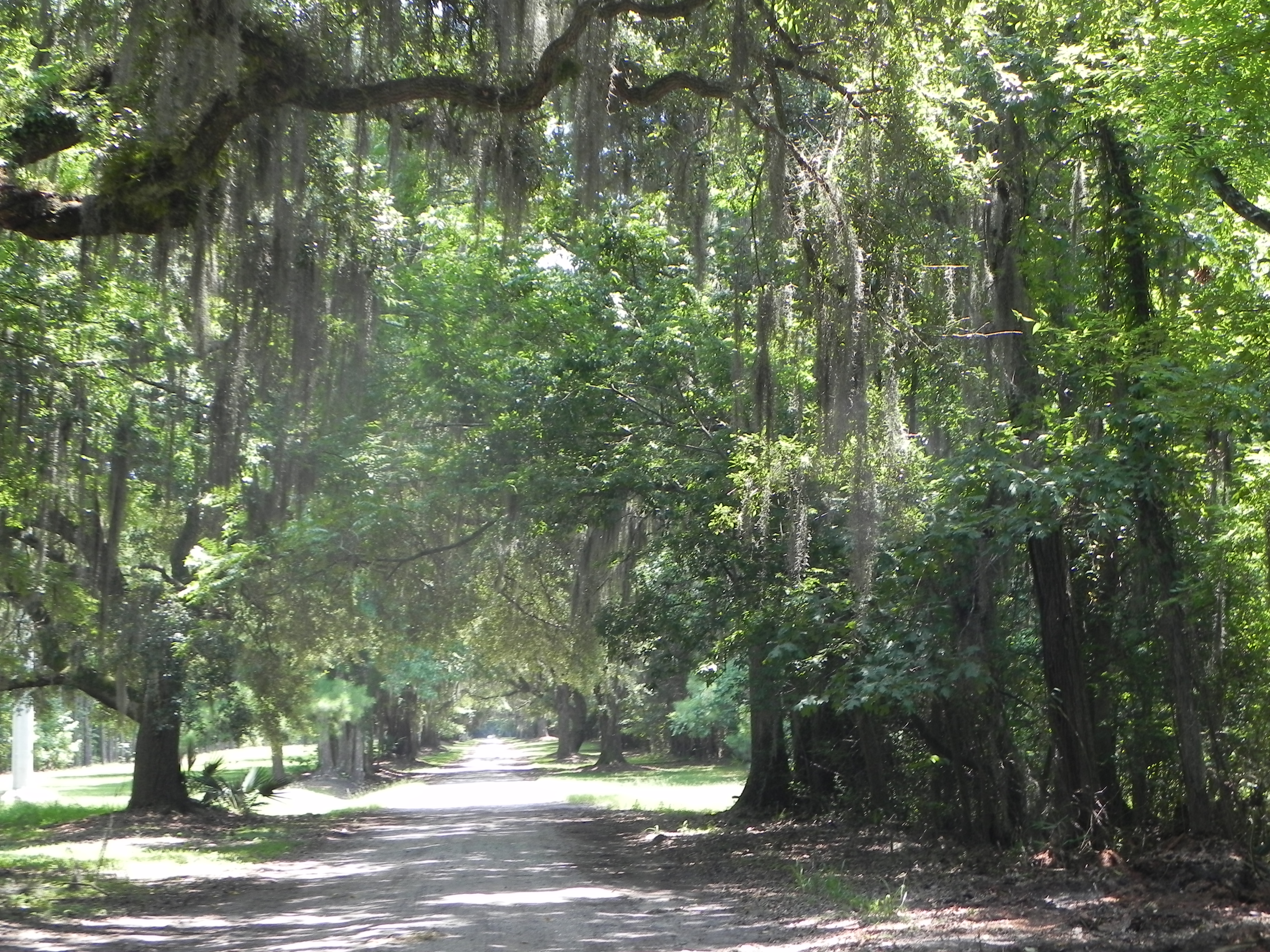
Road to Lebanon Plantation

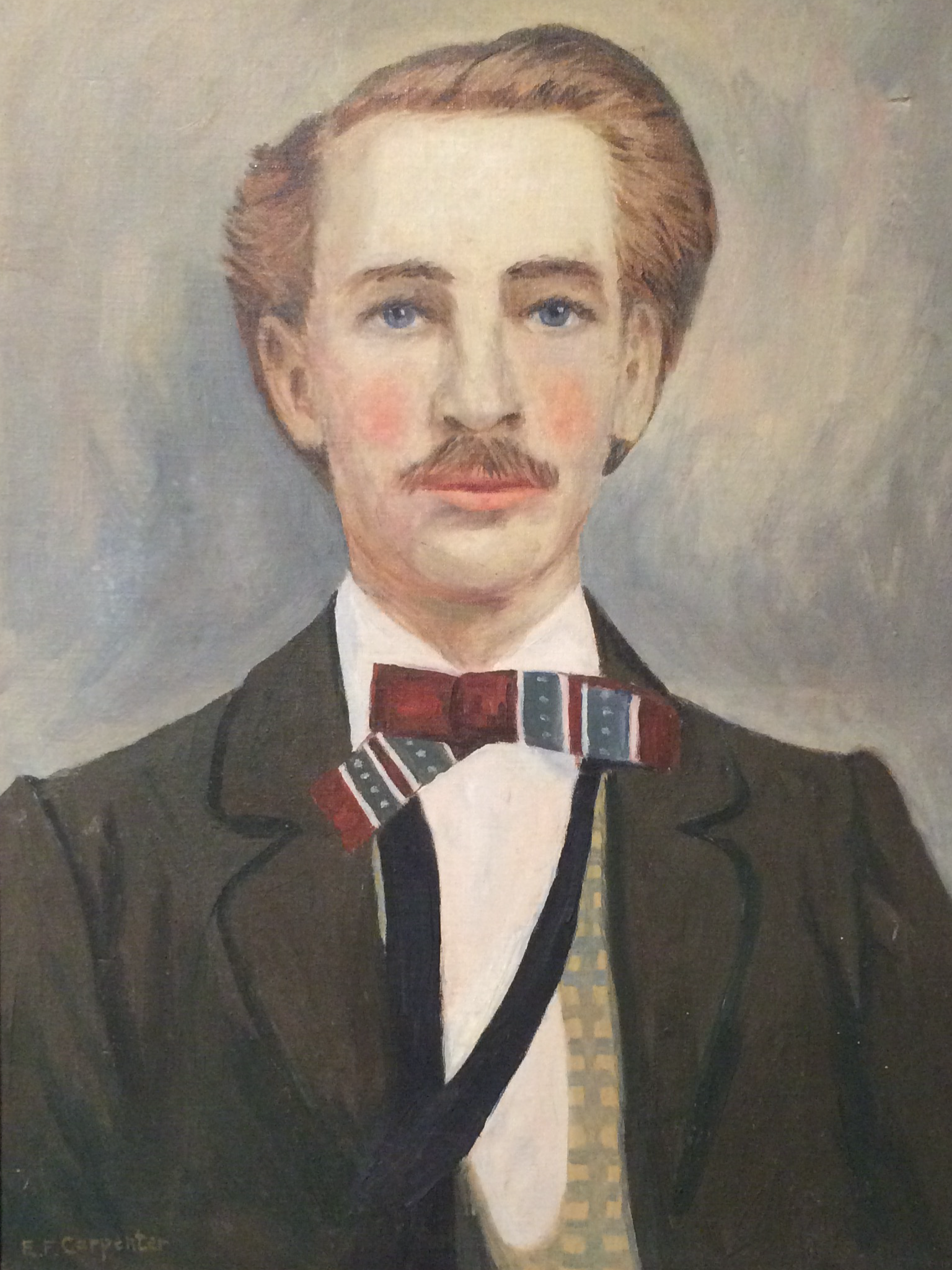
George Wayne Anderson, JR

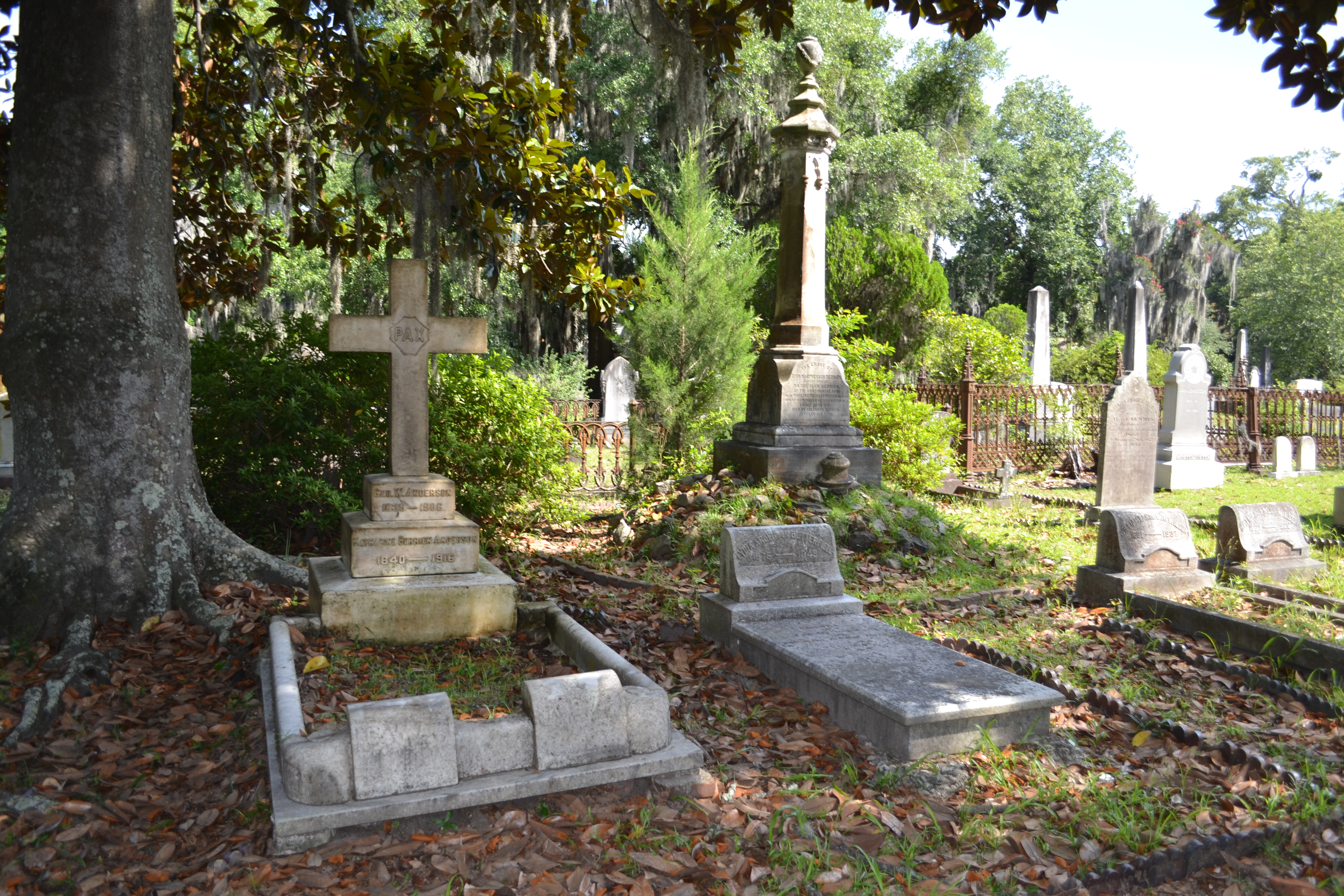
George Wayne Anderson Jr Gravesite at Laurel Grove Cemetery in Savannah, Georgia

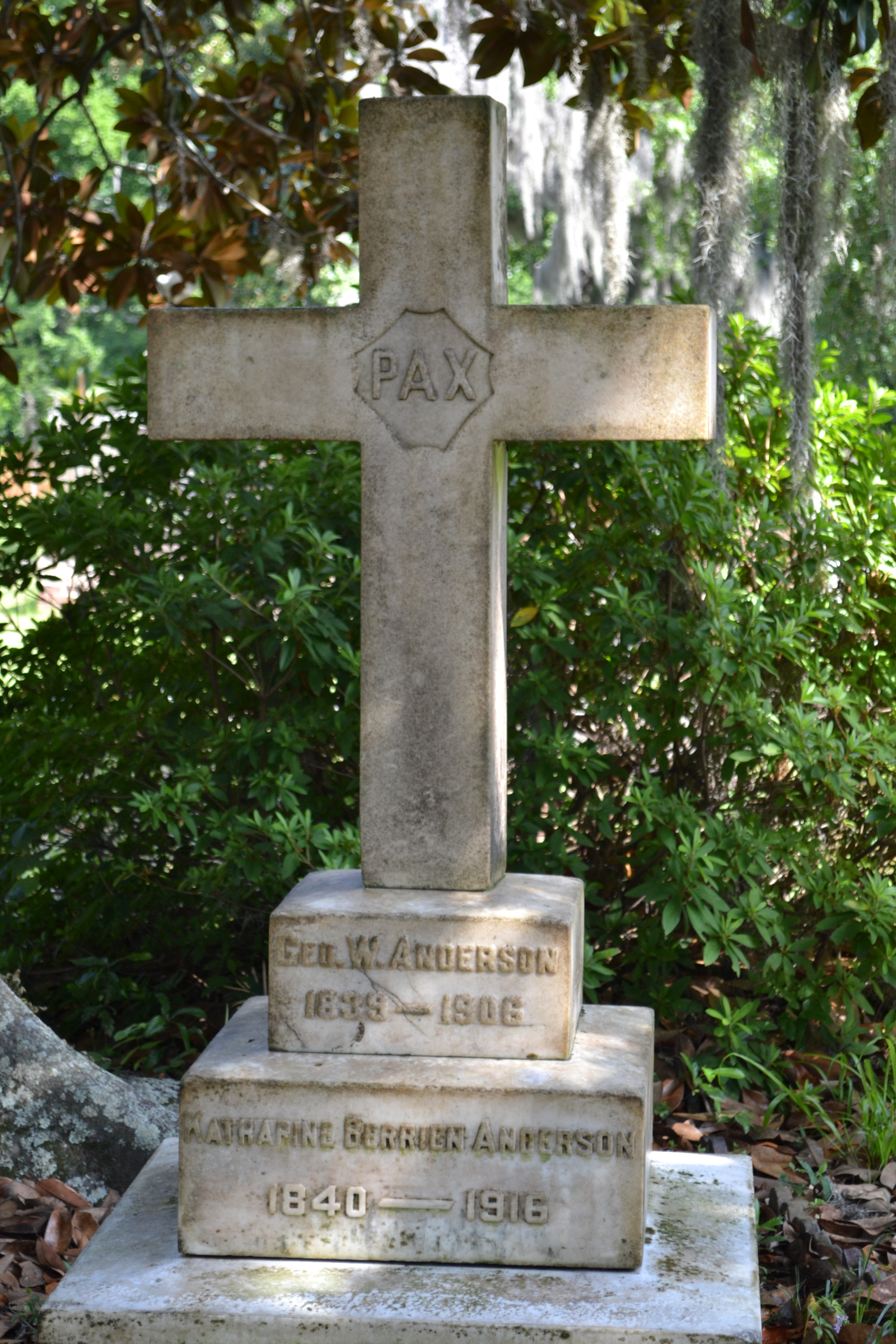
George Wayne Anderson Jr Gravesite at Laurel Grove Cemetery in Savannah, Georgia

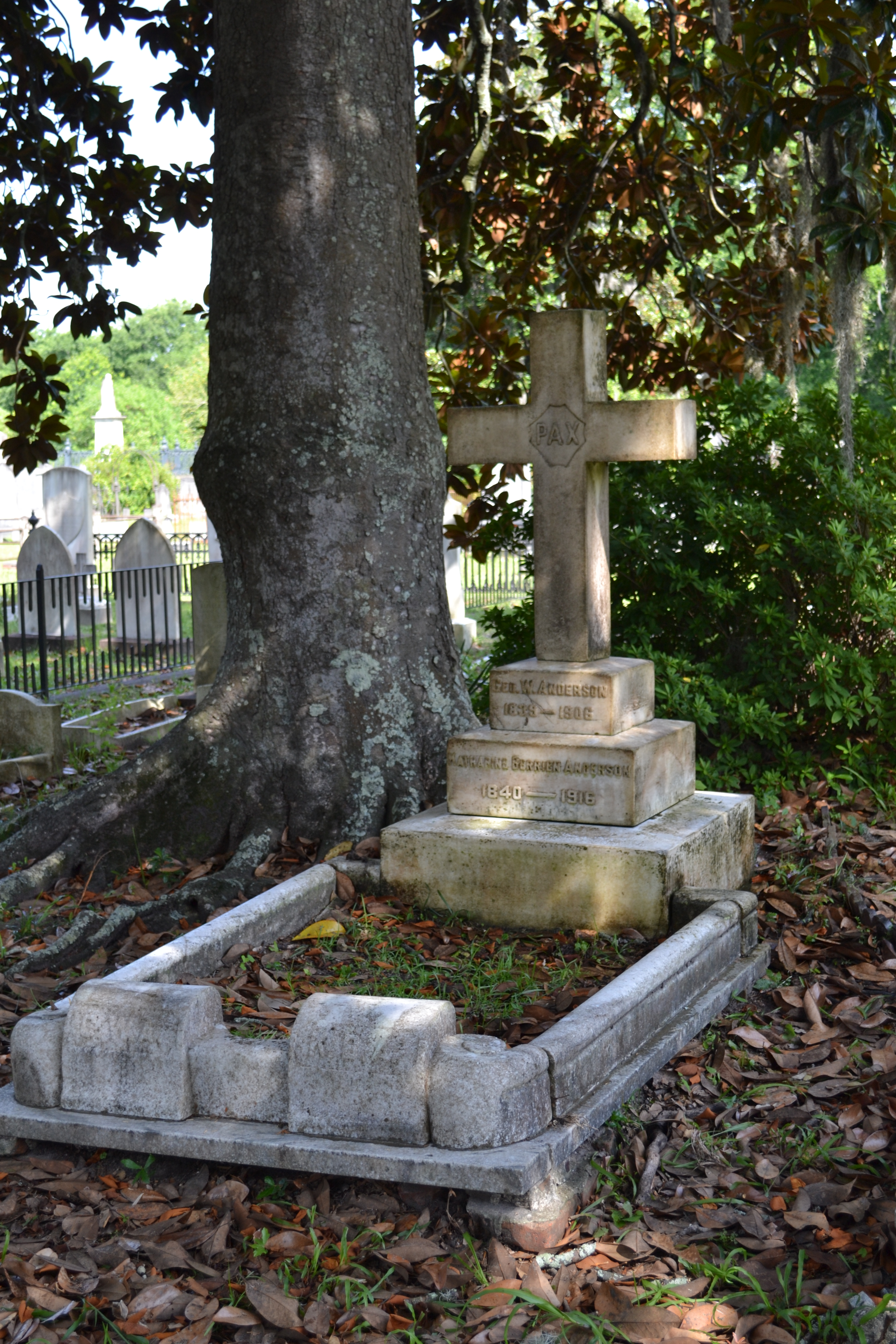
George Wayne Anderson Jr Gravesite at Laurel Grove Cemetery in Savannah, Georgia
