= Dutton–Waller Raised Tybee Cottage =

Historic house in Georgia, United States

- U.S. National Register of Historic Places
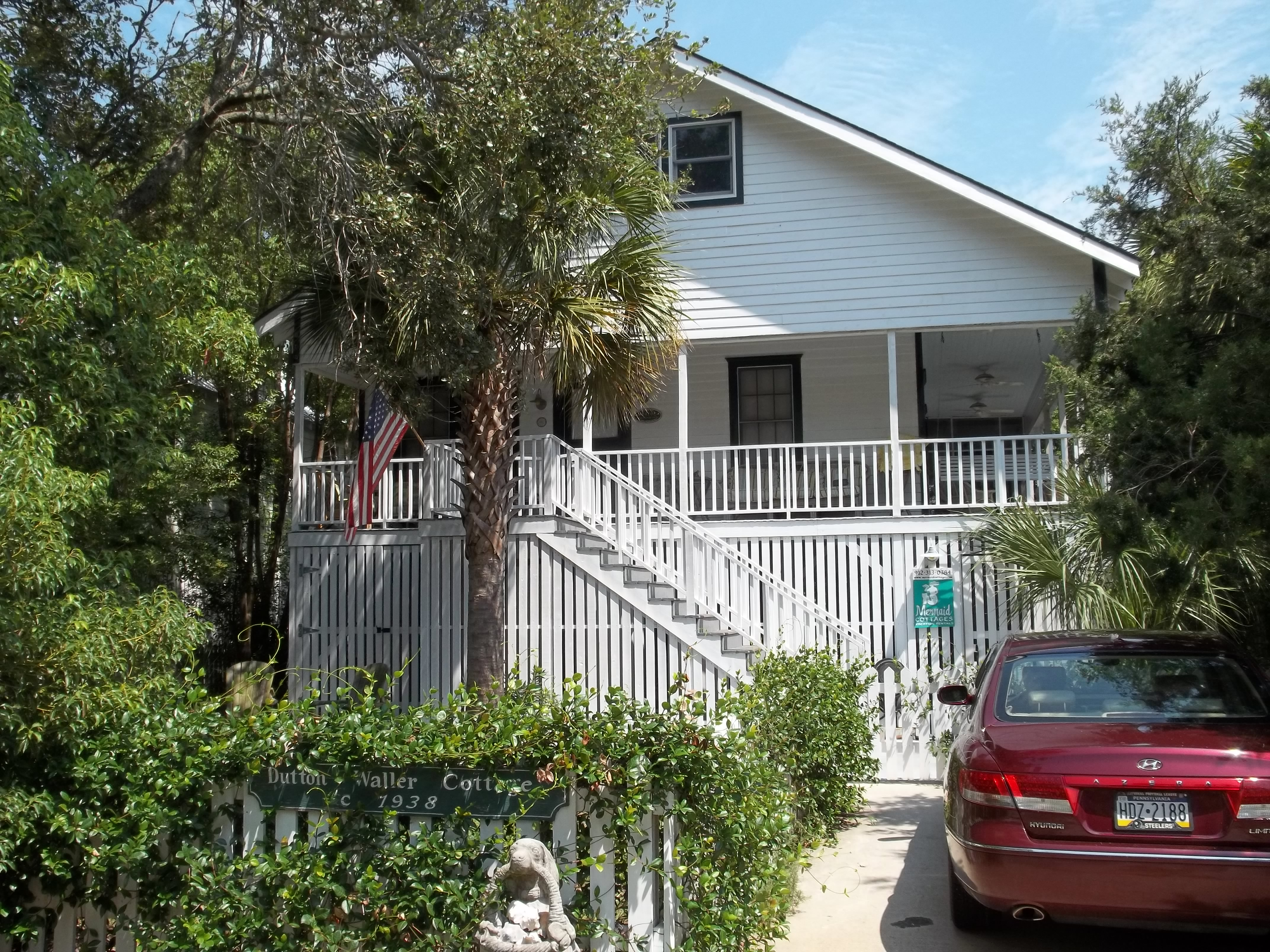

- Location within Georgia Location within the United States
- Location: 1416 7th Ave., Tybee Island, Georgia
- Coordinates: 31.99566°N 80.85382°W
- Area: 0.75 acres (3,000 m^{2})
- NRHP reference No.: 08000711
- Added to NRHP: July 24, 2008

Dutton–Waller Raised Tybee Cottage is a cottage on Tybee Island, Georgia, in Chatham County, Georgia, near Savannah. It is significant as a very well preserved example of a raised Tybee cottage. It is one of few still intact from the "golden era" of Tybee Island's development during 1910–1939, when Tybee Island became a beach house community for Savannah middle-class families.

It was listed on the National Register of Historic Places on July 24, 2008. It is the fourth property that is listed as a featured property of the week in a program of the National Park Service that began in July 2008.

The cottage is located in the Back River area of Tybee Island; there are also historic cottages preserved in the Strand area of the island. Cottages of this type were built from the 1920s through the 1940s as summer homes for the middle class. The Dutton–Waller Raised Tybee Cottage was built as a speculative investment by Edward A. Dutton in 1938. It was purchased in 1940 by Blanche S. Waller. The unpainted interior retains the original, rustic heart-pine paneling and bungalow floor plan. The living space is on the upper floor of the two-story building, with servants' quarters and garage space below. The cottage was remodeled extensively in 2006. It has been refurbished to remove non-historic changes made in the 1950s–1970s and replace historic elements that had been removed. The cottage's significance is enhanced by the fact that it is one of the few such cottages remaining, most having been demolished to make way for much bigger homes in recent times of escalating property values. It is listed as a three-bedroom, two-bathroom home, with an additional sleeping porch. There are live oak trees, jasmine, and palm trees surrounding the house.

== See also ==
- Tybee Island Strand Cottages Historic District
- James and Odessa Rourke, Jr., Raised Tybee Cottage, also NRHP-listed on Tybee Island
