= Wilmington Island, Georgia =

- Unincorporated community Census-designated place
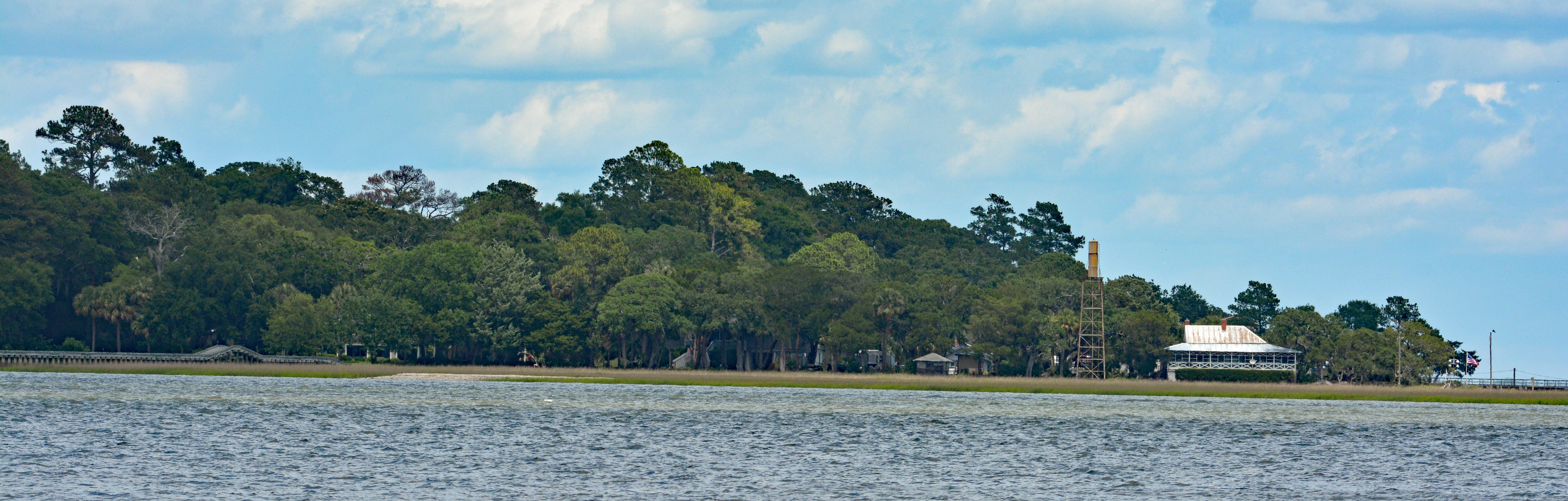
- Wilmington Island as seen from Skidaway Island.Eureka Club-Farr's Point, on the right, is listed on the National Register of Historic Places.

- Location in Chatham County and the state of Georgia
- Coordinates: 32°0′12″N 80°58′31″W
- Country: United States
- State: Georgia
- County: Chatham

Area
  - Total: 9.65 sq mi (24.99 km^{2})
  - Land: 8.30 sq mi (21.50 km^{2})
  - Water: 1.34 sq mi (3.48 km^{2})
- Elevation: 10 ft (3.0 m)

Population (2020)
  - Total: 15,129
  - Density: 1,822.4/sq mi (703.63/km^{2})
- Time zone: UTC-5 (Eastern (EST))
  - Summer (DST): UTC-4 (EDT)
- ZIP code: 31410
- Area code: 912
- FIPS code: 13-83168
- GNIS feature ID: 1867248

Wilmington Island is an unincorporated community and census-designated place (CDP) in Chatham County, Georgia. The population was 15,129 at the time of the 2020 U.S. census. It is part of the Savannah metropolitan area. The communities of Wilmington Island form a large and affluent suburb of Savannah, where most residents work. The island lies east of Savannah between the town of Thunderbolt and the beach city of Tybee Island.

== Geography ==
Wilmington Island is located at 32°00′12″N 80°58′31″W.

According to the United States Census Bureau, the CDP has a total area of 9.5 square miles (24.7 km^{2}), of which 8.2 square miles (21.2 km^{2}) is land and 1.3 square miles (3.4 km^{2}), or 13.94%, is water.

== Demographics ==
Historical population
Census	Pop.	Note	%±
1970	3,284		—
1980	7,546		129.8%
1990	11,230		48.8%
2000	14,213		26.6%
2010	15,138		6.5%
2020	15,129		−0.1%
U.S. Decennial Census; 1850-1870 1870-1880; 1890-1910 1920-1930; 1940 1950 1960; 1970 1980 1990; 2000 2010 2020

Wilmington Island first appeared as a census designated place in the 1970 U.S. census.

=== Racial and ethnic composition ===
Wilmington Island, Georgia – Racial and ethnic composition Note: the US Census treats Hispanic/Latino as an ethnic category. This table excludes Latinos from the racial categories and assigns them to a separate category. Hispanics/Latinos may be of any race.
Race / Ethnicity (NH = Non-Hispanic)	Pop 2000	Pop 2010	Pop 2020	% 2000	% 2010	% 2020
White alone (NH)	12,969	13,477	13,052	91.25%	89.03%	86.27%
Black or African American alone (NH)	559	553	406	3.93%	3.65%	2.68%
Native American or Alaska Native alone (NH)	15	32	23	0.11%	0.21%	0.15%
Asian alone (NH)	355	393	444	2.50%	2.60%	2.93%
Pacific Islander alone (NH)	4	2	8	0.03%	0.01%	0.05%
Some Other Race alone (NH)	21	20	55	0.15%	0.13%	0.36%
Mixed race or Multiracial (NH)	102	197	599	0.72%	1.30%	3.96%
Hispanic or Latino (any race)	188	464	542	1.32%	3.07%	3.58%
Total	14,213	15,138	15,129	100.00%	100.00%	100.00%

=== 2020 census ===
As of the 2020 census, Wilmington Island had a population of 15,129. The median age was 45.1 years. 20.2% of residents were under the age of 18 and 21.1% of residents were 65 years of age or older. For every 100 females there were 93.5 males, and for every 100 females age 18 and over there were 90.1 males age 18 and over.

98.3% of residents lived in urban areas, while 1.7% lived in rural areas.

There were 6,381 households, including 4,322 family households, in Wilmington Island, and 27.3% of households had children under the age of 18 living in them. Of all households, 52.2% were married-couple households, 15.2% were households with a male householder and no spouse or partner present, and 26.9% were households with a female householder and no spouse or partner present. About 28.2% of all households were made up of individuals, and 13.2% had someone living alone who was 65 years of age or older.

There were 6,851 housing units, of which 6.9% were vacant. The homeowner vacancy rate was 2.1% and the rental vacancy rate was 7.7%.

== Education ==
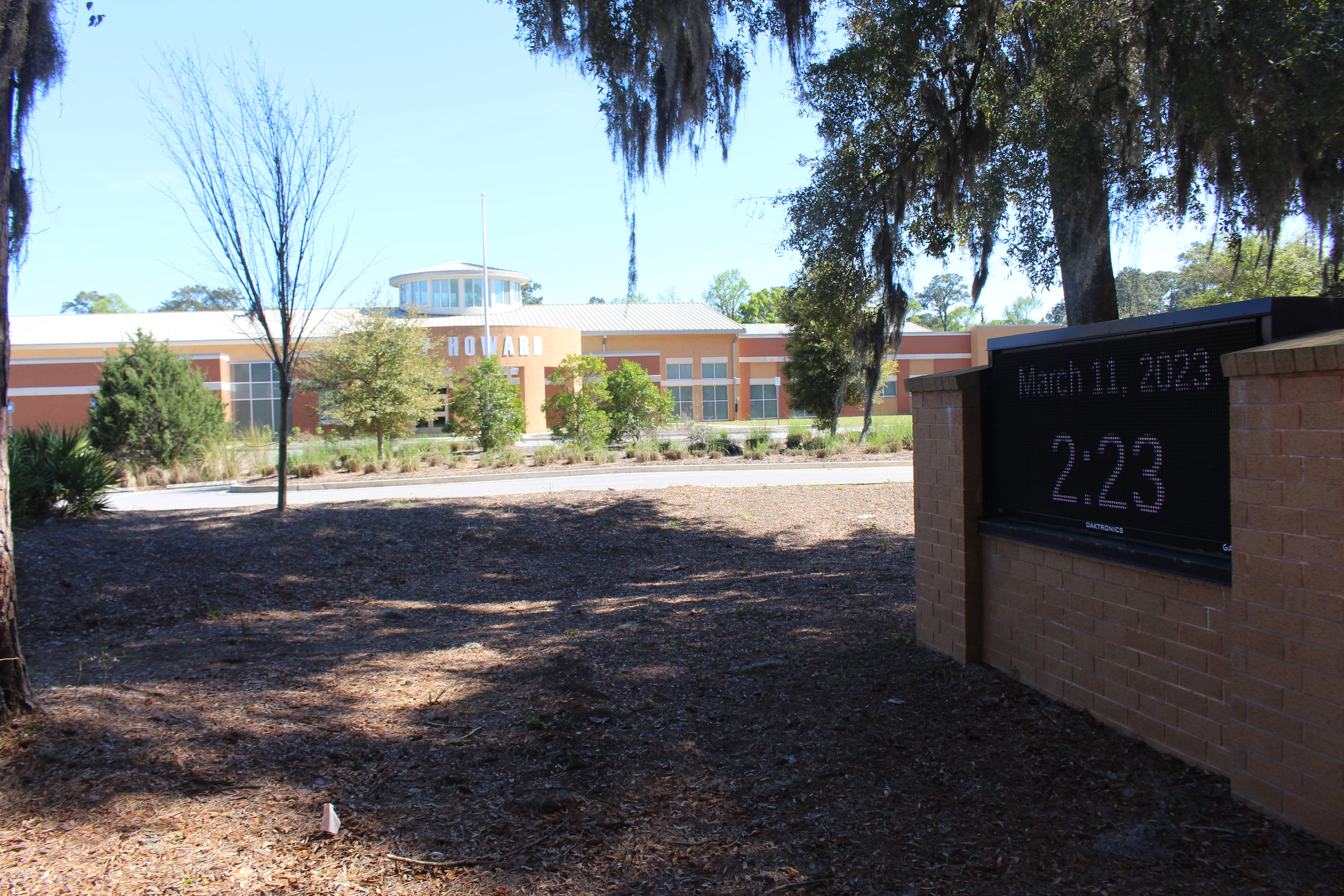
May Howard Elementary School

The only public school on Wilmington Island is May Howard Elementary School, run by Savannah-Chatham County Public Schools. Students often attend school on nearby Whitemarsh Island.

The island hosts two private schools, being St. Andrews School, which is an independent college preparatory school and the Catholic Saint Peter the Apostle School, formerly named Nativity of Our Lord School.

== Gallery ==
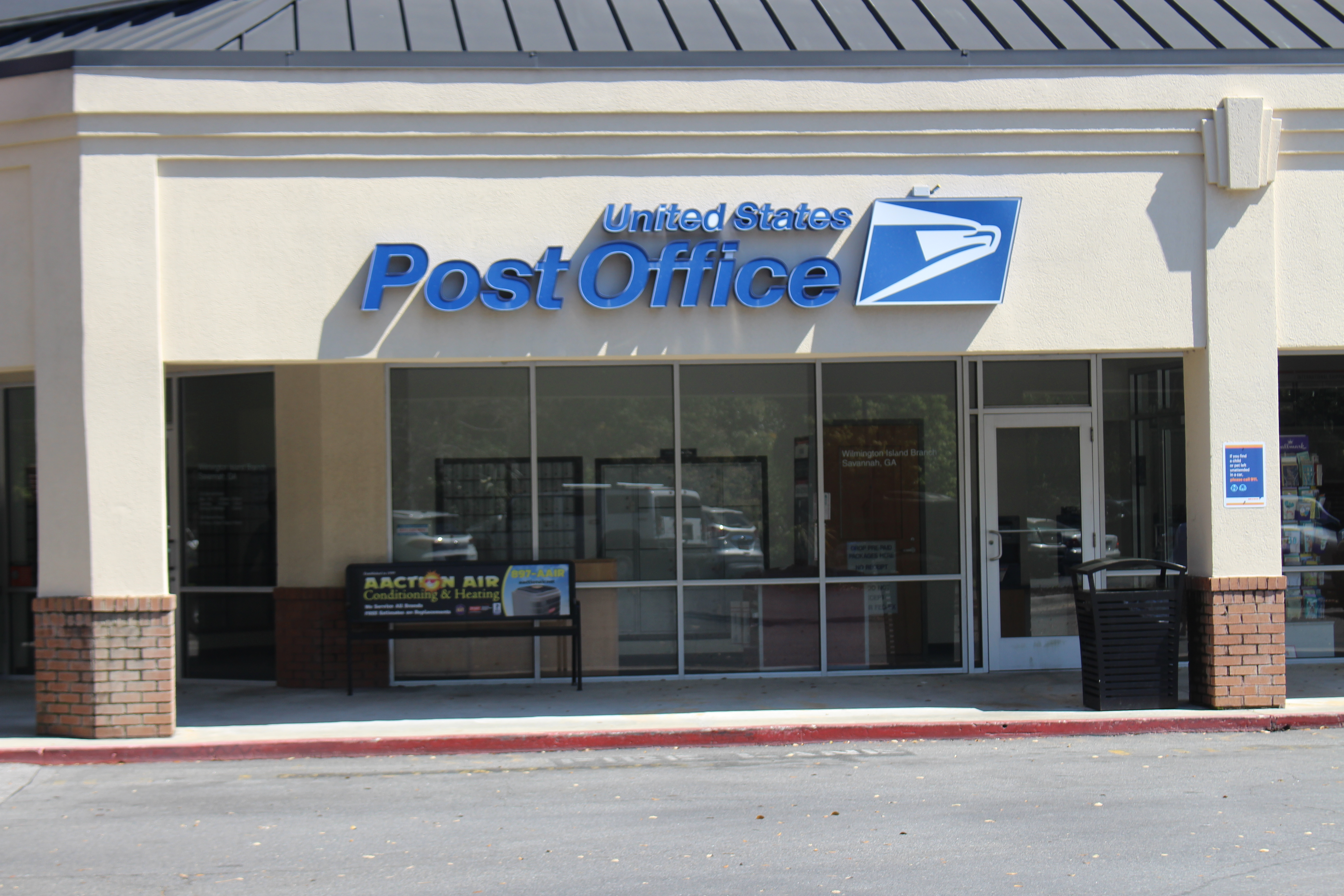
Wilmington Island Post Office

== See also ==
- Wilmington River (Georgia)
