= Tybee Island Strand Cottages Historic District =

Historic district in Georgia, United States

- U.S. National Register of Historic Places
- U.S. Historic district
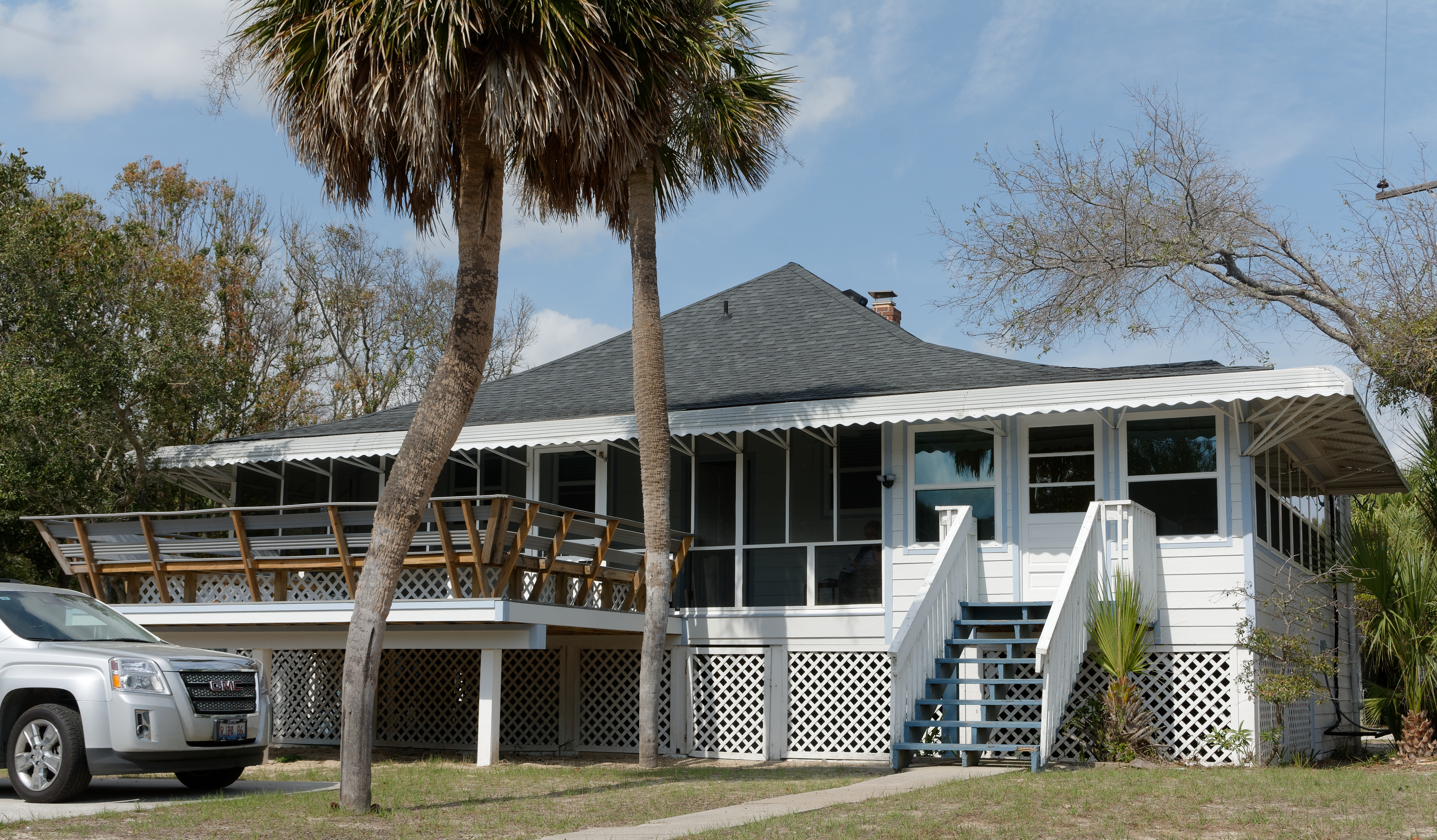
- Sims Cottage at 5 13th St.

- Location within Georgia Location within the United States
- Location: Selected properties between Butler Ave. and the Atlantic Ocean, between 12 St. and 14th St., Tybee Island, Georgia
- Coordinates: 31°59′47″N 80°50′49″W
- Built: 1873
- Built by: Solomon, AP, Sr.; Furse, David Thomas, et al.
- NRHP reference No.: 98000971
- Added to NRHP: April 2, 1999

Tybee Island Strand Cottages Historic District, also known as The Strand, is a historic district on Tybee Island, Georgia including 18 cottages, walkways, landscape and other features that are largely unchanged since the historic era of Tybee Island as a coastal resort. The district was listed on the National Register of Historic Places in 1999.

The district includes portions of what were lots 73 through 84 of the Tybee Improvement Company, which purchased the island in 1873 and subdivided "The Strand" area in that year. It is located between Butler Avenue and the Atlantic Ocean, from a bit past 12th Street to 14th Street. This is the section between two former hotels, Ocean House at the north and Tybee Hotel at the south. Besides the cottages, two other contributing resources of the district were identified: "one historic site consisting of the overall coastal landscape design; and one structure consisting of the entire system of communal walkways and boardwalk." The walkways ran from hotel to hotel through the cottages. The 1873 plan was for each of the 12 narrow lots to contain a single cottage set back at the center of their lots, with a long grassy expanse in a front area and an extensive rear area. A common path crossed the properties at the front steps of the cottages. Since then, multiple cottages have been inserted into most of the lots and most lots have been legally subdivided. However, within the historic district, three lots (77, 80, 81) still conform to their original 1873 plan, two (74, 75) have their original front portions, and one (83) has its original rear area.

Tybee Island is the only coastal resort in Georgia comparable to other examples in the American coastal resort movement such as Cape May, New Jersey, Long Branch, New Jersey, and Nantucket, Massachusetts. The NRHP nomination expands on this:

Tybee Island is the only example of the American coastal resort movement in Georgia. The movement finds its roots in the English coastal resorts of Scarborough and Briton, in which British physicians expounded the virtues of the curative powers of sea water as an 18th-century panacea. By the 19th century, this idea was transplanted to America and gave rise to the coastal resorts along the Atlantic coast. Many Georgians as well as other people throughout the South traveled north to resorts in Long Branch, [New Jersey], Cape May, New Jersey, and Nantucket, Massachusetts. These resorts were popular and set the standard for resorts by offering such amenities as transportation networks, hotels, service-oriented businesses, and amusement establishments. The resort development of Tybee Island was modeled after these resort areas. At the height of its resort popularity, Tybee Island featured grand hotels, dance pavilions, bath houses, boarding houses and inns, service-oriented businesses, railroad stops, and private summer cottages.

"During the mid-19th century, limited recreational activities were provided on Tybee Island; however, visitors had to board a steamer at Savannah and travel over one hour to reach the island. Many people throughout the South had to travel to northern coastal cities to enjoy seaside resorts, which were established during the early 19th century. The development of Tybee Island from limited recreational purposes to a seaside resort was begun in 1873 by the Tybee Improvement Company."

The included houses are (with letter indicating marking on National Register map in NRHP nomination text):

- (R) 1204 Butler Avenue (front house) (Photos 1 and 2 also?) Pierce-McCall Cottage (foreground in photo 1)
- (Q) 1206 Butler Avenue (front house) (c. 1930) a two-story house is one of only two year-round residences built during the historic period within the district. It was built c. 1930 during the period of transition for Tybee Island from a summer resort destination into a permanent community. The NRHP nomination describes that "Even though the building was brick veneered after the historic period, many of its significant features remain. Character-defining features of the residence include paired and single four-over-one double-hung windows (shorter and narrower than found on the summer cottages), hipped roof with full-facade front portico, and a full-width second-story porch. The residence shares the setback as the summer cottages but lacks the raised first floor and wrap- around porch featured on the summer cottages (photos 1 and 2)."
- (P) 1208 Butler Avenue (next to front house), cottage with a garage that is non-contributing
- (O) Cottage at 1208 Butler Avenue (rear) raised Tybee cottage "constructed on raised wooden piers and the character- defining features include a hipped roof, enclosed wrap-around porch, overhanging eaves, rear ell, and garage with lattice doors. The original section of the house features a square massing with an historic ell addition (see photo 3)"
- (N) Rodgers-Fulmer Cottage, 1210 Butler Street, (full lot with house at center) N "is an excellent example of the Strand-cottage type. The wood-framed cottage features a hipped roof with pressed tin shingles, long two-over-two double-hung windows with wooden shutters, a recessed wrap-around porch with an attached gazebo, and rectangular form with a rear ell (see photo 4 and Attachment 3)." Rodgers-Fulmer Cottage, located at 1210 Butler Avenue is one with historic landscape intact. Strand-type cottage, "(see N on National Register Map). "The Rodgers-Fulmer Cottage is located approximately in the center of the long narrow lot. A grassy expanse created between the cottage and the ocean consists of palmetto trees, tall grasses, oak trees, and wax myrtles lining the property lines and filling in the expanse towards the beach. A boardwalk leads from the front porch over the sand dunes towards the beach (see photo 4 and 5)."
- (M) 1 13th St., a cottage that is a non-contributing building
- (L) 3 13th St.
- (K) 5 13th St. Sims Cottage (photo 7)
- (J) 14 13th St.
- (I) Strobhar-Armand Cottage at 13 13th Street (see I on National Register Map) raised Tybee cottage. "The cottage at 1208 Butler Avenue (rear) is The Strobhar-Armand Cottage is an excellent example of the raised Tybee cottage located on the back edge of the lot close to the road, 13th Avenue (see photo 12). The raised Tybee cottages are located near the edge of Butler Avenue and along the alleys (see Attachment 5)." "Strobhar-Delaney Cottage "is an excellent example of this later landscape design. The cottage is situated near the edge of Butler Avenue and the palmetto trees and oak trees are located close to the cottage (see photo 6)."
- (H) 9 13th St.
- (G) 1304 Butler Av.
- (F) Stoker-Furse-Sipple Cottage, 1306 Butler Avenue (see F on National Register Map), another Strand-type cottage with historic landscape intact. "The Stoker-Furse-Sipple Cottage is also situated in the center of its lot with access provided by a drive leading from Butler Street to the back of the cottage (see photo 12). The grassy expanse between the front of the cottage and the beach consists of wax myrtles, tall grasses, and palmetto trees, and sand dunes covered with sea oats and other native vegetation (see photo 9). A boardwalk leads from the front porch to through the grassy expanse to the beach (see photo 10) and a communal walkway is located directly in front of the house (see photo 11)." Stoker-Furse-Sipple Cottage has David Thomas Furse as its builder.
- (E) 8 13th St.
- (D) 1310 Butler Av., a cottage that is a non-contributing building
- (C) 12 14th St.

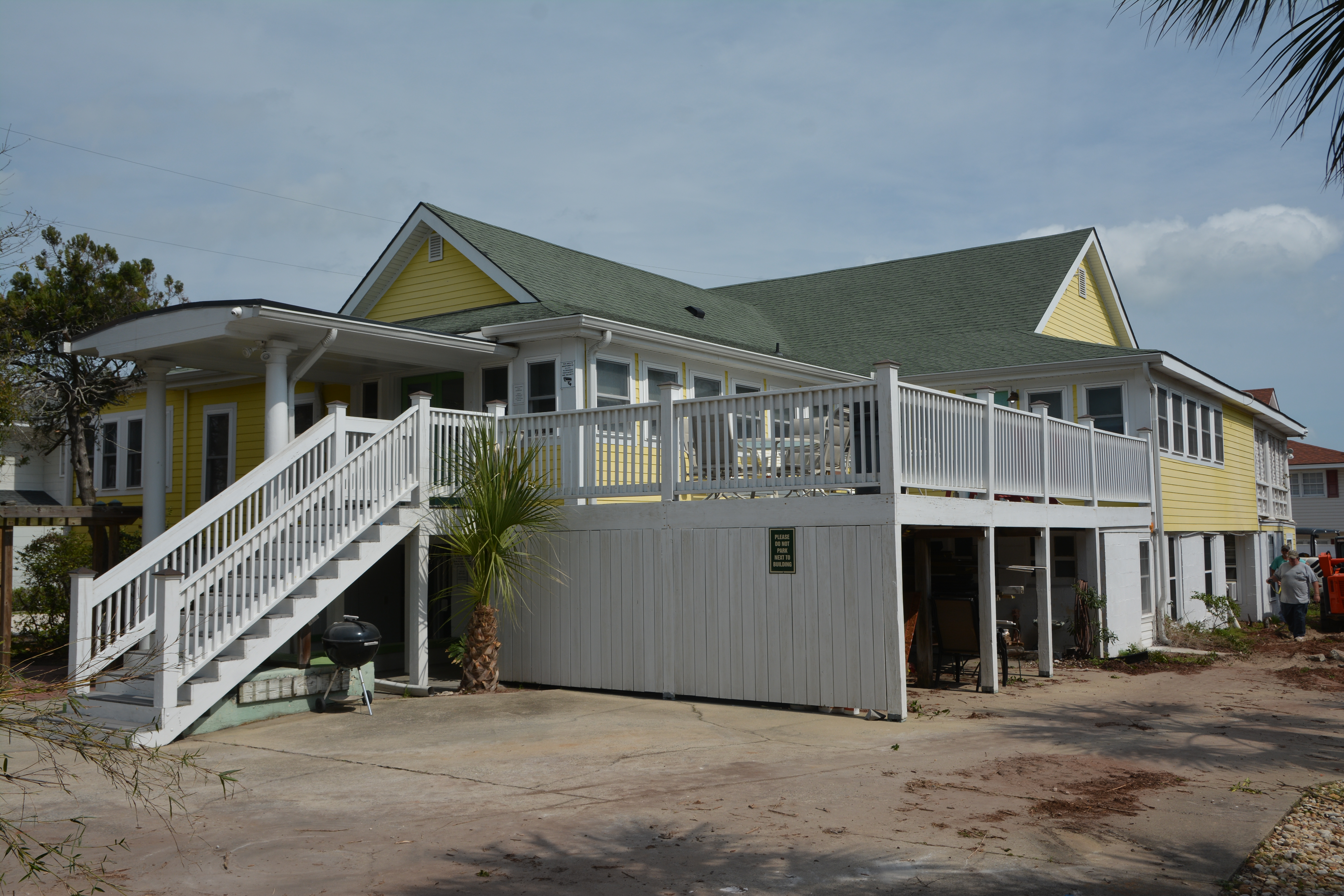
Cummings Cottage/Georgiana Inn, 1312 Butler Ave.

- (B) 1312 Butler Av. Cummings Cottage/Georgiana Inn (1910) "(see B on National Register Map), was one of the earliest dwellings constructed on Tybee Island as a year-round residence. The cottage is larger and original features include an overall side-gable, long, rectangular form unlike the Strand and raised Tybee cottages, porch columns, and long two-over-two double-hung windows. The alterations include an enclosure of part of the wrap-around porch during the 1930s to accommodate bathrooms and the raised basement was partially enclosed with concrete walls during the 1950s (see photo 15)."
- (A) 13 14th St.

Among the above cottages, one is the Middleton-Crawford Cottage, which had AP Solomon Sr. as its builder. And another is the Roberts-Sack-Hickman Cottage, which had George Dutton as its builder.

The district includes three noncontributing resources: "a nonhistoric garage and two significantly altered Strand cottages (see D and M on National Register Map)."

== See also ==
- Dutton-Waller Raised Tybee Cottage
