= Eureka Club-Farr's Point =

- U.S. National Register of Historic Places
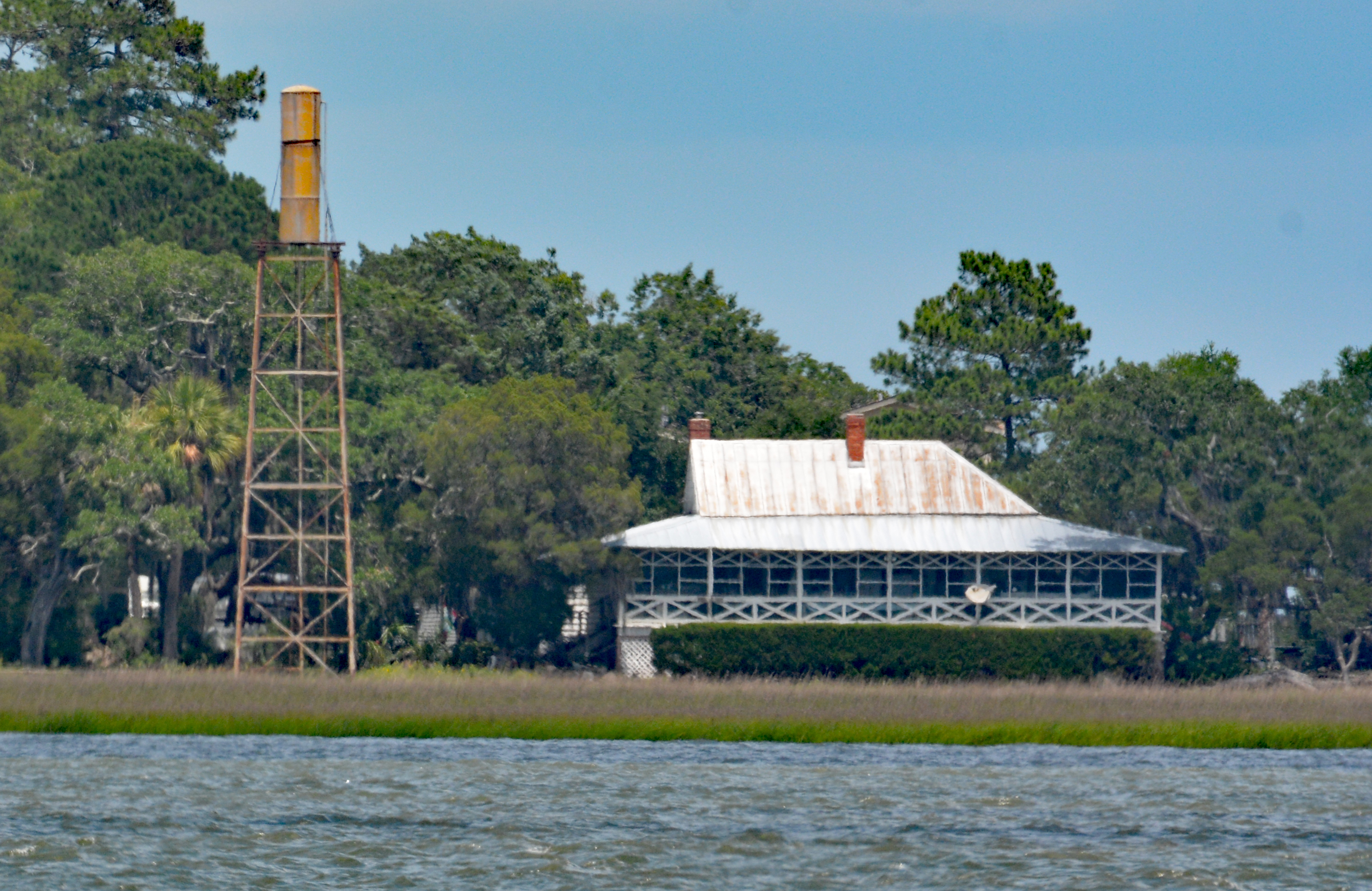
- Viewed from Skidaway Island

- Location within Georgia
- Nearest city: Savannah, Georgia
- Coordinates: 31.97180°N 81.00015°W
- Area: 9.8 acres (4.0 ha)
- Built: 1891
- Architectural style: Coastal resort cottage
- NRHP reference No.: 09000491
- Added to NRHP: July 8, 2009

Eureka Club-Farr's Point is a resort cottage on the southern end of Wilmington Island, Georgia. It overlooks the marshes of the Wilmington River on the west and Sheepsheads Creek (maybe a branch of Halfmoon River) on the east. It was built in 1891 for seasonal use as a club and was later used as a private vacation house.

The one-story main house is L-shaped and has been expanded over the years. It is raised on cedar posts. The two chimneys have corbel caps.

The property includes a small pump house with a cylindrical water tank on a platform.
