= Cockspur Island Light =

Lighthouse in Georgia, USA

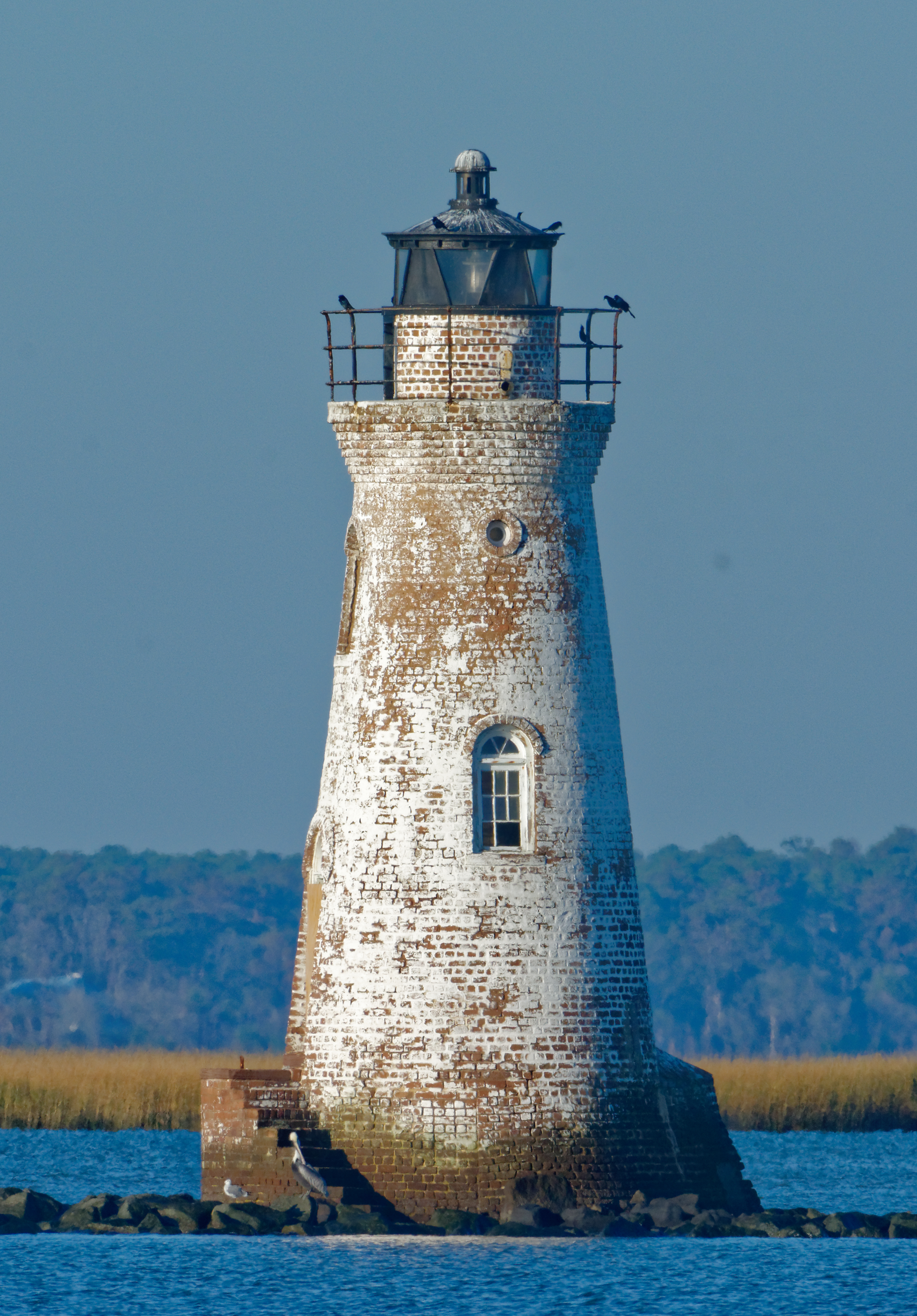
- Cockspur Island Light from the south, not in service
- Location: Chatham County, Georgia, Savannah River, at Lazaretto Creek
- Coordinates: 32°1′21.6″N 80°52′47.8″W

Tower
- Constructed: 1837–1839
- Foundation: wood piles in oyster bed
- Construction: brick
- Automated: no
- Height: 46 feet
- Shape: conical with ship's prow shaped base

Light
- First lit: 1848
- Deactivated: 1909
- Focal height: 12.5 m (41 ft)
- Lens: Fourth-order Fresnel
- Range: 9 miles
- Characteristic: Fl W 4s

The Cockspur Island Light is the smallest lighthouse in Georgia. It ceased operation as an active beacon in 1909. It has been relit since 2007 for historical rather than navigational purposes.

The lighthouse is situated on an islet off Cockspur Island at the south channel of the Savannah River near Lazaretto Creek, northwest of Tybee Island in Chatham County, Georgia. It is part of Fort Pulaski National Monument.

== Features ==
The lighthouse is built on an oyster and mussel bed. This lighthouse is unique in that the base is shaped like the prow of a ship to reduce the impact of the waves on the structure. The lighthouse is not currently open to the public. However, visitors to the area frequently access the water near the beacon by kayak, often taking a commercial tour. The National Park Service cut a trail from Fort Pulaski National Monument to the lighthouse through the brush in 2005 to allow visitors a closer vantage point. The trail begins on the northeast side of the fort and is about 0.8 mile (1.3 km) long. At low tide, hikers can get within approximately 200 yards (180 m) of the lighthouse.

== History ==
This lighthouse was initially built as a daymarker without lights to indicate the entrance to the South Channel of the Savannah River. Construction lasted from March 1837 to November 1839. By 1848 it was retrofitted with lights and reflectors. It housed a fixed white light from five lamps with 14 inch reflectors that shone 9 miles (14 km) at a height of 25 feet (7.6 m) above sea level. It was damaged by a hurricane in 1854. The larger replacement that was built in 1855 on the same foundation was designed by New York City architect John S. Norris.

The light was extinguished for a time during the American Civil War during the battle that brought the defeat of Fort Pulaski. The lighthouse suffered little or no damage, even though it was in direct line of fire. It was relit in 1866.

On June 1, 1909, the light was finally extinguished, because the south channel was infrequently used, compared to the deeper and wider North Channel of the Savannah River. The United States Coast Guard relinquished control of this lighthouse to the National Park Service on August 14, 1958. Along with the entire National Monument, the lighthouse is listed on the National Register of Historic Places. Starting in 1995 and lasting until 2000, the upper portions of the lighthouse were restored, although the foundations still require protection from wave action and tidal erosion.

On March 18, 2007 at 7:30 p.m. the lighthouse was relit in a ceremony hosted by the National Park Service and the U.S. Coast Guard.

In early 2013 additional rocks were added around the lighthouse to protect it from strong currents at high tide.

== Photos ==
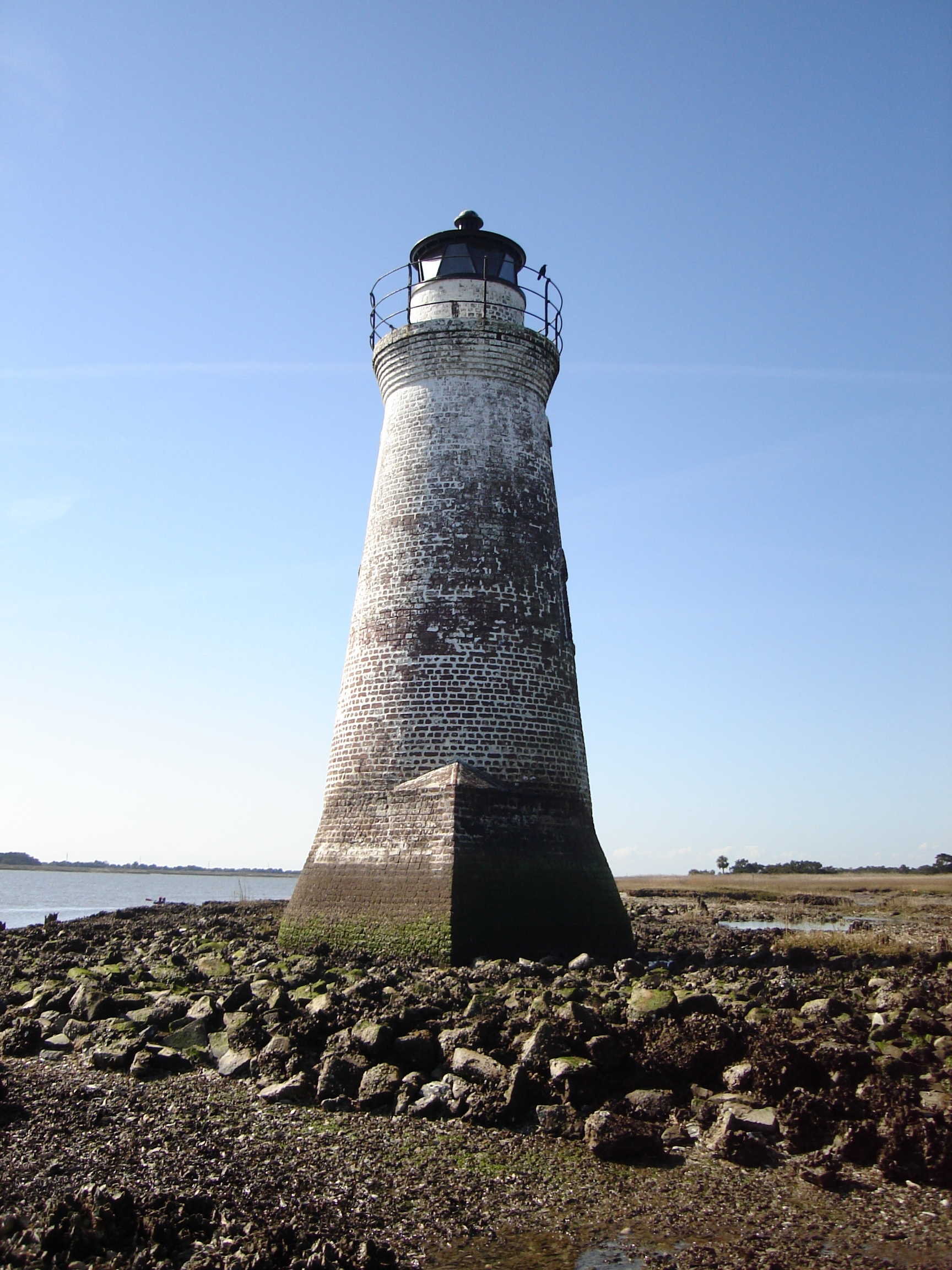

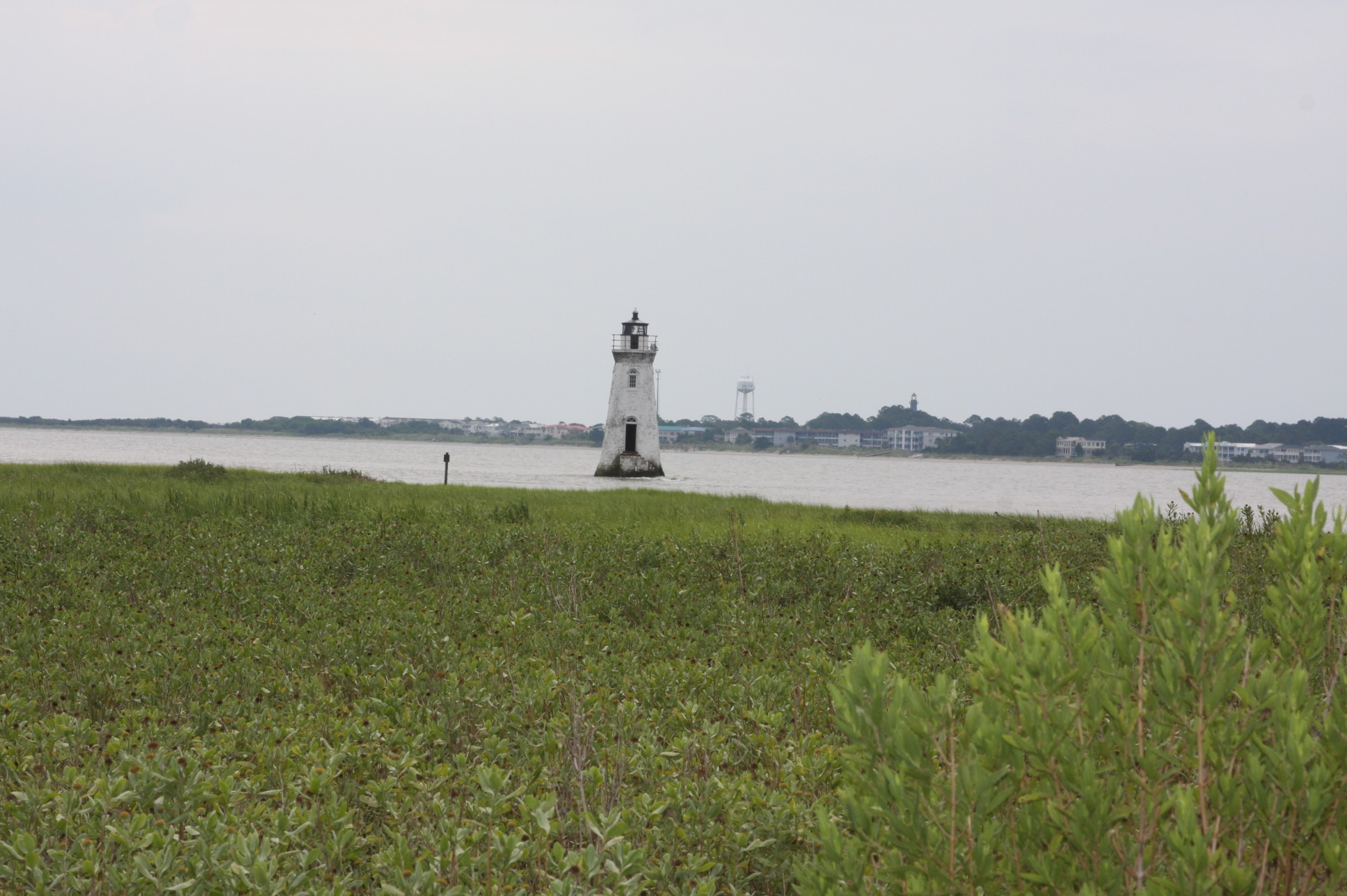

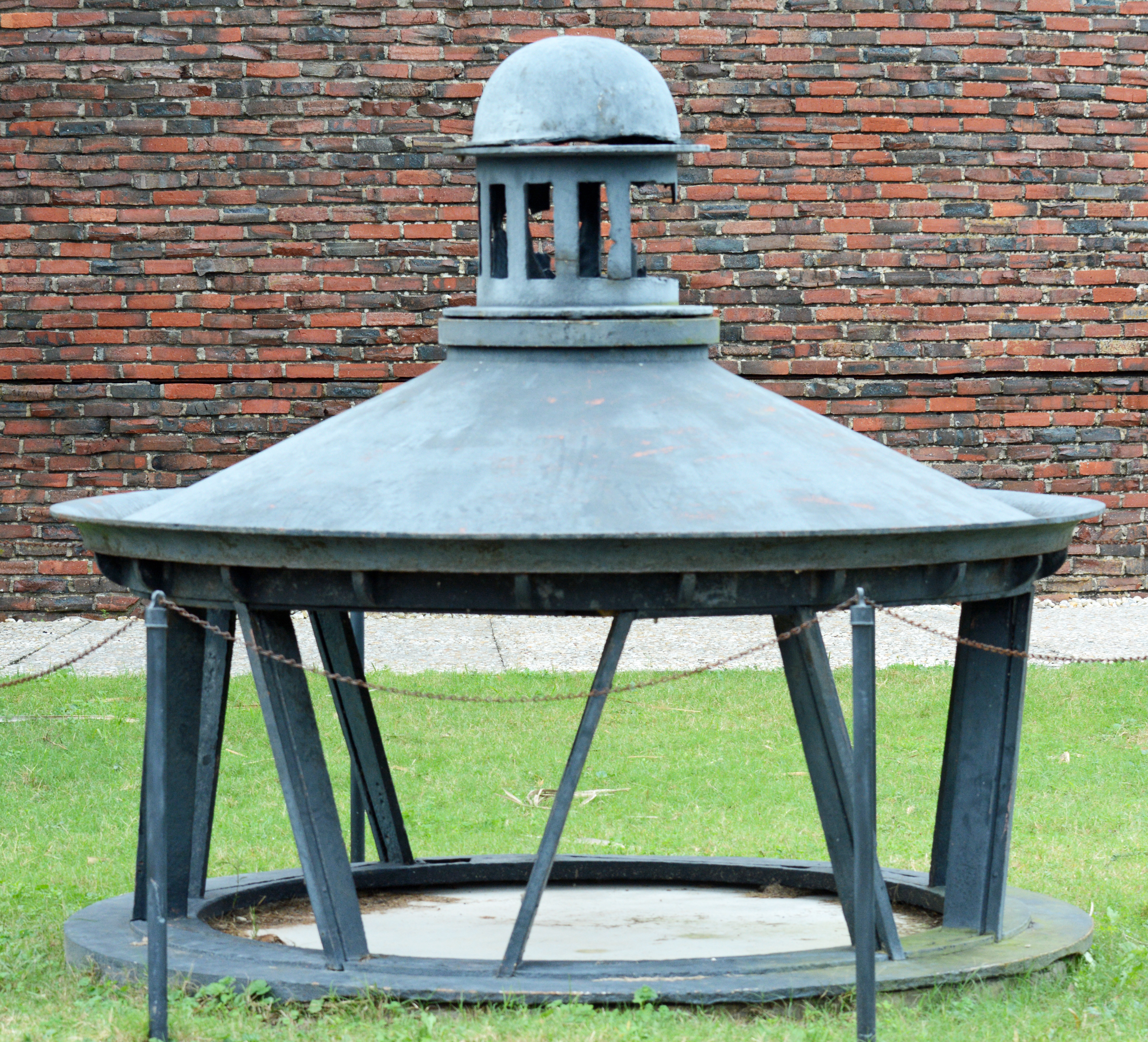
The original cap

== See also ==
- Florence Martus, The Waving Girl, famous sister of the lighthouse keeper.
