= J. Ogden Murray =

Confederate major & writer (c.1840–1921)

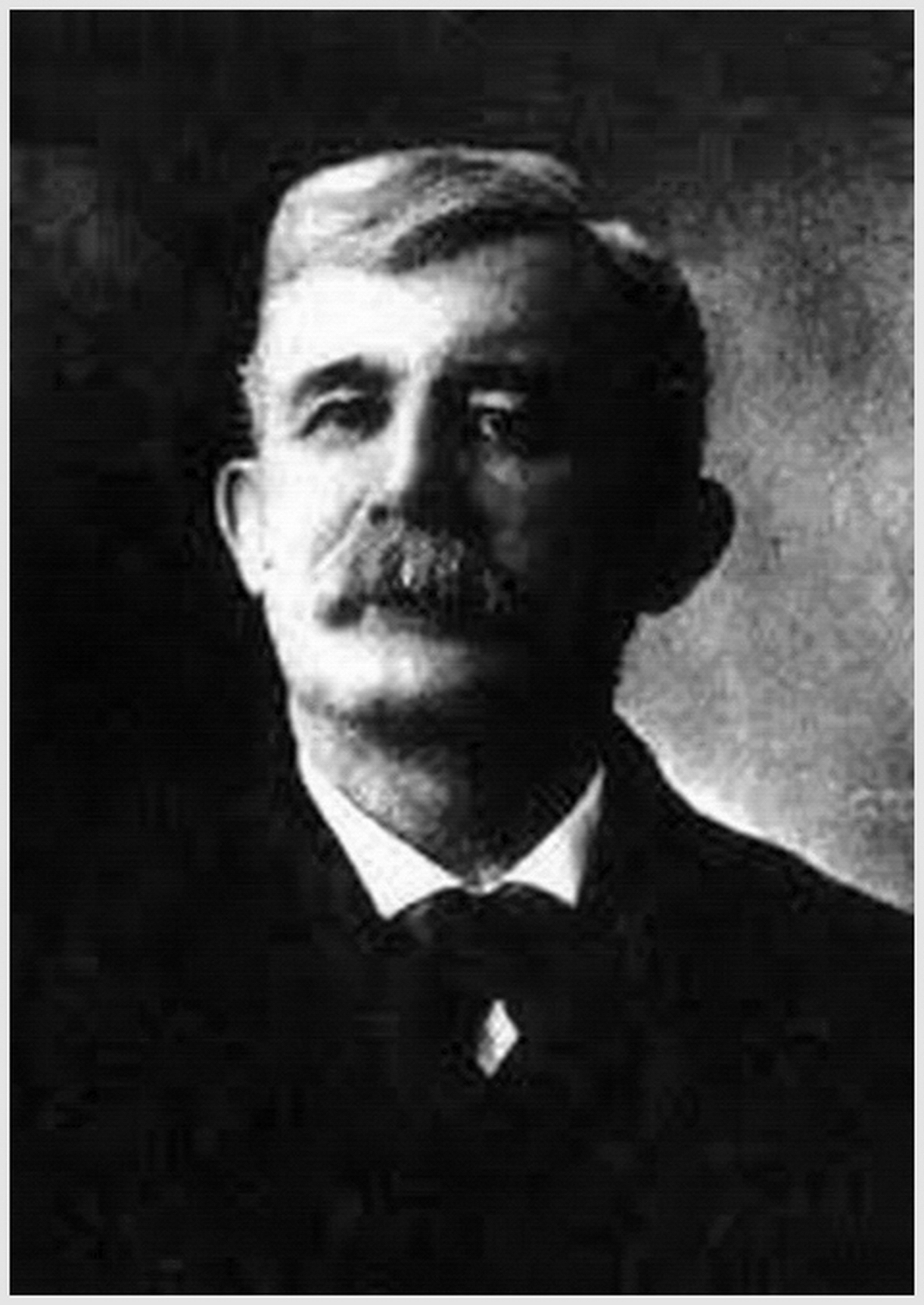

John Ogden Murray (c. 1840 – 1921) was a major in the Confederate Army, an author, and a newspaper editor. He is credited with coining the phrase "Immortal Six Hundred." He wrote a firsthand account of Confederate prisoners of war. The Virginia Museum of History and Culture has a collection of his papers.

He wrote about a planned exchange of prisoners being halted by Union military commander Ulysses S. Grant. According to Ogden, prisoner exchanges were officially halted in July 1863, due to Confederate refusal to include black prisoners of war, but some generals continued arranging unofficial exchanges.

His scrapbook is part of the West Virginia University's library collection as newspaper articles written by Edward H. Sims, ca. 1949 based on Murray's book.

== Bibliography ==
- The Immortal Six Hundred; A Story of Cruelty to Confederate Prisoners of War (1905) (Full text at the Internet Archive)
- Confederate Sketches: The Southern Statesman, The Confederate Soldier, The South's Peerless Women
- Jefferson Davis and the Southern People were not traitors, nor Rebels

== See also ==
- Lost Cause of the Confederacy
- Dunning School
