= Lazaretto Creek =

- Etymology: Italian: Quarantine

Location
- Country: United States
- State: Georgia
- Region: Chatham County

Physical characteristics
- Source: Savannah River
  - location: Chatham County, Georgia, United States
  - coordinates: 31°59′30″N 80°57′45″W
- Mouth: Atlantic Ocean
  - location: Chatham County, Georgia, Georgia, United States
  - coordinates: 32°1′0″N 80°53′0″W

Lazaretto Creek is a small tidal river in Chatham County, Georgia. It divides Tybee Island from McQueens Island.

== History ==
Georgia's original charter contained an antislavery provision reflective of founder Gen. James E. Oglethorpe's opposition to the "peculiar" institution. Seeing the possible profits from the use of slave labor, however, Georgia's planters in 1749 repealed the anti-slavery provision, and passed legislation to legalise slavery in the colony of Georgia.

This legislation ordered a quarantine station, or lazaretto, to be erected on Tybee Island. The station would later be built on the Tybee's western tip, using the 100 acres (40 ha) Josiah Tattnall purchased in 1767. Several hospitals were there constructed over the following year, where voyagers arriving ill could receive treatment, or an unmarked burial should they die while in quarantine.

The lazaretto on Tybee remained in use until 1785, at which point it was relocated to and rebuilt on nearby Cockspur Island, owing to the state of disrepair of the original buildings.

Lazaretto creek, which gets its name from the original hospital facility, stands as a tribute to this institution.

== Present day ==
Today, Lazaretto Creek is crossed by U.S. Route 80, and is also popular as a fishing spot and kayaking route.
