= Cockspur Island =

Island in Georgia, United States

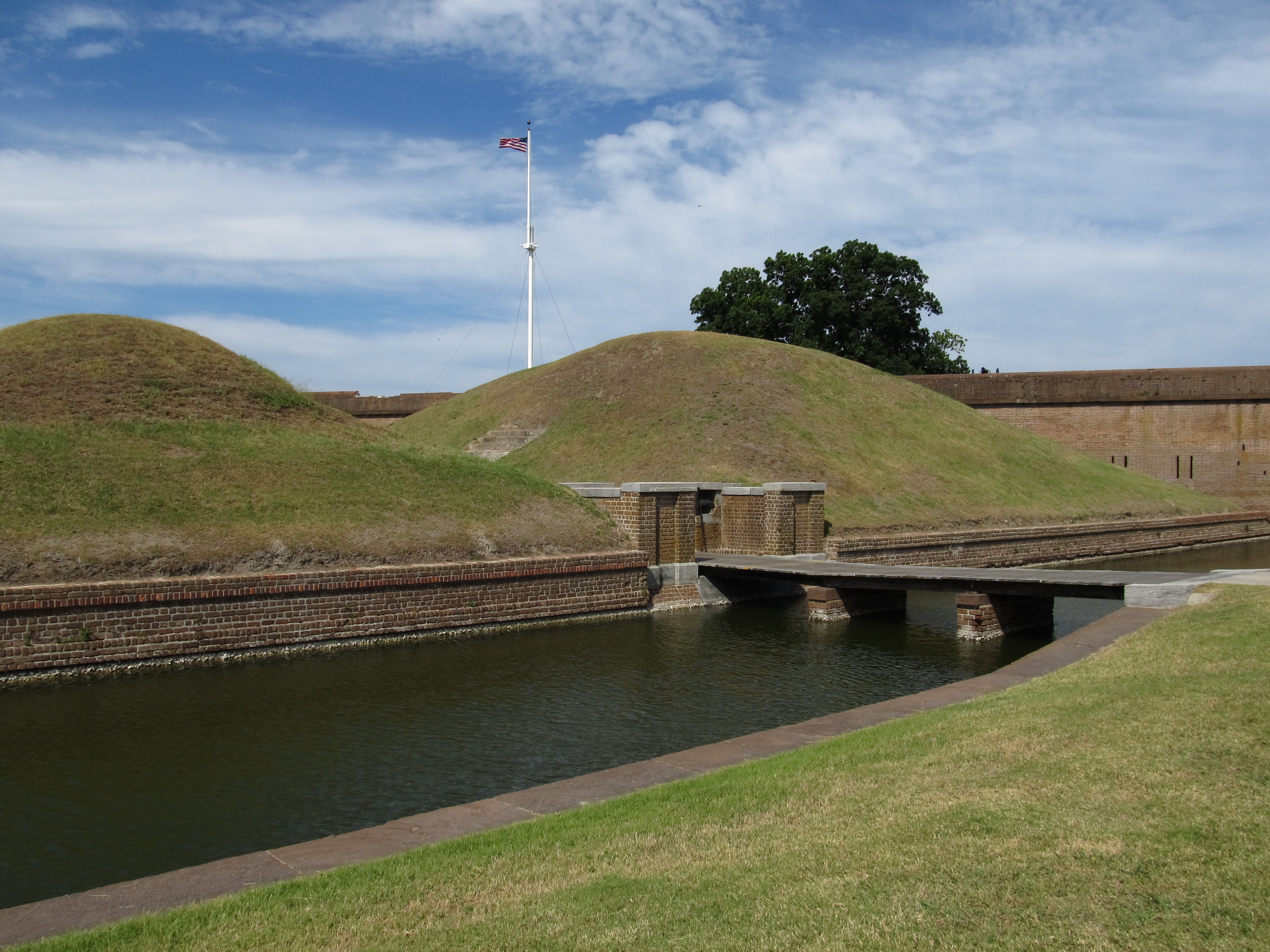
- Entrance to the Demilune, Fort Pulaski National Monument, Cockspur Island, Georgia.

- Cockspur Island Cockspur Island (North Atlantic)

Geography
- Location: North Atlantic
- Coordinates: 32°1′40″N 80°53′54″W

Administration
- United States
- County: Chatham County, Georgia

Cockspur Island is an island in the south channel of the Savannah River near Lazaretto Creek, northwest of Tybee Island, Georgia, United States. Most of the island is within the boundaries of Fort Pulaski National Monument. The island was so named on account of its bent shape. It was originally called Pepper Island and is also called Long Island.

Historic buildings on the island include Fort Pulaski (built in 1847) and the Cockspur Island Lighthouse (built in 1837–39), designed by John S. Norris, the New York City architect.

== History ==
The founder of Methodism, John Wesley landed at the island on February 6, 1736, and a monument marks the spot where Wesley conducted a service of thanksgiving.

Cockspur was the rendezvous for ships in the fledgling American Navy moored at Charles Town in March 1776 who hoped to intercept and capture British merchant ships going from Jamaica to England as reported by Governor Thomas Hutchinson.

During the American Civil War, the Battle of Fort Pulaski was fought on the island, in which the United States Army captured the fort from the Confederate States Army on April 11, 1862. Confederate soldiers were imprisoned in the fort. During the Spanish–American War, a coastal artillery battery, Battery Hambright, was built on the island; it was reactivated during World War I and World War II. The Emancipation Proclamation, issued on January 1. 1863, established that all enslaved people in Conferderate states in rebellion against the Union"shall be then, thenceforward, and forever free." But for many enslaved people, emancipation took longer to take effect. There is a photo of enslaved people outside their quarters on a plantation on Cockspur Island, Georgia, circa 1863.

== Photos ==
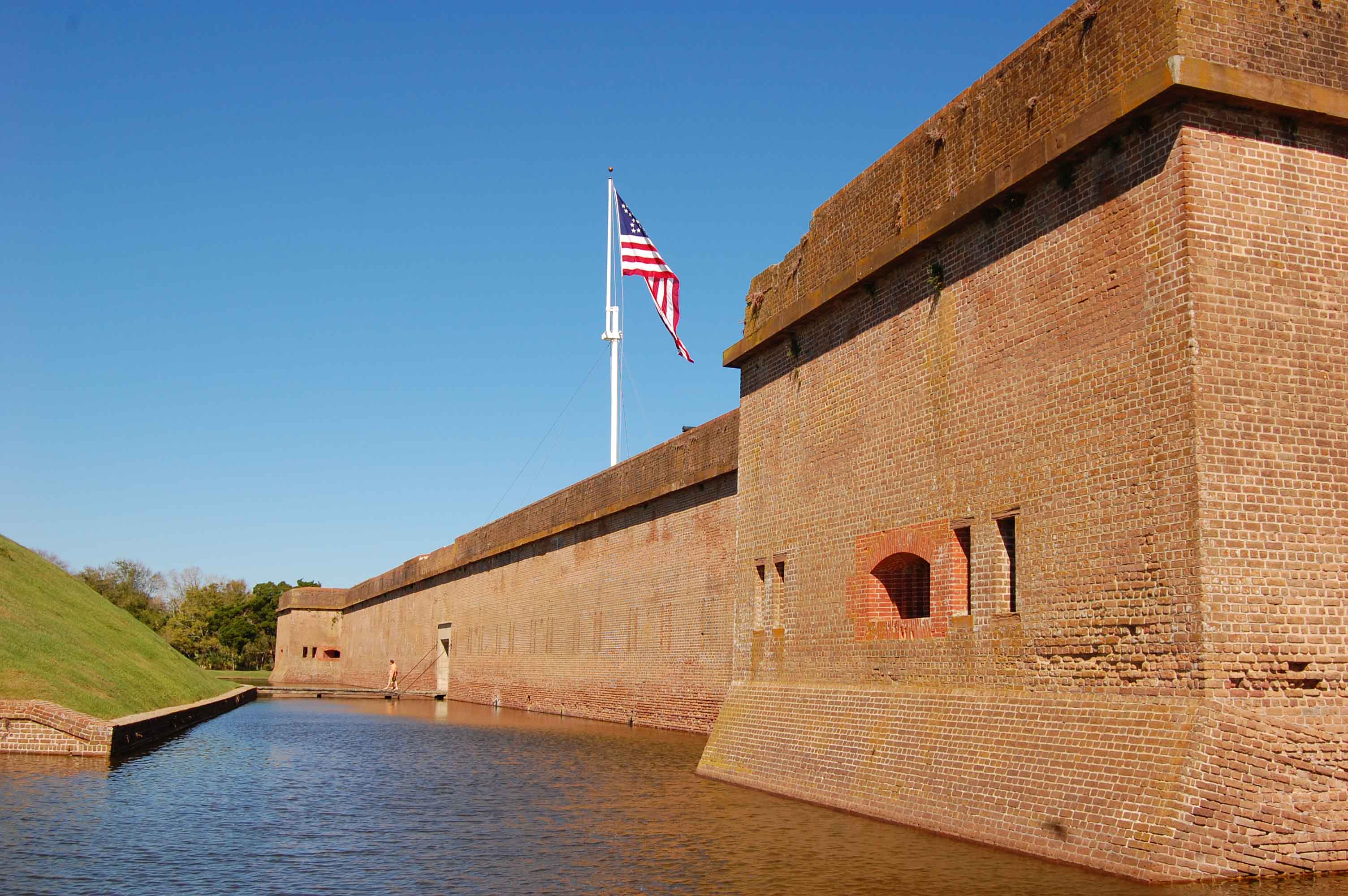
Fort Pulaski

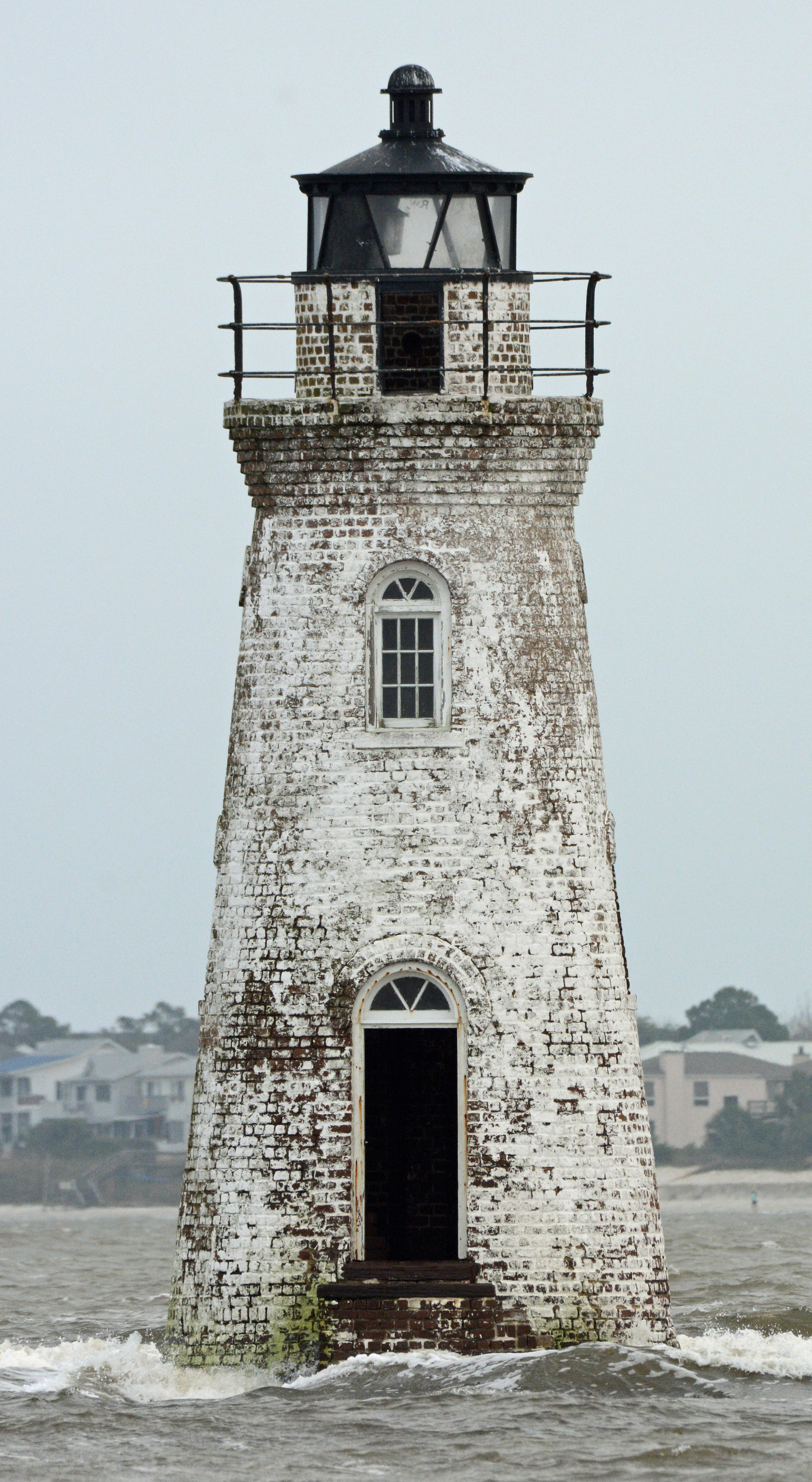
Cockspur Island Lighthouse

The monument erected on the island where John Wesley first landed in America.

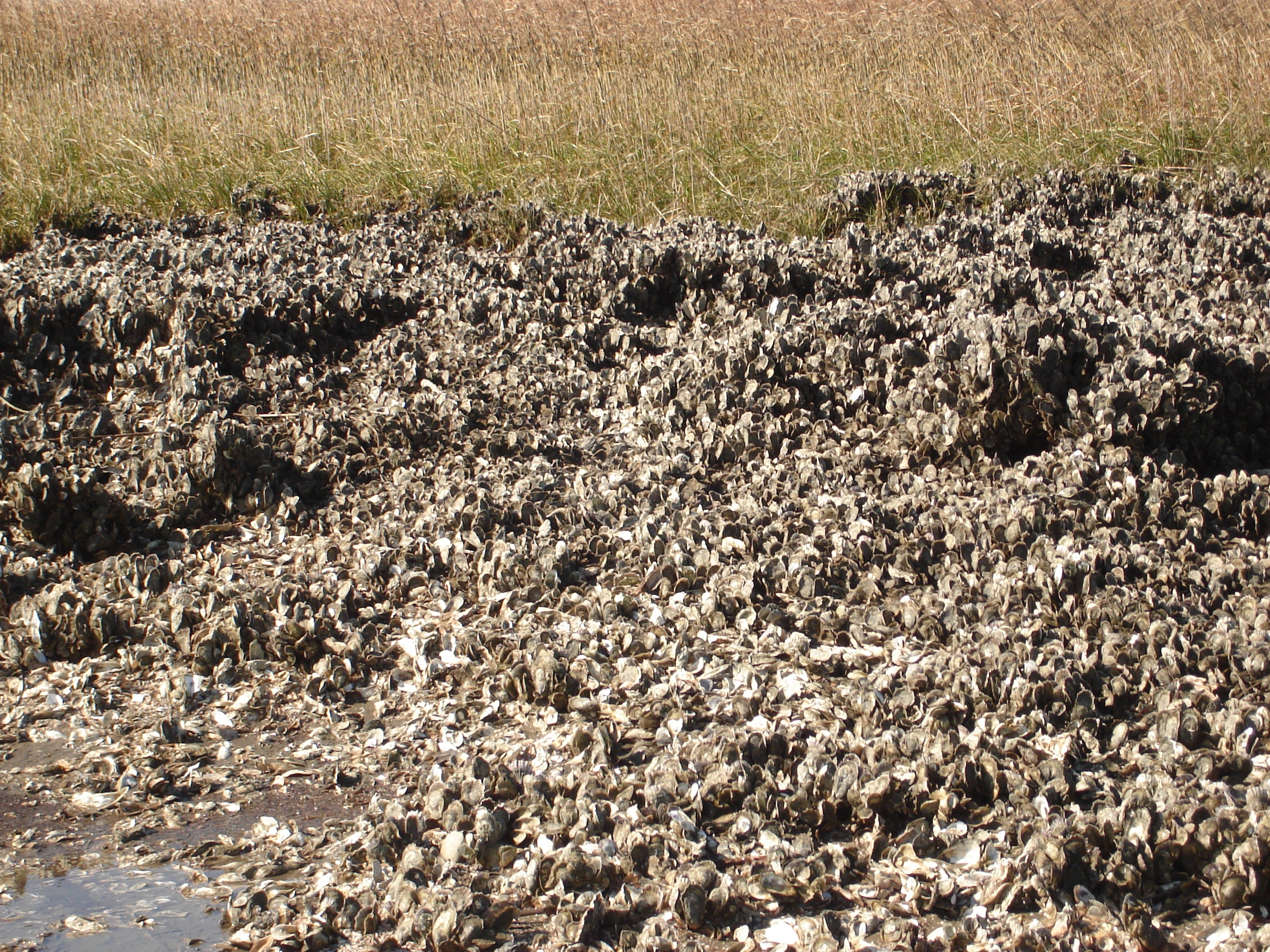
Oyster bed on Cockspur Island

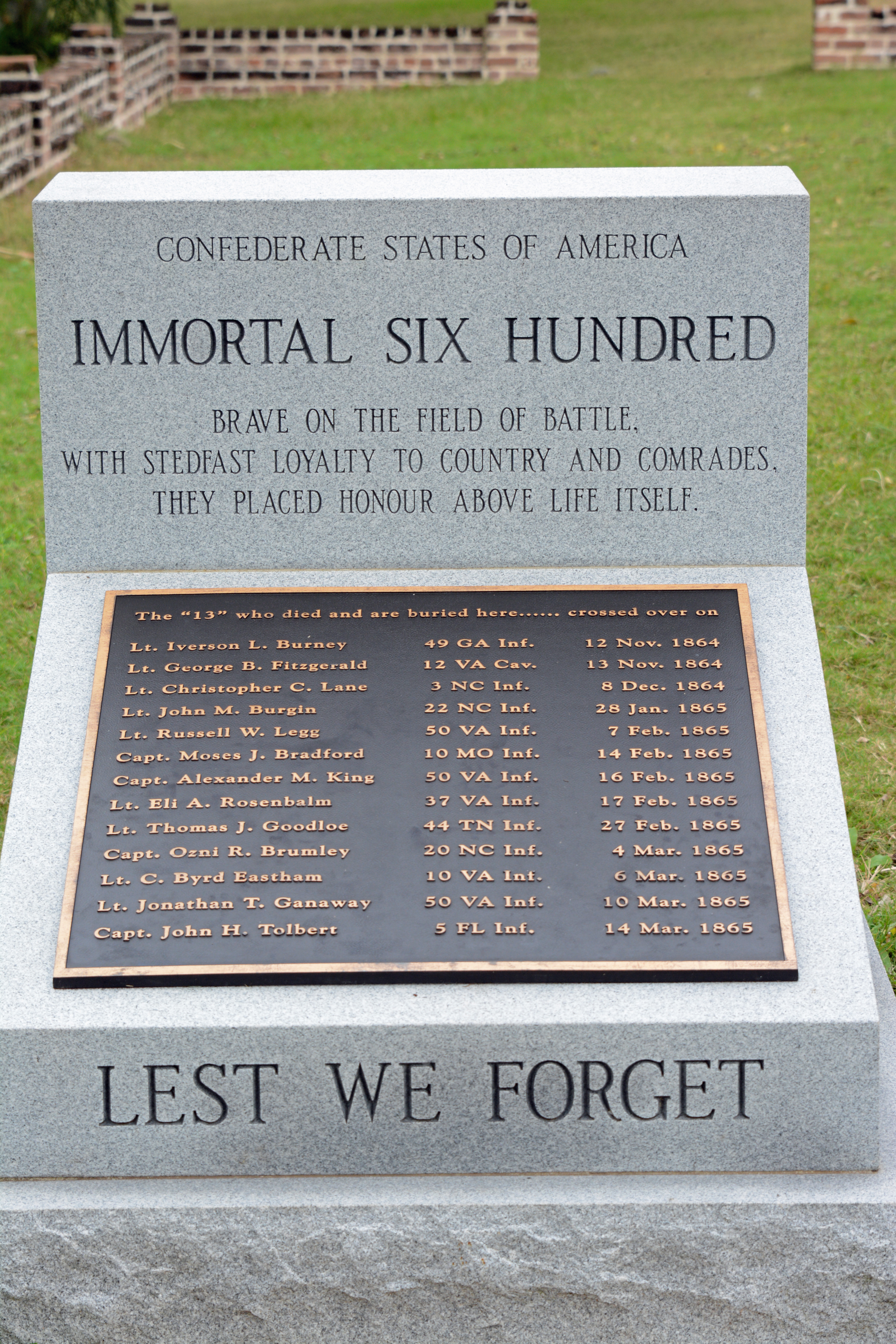
Immortal Six Hundred memorial
