= Fort Pulaski National Monument =

Monument in Georgia, US

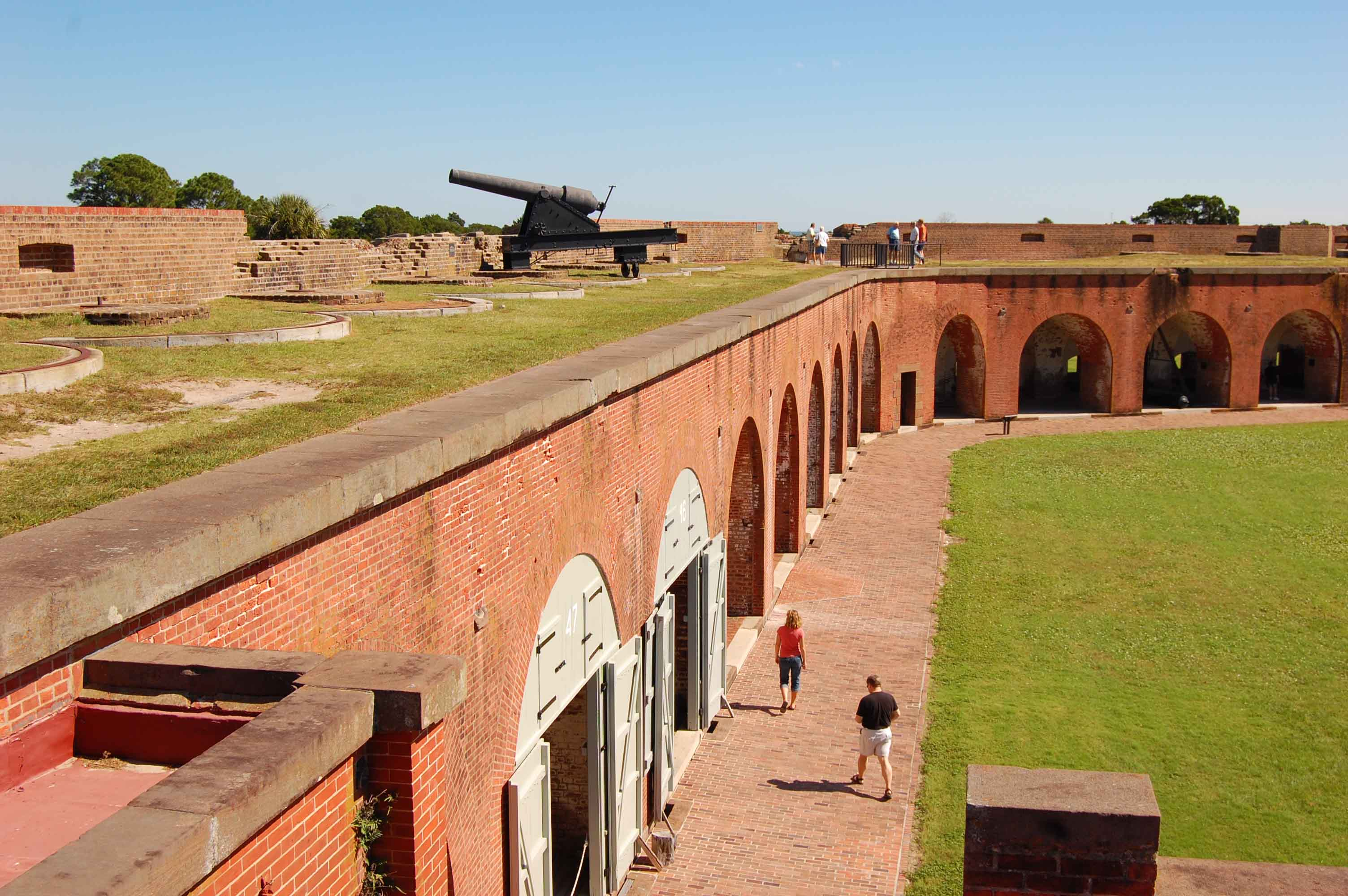

- Location within Georgia Location within the United States
- Interactive map of Fort Pulaski National Monument
- Location: Chatham County, Georgia, USA
- Nearest city: Savannah, Georgia
- Coordinates: 32°1′38″N 80°53′25″W
- Area: 5,623 acres (22.76 km^{2})
- Created: October 15, 1924
- Visitors: 320,926 (in 2025)
- Governing body: National Park Service
- Website: Fort Pulaski National Monument
- Fort Pulaski National Monument
- U.S. National Register of Historic Places
- U.S. Historic district
- Area: 260 acres (105.2 ha)
- Built: 1847
- Architect: Bernard, Simon
- NRHP reference No.: 66000064
- Added to NRHP: October 15, 1966

Fort Pulaski National Monument is located on Cockspur Island between Savannah and Tybee Island, Georgia. It preserves Fort Pulaski, the place where the Union Army successfully tested rifled cannons in 1862, the success of which rendered brick fortifications obsolete. The fort was also used as a prisoner-of-war camp.

The national monument includes most of Cockspur Island (containing the fort) and all of the adjacent McQueens Island.

== Construction ==
After the War of 1812, US President James Madison ordered a new system of coastal fortifications to protect the United States from a foreign invasion. Construction of a fort to protect the port of Savannah began in 1829 under the direction of Major Samuel Babcock and later Second Lieutenant Robert E. Lee, a recent graduate of West Point. The new fort would be on Cockspur Island, at the mouth of the Savannah River. In 1833, the facility was named Fort Pulaski in honor of Casimir Pulaski, a Polish soldier and military commander who fought during the American Revolution under the command of George Washington. Pulaski was a noted cavalryman, played a large role in training Revolutionary troops, and took part in sieges at Charleston and Savannah.

Fort Pulaski belonged to what is known as the Third System of coastal fortifications, which were characterized by greater structural durability than the earlier works. Most of the nearly 30 Third System forts built after 1816 still exist along the Atlantic and the Gulf Coasts.

Wooden pilings were sunk up to 70 feet (21.3 m) into the mud to support an estimated 25 million bricks. Fort Pulaski was finally completed in 1847, after 18 years of construction and nearly $1 million (~$28.5 million in 2024) in construction costs.

Walls were 11 feet thick and were thought to be impenetrable except by only the largest land artillery. The smoothbore cannon of the time had a range of only around half a mile, and the nearest land (Tybee Island) was much further away than that. It was assumed that the fort would be invincible to enemy attack. In reference to the fort's strength, United States Chief of Engineers, General Totten, remarked that "you might as well bombard the Rocky Mountains."

== Civil War ==
Fort Pulaski was used as Confederate prison camp from 1861 to 1862.

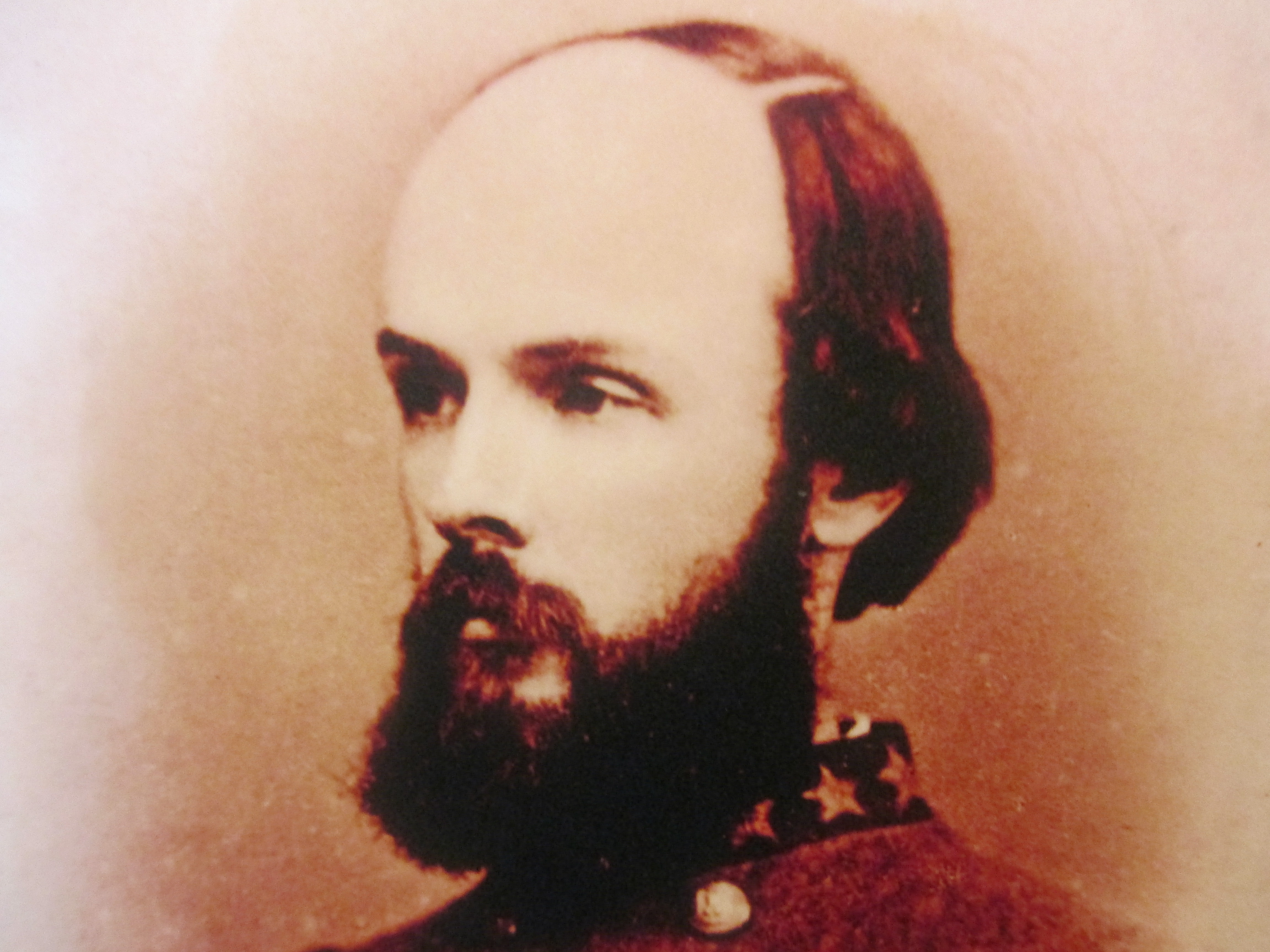
Col. Charles H. Olmstead

Though completed in 1847, Fort Pulaski was under the control of only two caretakers until 1860, when South Carolina seceded from the United States and set in motion the Civil War. Georgia Governor Joseph E. Brown ordered Fort Pulaski to be taken by his state. A steamship carrying 110 men from Savannah traveled downriver, and the fort was seized by the state. After the secession of Georgia in February 1861, the state joined the Confederate States of America, and Confederate troops moved into the fort.

By December 1861, Tybee Island was thought to be too isolated and unprepared for conflict and so was abandoned by Confederate forces. This allowed Union troops to gain a foothold across the Savannah River from Fort Pulaski. Union forces, under Quincy A. Gillmore, began constructing batteries along the beaches of Tybee Island.

=== Confederate fort ===
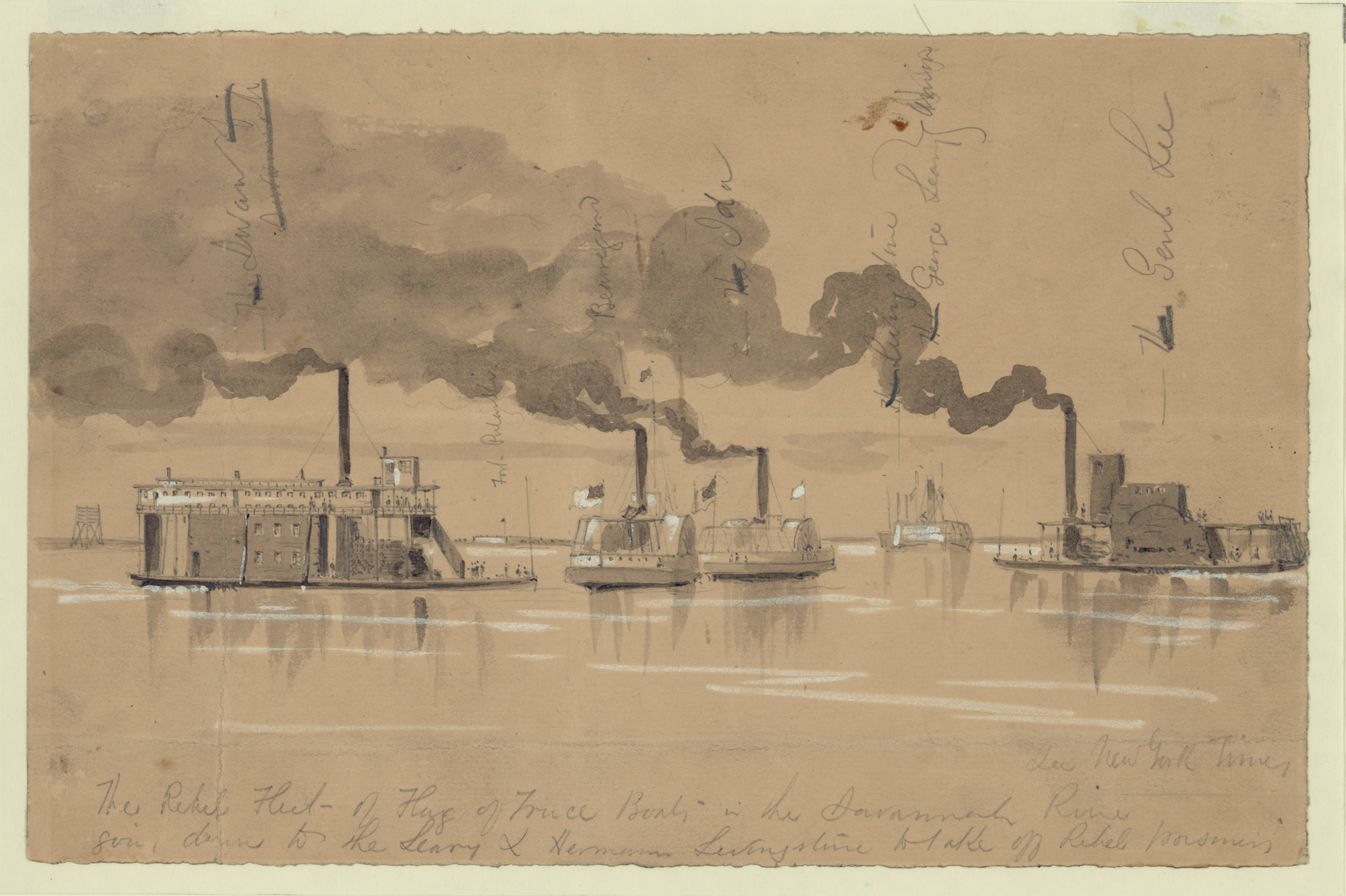
CSS Livingston (misspelled Livingstone), Ida, Beauregard and other ships at Savannah River, near Fort Pulaski; under flag-of-truce.

=== Siege and reduction of Fort Pulaski ===
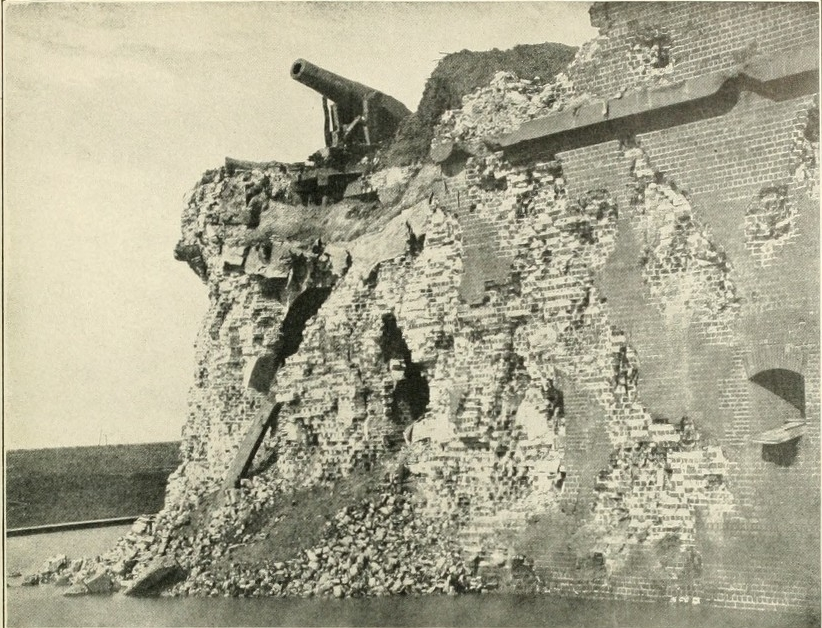
Closeup of damage inflicted on Fort Pulaski by Union artillery on Big Tybee Island, April 12–14, 1862

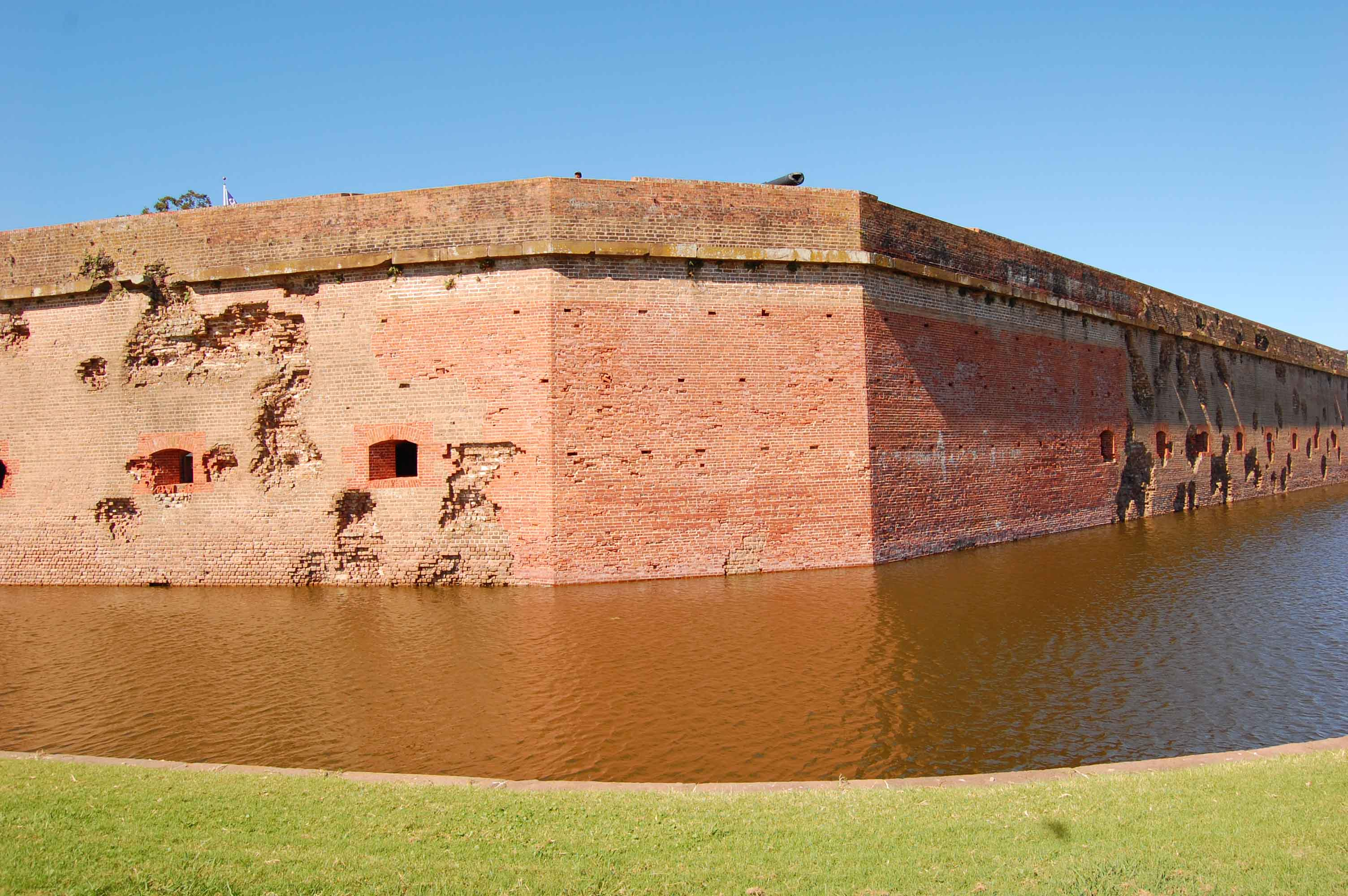
Wall that was breached and repaired with moat around the fort

On the morning of April 10, 1862, Union forces asked for the surrender of the Fort to prevent needless loss of life. Colonel Charles H. Olmstead, commander of the Confederate garrison, rejected the offer.

Fort Pulaski was prepared for a possible infantry attack, but it never endured a direct land assault. Using 36 guns, including the new James Rifled Cannon and Parrott rifles, Union troops began the long bombardment of Fort Pulaski. The rifled projectiles could be accurately fired farther (4–5 miles) than the larger and heavier smoothbore cannonballs. Within 30 hours, the new rifled cannon had breached one of the fort's corner walls. Shells now passed through the fort dangerously close to the main powder magazine. Reluctantly, Colonel Olmstead surrendered the fort. Only two soldiers (one Confederate and one Union) were killed in the attack. Olmstead's decision to surrender haunted him for decades:

We were absolutely isolated beyond any possibility of help from the Confederate authorities, and I did not feel warranted in exposing the garrison to the hazard of the blowing up of our main magazine -- a danger which had just been proved well within the limits of probability.... There are times when a soldier must hold his position to the last extremity, which means extermination, but this was not one of them.... That the fort could and would be absolutely destroyed by the force of the enemy was a demonstrated fact,... while our own power to harm them had been reduced to a minimum,... I am still convinced that there was nothing else that could be done.

Gillmore succeeded almost entirely because of his rifled cannon, which caused massive damage in the walls of the fort. Gillmore's triumph won him promotion from engineer captain to brigadier general.

=== Union control ===
Within six weeks of the surrender, Union forces repaired the fort, and all shipping into and out of Savannah ceased. The loss of Savannah as a viable Confederate port crippled its war effort. With the Fort securely in Union control, General David Hunter, commander of the Union garrison, issued General Order Number 7 on April 16, 1862, which stated that all enslaved at the fort and on Cockspur Island were now free. Fort Pulaski was made a final destination on the Underground Railroad, as slaves throughout the area were freed upon their arrival to Cockspur Island.

The garrison of Union soldiers reached 600 during the initial occupation, but as the war dragged on, it became clear that Southern forces would not be able to retake the fort. The garrison was later reduced to about 250. In October 1864, the fort became a prison for captured Confederate soldiers, mostly officers, known as "The Immortal Six Hundred." The rations given to these men consisted of "moldy bread, soured pickles, and limited water," resulting in multiple cases of "starvation, dehydration, dysentery, and scurvy". As a result of these conditions, thirteen of the men would die at the fort and be buried outside of its walls. After the war ended, Fort Pulaski continued briefly as a military and political prison. It would house a Confederate Secretary of State, Secretary of the Treasury, Secretary of War, Assistant Secretary of War as well as three state governors, a senator, and the men who had commanded the fort after it had been taken by the South.

== Postwar ==
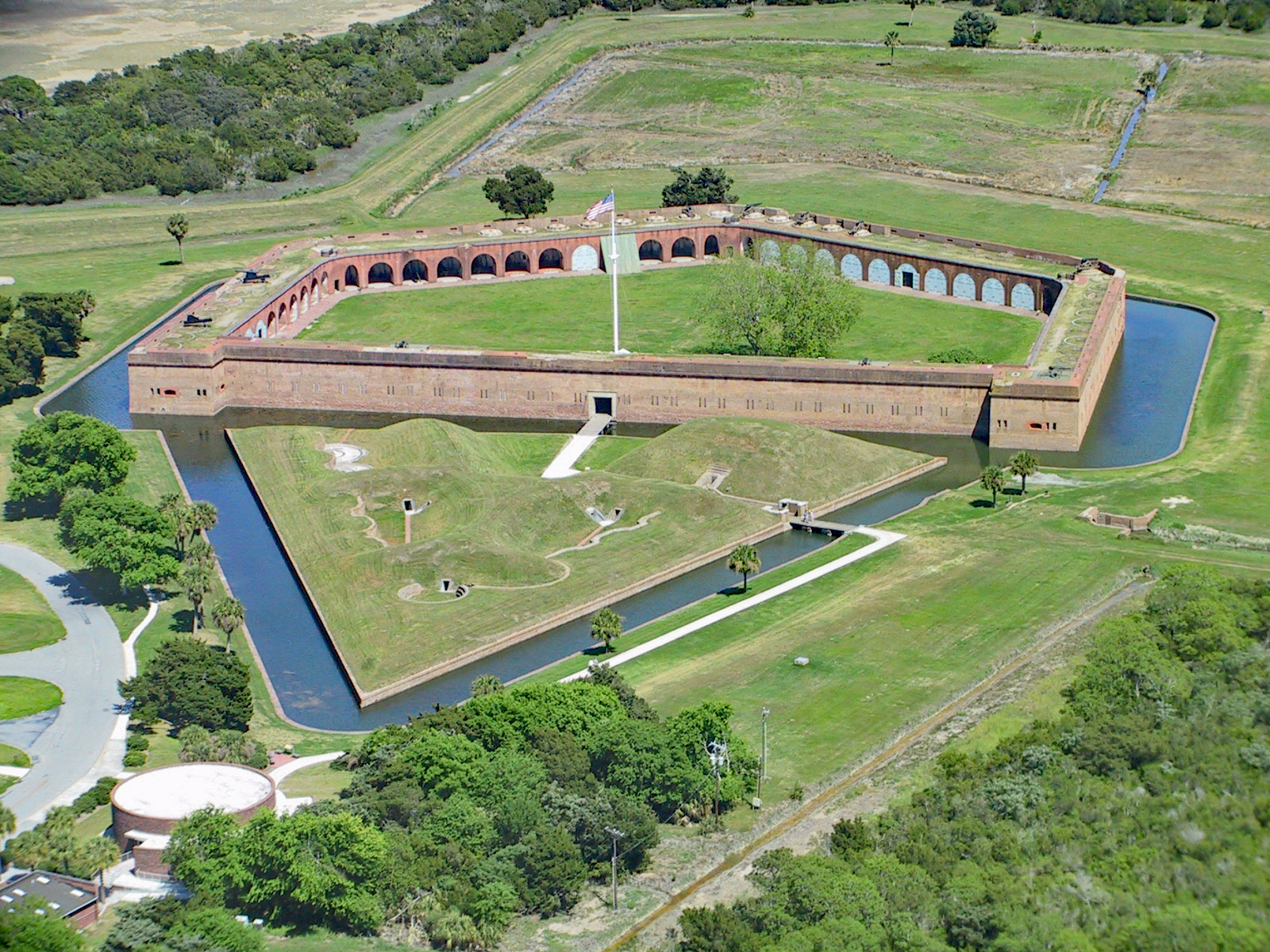
Aerial view of the fort

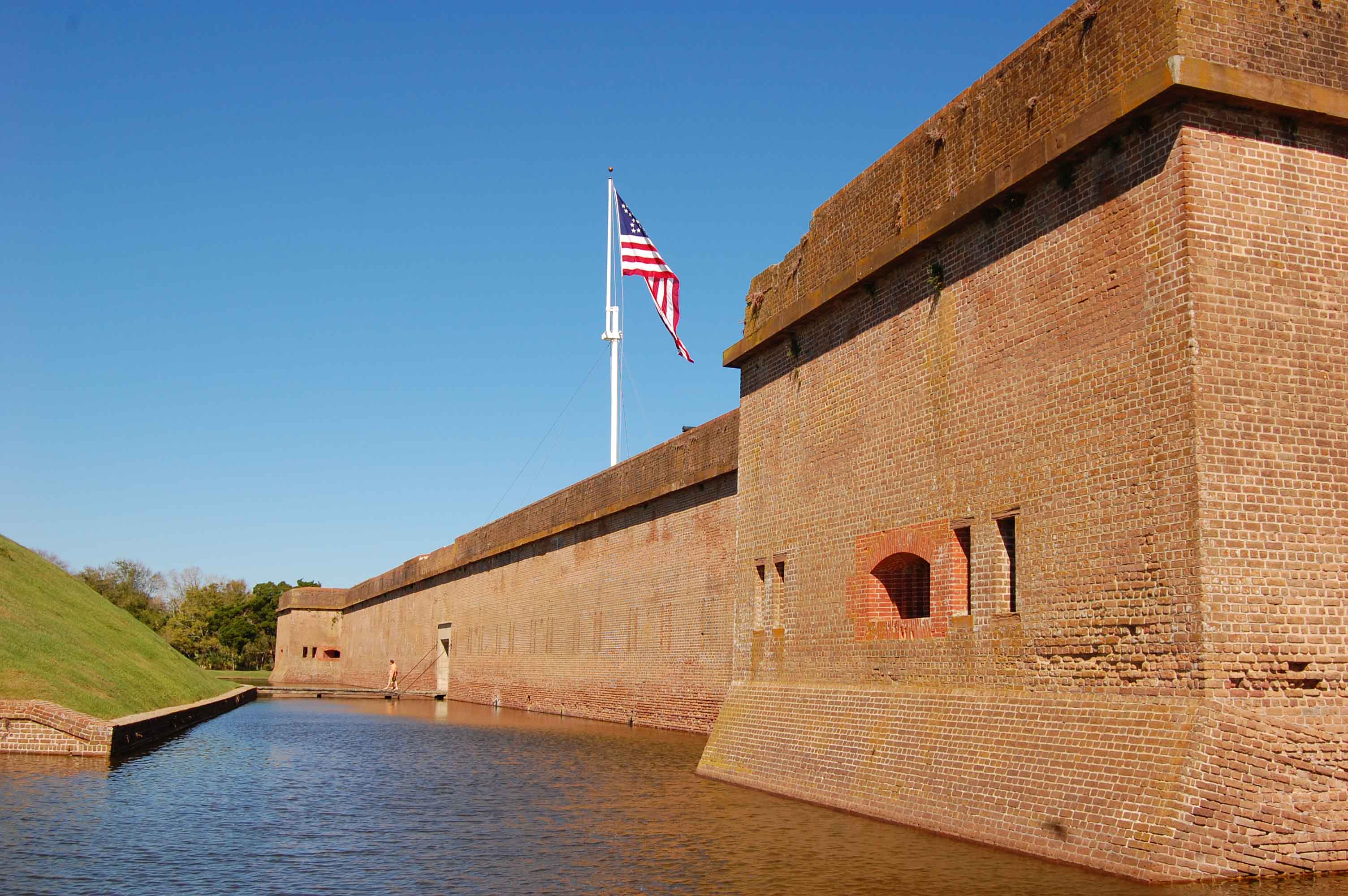
Entrance to Fort Pulaski

Between 1869 and 1872 the demilune to the rear of the Fort was covered with powder magazines, and the few gun positions that were left were enlarged for heavier guns.

By the turn of the 20th century, the fort began to fall into disrepair. In an effort to save the old fort, the War Department finally declared Fort Pulaski a National Monument on October 15, 1924, by presidential proclamation of Calvin Coolidge. The monument was transferred from the War Department to the National Park Service on August 10, 1933. Repairs were then started, and members of the Civilian Conservation Corps arrived on Cockspur Island and began rehabilitation of the fort.

Fort Pulaski was opened to the public only for a short time before the beginning of World War II, which would see further use of Cockspur Island as a section base for the US Navy. After the war, Fort Pulaski reverted to the control of the Park Service and was administratively listed on the National Register of Historic Places on October 15, 1966.

Fort Pulaski remains open to the public, with a museum opened in the 1980s.

In November 2009, Fort Pulaski was used in the filming of Robert Redford's movie The Conspirator, based on the conspiracy involving the assassination of US President Abraham Lincoln, most notably as the site for the gallows used to hang Mary Surratt and others.

It was used once again in filming the 2012 action comedy horror B-movie Abraham Lincoln vs. Zombies for the shooting of scenes in which Lincoln confronts zombies who had overrun a Confederate stronghold.

== Gallery ==
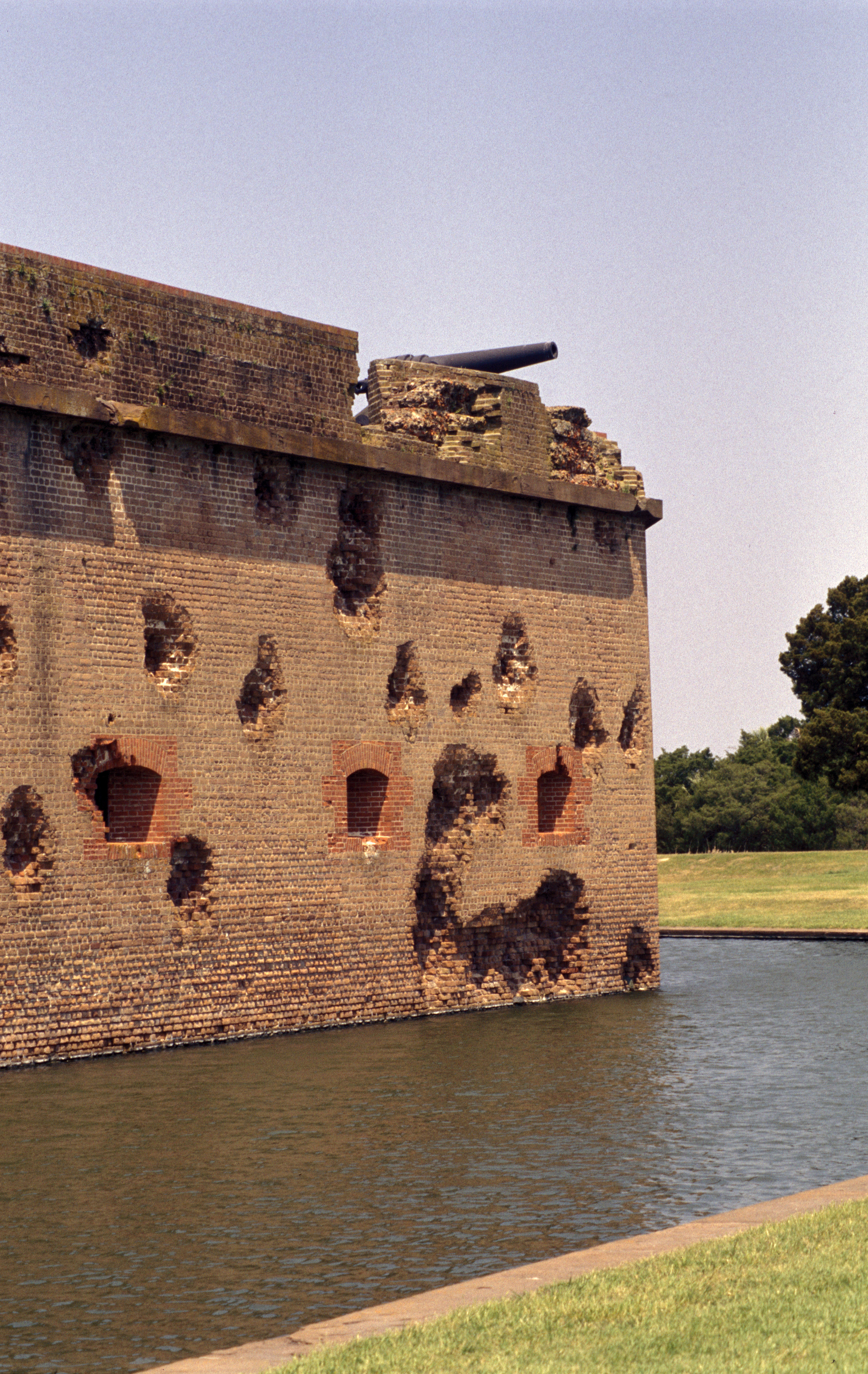
Wall damaged by Union artillery

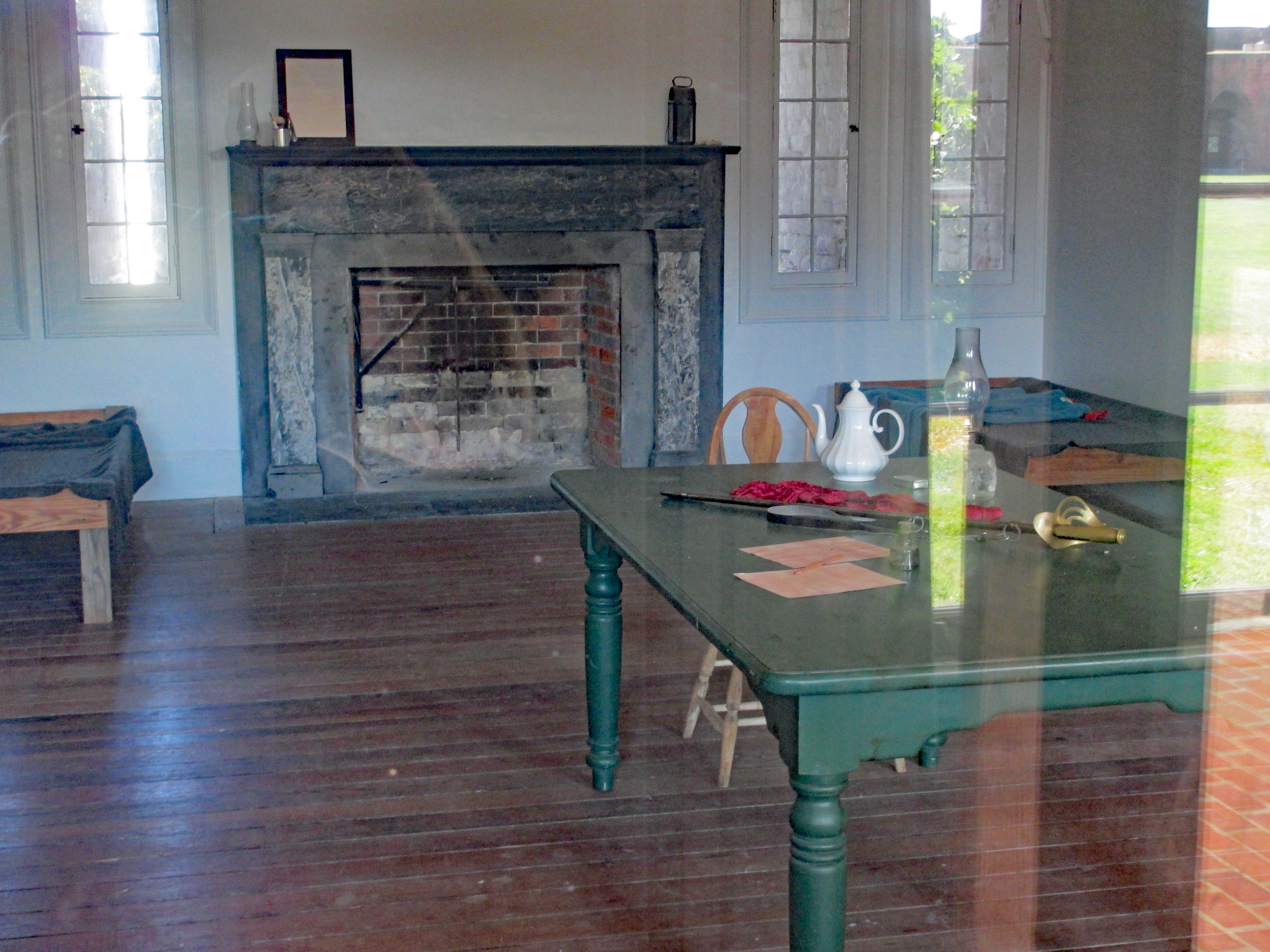
Room where Colonel Olmstead surrendered to the Union Army, April 11, 1862

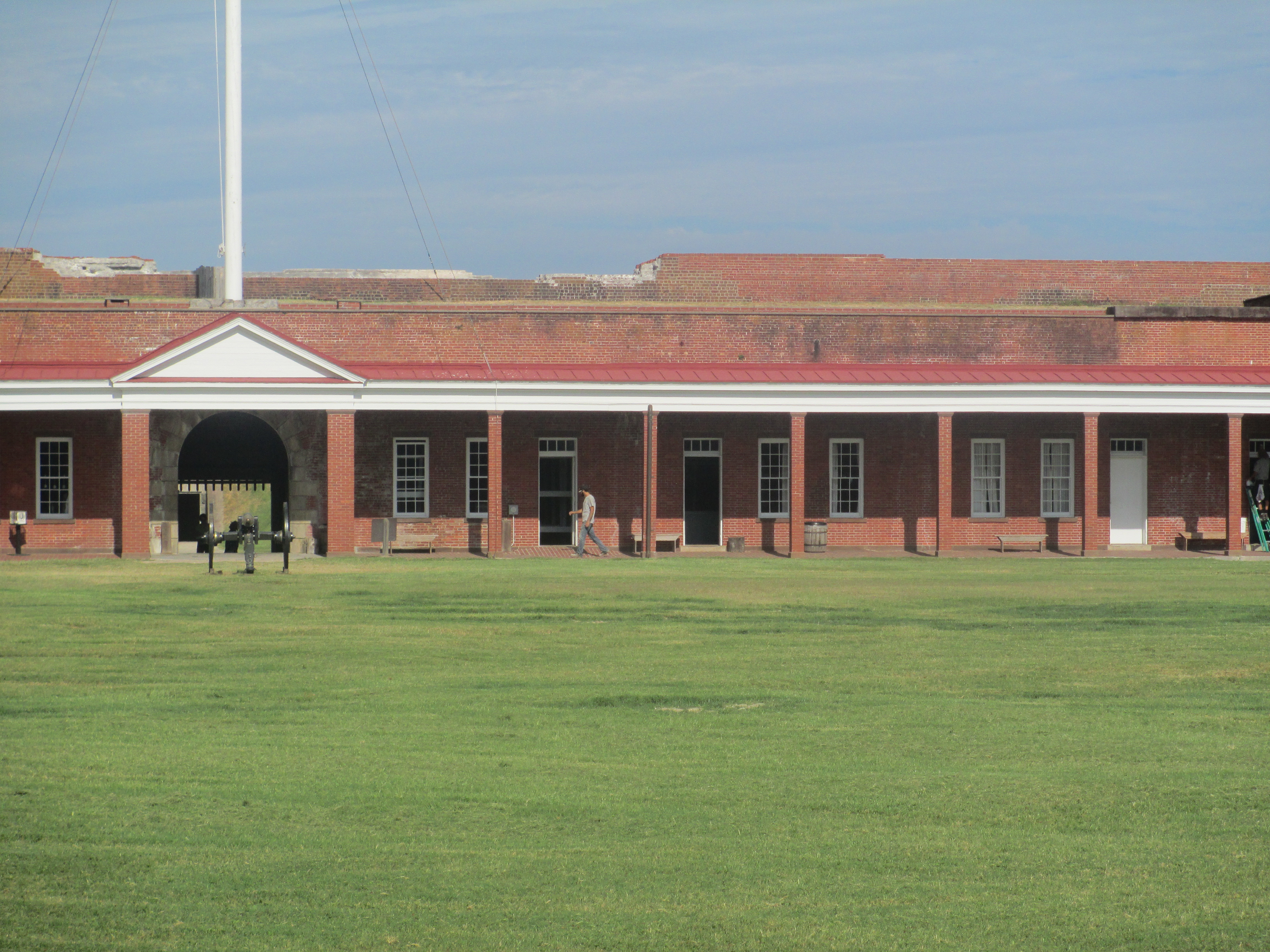
Fort Pulaski in 2012

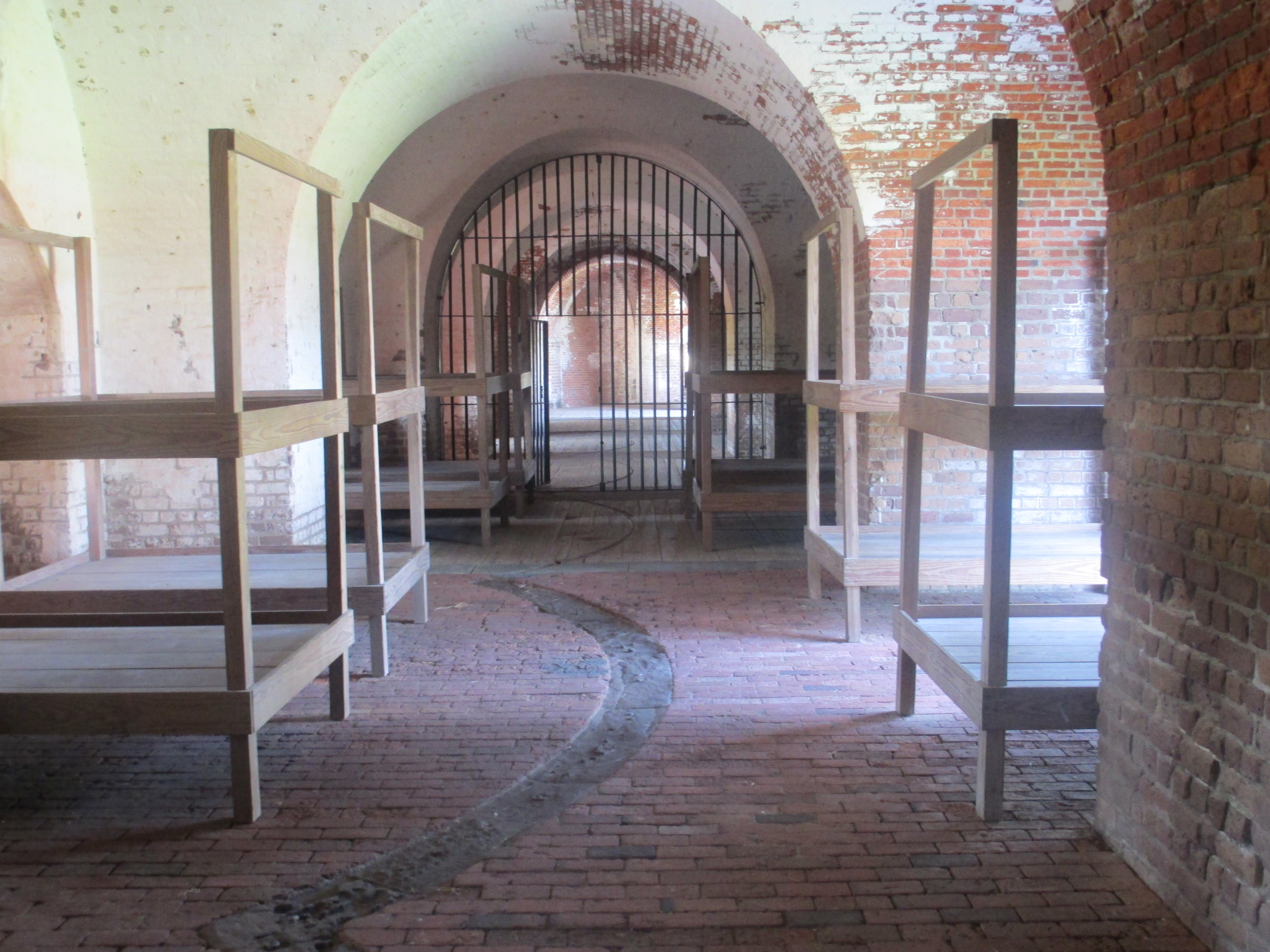
Bunks that were used by prisoners at Fort Pulaski

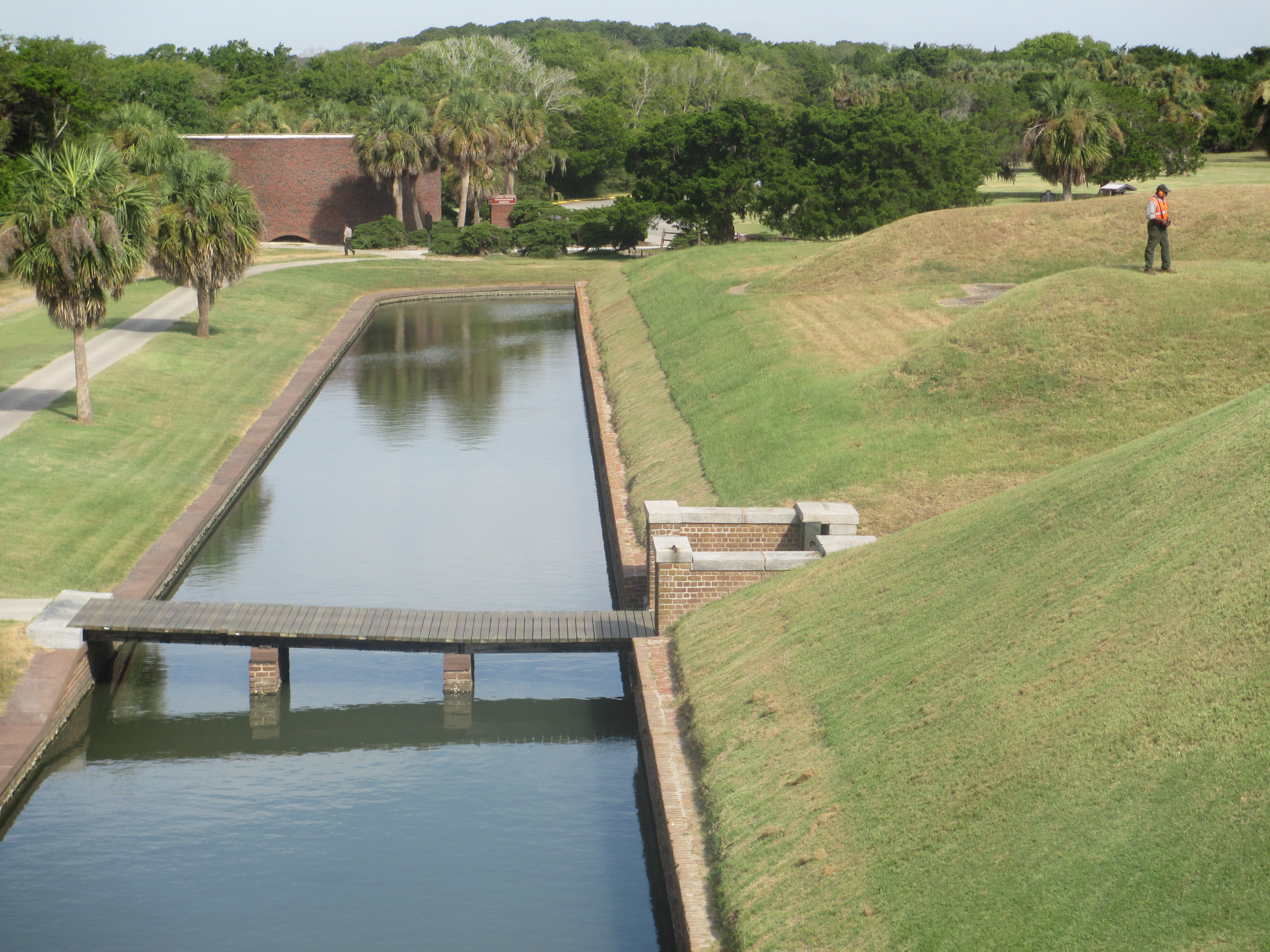
Close-up of the moat around Fort Pulaski

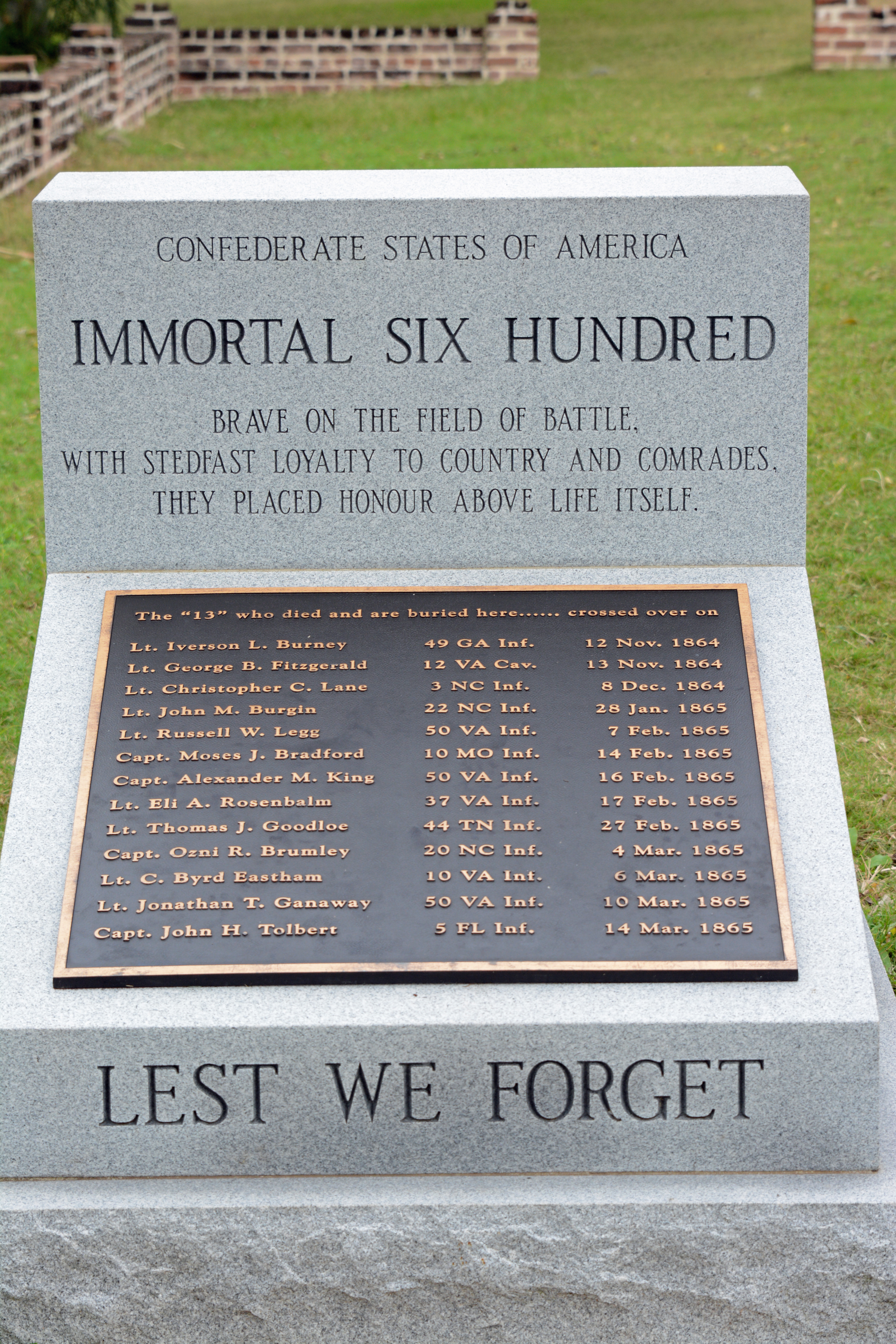
Memorial for the Immortal Six Hundred

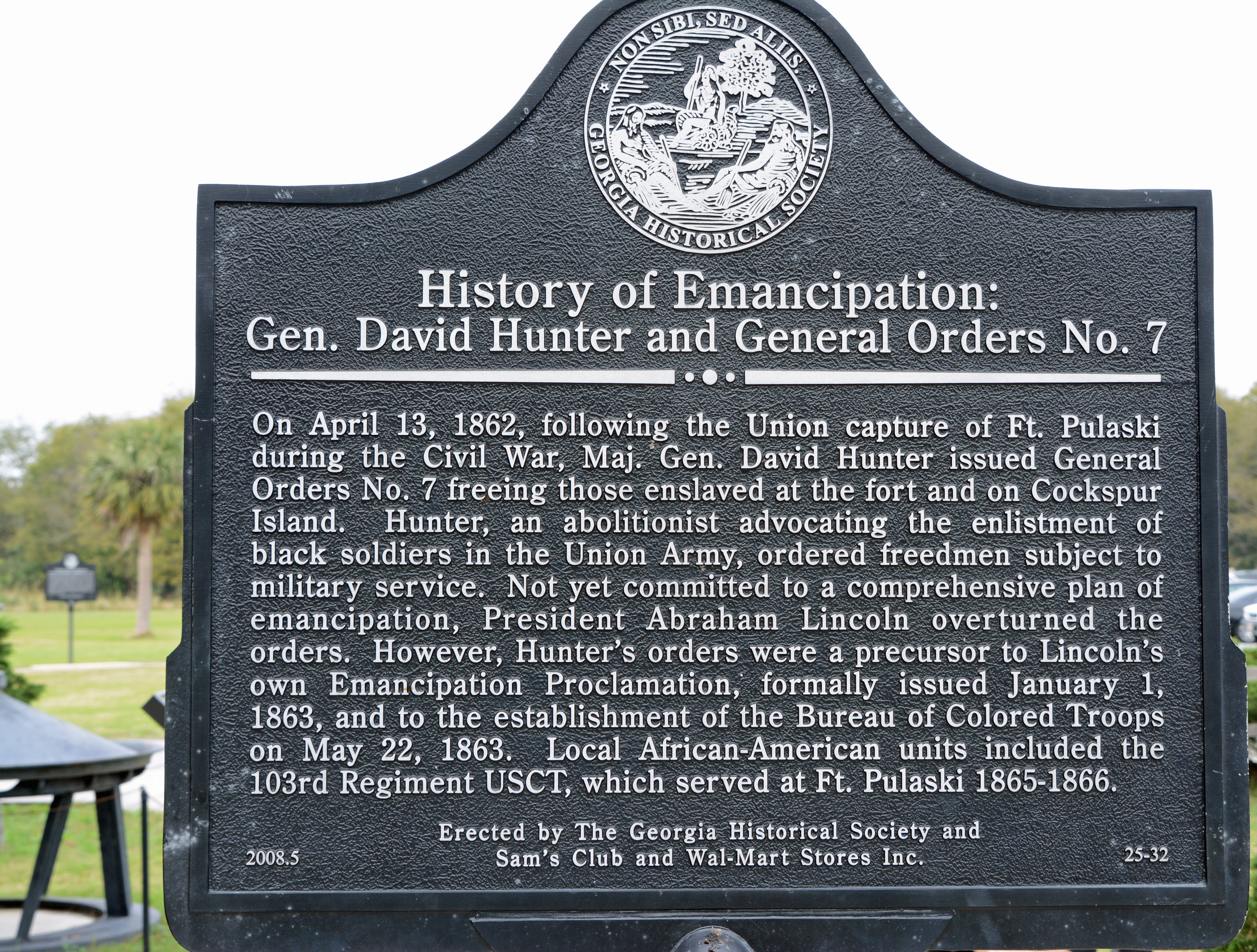
Historical marker about General Orders No. 7

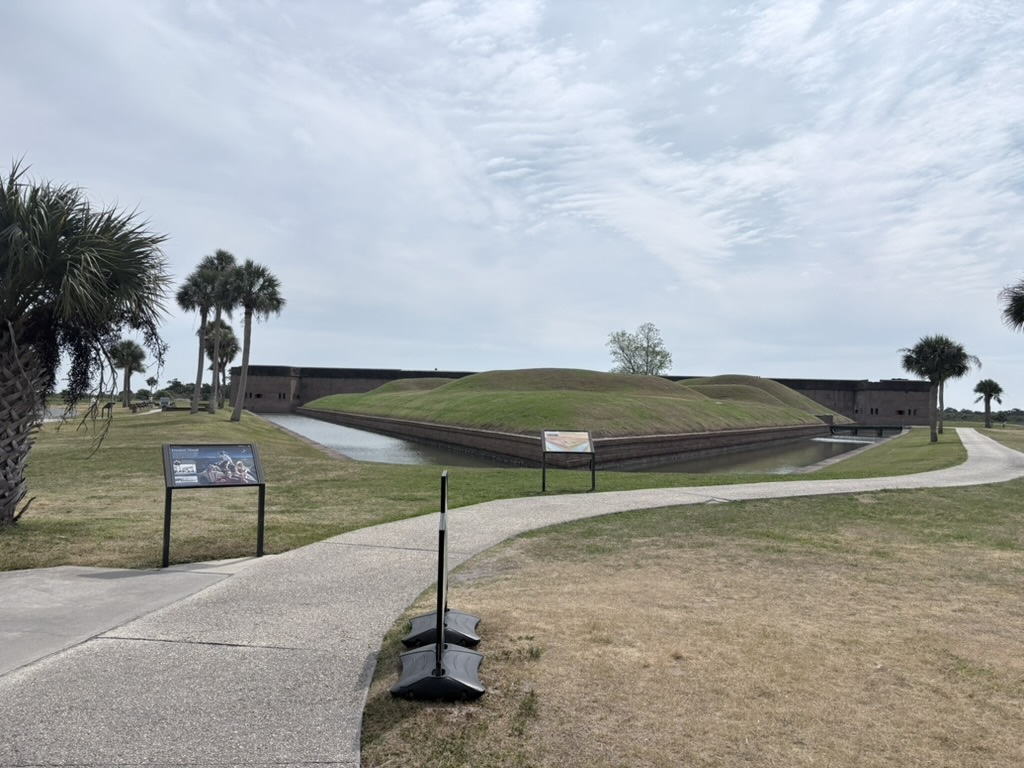
Demilune located in front of the fort entrance

== See also ==
- List of Civil War POW prisons and camps
- Cockspur Island Light, a lighthouse included in this national monument
- Siege of Fort Pulaski
- List of national monuments of the United States
- Marker commemorating a thanksgiving service which John Wesley gave after his first arrival in Georgia is also on the grounds
