= Immortal Six Hundred =

Event in the American Civil War

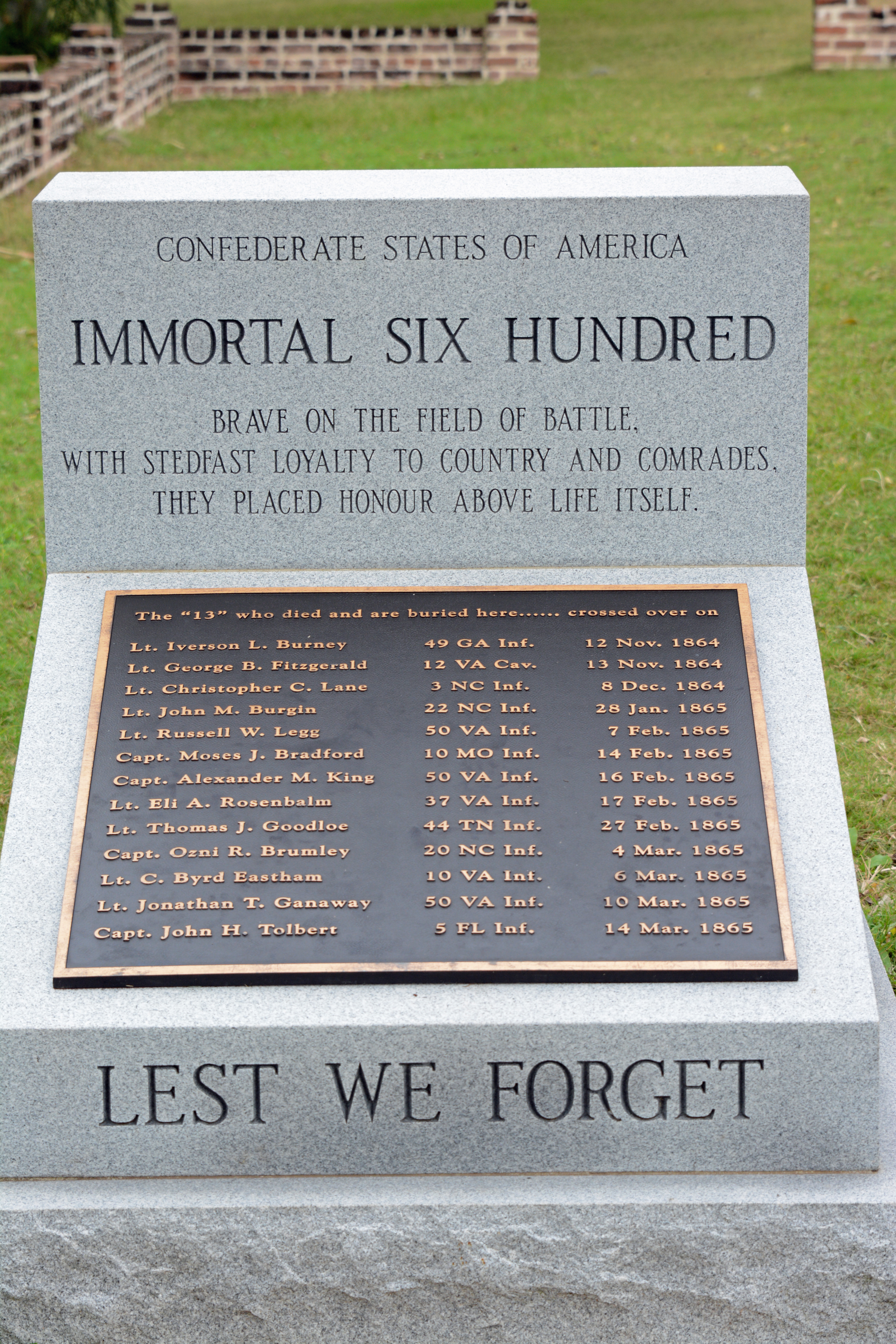
Monument to the Confederate "Immortal Six Hundred" at Fort Pulaski National Monument in Savannah, Georgia

The Immortal Six Hundred were 600 Confederate officers who were held prisoner by the Union Army in 1864–65. In the summer of 1863, the Confederacy passed a resolution stating all captured African-American soldiers and the officers of colored troops would not be returned. The resolution also allowed for any captured officer of colored troops to be executed and any captured African-American soldier be sold into slavery. The resolution caused a breakdown in the exchange of captured soldiers as the Union demanded all soldiers be treated equally. The Immortal Six Hundred were one group of officers who could not be exchanged.

== History ==
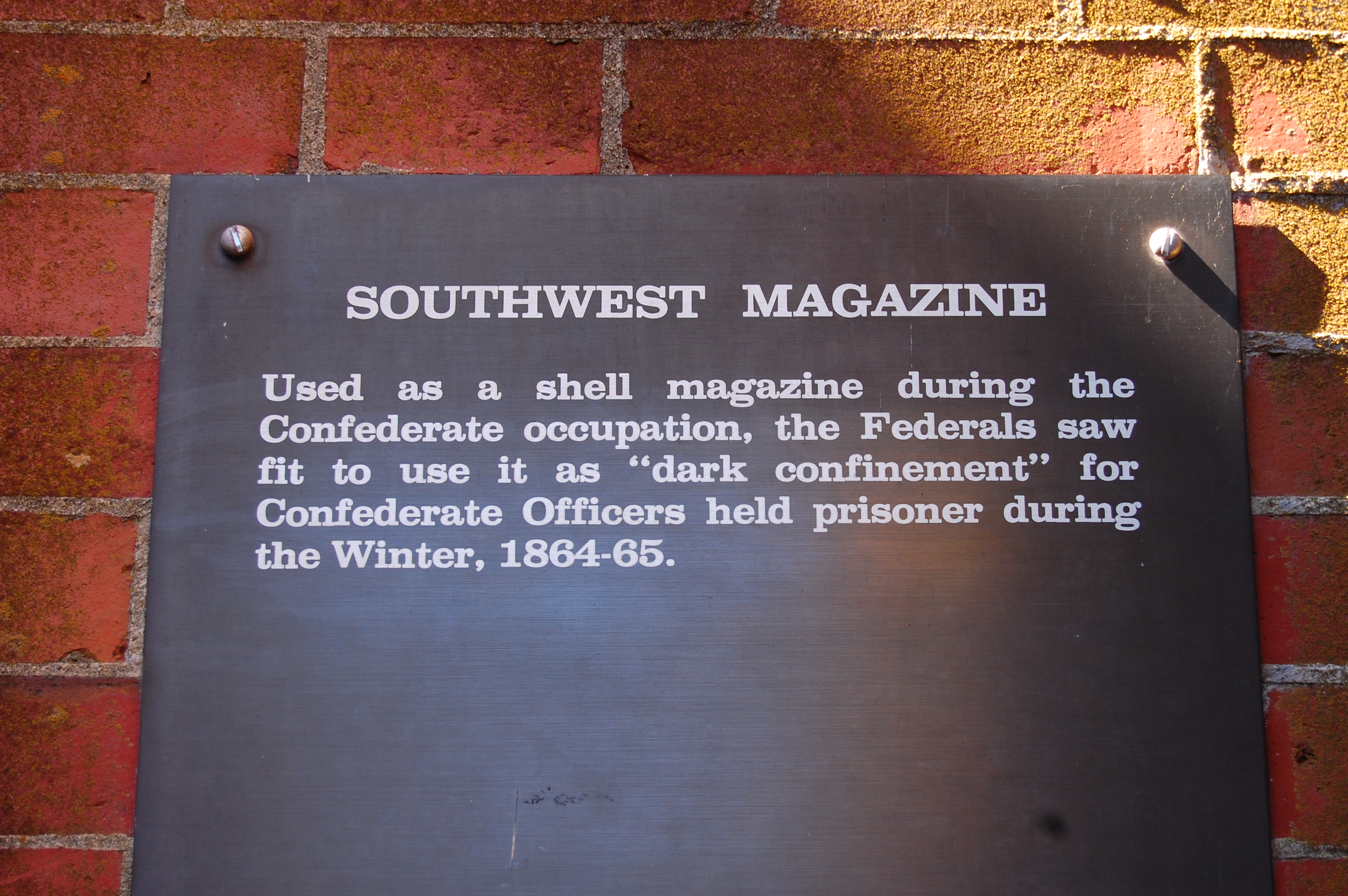
Sign on a room where Confederate soldiers were confined at Fort Pulaski

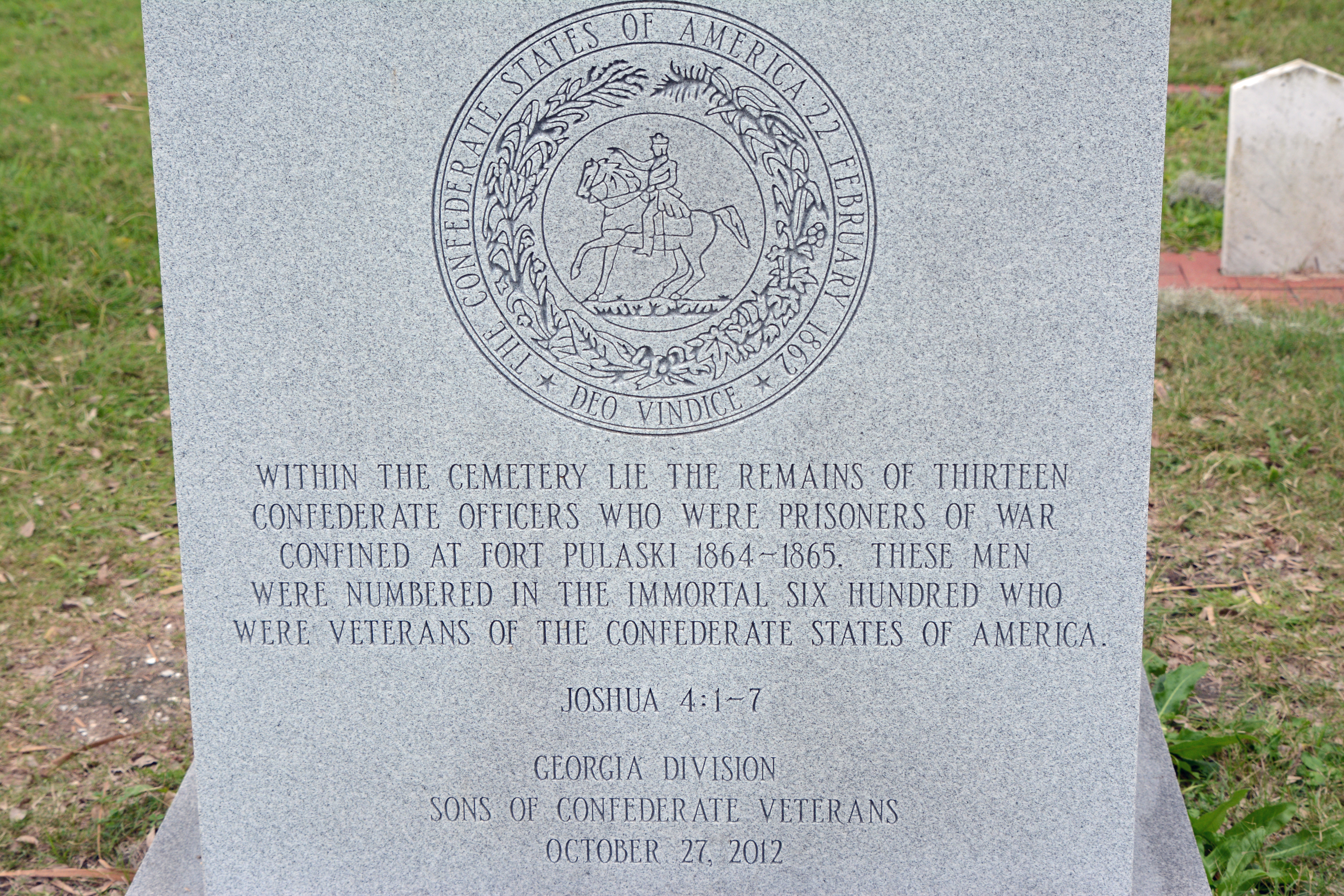
Back of the memorial

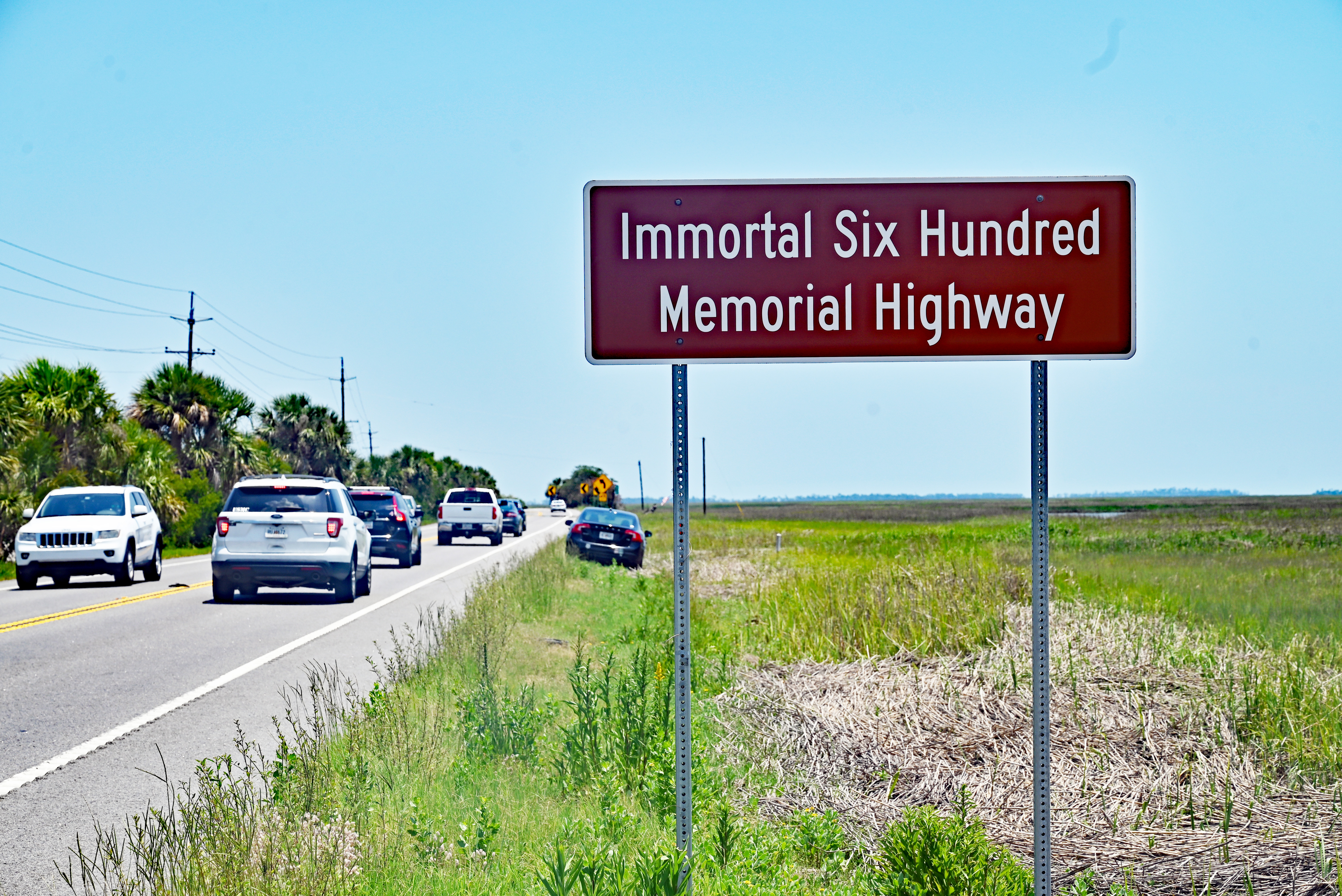
Highway sign on U.S. Route 80

In June 1864, the Confederate Army imprisoned five generals and forty-five Union Army officers in the city of Charleston, South Carolina, using them as human shields in an attempt to stop Union artillery from firing on the city. In retaliation, United States Secretary of War Edwin M. Stanton ordered fifty captured Confederate officers, of similar ranks, to be taken to Morris Island, South Carolina, at the entrance to Charleston Harbor. The Confederates were landed on Morris Island late in July of that year.

The Confederates had originally contended that Charleston should not be shelled. The correspondence between Major General John G. Foster, commanding the Federal Department of the South, and Major General Samuel Jones, commanding the Confederate Department of South Carolina, Georgia, and Florida, indicates the Confederates subsequently accepted the military nature of Charleston as a target. Soon the correspondence turned to an exchange of these high-ranking prisoners.

Instructions from the War Department reached Foster in late July, and he coordinated an exchange of the fifty prisoners on July 29. Exchange of the fifty officers actually took place on August 4, 1864. However, at that time Jones brought 600 additional prisoners to Charleston, in part to press for a larger prisoner exchange. In retaliation for the treatment of Federal prisoners, Foster asked for a like number of Confederate prisoners to be placed on Morris Island. These men became known in the South as the Immortal Six Hundred.

At one point General Foster planned an exchange of the six hundred, but General Ulysses S. Grant refused, following Order 252 which stated no exchanges would occur until the Confederacy agreed to treat both black and white prisoners of war equally. Grant wrote, "In no circumstances will he be allowed to make exchanges of prisoners of war."

The Confederate prisoners did not arrive on Morris Island until the first week of September 1864. During the first week of October 1864, Jones (under orders from Lieutenant General William J. Hardee) removed the Federal prisoners from Charleston. Foster removed the Confederate prisoners from Morris Island only after being informed officially of the Federal prisoners' status. At that time the Immortal 600 were moved to Fort Pulaski.

Three of the six hundred died from subsistence on starvation rations issued as retaliation for the conditions found by the Union at the Confederate prisons in Andersonville in Georgia and at Salisbury Prison in North Carolina.

Upon an outbreak of yellow fever in Charleston, the Union officers were removed from the city limits. In response the Union Army transferred the Immortal Six Hundred to Fort Pulaski outside of Savannah.

There they were crowded into the fort’s casemates. For 42 days, a "retaliation ration" of 10 ounces (280 g) of moldy cornmeal and 1/2 US pint (0.24 L; 0.42 imp pt) of soured onion pickles was the only food issued to the prisoners. The starving men were reduced to supplementing their rations with the occasional rat or stray cat. Thirteen men died there of diseases such as dysentery and scurvy.

At Fort Pulaski, the prisoners organized "The Relief Association of Fort Pulaski for Aid and Relief of the Sick and Less Fortunate Prisoners" on December 13, 1864. Col. Abram Fulkerson of the 63rd Tennessee Infantry Regiment was elected president. Out of their sparse funds, the prisoners collected and expended eleven dollars, according to a report filed by Fulkerson on December 28, 1864.

Five more of the Immortal Six Hundred later died at Hilton Head Island, South Carolina. The remaining prisoners were returned to Fort Delaware on March 12, 1865, where another twenty-five died.

A notable escape effort was led by Captain Henry Dickinson of the 2nd Virginia Cavalry. On the prisoners' journey to Fort Delaware, Dickinson organized a group of thirteen officers, including Colonel Paul F. DeGournay of the 12th Battalion, Louisiana Artillery and Colonel George Woolfolk, to try to escape from the gunboat. However, the effort failed when the captain of the ship, noticing that one of the 13 men was missing, led the prisoners to the brig below the deck of the ship.

The prisoners became known throughout the South for their refusal to take the Oath of Allegiance under duress.
