= List of lighthouses in Louisiana =

This is a list of all lighthouses in the U.S. state of Louisiana.

Name	Image	Location	Coordinates	Year first lit	Automated	Year deactivated	Current Lens	Focal Height
Chandeleur Island Light		Chandeleur Islands		1848 (First); 1896 (Last)	Unknown	2005 (Destroyed)	None	102 ft (31 m)
East Rigolets Light		Lake Borgne (Rigolets)		1833	Never	1874 (Destroyed by 1924)	None	60 ft (18 m)
Frank's Island Light		Mississippi River Delta	N/A	1823	Never	1855^{A} (Replaced)	None	Unknown
New Canal Light		New Orleans		1839 (First); 1890 (Current)	1941	Active^{B} (Inactive: 2005–2012)	Unknown	49 ft (15 m)
Pass A L'Outre Light		Mississippi River Delta		1855	Never	1930 (Abandoned)	None	77 ft (23 m) (Original height)
Pass Manchac Light		Manchac		1839 (First); 1857 (Last)	1941	1987 (Destroyed in 2012)	None	Unknown
Point Au Fer Reef Light		Atchafalaya Basin		1916 (First); 1975 (Current)	Unknown	Active	Unknown	54 ft (16 m)
Port Pontchartrain Light	N/A	New Orleans	N/A	1839 (First); 1855 (Current)	Never	1929	None	Unknown
Sabine Pass Light		Cameron Parish		1857	Never	1952	None	85 ft (26 m)
Ship Shoal Light		Last Island		1860	1929	1965	None	105 ft (32 m)
South Pass Range; Front Light	N/A	Plaquemines Parish	N/A	1886 (First); 1947 (Last)	Unknown	Unknown^{C} (Destroyed)	None	Unknown
South Pass Light (aka: South Pass Rear Range Light)		Plaquemines Parish		1832 (First); 1881 (Current)	1971	Active	DCB-224	105 ft (32 m)
Southwest Pass Light	N/A	Plaquemines Parish	N/A	1832^{D} (First); 2007 (Current)	1984	Active	Unknown	128 ft (39 m) (Third tower)^{D}
Southwest Reef Light		Atchafalaya Basin		1859	Never	1916	None	49 ft (15 m)
Tchefuncte River Range Front Light		Madisonville		1903 (First); 1915 (Last)	Unknown	Unknown (Removed)	None	25 ft (7.6 m)
Tchefuncte River Range Rear Light		Madisonville		1837 (First); 1867 (Current)	1952	Active	250mm	49 ft (15 m)
Trinity Shoal Light		Trinity Shoal	N/A	Never built	Never	N/A	None	N/A
West Rigolets Light		Lake Borgne (Rigolets)		1854	Never	1945 (Destroyed in 2005)	None	29 ft (8.8 m)

== Notes ==
A. The abandoned tower remained until 2002 when it toppled over.
B. In 2005, Hurricane Katrina caused significant damage to the lighthouse. New Canal Light eventually collapsed the following year and was rebuilt/relit by 2012.
C. The jetty that the front light was on has since disappeared. The front light was either removed by human or by nature.
D. The first tower was built in 1832 and collapsed in 1837. The second tower which still stands today was built in 1839 and deactivated after the civil war. The third tower also still stands today and was built in 1871 as a skeletal steel structure. This steel lighthouse lasted until 1965 when a fourth modern tower took its place. In 2007, the 1965 structure was demolished and a new small skeletal metal tower mounted atop a platform stands today.
