= 1879 Atlantic hurricane season =

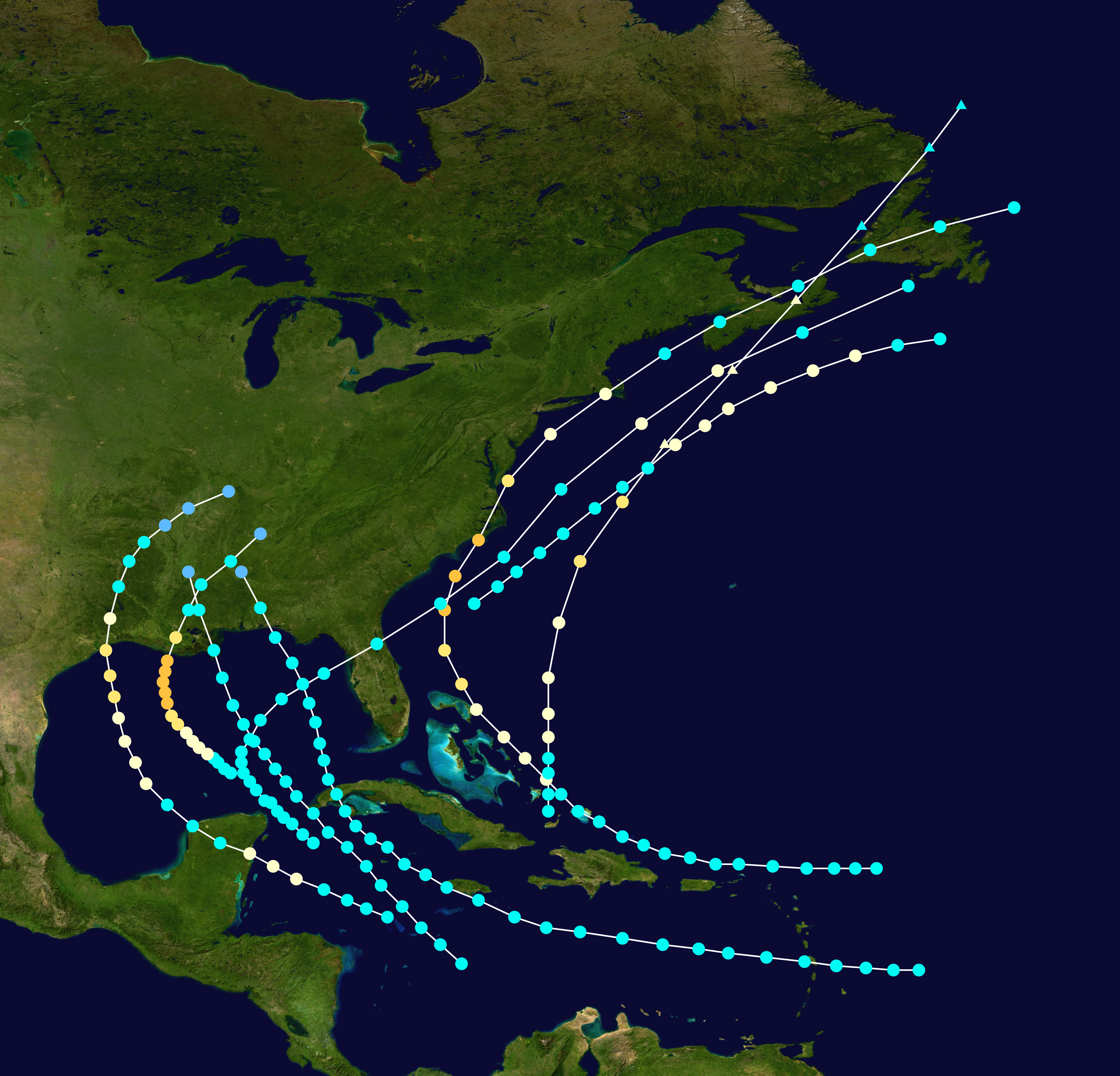
- Season summary map

Seasonal boundaries
- First system formed: August 9, 1879
- Last system dissipated: November 20, 1879

Strongest storm
- Name: Four
  - Maximum winds: 125 mph (205 km/h) (1-minute sustained)
  - Lowest pressure: 945 mbar (hPa; 27.91 inHg)

Seasonal statistics
- Total storms: 8
- Hurricanes: 6
- Major hurricanes (Cat. 3+): 2
- Total fatalities: >74
- Total damage: $500,000 (1879 USD)

The 1879 Atlantic hurricane season was the first season known to have featured two or more major hurricanes making landfall in the United States. (Note: A major hurricane is a storm that ranks as Category 3 or higher on the Saffir–Simpson hurricane wind scale.) In 1879, there were two tropical storms, four hurricanes, and two major hurricanes in the Atlantic basin. However, in the absence of modern satellite and other remote-sensing technologies, only storms that affected populated land areas or encountered ships at sea were recorded, so the actual total could be higher. An undercount bias of zero to six tropical cyclones per year between 1851 and 1885 and zero to four per year between 1886 and 1910 has been estimated.

Of the known 1879 cyclones, the first system was first documented by meteorologists José Fernández-Partagás and Henry F. Diaz in 1995. They also proposed large changes to the known tracks of the second, third, seventh, and eighth cyclones. Later, the Atlantic hurricane reanalysis project in the early 21st century determined that one storm was not a tropical cyclone at all and removed it from the official hurricane database (HURDAT), but they did not add any new systems and only made a major adjustment to the track of the second storm. However, climate researcher Michael Chenoweth authored a reanalysis study, published in 2014, which concluded that the 1879 season featured a total of thirteen tropical cyclones. This included the removal of the seventh and eighth systems and the addition of seven previously undocumented storms. Chenoweth also proposed some alterations to the track and intensity of each storm, but these changes have yet to be incorporated into HURDAT.

The season's first known system existed by August 9, based on weather observations over the Southeastern United States. Although this storm did not make landfall, two people presumably drowned after being swept overboard the Prince Louis. Thereafter, three consecutive known tropical cyclones eventually struck the United States at hurricane intensity. The first of the three caused 54 or more deaths, including 46 in the United States and at least 8 in the Lesser Antilles. Two people drowned offshore Louisiana due to the third cyclone as it struck Texas, while the fourth storm of the season, which made landfall in Louisiana, caused one fatality and about $500,000 (1879 USD) in damage. (Note: All values in 1879 USD unless otherwise noted.) About a month passed before the fifth system was first detected on October 3 over the southwestern Caribbean Sea. Although this cyclone left only minor impacts, the following storm resulted in floods on Jamaica that killed 13 people. The seventh and eighth cyclones caused an unknown number of deaths after capsizing ships and both later impacted Atlantic Canada, with two fatalities due to the former in Nova Scotia. On November 18, the eighth system became extratropical to the southeast of New England, ending seasonal activity.

== Season summary ==
The Atlantic hurricane database (HURDAT) recognizes eight tropical cyclones for the 1879 season. Six storms attained hurricane status, with maximum sustained winds of 74 mph (119 km/h) or greater, while two of those became major hurricanes, with sustained winds exceeding 110 mph (180 km/h). Both major hurricanes struck Louisiana. Consequently, 1879 became the first season with at least two cyclones striking the United States at that intensity. The season's fourth cyclone became the most intense, peaking as a Category 3 hurricane on the present-day Saffir–Simpson scale with winds of 125 mph (205 km/h) and a minimum atmospheric pressure of 945 mbar (27.9 inHg). In their 1995 reanalysis, meteorologists José Fernández-Partagás and Henry F. Diaz first documented the season's first storm and significantly revised the tracks of the second, third, seventh, and eighth cyclones. Later, the Atlantic hurricane reanalysis project in the early 21st century determined that one storm instead resembled a norther and located no evidence of the storm's existence other than a track map constructed by professor Edward B. Garriott in 1900, leading to its removal from HURDAT. The Atlantic hurricane reanalysis project did not add any new systems and only made a major adjustment to the track of the season's second storm. However, climate researcher Michael Chenoweth authored a reanalysis study, published in 2014, which concluded that the 1879 season featured a total of 13 tropical cyclones. This included the removal of the seventh and eighth systems and the addition of seven previously undocumented storms, for a net gain of five cyclones. Chenoweth also proposed some alterations to the track and intensity of each existing storm. However, these changes have yet to be incorporated into HURDAT.

Known seasonal activity began on August 9, when HURDAT initiated the track of the first system offshore South Carolina. Although it did not make landfall, the storm presumably drowned two sailors after sweeping off the ship Prince Louis. August featured four cyclones overall, all of which intensified into a hurricane. The second of the four produced flooding in the Lesser Antilles and high winds and storm surge along the East Coast of the United States, particularly in North Carolina and Virginia after making landfall in North Carolina as a Category 3 hurricane. This storm caused at least 54 fatalities. The third and fourth cyclone both severely impacted Louisiana, causing two and one fatalities respectively, while the former also left destruction in Texas and the latter inflicted about $500,000 in damage in Louisiana. After the fourth cyclone dissipated over Alabama on September 2, no further activity is known to have occurred until October 3, when a storm was first observed over the southwestern Caribbean Sea. Clipping western Cuba and striking the United States at tropical storm intensity, the cyclone caused little impact on land. The following storm, the season's sixth, dropped heavy rainfall on Jamaica, causing a flood that killed 13 people. In late October, the seventh cyclone of the season drowned all but two occupants of the schooner Sallie in the Gulf of Mexico before striking Florida at tropical storm intensity. The storm later affected Atlantic Canada, causing two deaths in Nova Scotia. The eighth and final system is known to have existed from November 18 to November 20, when it transitioned into an extratropical cyclone southeast of New England.

The season's activity was reflected with an accumulated cyclone energy (ACE) rating of 64, the third-lowest total of the decade, behind only 1876 and 1874. ACE is a metric used to express the energy used by a tropical cyclone during its lifetime. Therefore, a storm with a longer duration will have higher values of ACE. It is only calculated at six-hour increments in which specific tropical and subtropical systems are either at or above sustained wind speeds of 39 mph (63 km/h), which is the threshold for tropical storm intensity. Thus, tropical depressions are not included here.

== Systems ==
=== Hurricane One ===
- Category 1 hurricane (SSHWS)
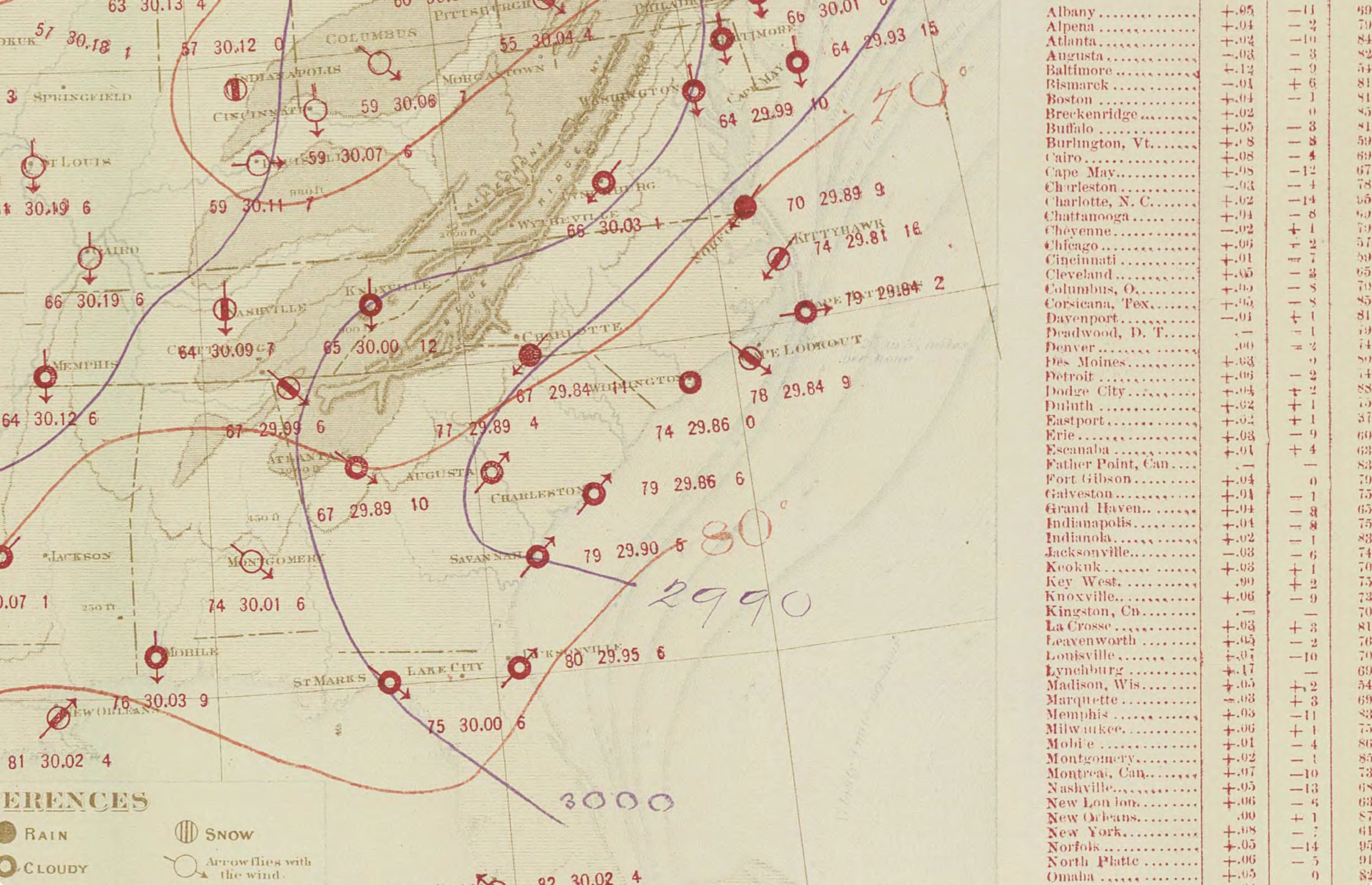
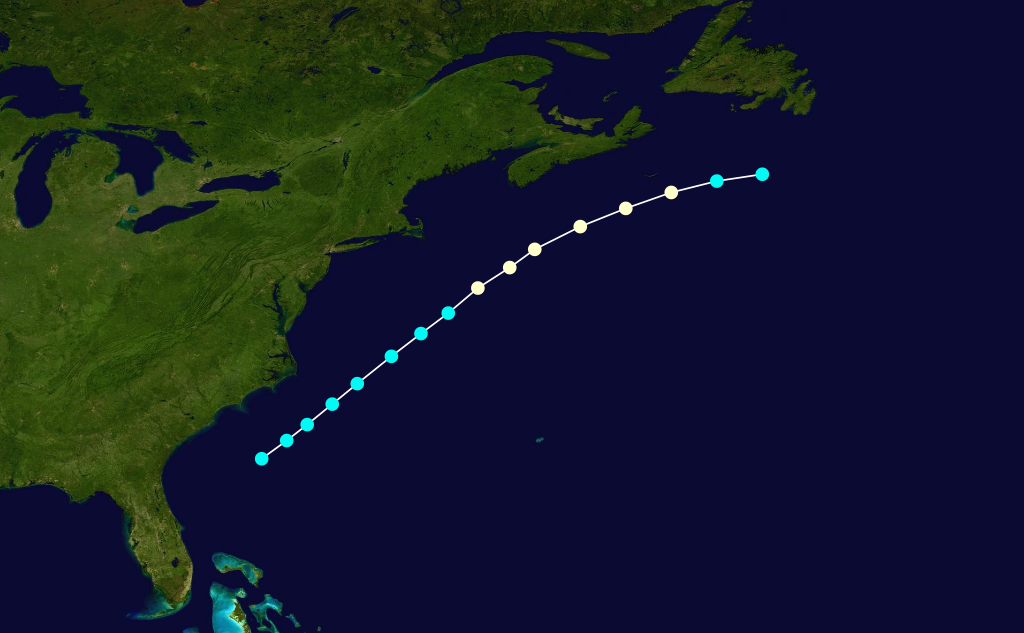
- Duration: August 9 – August 12
- Peak intensity: 80 mph (130 km/h) (1-min);

With The New York Times reporting rainy conditions in the Southeastern United States and the Monthly Weather Review noting that a low-pressure area probably existed by August 9, the Atlantic hurricane database (HURDAT) begins the track of this cyclone about 190 mi (305 km) southeast of Charleston, South Carolina. Moving northeastward, the storm is estimated to have intensified into a hurricane by August 11 and peaked with maximum sustained winds of 80 mph (130 km/h), based on accounts from nearby ships. It weakened to a tropical storm while paralleling the coast of Nova Scotia on August 12 and was last noted several hours later while situated about 190 mi (310 km) south-southwest of St. Shott's, Newfoundland. Climate scientist Michael Chenoweth proposed that this system developed as a tropical depression and moved slower than shown in HURDAT. Rough seas generated by the hurricane swept two sailors off the ship Prince Louis, both of whom were presumed to have drowned.

=== Hurricane Two ===
- Category 3 hurricane (SSHWS)
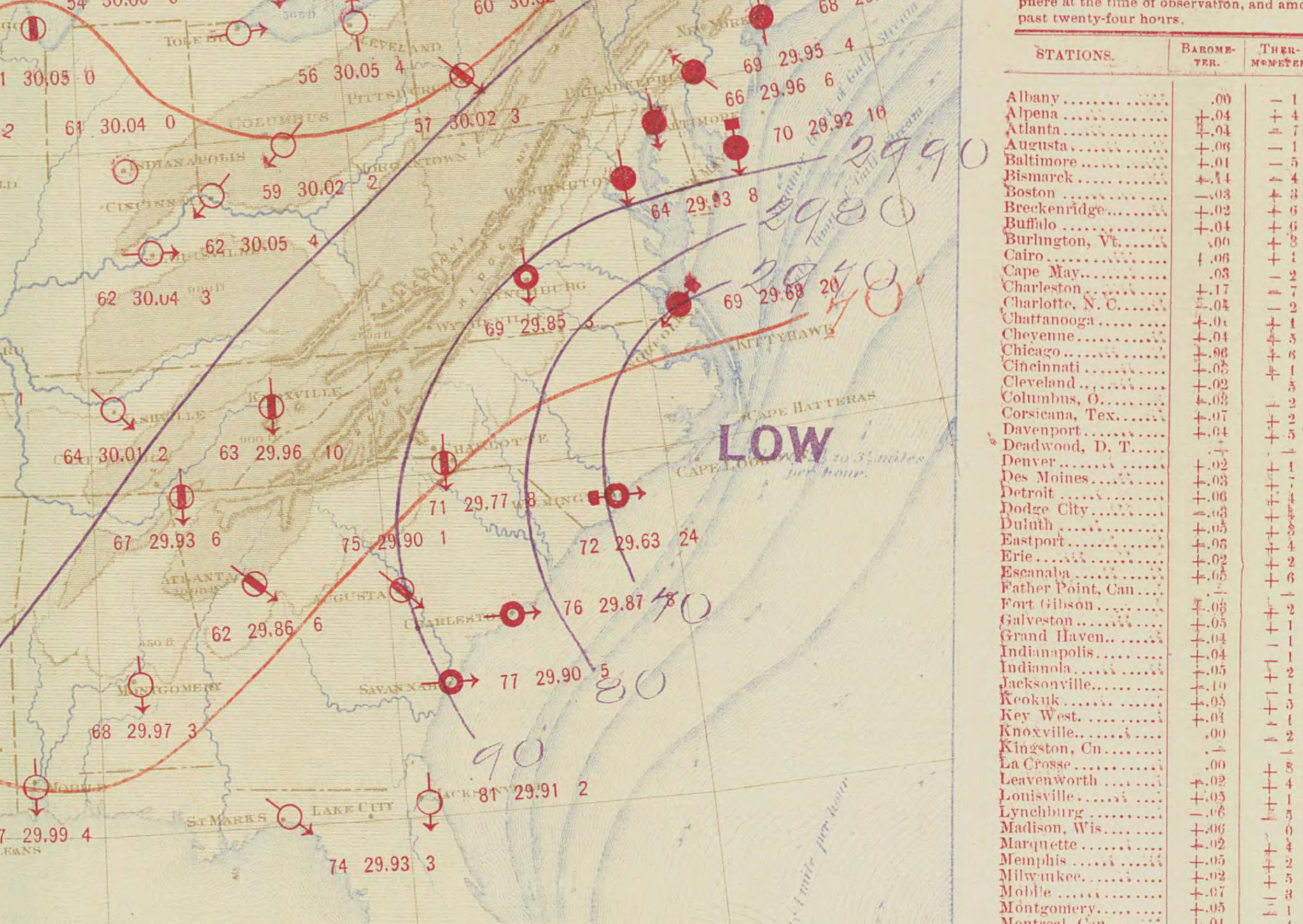
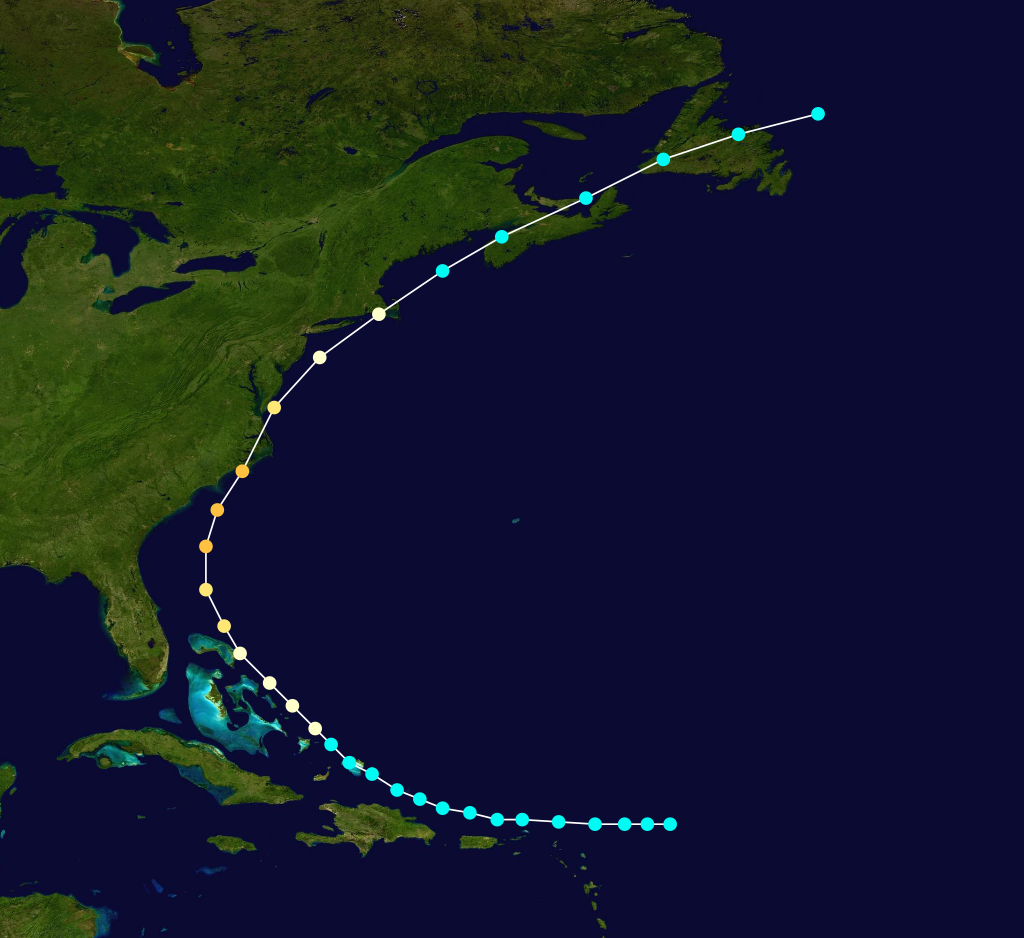
- Duration: August 13 – August 20
- Peak intensity: 115 mph (185 km/h) (1-min); 971 mbar (hPa)

The Great Beaufort Hurricane of 1879
An unnamed vessel reported stormy conditions and rapidly falling barometric pressures northeast of the Lesser Antilles on August 13. With the track initiated about 260 mi (420 km) east-northeast of Barbuda, the cyclone headed westward, passing north of the Lesser Antilles. By August 15, the storm began turning northwestward, paralleling the Dominican Republic but then striking Turks and Caicos Islands early the next day. After crossing the far southeastern Bahamas, the cyclone intensified into a hurricane on August 16. Turning northeastward on August 18, the system intensified into a Category 3 hurricane with winds of 115 mph (185 km/h), and made landfall near Morehead City, North Carolina, at 12:00 UTC. A 1989 reanalysis estimated that the hurricane possessed a barometric pressure of 971 mbar (28.7 inHg), based on intense winds near the point of landfall. After crossing the state, the storm moved into the northwestern Atlantic and moved ashore near Falmouth, Massachusetts, as a Category 1 hurricane with winds of 80 mph (130 km/h) early on August 19. The hurricane then weakened to a tropical storm and crossed Atlantic Canada between that day and the following, striking Nova Scotia and Newfoundland before being last noted just east of the latter on August 20.

Chenoweth's reanalysis study argued that this storm actually formed east of the Windward Islands on August 12, crossing Martinique, the eastern Caribbean, and Puerto Rico before following a path similar to that shown in HURDAT. Heavy rains fell over the Lesser Antilles, with flooding and landslides killing at least one person on Barbados and seven on Martinique. The latter also reported damage to bridges and homes, with some being completely carried away. Strong winds impacted many places in coastal North Carolina. Cape Lookout recorded wind gusts of 138 mph (222 km/h) before the anemometer cups blew away; wind gusts there are estimated to have reached 168 mph (270 km/h). The Beaufort–Morehead City area likely experienced the worst impacts, where the hurricane destroyed all wharves, about 1,000 ft (300 m) of railroad, and two hotels and toppled the chimneys of most homes. Many vessels wrecked near Beaufort and at least one more near Cape Hatteras. The cyclone also destroyed anemometers at Hatteras, Fort Macon, Kitty Hawk, and Portsmouth in North Carolina and Cape Henry in Virginia, with wind speeds estimated at 100 mph (160 km/h) or more. A storm surge up to 8 ft (2.4 m) high was seen at Norfolk, Virginia. Heavy rains in the city caused floodwaters to inundate wharves, streets, and the lower floors of buildings, while high winds deroofed homes and uprooted many trees. Tides reached then-highest known heights in Portsmouth, flooding streets and wrecking several vessels. Strong winds impacted many areas farther north, with Atlantic City and Barnegat in New Jersey recording sustained winds of 63 mph (101 km/h). The hurricane was responsible for 46 deaths in the United States, and sank more than 100 large vessels across the country's east coast. Later, the cyclone wrecked or beached at least three vessels in Nova Scotia.

=== Hurricane Three ===
- Category 2 hurricane (SSHWS)
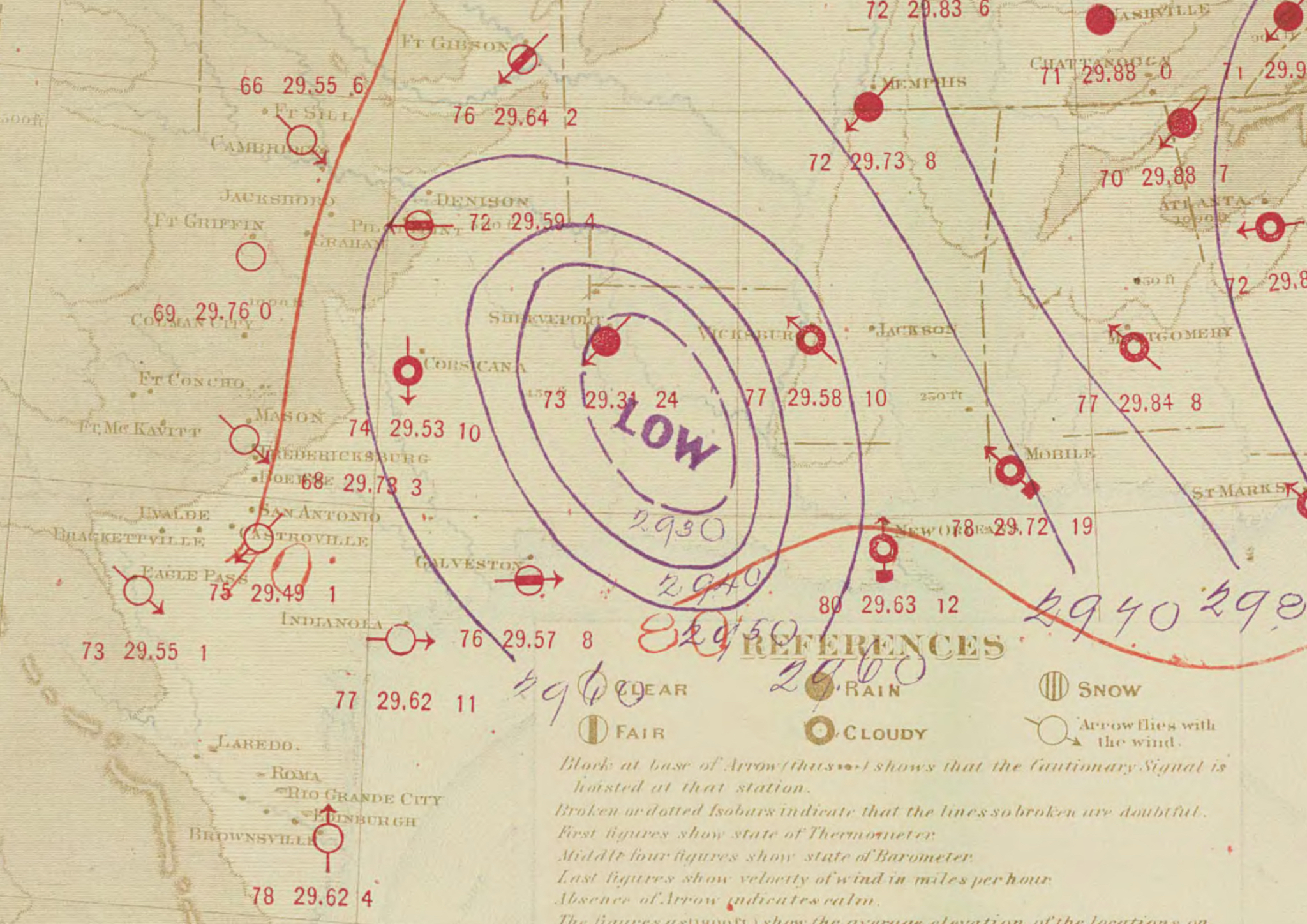
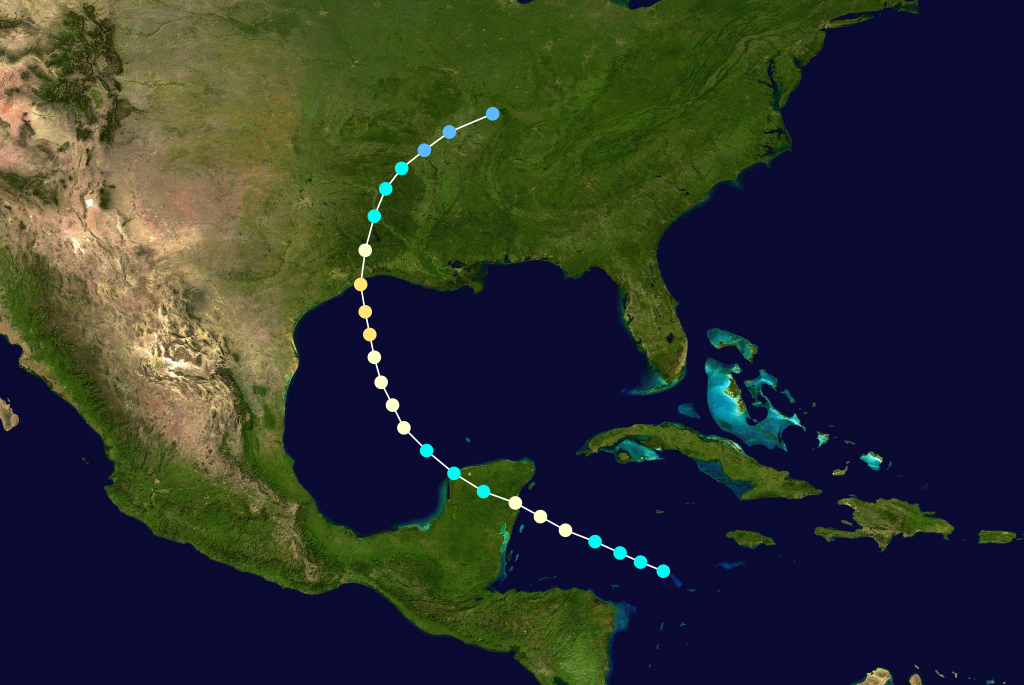
- Duration: August 19 – August 24
- Peak intensity: 105 mph (165 km/h) (1-min); 964 mbar (hPa)

Benito Viñes documented this storm over the northwestern Caribbean as early as August 19. Moving west-northwestward, the cyclone intensified into a hurricane on at 00:00 UTC on August 20, according to reports from the ship Elvina. About 12 hours later, the hurricane made landfall in Mexico near Felipe Carrillo Puerto, Quintana Roo, with winds of 80 mph (130 km/h). The hurricane weakened to a tropical storm late on August 20, but re-strengthened into a hurricane in the Gulf of Mexico the next day. Turning north-northwestward, the cyclone strengthened into a Category 2 hurricane on August 22, and made landfall near present-day High Island, Texas, early on August 23. Based on a barometric pressure of 988 mbar (29.2 inHg) at Shreveport, Louisiana, the hurricane is estimated to have possessed sustained winds of 105 mph (165 km/h) and a barometric pressure of 964 mbar (28.5 inHg). The system weakened to a tropical storm later on August 23 and then to a tropical depression early on August 24, before dissipating over Kentucky several hours later.

The reanalysis study by Chenoweth indicated that this storm may have formed just south of the Yucatán Channel and brushed the northeastern corner of the Yucatán Peninsula as a tropical storm, rather than as a hurricane farther south. Additionally, the cyclone lasted longer over the United States, becoming extratropical over West Virginia late on August 25. Strong winds over far eastern Texas damaged all sawmills, tossed railroad cars off their tracks, and uprooted many trees in Orange. Several vessels capsized, suffered damage, or beached across that part of the state. In Louisiana, a wave at Calcasieu Pass grounded at least 12 vessels high-and-dry. Two people drowned after being swept overboard the brig Caseatell. The Sabine Pass Lighthouse reportedly swayed about 6 in (150 mm) and lost its beacon. A two-story church in Johnson Bayou and numerous homes were destroyed throughout Cameron Parish, with some completely swept away. Additionally, hundreds of cattle drowned. Farther east, few structures between Morgan City and New Iberia escaped damage, while the hurricane destroyed some homes and deroofed many others in the former and in Franklin. The Lake Charles area demolished many chimneys, fences, and older buildings; ripped off a church spire; uprooted trees; and damaged much vegetation. Throughout Louisiana, the cyclone caused extensive damage to fruit and sugar cane crops. Abnormally high tides in Mississippi swept away some bathhouses and strong winds destroyed several cabins at a coastal campground. Heavy precipitation in Arkansas overflowed streams and damaged or carried away many bridges. Elsewhere, Mobile, Alabama, recorded 2.27 in (58 mm) of precipitation in an eight-hour period and heavy rains fell over Tennessee.

=== Hurricane Four ===
- Category 3 hurricane (SSHWS)
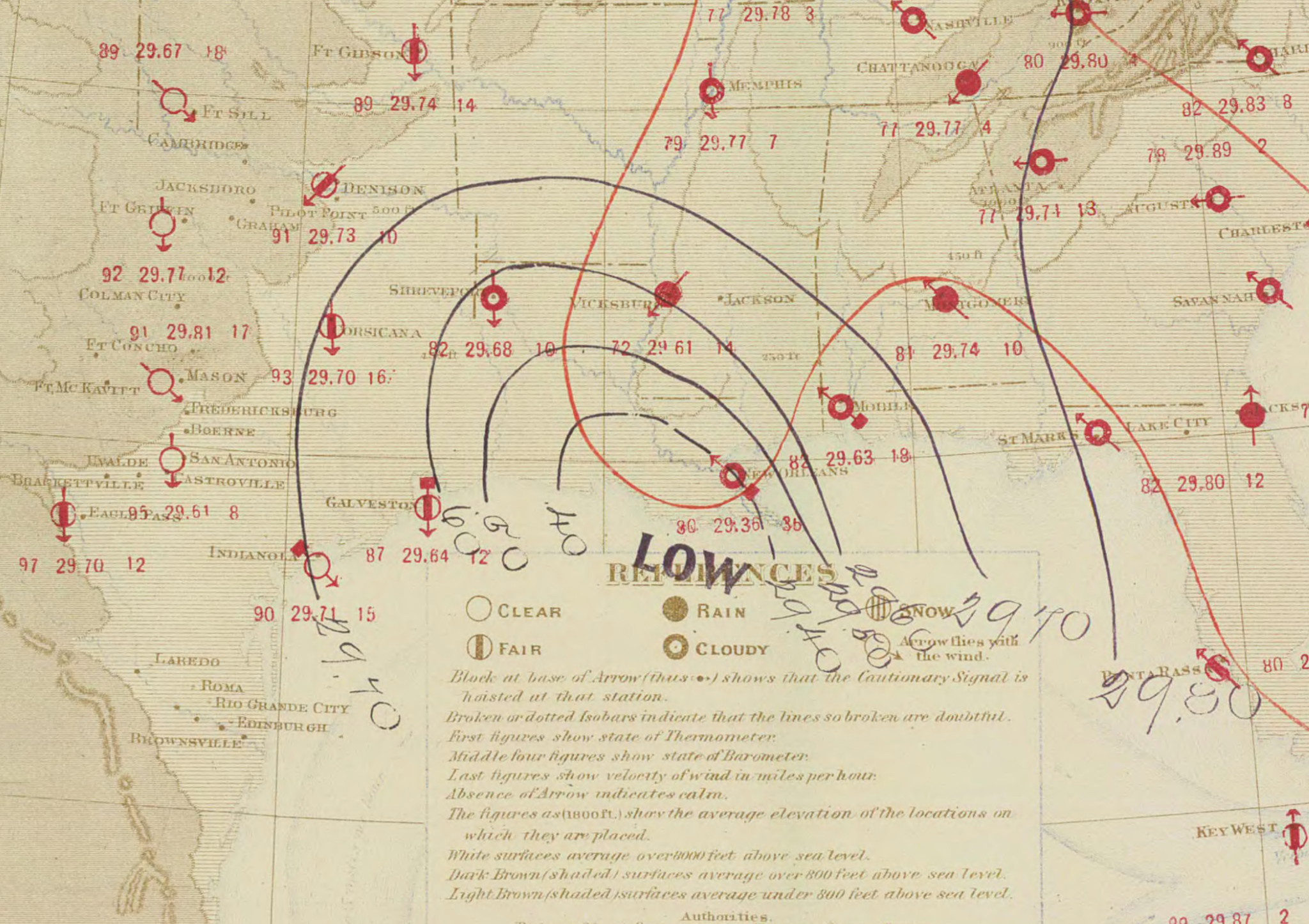
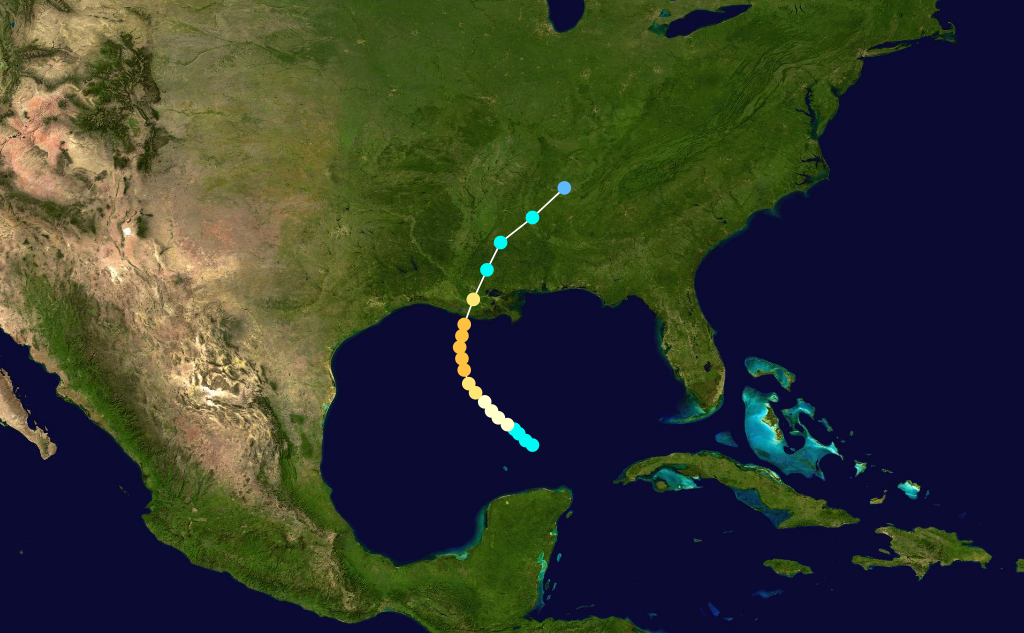
- Duration: August 29 – September 2
- Peak intensity: 125 mph (205 km/h) (1-min); 945 mbar (hPa)

The Louisiana Hurricane of 1879
The official track for this storm begins on August 29 over the south-central Gulf of Mexico, one day before Port Eads, Louisiana, started to report elevated wind speeds. Early on August 30, the storm intensified into a hurricane while heading northwestward and then major hurricane status about one day later. Slightly further strengthening occurred, with the storm estimated to have peaked with winds of 125 mph (205 km/h) due to damage in Morgan City, Louisiana, near where the hurricane made landfall at 16:00 UTC on September 1. In turn, the wind speed and pressures recorded at Morgan City led the Atlantic hurricane reanalysis project to estimate the storm's barometric pressure at 945 mbar (27.9 inHg). Rapid weakening occurred after landfall, with the cyclone falling to a tropical storm around 00:00 UTC on September 2. About 18 hours later, the storm weakened to a tropical depression over northern Alabama and subsequently dissipated.

Chenoweth argued that this storm did not form until August 31 but intensified more than HURDAT indicates, making landfall as a Category 3 hurricane. Moving mostly northeastward throughout its duration, the storm dissipated over southern Ontario on September 4. The cyclone produced brisk winds along the Gulf Coast of the United States from Brownsville, Texas, to St. Marks, Florida. In Louisiana, the Morgan City area experienced the worst impacts. Fifteen cabins, two churches, and a sawmill collapsed and sugar houses suffered damage. All streets in the city flooded after Berwick Bay rose approximately 9 ft (2.7 m). Meteorologist David Roth noted in 2010 that "the wind was so intense between Morgan City and Jeanerette that trees were defoliated as if it was winter." The hurricane also destroyed sawmills in the latter. Many trees throughout Iberia and St. Mary Parish. Strong winds in Abbeville toppled a number of homes, fences, and trees, one of which partially deroofed a church. Heavy rainfall caused flooding that swept away bridges. Farther inland, more than half of cotton and most corn crops in St. Landry Parish were ruined. Dwellings also collapsed in Baton Rouge, Bayou Sara, Lewisburg, and Mandeville. Throughout Louisiana, the hurricane caused approximately $500,000 in damage and killed twenty mules, five cattle, and one person. In Mississippi, heavy rains overflowed waterways in the southwestern portions of the state, such as the Amite River, causing significant crop losses, including ruining an estimated 50% of cotton crops in Liberty.

=== Tropical Storm Five ===
- Tropical storm (SSHWS)
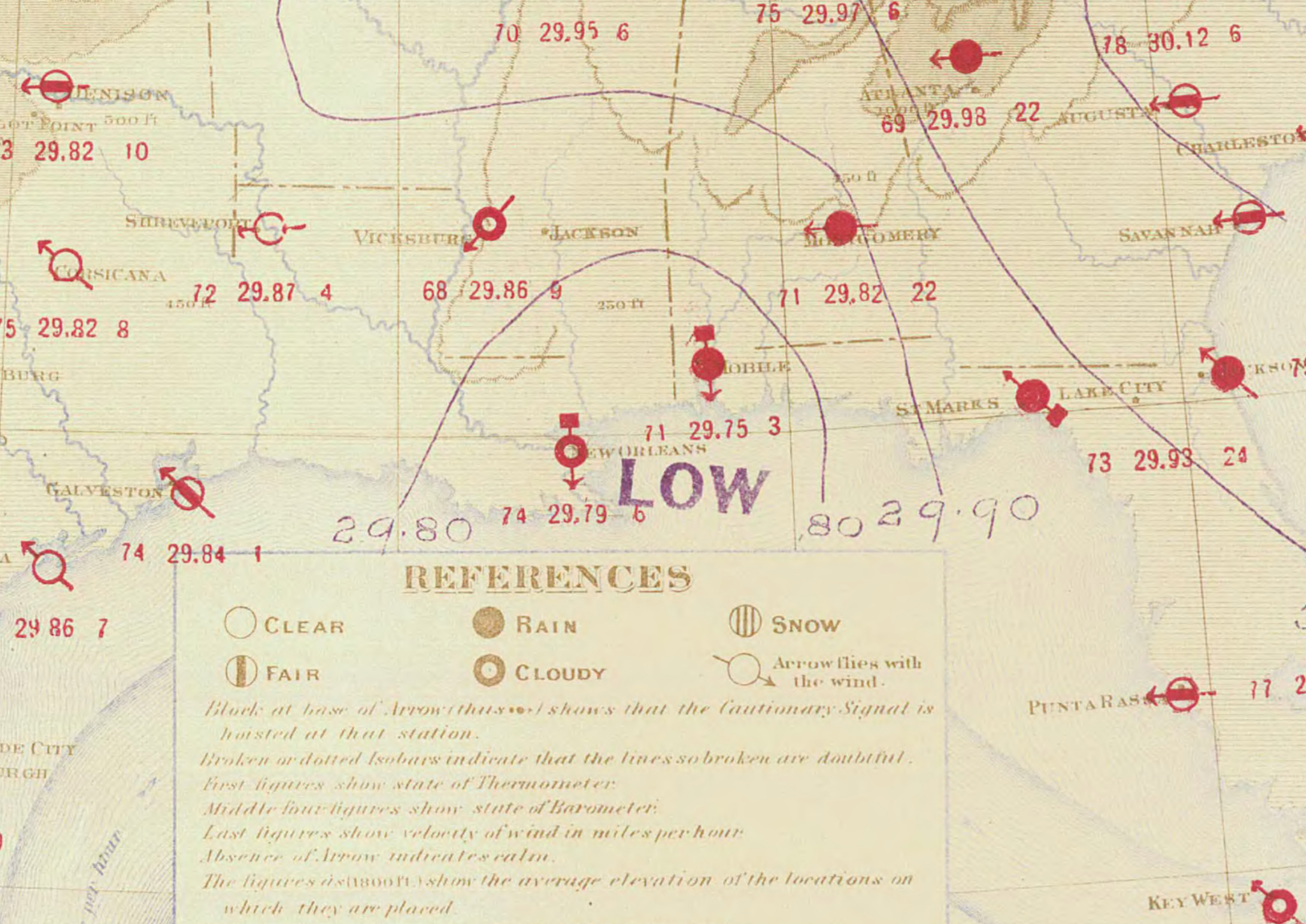
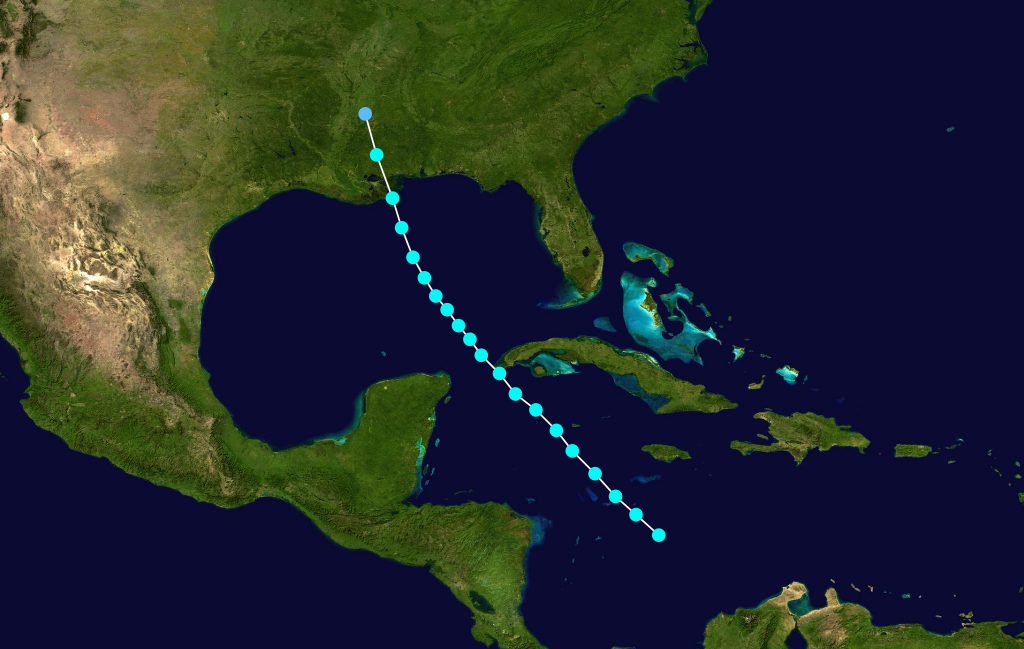
- Duration: October 3 – October 7
- Peak intensity: 60 mph (95 km/h) (1-min);

The Monthly Weather Review documented this storm starting on October 3, with HURDAT beginning the track about 225 mi (360 km) south of Jamaica. Moving northwestward for most of its duration, the cyclone clipped Cuba's Guanahacabibes Peninsula before entering the Gulf of Mexico early on October 5. About 24 hours later, the storm is estimated to have peaked with winds of 60 mph (95 km/h), an intensity that the cyclone held through its landfall near Port Eads, Louisiana, at 05:00 UTC on October 7. Thereafter, the system rapidly weakened and dissipated over central Mississippi about 13 hours later.

Chenoweth proposed that this storm did not exist in the Caribbean and instead developed over the west-central Gulf of Mexico on October 5. The cyclone approached Louisiana on a northwestward trajectory, crossing Plaquemines Parish and then turning northward before making another landfall near Biloxi, Mississippi. A few locations near the storm's path reported falling barometric pressures, while St. Marks, Florida, recorded sustained winds of 25 mph (40 km/h).

=== Tropical Storm Six ===
- Tropical storm (SSHWS)
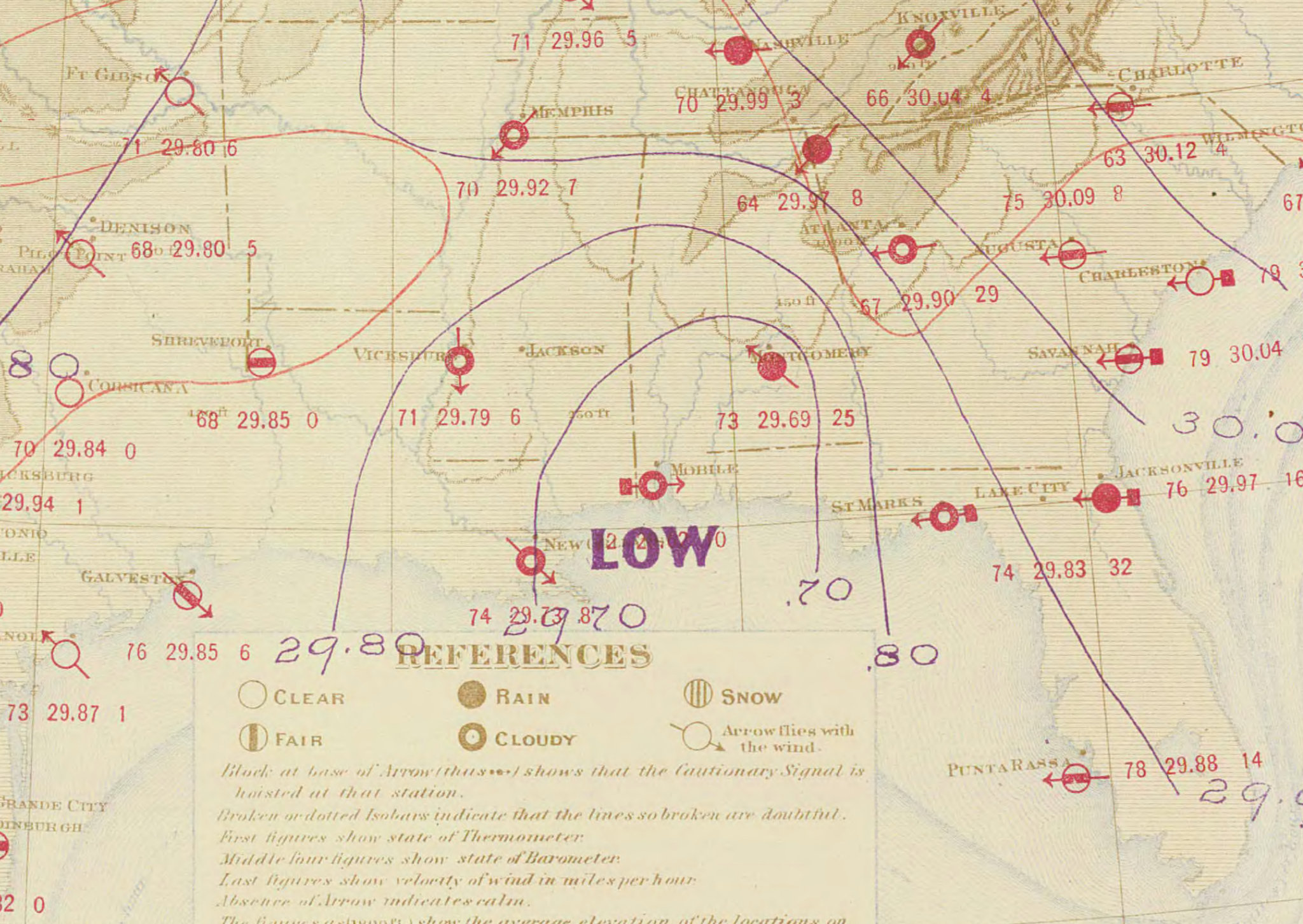
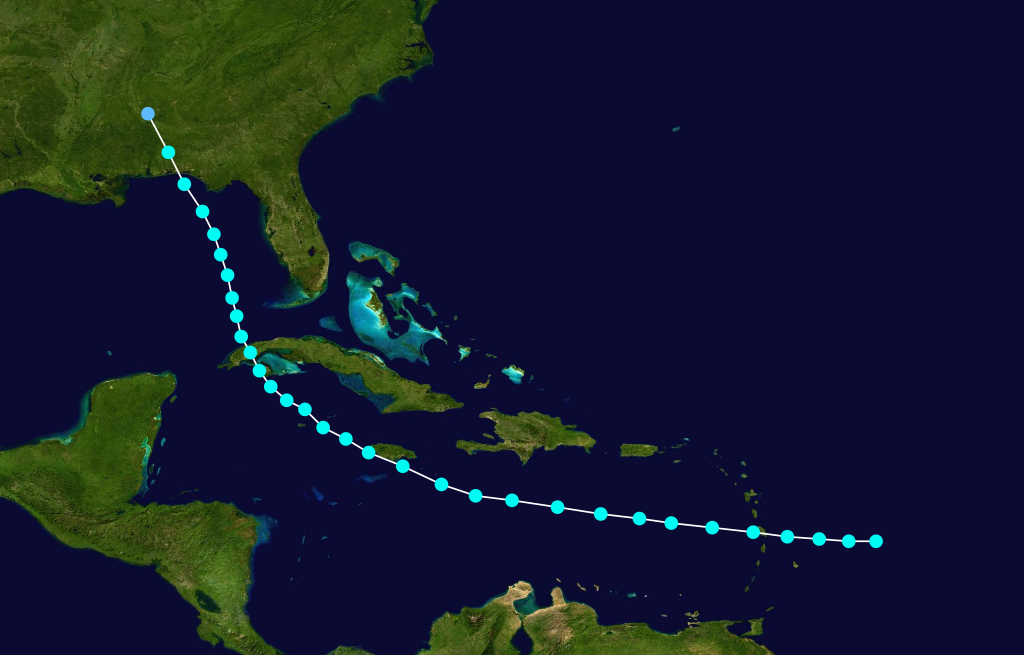
- Duration: October 9 – October 16
- Peak intensity: 60 mph (95 km/h) (1-min);

Similar to the path constructed by meteorologist C. J. Neumann in 1993, the official track begins on October 9 about 240 mi (385 km) east-northeast of Barbados. Moving west-northwestward, the storm passed through the Lesser Antilles on the next day, striking Martinique before entering the Caribbean. On October 12, the cyclone struck or moved very close to Jamaica with winds of 60 mph (95 km/h). Shortly after turning north-northwestward on October 14, the system made landfall in Cuba on Isla de la Juventud and then near La Coloma in Pinar del Río Province. The storm entered the Gulf of Mexico and likely underwent little change in intensity before making its final landfall near Fort Walton Beach, Florida, around 08:00 UTC on October 16. Several hours later, the cyclone dissipated over central Alabama.

Chenoweth's study made no adjustments to the storm's track, but indicated that the cyclone formed as a tropical depression over the east-central Caribbean on October 10 and did not intensify into a tropical storm until October 13. The system produced rainfall on Martinique and Guadeloupe, with the former observing 4.0 in (101 mm) at Fort-de-France in a 48-hour period. Heavy precipitation also fell on Jamaica, including 19.8 in (500 mm) of rain in Kingston, leading to 13 deaths in the city. Additionally, the storm carried away animals, bridges, homes, and crops, downed many telegraph wires, and severely disrupted commerce activity. Some locations along the Gulf Coast of the United States observed rainfall, elevated winds, and falling barometric pressures, including sustained winds of 28 mph (45 km/h) and precipitation of 2.36 in (60 mm) in eight hours at St. Marks, Florida.

=== Hurricane Seven ===
- Category 1 hurricane (SSHWS)
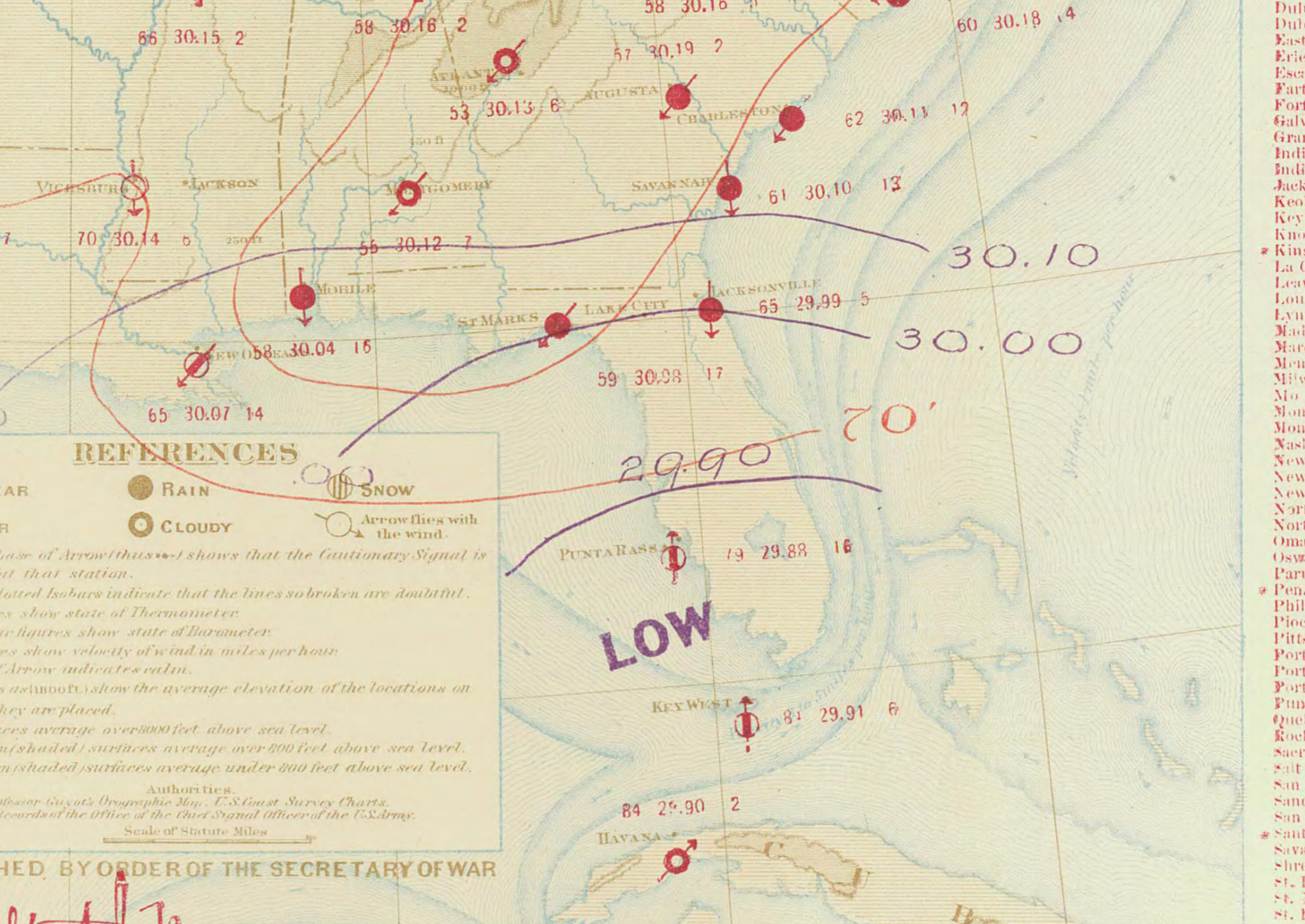
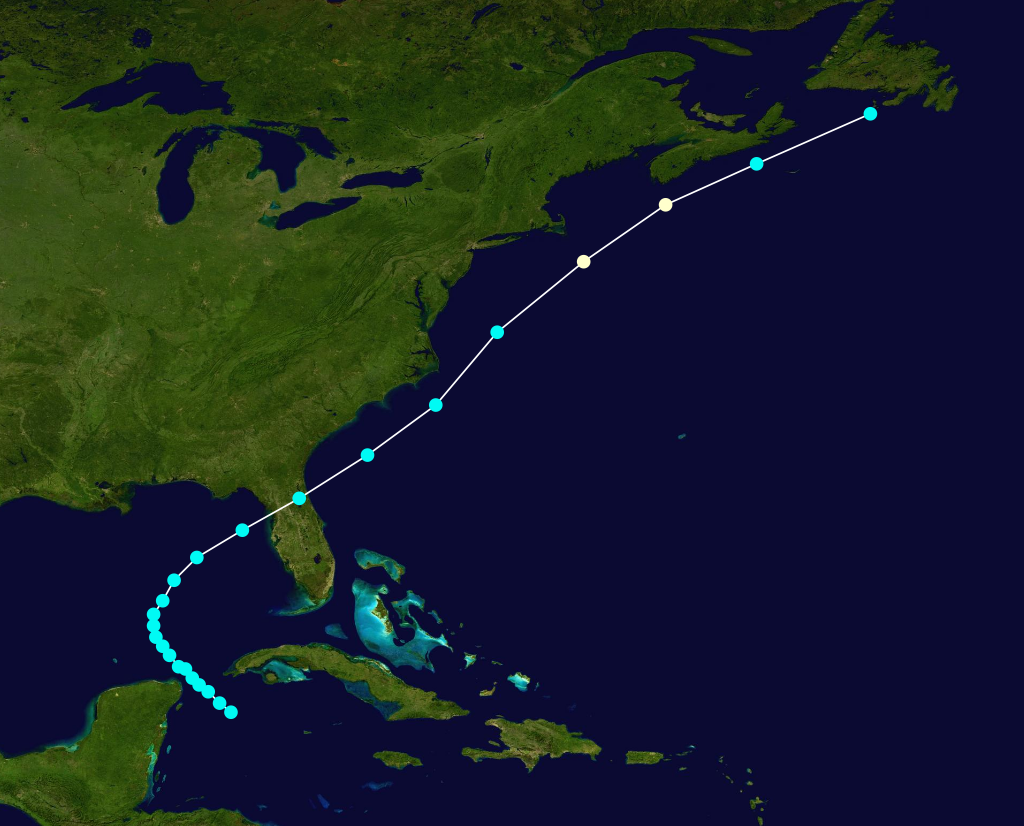
- Duration: October 24 – October 29
- Peak intensity: 80 mph (130 km/h) (1-min);

The official track for this storm begins over the northwestern Caribbean on October 24, one day before some cities along the Gulf Coast of the United States first observed elevated winds. Initially moving northwestward, the cyclone crossed the Yucatán Channel and entered the Gulf of Mexico before turning northeastward on October 26. Around 21:00 UTC the following day, the storm made landfall near Yankeetown, Florida, with winds estimated at 70 mph (110 km/h). Reaching the Atlantic near St. Augustine early on October 28, the cyclone paralleled the East Coast of the United States. Ship reports indicate that the storm likely intensified into a hurricane around 00:00 UTC on October 29 and peaked with maximum sustained winds of 80 mph (130 km/h). However, the system weakened back to a tropical storm about 12 hours later and was last noted that day near Newfoundland's Burin Peninsula.

Chenoweth argued that this system was extratropical, instead noting a gradient between gales over the Gulf of Mexico and a very strong high-pressure area, while an extratropical developed offshore North Carolina. The storm disabled three vessels and capsized another, the schooner Sallie, with all but two of its occupants drowning. Sustained winds reached as a high as 43 mph (69 km/h) at Port Eads, Louisiana, while rainfall in the Southeastern United States peaked at 4.28 in (109 mm) in St. Marks, Florida. Stronger winds impacted the Northeastern United States, including sustained wind speeds in New Jersey of 64 mph (103 km/h) and 48 mph (77 km/h) at Cape May and Sandy Hook, respectively. In Nova Scotia, the hurricane damaged buildings, wharves, and shipping, especially at Canso and Mulgrave, with approximately 70 vessels beached in the Strait of Canso. Farther east, bridges across the Salmon River were swept away. Two people died in the province after a chimney and roof collapsed.

=== Hurricane Eight ===
- Category 2 hurricane (SSHWS)
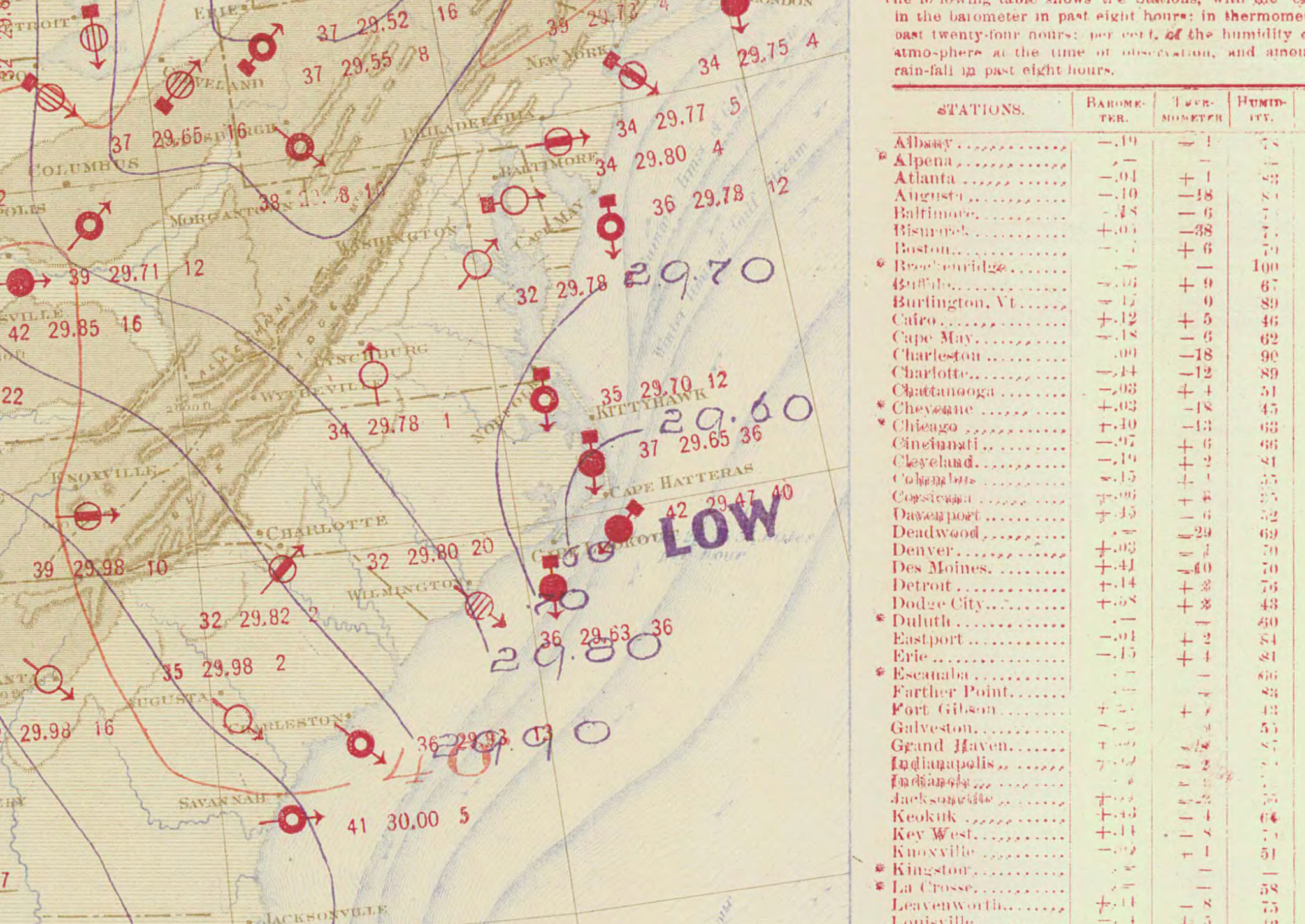
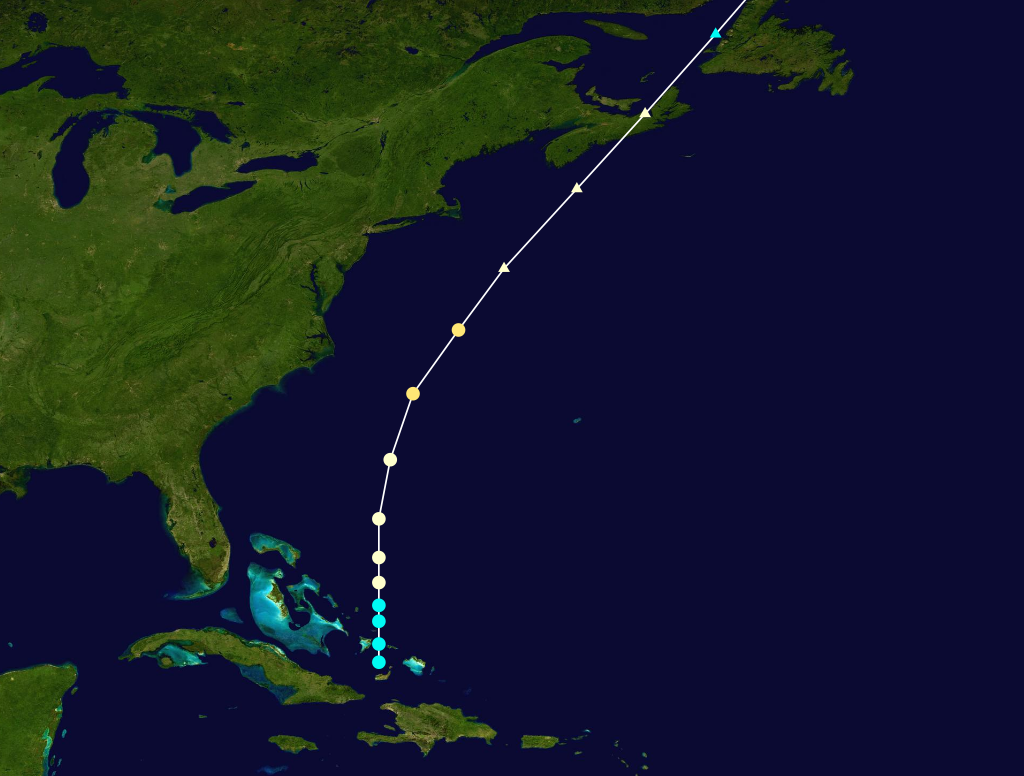
- Duration: November 18 – November 20
- Peak intensity: 105 mph (165 km/h) (1-min);

Although the schooner O. S. Bailey reported gales on November 17, the track listed in HURDAT begins on the next day over the southeastern Bahamas about 35 mi (55 km) north of Inagua. Around 00:00 UTC on November 19, the storm intensified into a hurricane while moving northward. About 24 hours later, it is estimated that the cyclone intensified into a Category 2 hurricane with winds of 105 mph (165 km/h). However, around 12:00 UTC on November 20, the storm transitioned into an extratropical cyclone about 185 mi (300 km) southeast of Nantucket, Massachusetts. Later that day, Halifax, Nova Scotia, recorded a barometric pressure of 968 mbar (28.6 inHg), forming the basis for the peak intensity estimate while the storm was still a tropical cyclone.

Chenoweth concluded that this system was never tropical, due to cold air enveloping the low-pressure area. Parts of the Southeastern United States reported elevated winds and falling barometric pressures, including a sustained wind speed of 45 mph (72 km/h) at Cape Henry, Virginia. In Maryland, the cyclone capsized vessels in the Chesapeake Bay, with "some lives lost" according to the Monthly Weather Review. In Nova Scotia, the extratropical remnants of the storm beached or damaged several vessels along the Straits of Canso and damaged some buildings in the community of Canso.

=== Other storms ===
Chenoweth proposed seven other storms not currently listed in HURDAT. Chenoweth's first proposed new system formed east of the Lesser Antilles on August 15. The cyclone moved west-northwest, striking Guadeloupe on August 17 and then dissipating south of the Virgin Islands on the following day. The next system formed offshore the west coast of Africa on August 15. Heading generally west-northwestward for several days, the cyclone strengthened into a hurricane on August 19, three days before moving in a more northerly direction. Chenoweth last noted the storm west-southwest of the Azores on August 31. The next proposed storm moved in a semicircular path offshore the Southeastern United States from September 8 to September 14 and remained a tropical depression for most of that time. Another storm developed just east of the Windward Islands on September 10, striking Saint Lucia that day. Crossing the Caribbean on a west-northwestward trajectory, the system made landfall on September 16 just south of the Mexico-British Honduras (present-day Belize). After reaching the Bay of Campeche, the cyclone turned southwestward, striking near Paraíso, Tabasco, as a Category 1 hurricane on September 19 and dissipating by the next day.

On September 23, an extratropical cyclone offshore Virginia transitioned into a subtropical storm and then a fully tropical storm several hours later. Moving generally east-northeastward, aside from a brief jog to the east-southeast, the storm transitioned back into an extratropical cyclone late on September 26 while situated northwest of the Azores. The next system formed east of the Windward Islands on October 11. Initially moving northwestward, the storm turned north-northeastward on October 14 and then northeastward on the following day. Late on October 19, the cyclone struck Flores Island in the Azores and continued northeastward before becoming extratropical on October 20. Chenoweth's final proposed storm existed over the far eastern Atlantic, developing northwest of the Cabo Verde Islands on November 5. Trekking northeastward, the cyclone intensified into a hurricane that day. After moving northward between late on November 6 and early on November 7, the storm then turned northwestward and transitioned into an extratropical cyclone south of the Azores several hours later.

== Season effects ==
This is a table of all of the known storms that formed in the 1879 Atlantic hurricane season. It includes their known duration (within the basin), areas affected, damages, and death totals. Deaths in parentheses are additional and indirect (an example of an indirect death would be a traffic accident), but were still related to that storm. Damage and deaths include totals while the storm was extratropical, a wave, or a low, and all of the damage figures are in 1879 USD.

Saffir–Simpson scale
| TD | TS | C1 | C2 | C3 | C4 | C5 |

1879 North Atlantic tropical cyclone season statistics
| Storm name | Dates active | Storm category at peak intensity | Max 1-min wind mph (km/h) | Min. press. (mbar) | Areas affected | Damage (US$) | Deaths | Ref(s). |
|---|---|---|---|---|---|---|---|---|
| One | August 9–12 | Category 1 hurricane | 80 (130) | Unknown | None | None | 2 | |
| Two | August 13–20 | Category 3 hurricane | 115 (185) | 971 | Lesser Antilles, Turks and Caicos Islands, the Bahamas, East Coast of the United States (North Carolina and Massachusetts), Atlantic Canada (Nova Scotia and Newfoundland) | Unknown | 54 | |
| Three | August 19–24 | Category 2 hurricane | 105 (165) | 964 | Mexico (Quintana Roo), Gulf Coast of the United States (Louisiana) | Unknown | 2 | |
| Four | August 29 – September 2 | Category 3 hurricane | 125 (205) | 945 | Gulf Coast of the United States (Louisiana) | >$500,000 | 1 | |
| Five | October 3–7 | Tropical storm | 60 (95) | Unknown | Cuba, Gulf Coast of the United States (Louisiana) | Unknown | None | |
| Six | October 9–16 | Tropical storm | 60 (95) | Unknown | Lesser Antilles (Martinique), Greater Antilles (Jamaica and Cuba), Gulf Coast of the United States (Louisiana) | Unknown | 13 | |
| Seven | October 24–29 | Category 1 hurricane | 80 (130) | Unknown | Gulf Coast of the United States (Florida), Atlantic Canada | Unknown | >2 | |
| Eight | November 18–20 | Category 2 hurricane | 105 (165) | Unknown | East Coast of the United States, Atlantic Canada | Unknown | Unknown | |
Season aggregates
| 8 systems | August 9 – November 20 | | 125 (205) | 945 | | >$500,000 | >74 | |

== See also ==
- Tropical cyclone observation
- Atlantic hurricane reanalysis project
