= Hebert House =

Hebert House may refer to:

in the United States (by state then town)

- Hebert House (Brusly, Louisiana), listed on the National Register of Historic Places (NRHP) in West Baton Rouge Parish
- Hebert House (Lake Arthur, Louisiana), listed on the NRHP in Cameron Parish
- Louis Hebert House, Davenport, Iowa, listed on the NRHP in Scott County
