= Louis Hebert (disambiguation) =

Louis Hebert may refer to the following:

== People ==
- Louis Hébert, early Quebec farmer
- Louis Hébert (officer), Confederate soldier
- Louis-Charles-Auguste Hébert, French religious
- Louis-Philippe Hébert, Canadian sculptor

== Places ==
- Louis Hebert House, a structure in Davenport, Iowa
- Louis-Hébert (provincial electoral district), a local political district in Quebec, Canada
- Louis-Hébert (federal electoral district), a national political district in Quebec, Canada
