= West Rigolets Light =

Lighthouse in Louisiana, US

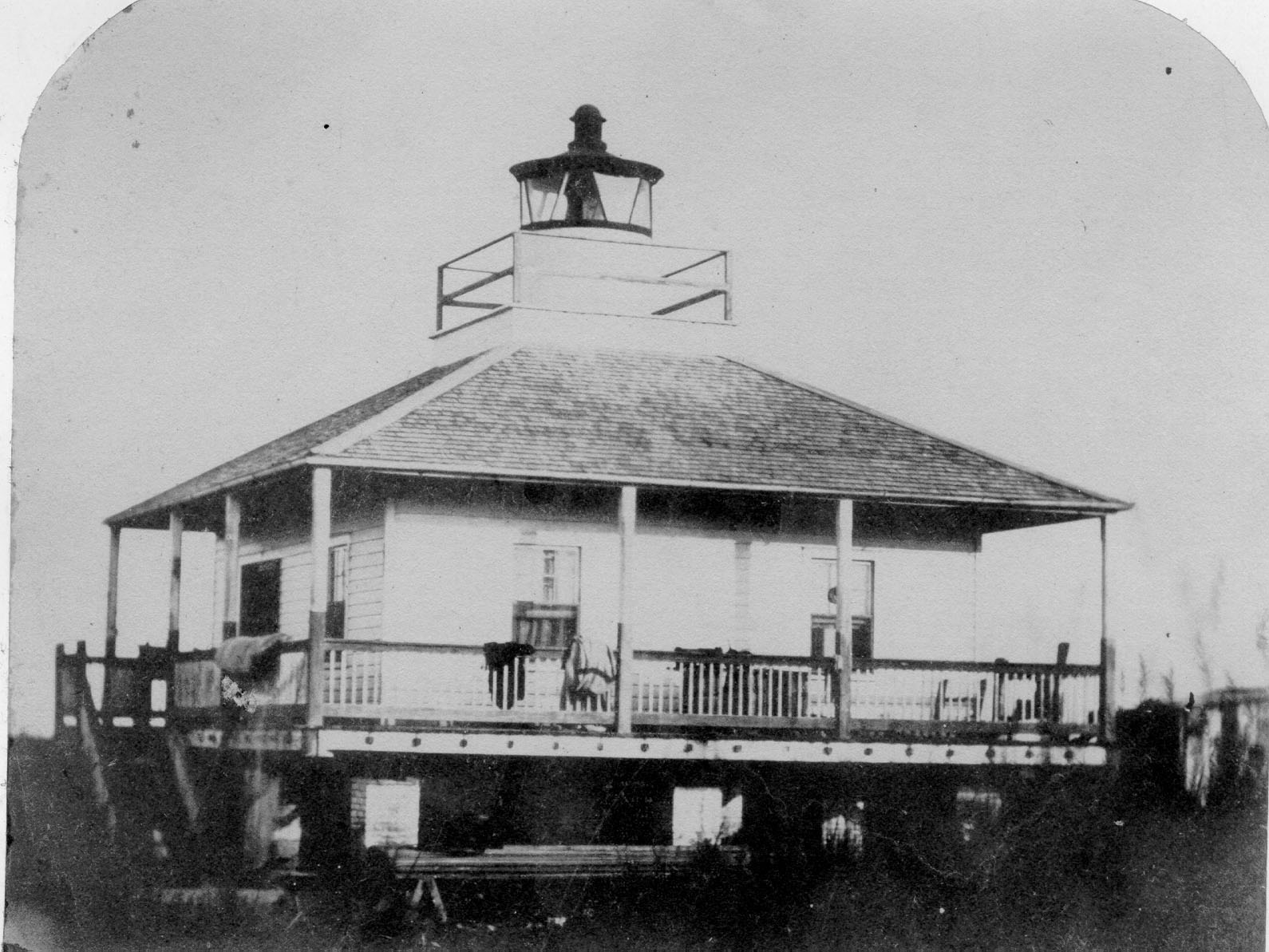
- West Rigolets Light in 1800s (USCG)
- Location: south side of the Rigolets where it meets Lake Pontchartrain
- Coordinates: 30°10′33″N 89°44′34″W

Tower
- Constructed: 1855
- Foundation: pilings
- Construction: Wooden house with lantern on roof
- Shape: Square
- Markings: White with black lantern

Light
- First lit: 1855
- Deactivated: 1939/1945?
- Focal height: 29 feet (8.8 m)
- Lens: 5th order Fresnel

The West Rigolets Light was a lighthouse which stood at the west end of the Rigolets where the channel meets Lake Pontchartrain. Built in 1855, it was deactivated sometime around World War II and was destroyed by Hurricane Katrina in 2005.

== History ==
This light was built to supplement the East Rigolets Light, which marked the other end of the passage and which was built by the Pleasonton administration in 1838. It was constructed in 1855 as part of a set of four lights which were erected around Lake Pontchartrain that year, all to the same design: a square house with an overhanging hipped roof, the lantern at the peak. The light was extinguished at the beginning of the Civil War, but as Union forces gained control of the area it was relit in November 1862, using a ship's lantern. Two days later the keeper, Thomas Harrison, was found shot to death. He was the only keeper killed on duty during the war. A year later the light was renovated and equipped with a fifth-order Fresnel lens. Storm damage was a constant issue, with major repairs coming in 1888 to erect a new breakwater and wharf, and after the hurricane of 1915, the house was put on a new foundation of concrete pilings which raised it by six feet.

The light was deactivated around World War II (sources differ as to whether it went dark in 1939 or 1945) but survived for many years, supplanted by an automated post light and day marker located further offshore; it was sold to private interests but was left unmaintained. It was finally destroyed by Hurricane Katrina in 2005.
