= National Register of Historic Places listings in Cameron Parish, Louisiana =

Location of Cameron Parish in Louisiana

This is a list of the National Register of Historic Places listings in Cameron Parish, Louisiana.

This is intended to be a complete list of the properties on the National Register of Historic Places in Cameron Parish, Louisiana, United States. The locations of National Register properties for which the latitude and longitude coordinates are included below, may be seen in a map.

There are 2 properties listed on the National Register in the parish.

This National Park Service list is complete through NPS recent listings posted May 23, 2025.

== Current listings ==
	Name on the Register	Image	Date listed	Location	City or town	Description
1	Hebert House	Hebert House	December 8, 1997 (#97001516)	Along Greenhouse Lane (Parish Road 123), about 500 yards (460 m) east of LA 3056; 30°01′30″N 92°46′14″W	Lowry	
2	Sabine Pass Lighthouse	Sabine Pass Lighthouse	December 17, 1981 (#81000290)	Eastern shore of Sabine Pass, south of Lighthouse Bayou. About 32 miles (51 km) west of Cameron; 29°42′59″N 93°51′01″W	Cameron	Historic lighthouse; no longer in service.

== See also ==
- List of National Historic Landmarks in Louisiana
- National Register of Historic Places listings in Louisiana
