= CSX Rigolets Pass Bridge =

Bridge in Louisiana, United States

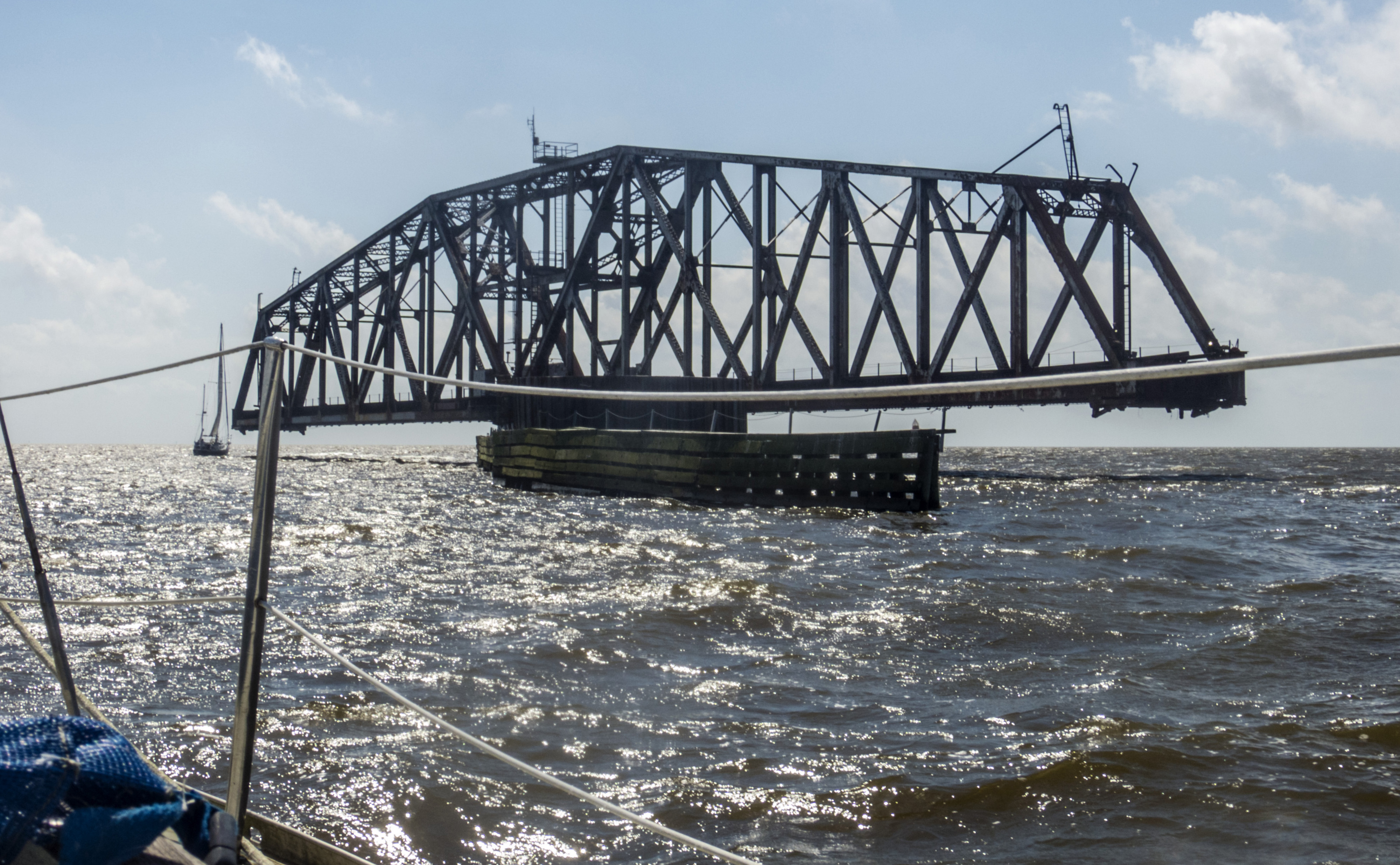
- Coordinates: 30°09′19″N 89°37′51″W
- Carries: 1 track of CSX
- Crosses: Rigolets
- Locale: New Orleans and St. Tammany Parish

Characteristics
- Design: truss bridge with a swing section
- Total length: 4,555 feet (1,388 m)

The CSX Rigolets Pass Bridge carries one track of CSX Transportation across the Rigolets on the eastern side of Lake Pontchartrain between New Orleans and St. Tammany Parish, near Slidell.

== Accidents ==
Louisville & Nashville freight train number 71 derailed on the morning of January 7, 1896. The locomotive and 20 boxcars derailed and sank 50 feet underwater. 12 people died, one man nearly drowned, a telegraph operator was one of the many people that went missing, Jas Kenn, a German, nearly drowned and was badly crippled. The rest of the crew also survived the wreck. The cause of the accident was the engineer who didn't observe the regulations of the approach to the draw, running the red signal
