= Hebert House (Lake Arthur, Louisiana) =

Historic house in Louisiana, United States

- U.S. National Register of Historic Places
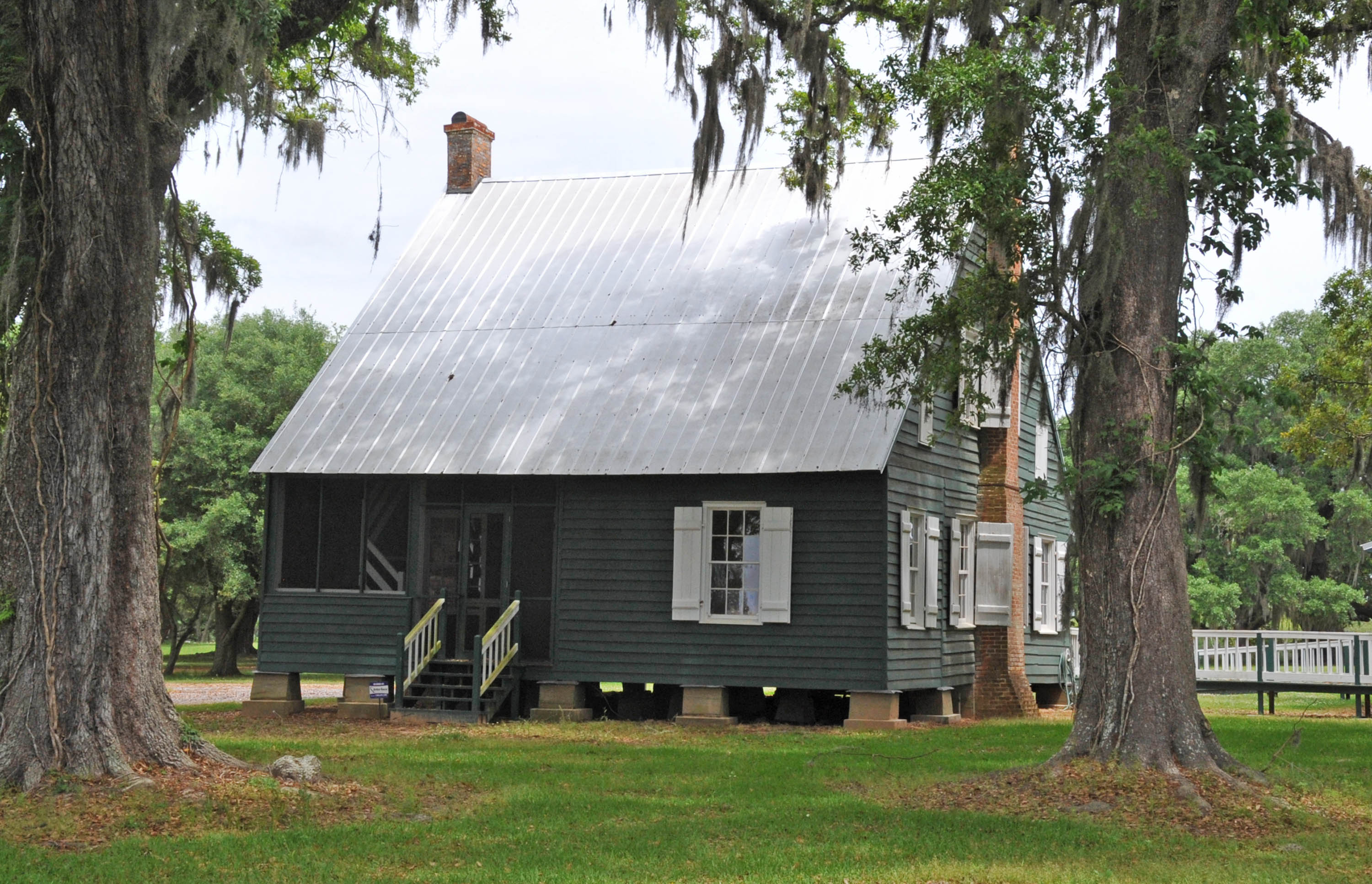

- Location within Louisiana Location within the United States
- Location: Along Greenhouse Lane (Parish Road 123), about 500 yards (460 m) east of LA 3056
- Nearest city: Lake Arthur, Louisiana
- Coordinates: 30°01′30″N 92°46′14″W
- Area: 3.7 acres (1.5 ha)
- Built: c. 1840
- Architectural style: French Creole
- MPS: Louisiana's French Creole Architecture MPS
- NRHP reference No.: 97001516
- Added to NRHP: December 8, 1997

The Hebert House, also known as The Green House, is a historic house located near the intersection of Greenhouse Lane (Parish Road 123) and LA 3056 in Cameron Parish, Louisiana.

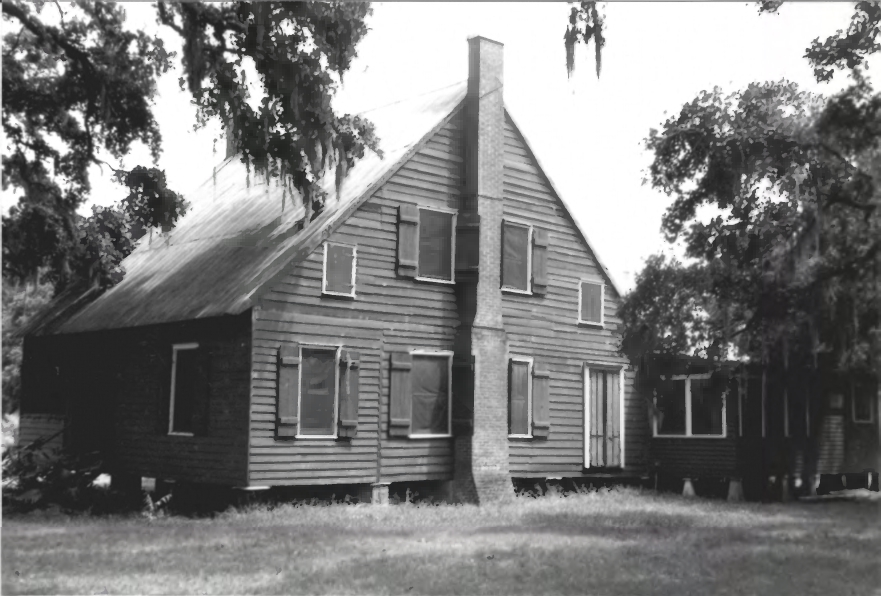
Hebert House in 1997.

Built circa 1840 for cattleman Alexander Hebert, the house is one of the oldest remaining buildings in Southwest Louisiana. The house has a French Creole design; while common in Louisiana, the style is rare in its southwestern corner, which has few examples of styles predating Queen Anne architecture. The design features a large, steep gable roof, braced frame construction filled in with bousillage, and a brick cornice. The house's interior has a typical Acadian Creole layout, with a four-room first floor with no hall and a single-room second floor for sleeping.

The house was added to the National Register of Historic Places on December 8, 1997.

== See also ==
- National Register of Historic Places listings in Cameron Parish, Louisiana
