= East Rigolets Light =

Lighthouse in Louisiana, US

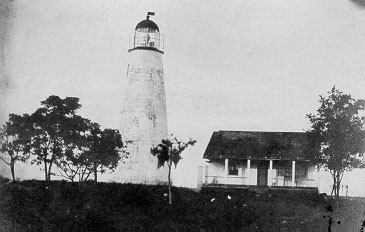
- East Rigolets Light (USCG)
- Location: Rabbit Island at Lake Borgne end of the Rigolets
- Coordinates: 30.155°N 89.650°W

Tower
- Constructed: 1833
- Construction: Masonry tower
- Shape: Conical
- Markings: White with black lantern

Light
- First lit: 1833
- Deactivated: 1874
- Focal height: 60 feet (18 m)
- Lens: original: ten lamps w/reflectors 4th Order Fresnel lens

The East Rigolets Light was an early lighthouse marking the entrance to the Rigolets from Lake Borgne in Louisiana. It was deactivated in 1874 and destroyed sometime after 1923.

== History ==
This light was built in Stephen Pleasonton's administration, and the light was commonly referred as "Pleasonton's Light". While construction funds were provided in 1831, the light was not completed until two years later, built according to the usual plan of the time of a conical masonry tower housing an array of ten Argand lamps with reflectors; this was eventually replaced with a fourth-order Fresnel lens. It was located on present-day Rabbit Island (then named Pleasonton Island) opposite the mouth of the Pearl River.

While the original keeper Isaac H. Smith served for seven years, his immediate successors were not so creditable: the first was dismissed for drunkenness, and from 1840 to 1844 there were no less than five keepers. Not surprisingly, the state of the light suffered.

Like other southern lights, it was extinguished at the commencement of the Civil War, but was relit in November 1862. In 1868, the lantern was replaced, with the top of the tower being rebuilt to hold it. The light was extinguished in 1874, however, having been deemed unnecessary. The tower remained as a landmark for many years thereafter, finally being sold in 1923 and destroyed sometime thereafter.
