= Blue Norther (weather) =

Type of Fast moving cold weather front

A Blue Norther, also known as a Texas Norther or blue whistler, is a fast moving cold front marked by a rapid drop in temperature, strong winds, and dark blue or "black" skies. The cold front originates from the north, hence the "norther", and can send temperatures plummeting by 20 or 30 degrees in merely minutes.

== Effects ==
The Midwestern United States lacks natural geographic barriers to protect itself from the frigid winter air masses that originate in Canada and the arctic. Multiple times per year conditions will become favorable to push severe cold fronts as far south as Texas, bringing sleet and snow and causing the windchill to plunge into the teens. Depending on the time of year, high temperatures that immediately precede a Texas Norther can reach 85 °F (29°C) or even 90 °F (32°C) under bright sunlight in nearly-calm conditions before the cold front approaches.

However, most Blue Northers do not advance as far south as Mexico, and even the most severe examples typically reach their apex midway through Texas. For example, cities in North Texas, like Dallas, experience drastically more Blue Northers than cities along the Gulf of Mexico, like Houston. As a city is struck by a Blue Norther, its temperatures can be 30 to 50 degrees colder than neighboring cities that are only a few miles away that have not yet been struck. Blue Northers can be dangerous due to their volatile temperature swings which catch some people unprepared.

== Frequency ==
Blue Northers occur multiple times per year. They are usually recorded between the months of November and March, although they have been recorded less frequently in October and April as well. The Blue Norther phenomenon is especially common in November, when the last vestiges of autumn are still clinging to life. One of the most famous Blue Northers was the Great Blue Norther of November 11, 1911, which spawned multiple tornadoes and dropped temperatures 40 degrees in only 15 minutes and 67 degrees in 10 hours, a world record.

== See also ==
- Weather front
