= Sabine Pass Lighthouse =

Lighthouse in Louisiana, US

Sabine Pass Light
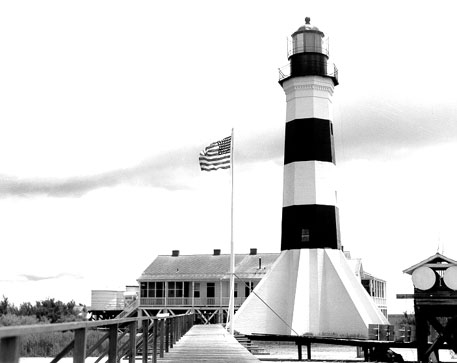
- Sabine Pass Light
- Location: Cameron Parish, Louisiana
- Coordinates: 29°42′59″N 93°51′01″W

Tower
- Constructed: 1856
- Foundation: Brick buttresses / shellcrete
- Construction: Brick
- Height: 75 feet (23 m)
- Shape: Octagon with eight buttresses
- Markings: White with black stripe, "rocket ship"
- Heritage: National Register of Historic Places listed place

Light
- First lit: 1856
- Deactivated: 1952
- Focal height: 85 feet (26 m)
- Lens: Third order Fresnel lens
- Characteristic: Flashing white 90s
- Sabine Pass Lighthouse
- U.S. National Register of Historic Places
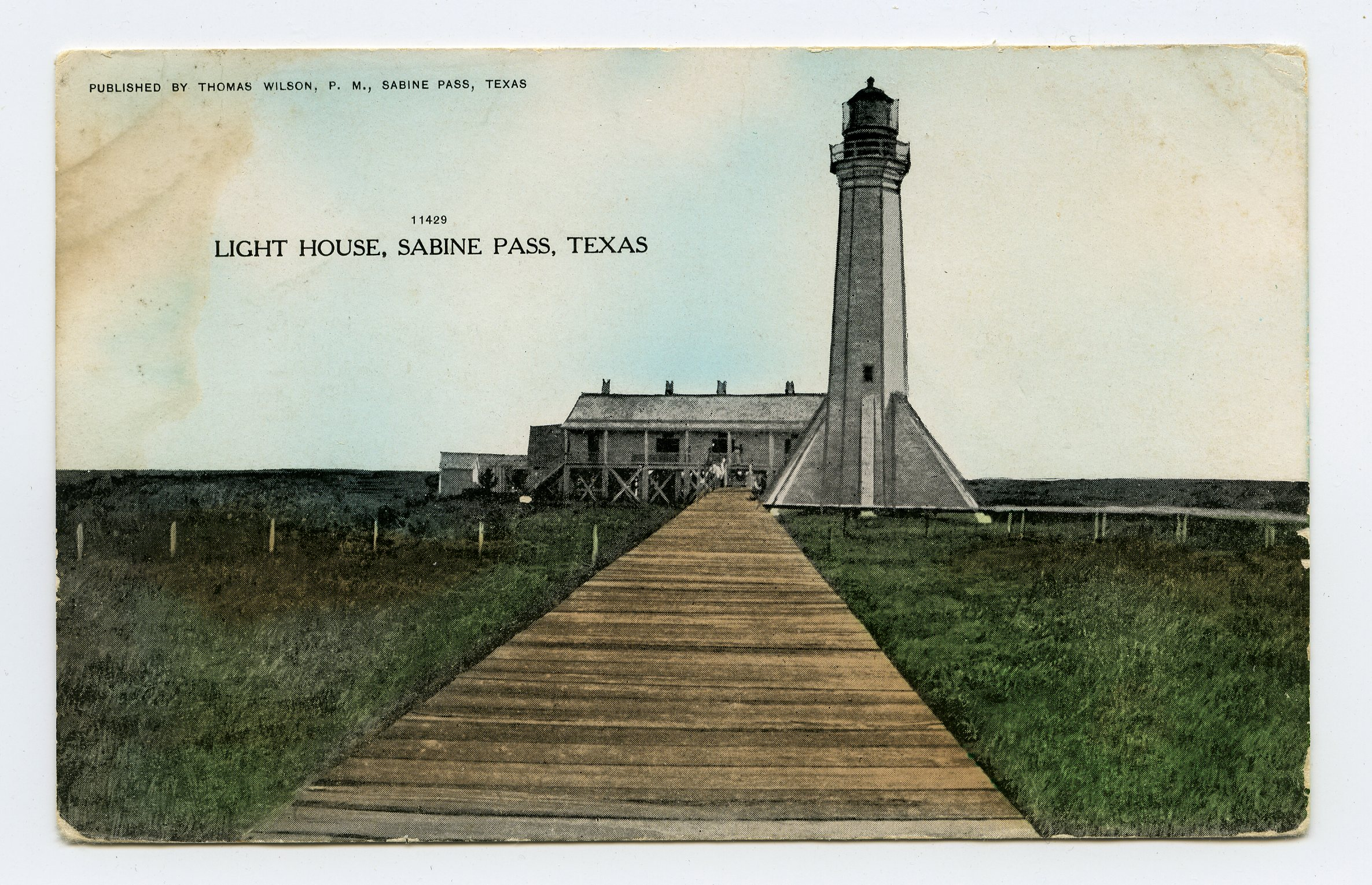
- A postcard of the lighthouse.
- Location: Eastern shore of Sabine Pass, south of Lighthouse Bayou
- Nearest city: Port Arthur, TX
- Coordinates: 29°42′59″N 93°51′01″W
- Area: 2.4 acres (0.97 ha)
- Architectural style: Greek Revival
- NRHP reference No.: 81000290
- Added to NRHP: December 17, 1981

The Sabine Pass Lighthouse, or Sabine Pass Light as it was referred to by the United States Coast Guard, is a historic lighthouse, as part of a gulf coast light station, on the Louisiana side of the Sabine River, in Cameron Parish, across from the community of Sabine Pass, Texas. It was first lit in 1857 and was deactivated by the Coast Guard in 1952. One of only three built in the United States of similar design, the light was listed on the National Register of Historic Places as "Sabine Pass Lighthouse" on December 17, 1981. It is now abandoned but has long continued to be the subject of preservation efforts.

The Calcasieu Historical Preservation Society – with interest because the lighthouse was once in Calcasieu Parish – has listed that the lighthouse may be the oldest brick structure still standing in Southwest Louisiana.

== History ==
On March 3, 1849, the United States Congress appropriated $7,500 for a lighthouse in Sabine Pass. Commander Henry A. Adams was sent to investigate a site location but reported, "the coast is so free from danger in that vicinity, the place itself so easy of access, and the business done there so inconsiderable, that, in my opinion, a light-house is not necessary there at this time." Construction was delayed until further calls for a light prompted a second appropriation in 1853. Captain Danville Leadbetter (later to serve as a Confederate general), whose recommendation was instrumental in bringing about construction, also designed the station.

Construction began in 1855 under the supervision of United States Lighthouse Board (LHS) inspector Walter H. Stevens (also later to serve as a Confederate States general) and took two years. The tower was constructed of brick and was set on a shellcrete and wooden pile foundation. The marshy location led to an unusual system of buttresses radiating from the base of the tower in order to stabilize it. The white-painted tower was equipped with a third order Fresnel lens and lit for the first time in mid-1857.

The beacon was extinguished during the Civil War in 1861, to hinder navigation by Union ships, but was returned to service December 23, 1865 after the Confederate surrender. The tower was used as an observation post by both Confederate and Union soldiers, prompting a skirmish at the light on April 16, 1863; several men were killed. This was five months before the Second Battle of Sabine Pass, which was fought nearby.

The original keeper's dwelling was destroyed by a hurricane in 1886, with the keeper and his wife surviving by holding up in the tower; a new dwelling and accessory buildings were constructed the following year. Another hurricane in 1915 shook the tower so violently that the clockwork for the beacon stopped, and the keeper rotated it by hand to keep the light active.

In the early years of the twentieth century, jetties were constructed in the vicinity of the light, and by 1921 these extended well out into the gulf, necessitating their own navigational beacons. This made the old light increasingly irrelevant, though it continued to be staffed. In 1928 a radio beacon was installed, and the following year the beacon was converted to electricity; the plumbing was upgraded in 1937. A daymark of two black stripes was painted on the tower in 1932, following a suggestion from a Texaco tanker captain, who observed that the white structure was often hard to distinguish in the haze. It was finally deactivated in 1952. The remote location of the light made it vulnerable, and it suffered from vandalism and fires which destroyed the keeper's dwelling and outbuildings.

After years of being passed between various federal and state agencies, the surviving structure was sold at auction in 1985 to a pair of businessmen who had plans to build a marina or restaurant featuring the tower. These plans were never realized, and in 2001 they donated it to the Cameron Preservation Alliance, which has constructed a road to the abandoned and decaying tower, This preservation group has plans to make the 42-acre (0.17 km^{2}) property into a parish historical museum. Cheniere Energy has built an LNG terminal with an improved gravel road passing the plant and ending at the lighthouse property, which they are currently expanding with a liquefaction project on the 853 acres (3.45 km^{2}) they own.

== Current ==
The Sabine Pass Lighthouse is in a severe deteriorated state with some long-term goals for restoration but funding has been a problem since Hurricane Rita as well as possible foundation damages to the lighthouse. The lighthouse isn't forgotten. Both the Cameron Parish and Johnson Bayou libraries "support the lighthouse greatly", according to Cameron Preservation Alliance President Carolyn Thibodeaux. She also stated that $3 million is needed to stabilize the lighthouse. In 2004, the association unsuccessfully tried to secure $10 million funding that would have stabilized the base and built a museum, education center, and gift shop. Thibodeaux believes there is still plenty of interest in the lighthouse. The Calcasieu Historical Preservation Society placed the lighthouse on its list of the area's most endangered structures. Adley Cormier, a preservationist with the society stated, "We need to be aware that it is a shared resource and help might come from both sides of the river." He further said: "It's part of our history, too. It's an opportunity for all Southwest Louisiana to come together." Cormier also said he would like the structure to be thought of as Southwest Louisiana's lighthouse, with the five-parish area, as well as Southeast Texas, chipping in; the lighthouse sits on land that was part of Calcasieu Parish when it was built. Ami Kamara, curator for the Gulf Coast Museum, stated, "When you live on the Gulf, you consider the whole Gulf your home." Kamara said that lighthouses were "such an important part of living on a coast and keeping it safe for the shipping industry" and that East Texans still consider the lighthouse a part of their history as well.

== See also ==
- List of lighthouses in Louisiana
- National Register of Historic Places listings in Cameron Parish, Louisiana
