= Louis Hebert House =

Historic house in Iowa, United States

- U.S. National Register of Historic Places
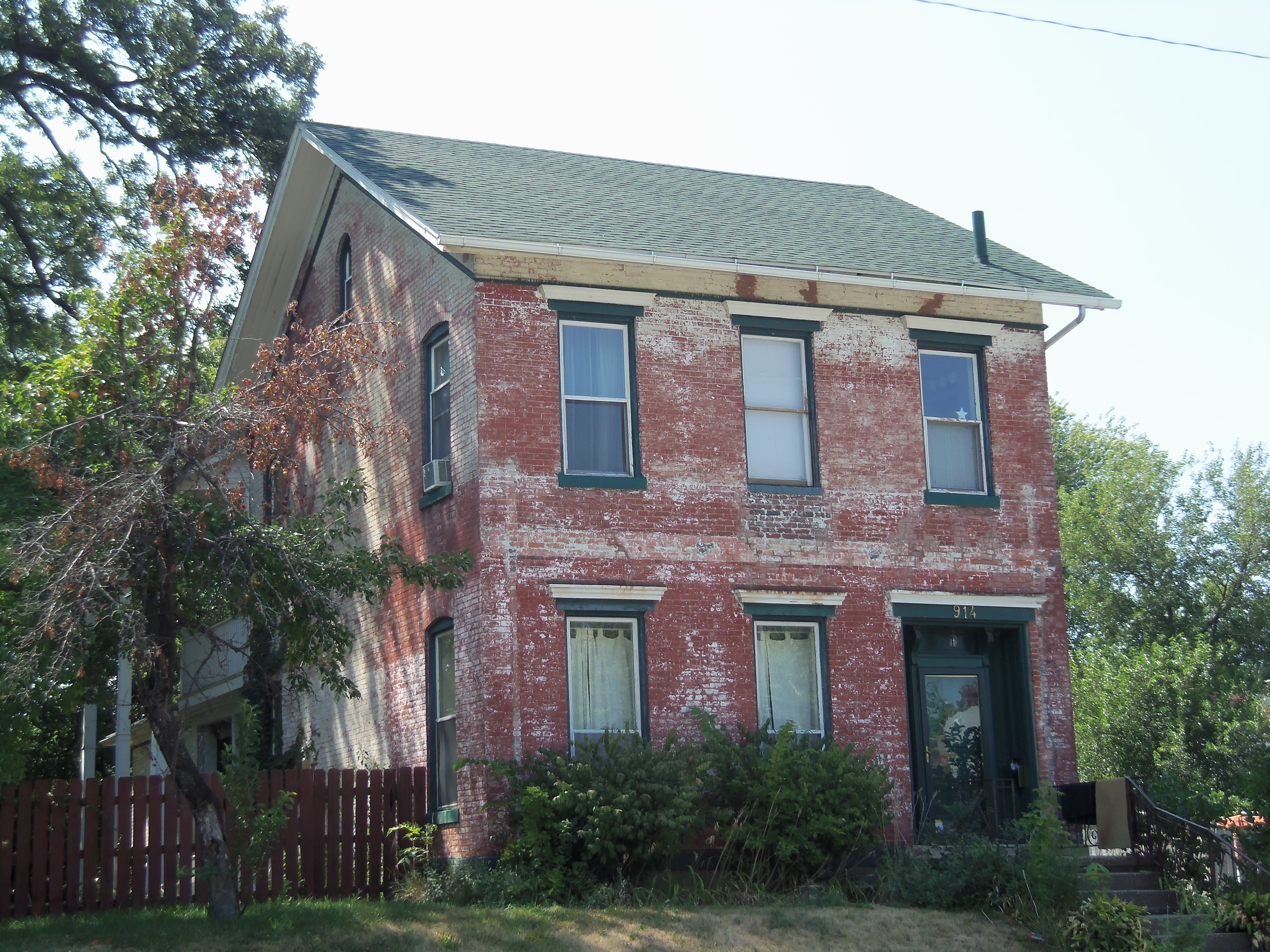

- Location within Iowa Location within the United States
- Location: 914 Farnam St. Davenport, Iowa
- Coordinates: 41°31′46″N 90°34′2″W
- Area: less than one acre
- Built: 1865
- Built by: Louis Hebert
- Architectural style: Greek Revival
- MPS: Davenport MRA
- NRHP reference No.: 83002443
- Added to NRHP: July 7, 1983

The Louis Hebert House is a historic building located on the east side of Davenport, Iowa, United States. The property was listed on the National Register of Historic Places in 1983.

== History ==
Louis Hebert was a bricklayer and may have built this house himself. The Hebert family continued to live here until 1898. Joseph Herbert was the city clerk in the 1890s and was the last family member to reside in this house. This house was built during Davenport's first major growth period and is typical of the architecture built in the city in the 1850s and 1860s.

== Architecture ==
The two-story, brick house was built in a vernacular form of the Greek Revival style. It features a side-gabled roof and a wide entrance that was placed off-center. The three symmetrically placed windows on the second floor and the two on the first floor are capped by simple, molded cornices. The full porch on the front has subsequently been removed.
