= Trinity Shoal Light =

Lighthouse in Louisiana, US

Coordinates: 29.2°N 92.2°W

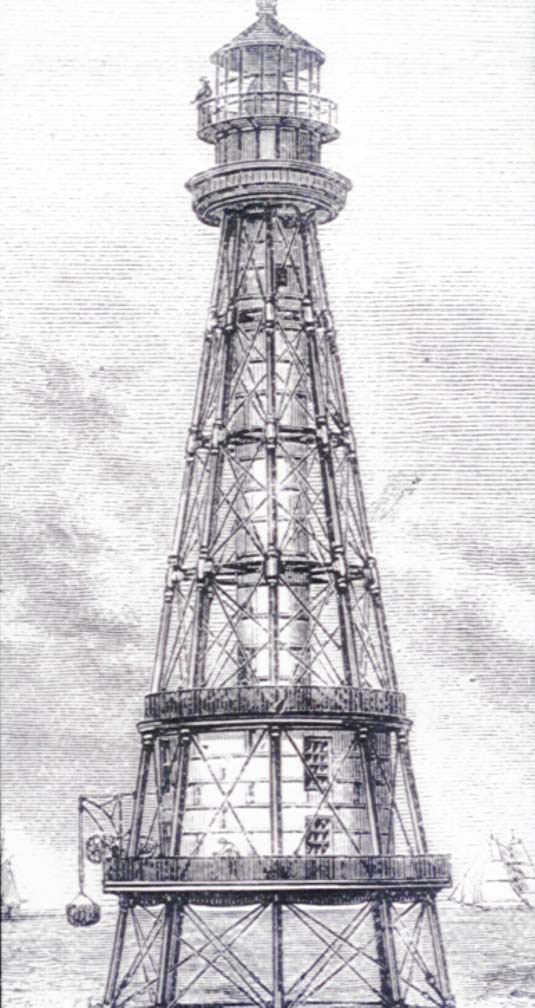
Artist's rendering of Trinity Shoal Light

The Trinity Shoal Light was a planned lighthouse meant to be constructed on Trinity Shoal in the Gulf of Mexico, off the coast of Louisiana. Had it been completed, the skeleton tower would have been among the most exposed lighthouses in the United States.

Funds were appropriated for the lighthouse by the U. S. Congress in 1871, but construction progressed slowly. The site was some 20 miles (32 km) away from the nearest land, and contractors had great difficulty in laying the foundation for a tower. It was decided that workers would be housed in a shelter on a platform on the site; this was finally completed in 1873 and work began in earnest.

On November 16, 1873, the site was struck by a strong hurricane. The lighthouse tender attached to the site, which was carrying most of the materials needed to build the tower, was wrecked; her crew were rescued by a nearby steamer. Although it was decided that the workmen should remain on station, on November 18 the continued rough weather destroyed their quarters and scattered the 16 men into the sea. Remarkably, all 16 were saved by the same steamer that had rescued the tender's crew two days previously.

As a result of the weather troubles, the Lighthouse Board decided that a tower was no longer needed on the shoal, and called off construction. Some of the materials were later salvaged and used in the building of the Southwest Pass Light. Trinity Shoal was marked with a lightvessel which was eventually replaced by a small automatic light.
