= Rigolets =

Tidal strait in Louisiana, United States

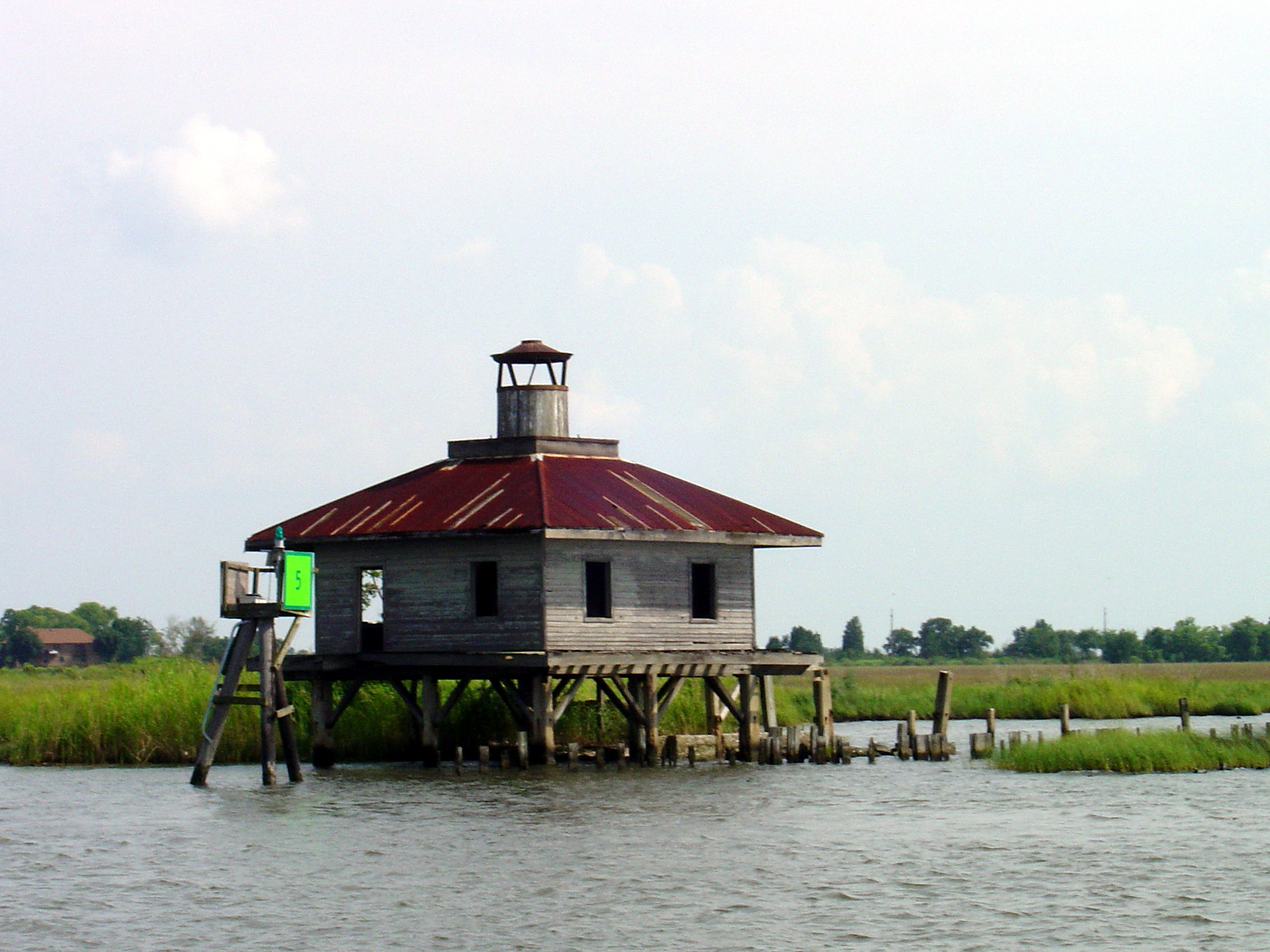
- The abandoned West Rigolets Light in 2004. It was destroyed by Hurricane Katrina in 2005.

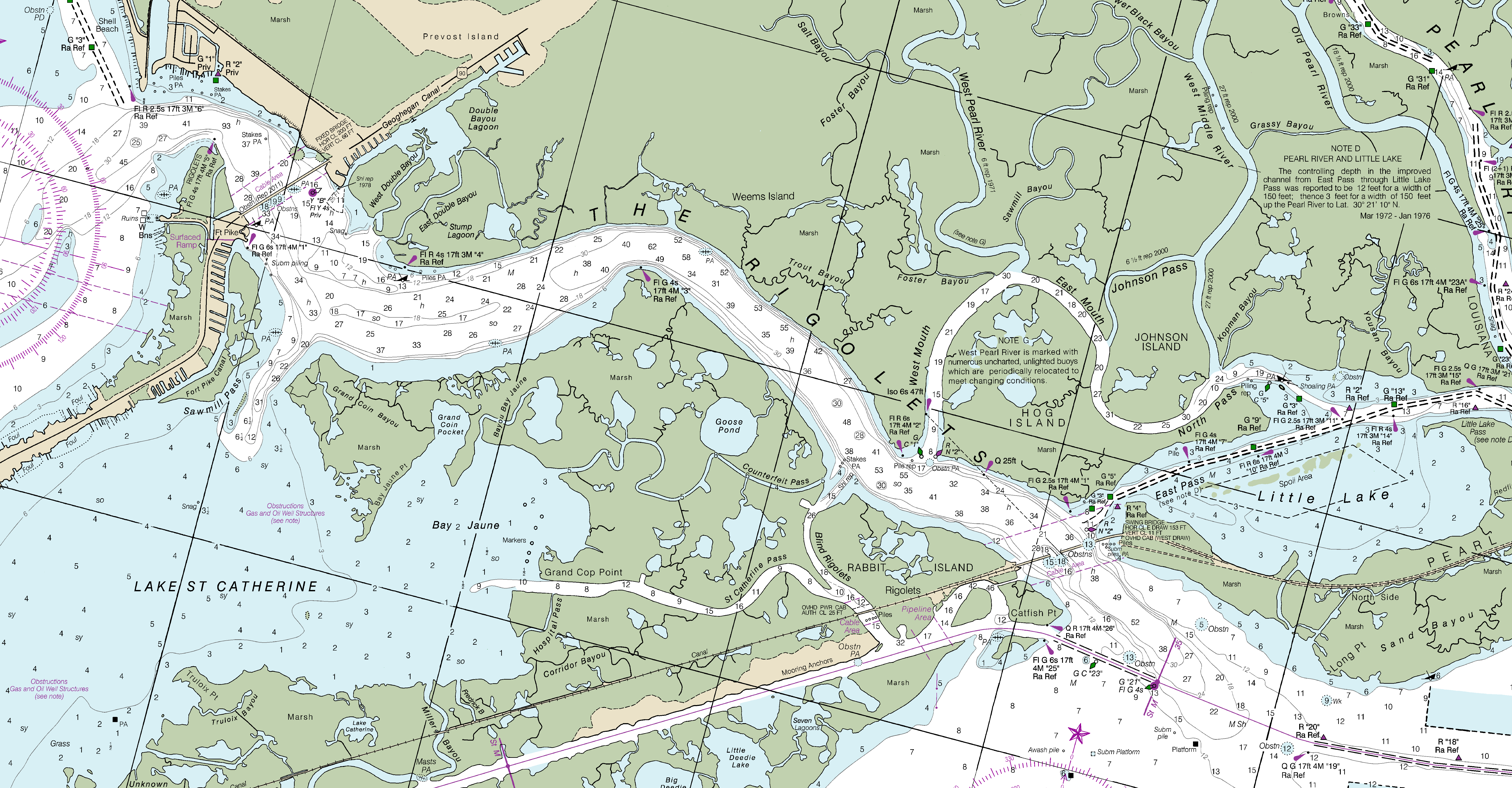
- NOAA Coast Survey nautical map 2016

- Location within Louisiana

Location
- Country: United States
- State: Louisiana

Physical characteristics
- Source: Lake Pontchartrain
  - coordinates: 30.177778°N 89.744444°W
- Mouth: Lake Borgne
  - coordinates: 30.154444°N 89.625278°W
- Length: 8 mi (13 km)

Basin features
- Tributaries
  - left: Old Pearl River
  - right: Sawmill Pass

The Rigolets is a 8-mile-long (13 km) deepwater tidal strait in Louisiana. "Rigolets" comes from the word rigole, French for 'trench' or 'gutter'. The name is now locally pronounced "RIG-uh-leez".

The strait begins at 30°10′40″N 89°44′40″W and follows a generally eastward course to Lake Borgne, a lagoon in the Gulf of Mexico, and finally to the Gulf of Mexico, where it ends at 30°09′16″N 89°37′31″W. Along with nearby Chef Menteur Pass, the Rigolets connects Lake Pontchartrain and Lake St. Catherine in Louisiana to Lake Borgne, and then to the Gulf of Mexico. It forms the boundary between New Orleans (Orleans Parish) and St. Tammany Parish.

== Tidal pass ==
As a deepwater tidal pass, the Rigolets helps supply salt water from the Gulf to Lake Pontchartrain. Tidal scouring has produced a deep pit in the lake at the western mouth of the strait. Since the Rigolets is a channel through which Gulf storm surges can approach the New Orleans area, there have been proposals to construct floodgates to try to protect the city, especially since the destructiveness of hurricanes in the early 21st century.

== Fort Pike ==
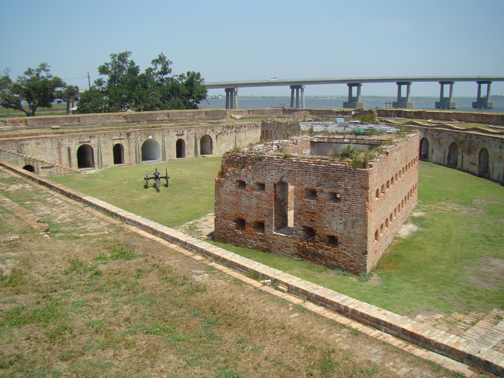
Fort Pike Citadel.

The United States constructed Fort Pike following the War of 1812 to protect passage on the Rigolets. The fort was abandoned in 1890 when it was no longer considered necessary.

== Bridges ==
The Rigolets is spanned by two bridges. The western terminus of the U.S. Route 90 Rigolets Bridge is located immediately north of Fort Pike. It was damaged by Hurricane Katrina in August 2005, and required major repairs. Farther south, CSX Transportation crosses the Rigolets on a 4,555-ft (1,388-meter) railroad bridge. Hurricane damage there from Katrina included shifted spans and the loss of timber decking.
