= List of lighthouses in Georgia (U.S. state) =

This is a list of all lighthouses in the U.S. state of Georgia as identified by the United States Coast Guard. There are three active lights in the state including one maintained as a private aid; four are standing but inactive, and one has been replaced by an automated skeleton tower, and one destroyed by a ship collision. One tower, the second Sapelo Island Light, was moved to Michigan; the first tower on the site is still standing and was relit in 1998.

The earliest lighthouse in the state was erected in 1736; the oldest surviving tower is the Sapelo Island Light, though the present Tybee Island Light, erected in 1867, incorporates the base of its 1773 predecessor. The last lighthouse in the state, the Savannah Light, was constructed in 1964.

The lighthouses on Cumberland Island, Sapelo Island, and St. Simons Island are on the National Register of Historic Places. The Old Harbor Light in Savannah is a contributing property to a National Historic Landmark district.

If not otherwise noted, focal height and coordinates are taken from the United States Coast Guard Light List, while location and dates of activation, automation, and deactivation are taken from the United States Coast Guard Historical information site for lighthouses.

Name	Image	Location	Coordinates	Year first lit	Automated	Year deactivated	Current Lens	Focal Height
Cockspur Island Light		Savannah	32.0227°N 80.8800°W	1849 (First); 1857 (Current)	Never	Active (Inactive: 1909–2007)	Unknown	25 ft (7.6 m) (Original tower)
Little Cumberland Island Light		Cumberland Island	30.97620°N 81.41311°W	1838	Never	1915	None	Unknown
Sapelo Island Light^{A}		Sapelo Island	31.39126°N 81.28568°W	1820^{B}	1998 (Relit)	Active (Inactive: 1905–1998)	Unknown^{C}	Unknown
Sapelo Island Range; Front Light		Sapelo Island	31.38991°N 81.28414°W	1856 (First); 1877 (Current)	Never	1898	None	Unknown
Old Harbor Light (aka: Savannah Harbor Light)		Savannah	32.07931°N 81.08425°W	1858	Always	Active^{D}	Unknown	77 ft (23 m)
Savannah Light		Savannah River	31.1341°N 80.683°W	1964	Always	1996 (Destroyed)	None	85 ft (26 m)
St. Simons Island Light		St. Simons Island	31.13411°N 81.39358°W	1810 (First); 1872 (Current)	1954	Active	Third-order Fresnel lens	104 ft (32 m)
Tybee Island Light		Tybee Island	32.02223°N 80.84566°W	1773 (First); 1867 (Current)	1972	Active	First-order Fresnel	144 ft (44 m)
Tybee Island Range Front Light		Cockspur Island	32.0333°N 80.8985°W	1878	Unknown	Unknown^{E}	None	Unknown

== Notes ==
A. Sapelo Island Light also served as a rear range light from 1856 to 1898.
B. The second Sapelo Island Light was a steel tower built in 1905, it was later re-erected at South Fox Island Light (Michigan) in 1933. The original brick 1820 tower was reactivated in 1998 and still stands today.
C. Sapelo Island Light originally had a Fourth-order Fresnel lens but it has since been replaced by an unknown modern optic.
D. There isn't any evidence that this is still used for navigational purposes. The light remains lit as a decorative piece.
E. Replaced with a skeleton tower at an unknown date.
