= Savannah Light =

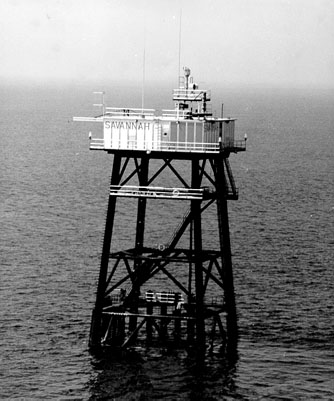
- Savannah Light
- Location: Savannah River, Georgia
- Coordinates: 31°57′03″N 80°40′50″W

Tower
- Constructed: 1922; 104 years ago
- Foundation: 4 Steel pilings
- Construction: Steel
- Automated: Yes
- Shape: Texas tower

Light
- First lit: 1964; 62 years ago
- Deactivated: 1996; 30 years ago No longer in existence
- Lens: DCB 24

Savannah Lighthouse was a lighthouse in Georgia, United States, off the entrance to Savannah River, Georgia. It was the second tower to be demolished after a collision with a foreign-flagged freighter.

== History ==
The Savannah Texas Tower was constructed and placed in operation in 1964, and was built to be an automated light, controlled by the personnel at the Tybee Island Light Station.

In 1996, it became the second Texas Tower to be demolished after a collision with a foreign-flagged freighter, the first instance being the Ambrose Light (a.k.a. the Ambrose Tower). In the case of the Savannah structure, the Singapore container ship Neptune Jade struck the tower in November 1996. The collision sheared off and destroyed the entire structure. A buoy marked the wreckage until a salvage company was contracted to retrieve the wreckage off the ocean floor for scrapping.
