= Chesapeake Light =

Lighthouse in Virginia, United States

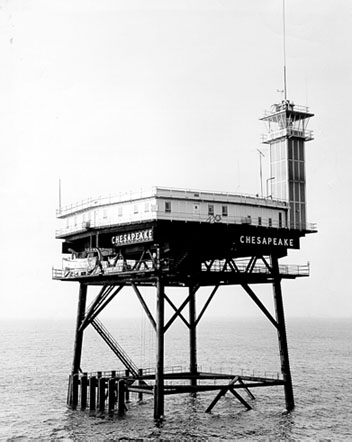
- Undated photograph of Chesapeake Light (USCG)
- Location: 16 mi east of Cape Henry, Virginia
- Coordinates: 36°54′16.7″N 75°42′45.82″W

Tower
- Foundation: Four black piles
- Construction: prefabricated modules
- Automated: 1980
- Height: 120 feet (37 m)
- Shape: White square platform with blue tower at one corner
- Fog signal: HORN: 1 blast ev 10s (1s bl)
- Racon: N (– •)

Light
- First lit: 1965
- Deactivated: 2016
- Focal height: 117 feet (36 m)
- Range: 19 miles (31 km)
- Characteristic: Fl (2)W 15s 0.1s fl 2.9s ec. 0.1s fl 11.9s ec.

Chesapeake Light is an offshore lighthouse marking the entrance to the Chesapeake Bay. The structure was first marked with a lightship in the 1930s, and was later replaced by a "Texas Tower" in 1965. The lighthouse was eventually automated and was used for supporting atmospheric measurement sites for NASA and NOAA. Due to deteriorating structural conditions, the lighthouse was deactivated in 2016. At the time, it was the last remaining "Texas Tower" still in use due to obsolescence.

== History ==
Chesapeake Light was first established in 1930 using a lightship dubbed United States lightship Chesapeake (LV-116). It remained on station (except during World War II) until it was replaced by the present structure in 1965. The current light is also referred to as a "Texas Tower", one of six nearly identical lights on the East Coast which were built at the time. At some point the former lightship was moved to the Inner Harbor in Baltimore, Maryland where it is now on display. The light was automated in 1980, and seventeen years later became a site for NASA to perform meteorological research.

In 2001, NASA sponsored a field mission at the lighthouse called the Chesapeake Lighthouse and Aircraft Measurements for Satellites (CLAMS). The CLAMS field mission involved six aircraft flying over the lighthouse to improve understanding of atmospheric aerosols, to validate and improve the satellite data products, and to test new instruments and measurement concepts.

Chesapeake Light was used in 2002-2003 by University of Maryland, Baltimore County students for research projects. The following year it was inspected by the Coast Guard for possible dismantling, but the inspection showed the light to be sound. By this time, Chesapeake Light was the last remaining "Texas Tower" still in use as Frying Pan Shoals Light was deactivated in 2003. Chesapeake Light continued in service until early July 2016, when it stopped transmitting data. The NDBC lost its access to the tower to service and maintain the equipment after the Coast Guard determined the lighthouse was "structurally unsound". The lighthouse was then auctioned off on August 3, 2016, where it sold for $215,000 (USD) to an anonymous buyer.

== Meteorological measurement site ==
For over a decade, the Chesapeake Light has hosted a suite of meteorological and climate-observing instruments that take measurements for NASA's Clouds and the Earth's Radiant Energy System (CERES) project. The instrument suite, known as CERES Ocean Validation Experiment (COVE), records the direct beam energy from the sun, the sun's energy scattered by the sky, the amount of sunlight scattered by the ocean surface, wind speed, aerosol composition, air temperature, sea surface temperature and more. The measurements validate observations made by the CERES satellite system, which is managed by NASA's Langley Research Center in Hampton, Virginia.

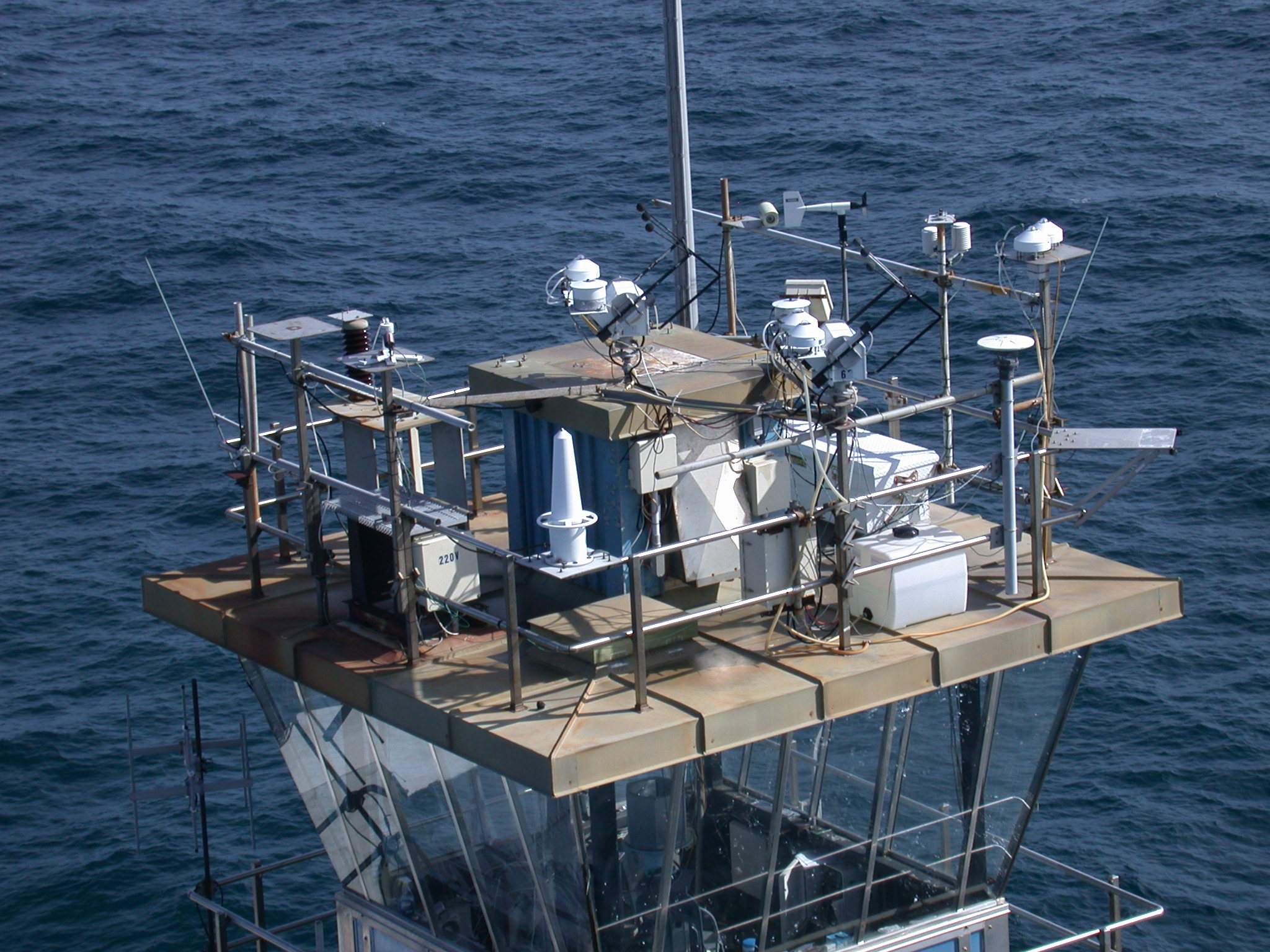
COVE instrumentation, which was used to measure incident solar energy, atop the Chesapeake Light. (Credit: NASA)

The collection of CERES instruments, which are mounted on several space-based satellites, has been operating for more than a decade, creating a long-term record of the key driver of Earth's climate – the balance of incoming and outgoing solar radiation known as the "energy budget."

The COVE instruments at the Chesapeake Light Station are uniquely located over an all ocean environment, and serve to validate the observations the CERES satellites make over the oceans. Validations over the ocean are important because three quarters of the Earth's surface is water.

The COVE instrumentation is also part of an international network of satellite ground truth sites known as the Baseline Surface Radiation Network (BSRN).

Other meteorological and atmospheric instrumentation located at Chesapeake Light Station include the AErosol RObotic NETwork (AERONET), which is a ground-based, worldwide network that measures atmospheric aerosols. Chesapeake Light also hosts the Micro Pulse Lidar Network, which measures aerosol and cloud vertical structure, and NOAA's Ground-Based Global Positioning System Meteorology Network (GPS-MET) which measures atmospheric column water vapor.
