= List of lighthouses in Georgia =

List of lighthouses in Georgia may refer to:

- List of lighthouses in Georgia (country)
- List of lighthouses in Georgia (U.S. state)
