= Tybee Island Range Front Light =

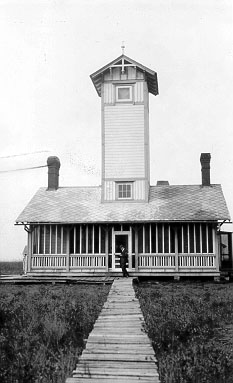
- Tybee Cut Front Range Light
- Location: Tybee Island, Georgia
- Coordinates: 32°01′55″N 80°54′18″W

Tower
- Constructed: 1878
- Construction: Wooden house with tower
- Height: 24 feet (7.3 m)
- Markings: Lantern on white dwelling

Light
- First lit: 1878
- Lens: Sixth-order Fresnel lens
- Characteristic: Fixed white

Tybee Island Range Front Lighthouse, also known as Tybee (Knoll) Cut Range Front Lighthouse, was a lighthouse in Georgia, United States, at the mouth of the Savannah River, near Tybee Island, Georgia.

This lighthouse should not be confused with more well-known Tybee Island Light Station.

== History ==
Tybee Island Range Front Lighthouse was built in 1878 and had a sixth-order Fresnel lens.

== See also ==
- Tybee Island Light Station
