= Sapelo Island National Estuarine Research Reserve =

Estuary in Georgia, United States

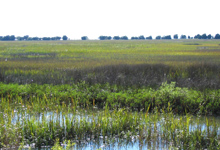
- Marsh in the reserve

- Location within Georgia Location within the United States
- Interactive map of Sapelo Island National Estuarine Research Reserve
- Location: Sapelo Island, Georgia, United States
- Coordinates: 31°27′06″N 81°17′17″W
- Area: 6,110 acres (2,470 ha)
- Established: 1976
- Website: nerrs.noaa.gov/Reserve.aspx?ResID=SAP

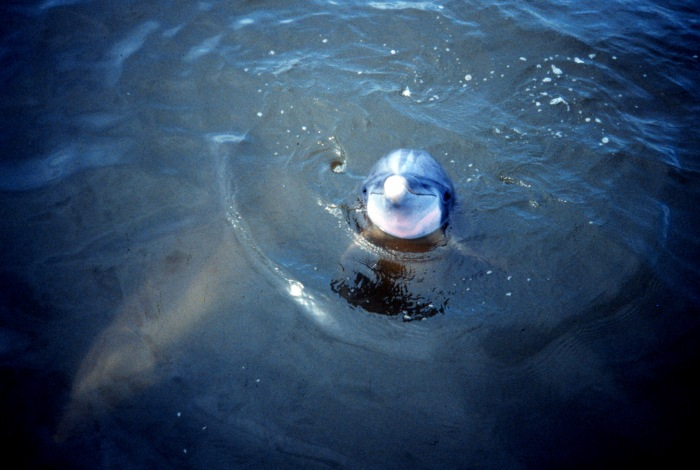
Bottlenose dolphins

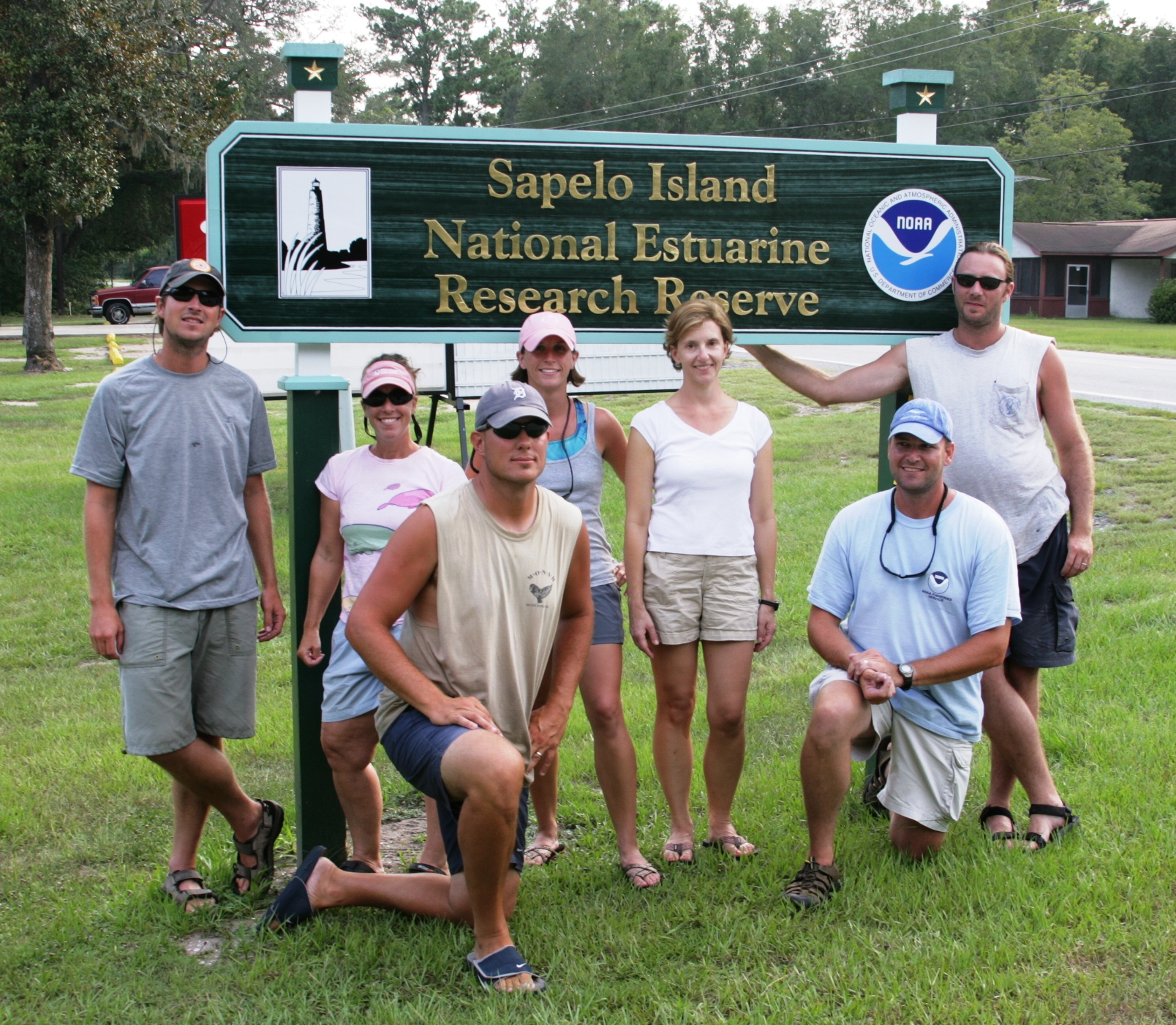
Dolphin researchers at the reserve

The Sapelo Island National Estuarine Research Reserve is a 6,110-acre (2,470 ha) coastal plain estuary, located in the U.S. State of Georgia, protected on its seaward side by a Pleistocene barrier island. It was established in 1976.

Sapelo Island is the fourth largest Georgia barrier island and one of the most pristine. The reserve is made up of salt marshes, maritime forests and beach dune areas. Not only is the island rich in natural history, but also in human history dating back 4,000 years.
