= Sapelo Island dock collapse =

2024 fatal boat dock collapse in coastal Georgia

- Date: October 19, 2024
- Time: ~3:50 p.m. (GMT-4)
- Location: Sapelo Island, Georgia, United States; 31.41803°N 81.29623°W
- Type: Dock collapse causing drowning
- Cause: Overcrowding
- Deaths: 7
- Injuries: 8

On October 19, 2024, a ferry dock located at Sapelo Island in the U.S. state of Georgia collapsed, resulting in the deaths of seven people.

== Collapse ==
On October 19, 2024, a ferry dock gangway located at Sapelo Island along the coast of Georgia, collapsed into the water, causing crowds of 20 people on the dock to fall into the water. The crowds of at least 40 people had come together to celebrate 2024 Cultural Day, commemorating Sapelo Island's Gullah-Geechee community made up of descendants of Black slaves.

Seven people were killed in the collapse, with eight more reported injured, including six critically.

== Recovery ==
Personnel from the Georgia Department of Natural Resources, the United States Coast Guard, and the McIntosh County Fire Department began search operations to find survivors who were still in the water. Several recovered victims were taken to regional hospitals.

== Victims ==
The victims were identified as:

| # | Name (s) and Surname (s) | Age (s) |
|---|---|---|
| 1 | Isaiah Thomas | 79 |
| 2 | Carlotta Mcintosh | 93 |
| 3 | Jacqueline Crews Carter | 75 |
| 4 | Cynthia Alynn Gibbs | 74 |
| 5 | Queen Welch | 76 |
| 6 | William Lee Johnson Jr. | 73 |
| 7 | Charles League Houston | 77 |

All victims were elderly people, with the youngest victim being 73.

== Aftermath ==
After the collapse, signs were put up at the entrance of the gangway limiting the amount of people at one time to eight.

== Reactions ==
President of the United States Joe Biden and First Lady of the United States Jill Biden were "heartbroken" and said in a statement “What should have been a joyous celebration of Gullah-Geechee culture and history instead turned into tragedy and devastation. Jill and I mourn those who lost their lives, and we pray for the injured and anyone still missing,"

Georgia governor Brian Kemp and his wife Marty Kemp said they were also "heartbroken" saying in an X post "Marty, the girls, and I are heartbroken by today’s tragedy on Sapelo Island. As state and local first responders continue to work this active scene, we ask that all Georgians join us in praying for those lost, for those still in harm’s way, and for their families,"
