= Texas Tower (lighthouse) =

Series of offshore lighthouses around the United States

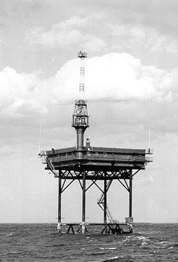
Buzzard's Bay Entrance Light in Buzzards Bay, Massachusetts, a Texas Tower.

A Texas Tower lighthouse is a structure which is similar to an off-shore oil platform. Seven of these structures were built in the 1960s off the shores of the United States. Automation started in the late 1970s, which led to the obsolescence of the housing built for the keepers which resulted in such a large structure. Three of the towers were dismantled over time due to deteriorating structural conditions among other problems, while another one was destroyed in a ship collision. The last Texas Tower was deactivated in 2016 having served for over half a century. Today only three of the former lights remain.

== Design and construction ==
These lights were all constructed at offshore stations previously served by lightships. An attempt to set a caisson light at Diamond Shoals off the North Carolina coast in the late 1880s showed that the techniques of the day were not adequate, and it was not until the 1960s that the Coast Guard attempted to replace the lightships with permanent structures. By that point, experience with offshore oil drilling platforms provided a model.

The six lights were similar in form and, excepting the first, nearly identical in construction. Each consisted of a framework of four steel, concrete-filled piles driven deep into the ocean floor, upon which a square platform was set. This platform contained the living quarters and was assembled from a set of modules. A tower was attached to one corner and housed the light. The roof of the living quarters formed a helipad; a dock was also provided low on the framework. The name of the station was displayed on a large sign on each side of the light, on the side of or just below the platform.

The quarters provided living space for six regular crewmen plus three transients. Normally, four crewmembers were on duty at a time, with regular rotation to shore. In addition to monitoring and maintaining the beacon, the crew also operated weather reporting equipment.

== Automation and decommissioning ==
While these towers have stood against any storms thus far, two of them have fallen victim to ship collisions. In 1996, Ambrose Light was struck by a Greek oil tanker, damaging it severely enough that it was replaced in 1999 by a new, smaller tower (which itself was struck twice before being demolished by the Coast Guard in 2008). A month after the Ambrose accident, Savannah Light was completely demolished when a container ship struck it.

By that time all of these stations had been automated, beginning with the Diamond Shoals Light in 1977. Inspection of the (then) survivors revealed that four out of five showed substantial deterioration. Brenton Reef Light was demolished in 1992 and replaced with a buoy. The Buzzard Bay Light was demolished and replaced with a smaller tower in 1996; the Diamond Shoals and Frying Pan Shoals lights have been extinguished; both towers still stand and are now privately owned. Chesapeake Light was retrofitted with solar panels and was the last tower to be an active navigational aid. In August, 2016 the light was deactivated by NOAA after it was determined that the structure was deteriorating. The design of the Texas tower is now considered obsolete since there is no longer a need for a structure to house the keepers.

== Towers built ==
The first Texas tower in the United States was the Buzzards Bay Light, located in Buzzards Bay, Massachusetts, which was commissioned on November 1, 1961. In total seven Texas tower lights were constructed over a period of six years. Chesapeake Light was the last to be deactivated in 2016 after it was used for NOAA and NASA to carry out studies.

Name	Image	Location	Year first lit	Automated	Year deactivated
Ambrose Light		New York	1967	1988	1999 (Dismantled)
Brenton Reef Light		Rhode Island	1962	Always	1989 (Dismantled in 1992)
Buzzards Bay Entrance Light		Massachusetts	1961	1980	1996 (Dismantled)
Chesapeake Light		Virginia	1965	1980	2016
Diamond Shoal Light		North Carolina	1966	1977	2001
Frying Pan Shoals Light		North Carolina	1964	1979	2003
Savannah Light		Georgia	1964	Always	1996 (Destroyed)
