= University of Georgia Marine Institute =

Research station on the coast of the US state of Georgia

Coordinates: 31.39737°N 81.28000°W

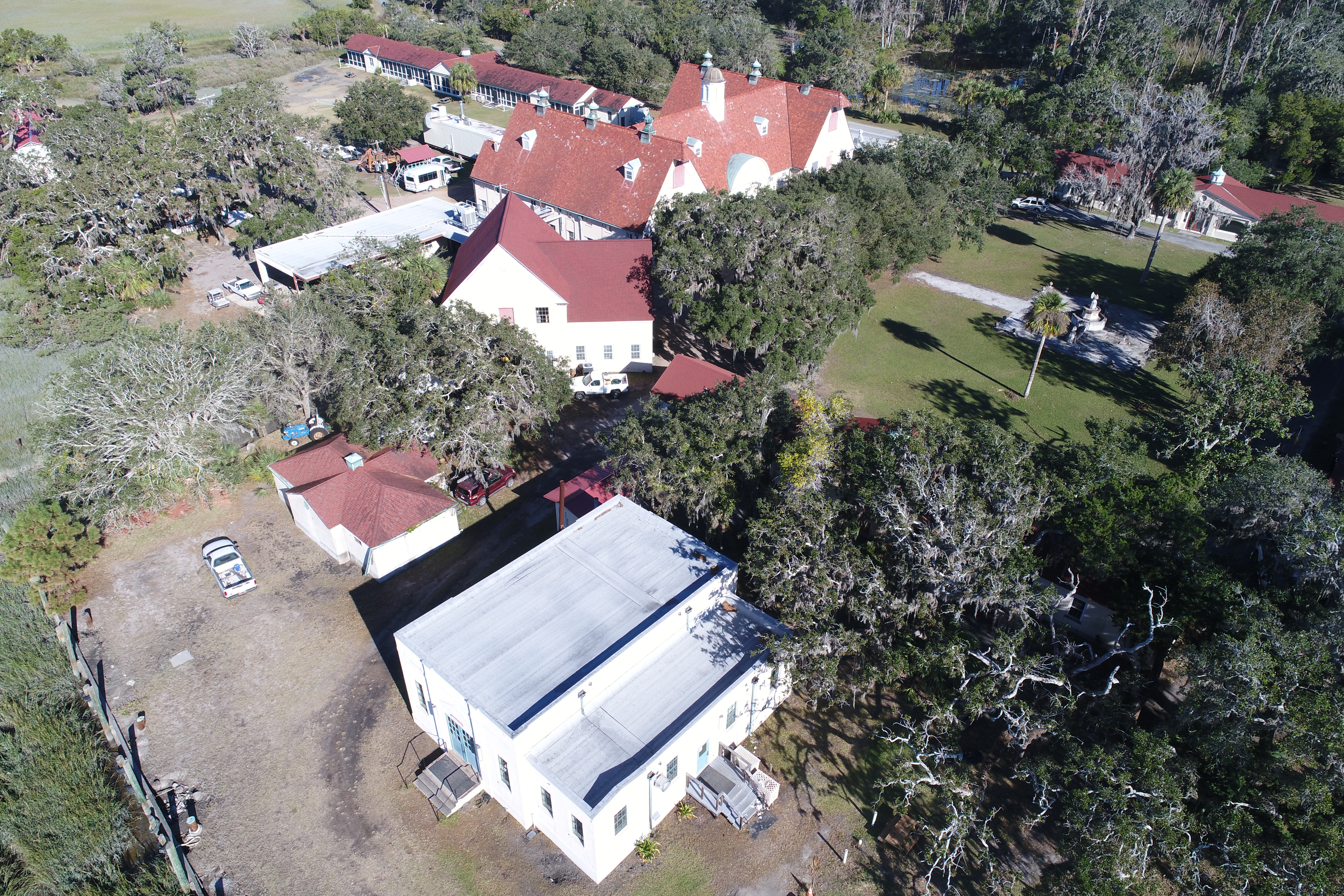
UGAMI campus

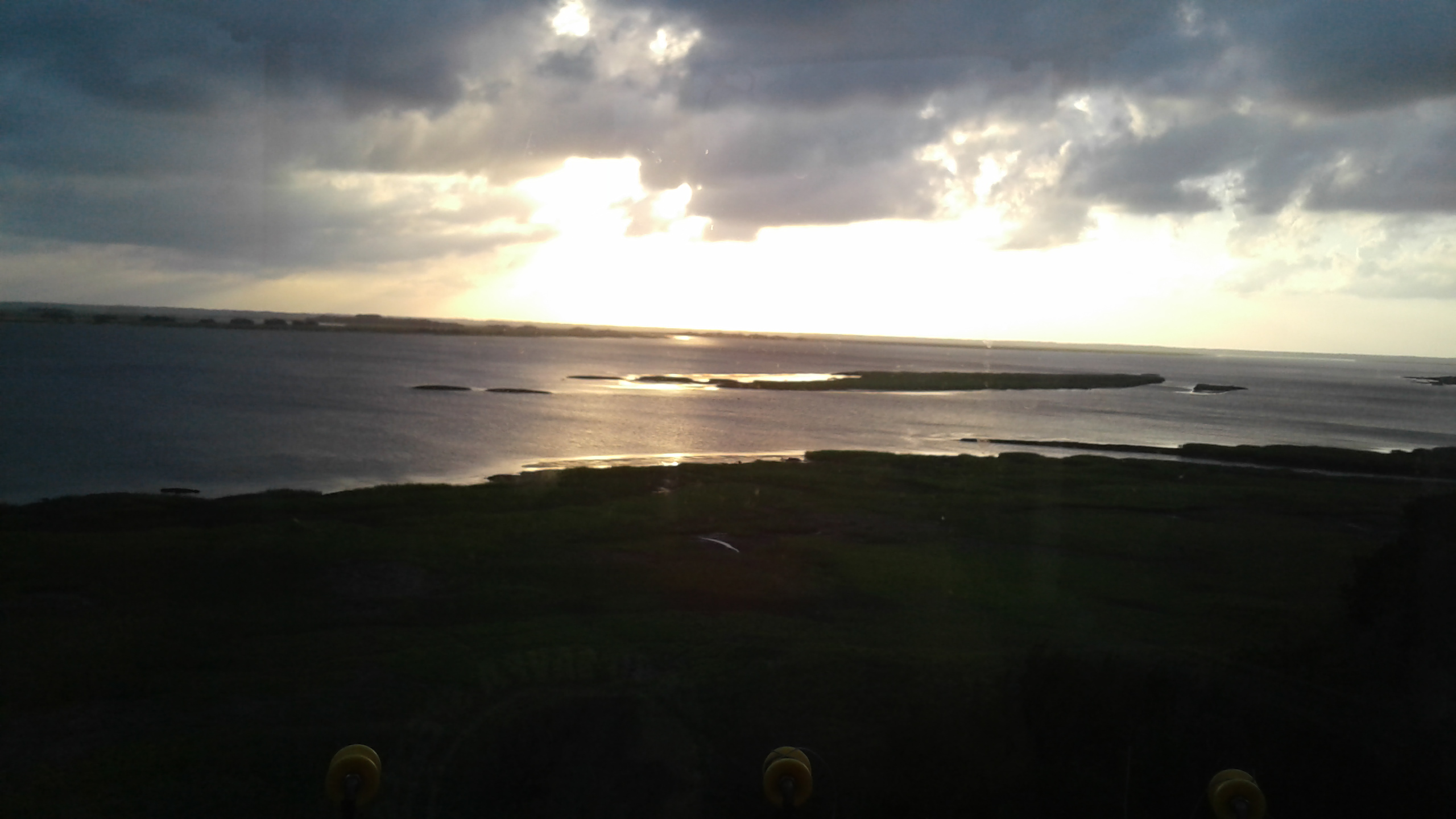
Doboy Sound from atop the Sapelo Island Lighthouse, near the University of Georgia Marine Institute

The University of Georgia Marine Institute (UGAMI) is a nearshore ecological and geological research station located on Sapelo Island off the coast of Georgia in the United States. This island lies between the Atlantic Ocean and a pristine salt marsh. A ferry takes passengers from Meridian (between Darien and Crescent) to Sapelo Island. The Island has fewer than 100 full-time residents. The Institute was created in 1953 and is currently a unit of the University of Georgia's Office of Research. The Institute is 280 miles southeast of the University of Georgia's main campus in Athens. UGAMI is world-renowned for its research on coastal marine and estuarine ecosystems.

== Education ==
UGAMI offers experiences for undergraduate and graduate students. Approximately 600-700 university students train there each year. Students experience complete immersion in field-based academic studies, close mentorship by faculty who are experts in their fields of study, and engagement in a supportive community of scholars.

UGAMI does not have any stand-alone degree programs. However, it provides many training and research opportunities. UGAMI offers undergraduate classes, provides research experiences for graduate and undergraduate students, and is a field trip destination for university classes from all over the country. Classes visiting UGAMI on field trips usually stay for two to five days, but some stay longer. UGA offers full-credit courses that take place entirely at the Marine Institute. As many of these classes take place during the summer, they attract students from many colleges and universities. Undergraduates in UGAMI's residential courses live and work alongside the institute's faculty and graduate student researchers, while taking courses in topics such as marine sciences, ecology, and coastal geography. Graduate students from many different institutions conduct thesis research at UGAMI for periods ranging from a few days to a few years.

== Research ==
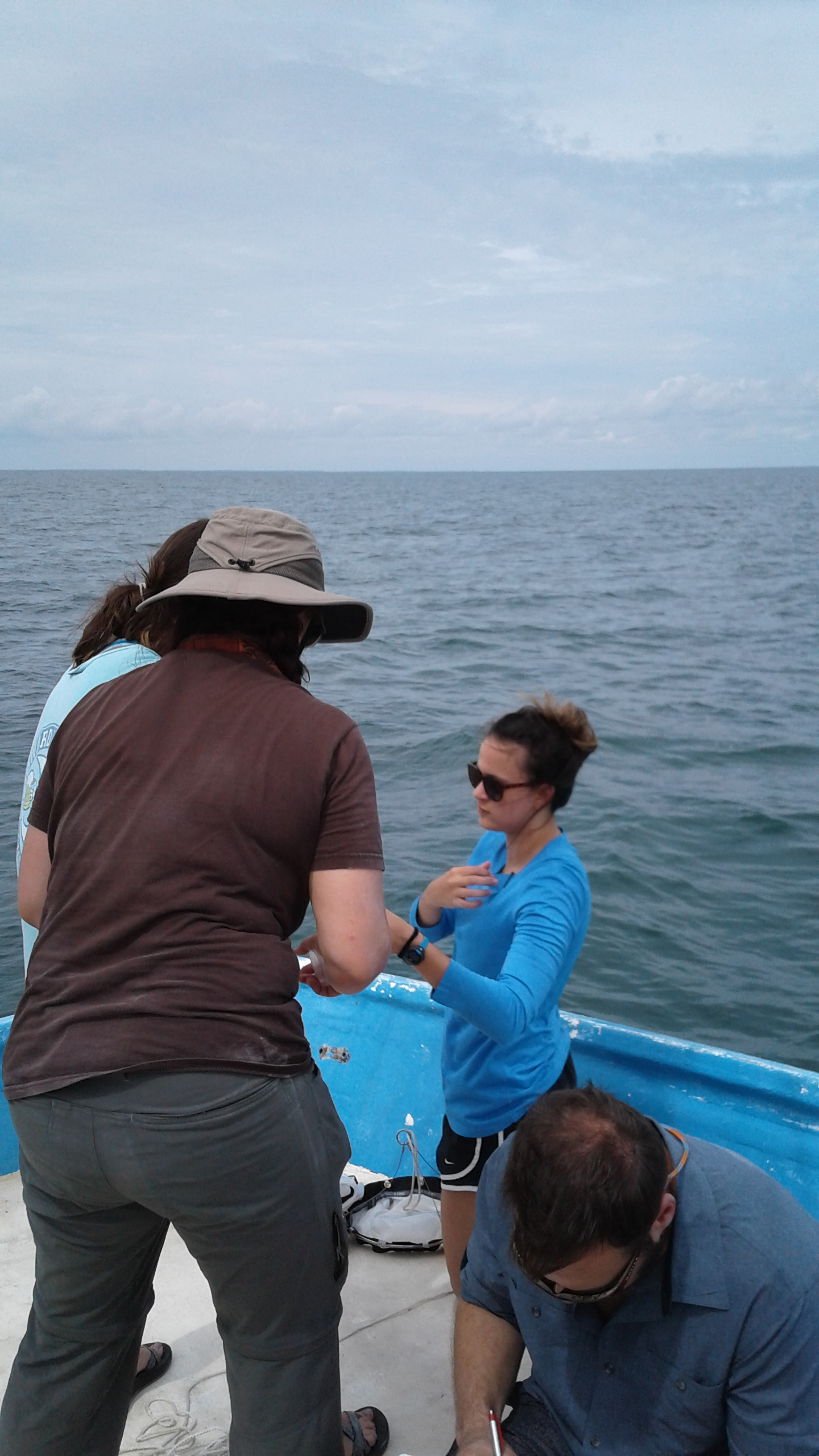
Students and faculty making physical and biological measurements aboard the University of Georgia Marine Institute's research vessel, Spartina

The field of saltmarsh ecology, and many of the foundational concepts in ecosystem ecology, were created at UGAMI by scientists such as Eugene Odum and John Teal. Today, UGAMI is still at the forefront of coastal and estuarine research.

The flagship research project at UGAMI is the Georgia Coastal Ecosystems-Long-Term Ecological Research Program (GCE LTER). The GCE LTER is part of the National Science Foundation's Long Term Ecological Research Network, which consists of 28 research sites around North America and Antarctica. The GCE LTER was established by the National Science Foundation in 2000, and is the largest ecological research project on the Southeast Coast. The Georgia coast will experience many changes in the coming decades because of sea level rise, climate change, and human modification. GCE LTER is studying the estuary ecosystem to learn how it responds to these perturbations, and to better predict future changes to the coast.

UGAMI is used for both long-term and short-term research projects, conducted by scientists from many institutions. The field research conducted at UGAMI results in the publication of approximately 50 peer-reviewed scientific papers each year.

Long-term researchers generally maintain semi-permanent housing, offices, and laboratories, and have students and technicians stationed at the Marine Institute for months at a time. Short-term researchers generally stay in the Marine Institute's apartments and dormitory, and use the visitor labs. Although most of the visiting scientists come from the U.S., UGAMI also hosts international researchers.

The greatest assets that UGAMI offers visiting scientists are:

- Access – UGAMI offers access to protected barrier island habitats, including some of the most expansive and relatively undisturbed salt marshes along the U.S. eastern seaboard.
- Data – Researchers can build on long-term monitoring data, together with the results from numerous directed studies.
- Community – UGAMI serves as a focal point that fosters connections among scholars from multiple institutions and fields of study.
