= Brenton Reef Light =

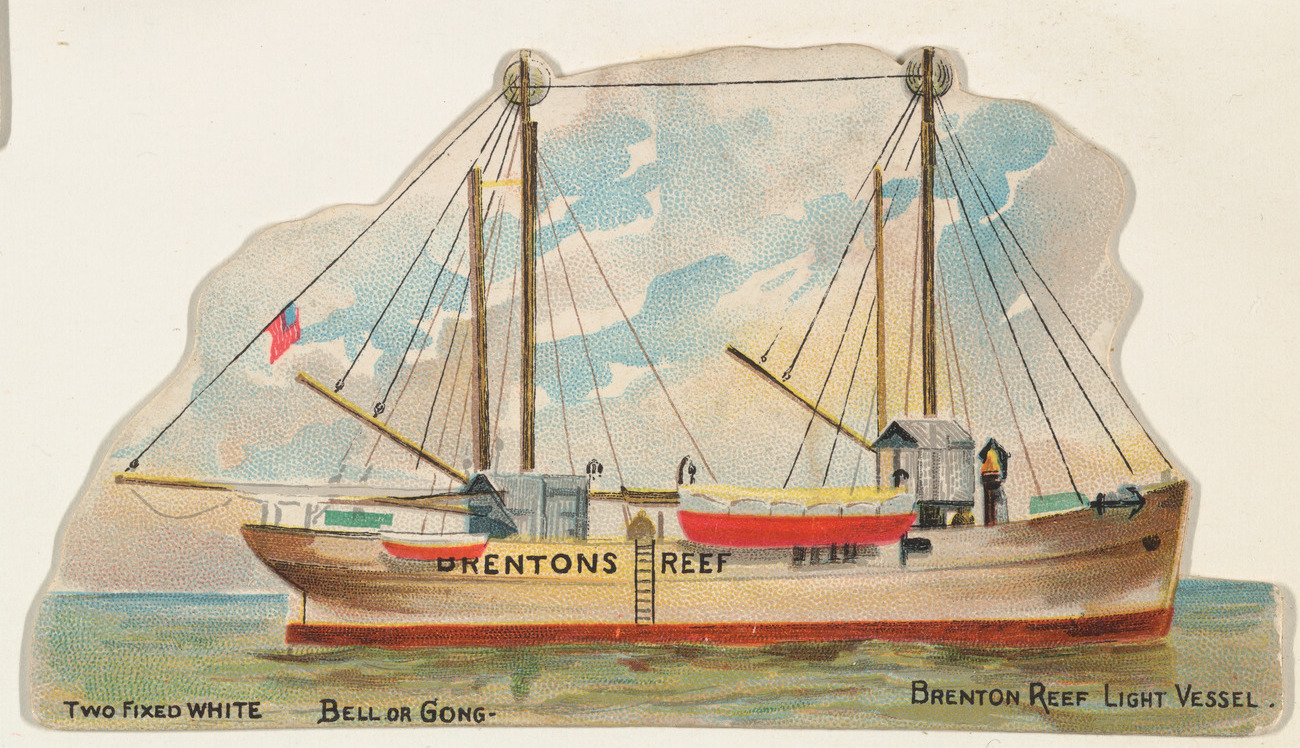
- Location: Washington County, United States
- Coordinates: 41°25′35″N 71°23′22″W

Tower
- Foundation: steel tower
- Height: 87 ft (27 m)
- Shape: square platform with tower at one corner

Light
- First lit: 1962
- Deactivated: 1989
- Lens: Crouse Hinds DCE-36 airways beacon
- Range: 22 nmi (41 km; 25 mi)
- Characteristic: Fl(2) W 10s

The Brenton Reef Light was a Texas tower lighthouse at the entrance to Narragansett Bay, Rhode Island, United States, south of Beavertail Point. Erected to replace a lightship in 1962, it was decommissioned in 1989 due to its deteriorating condition.

== History ==
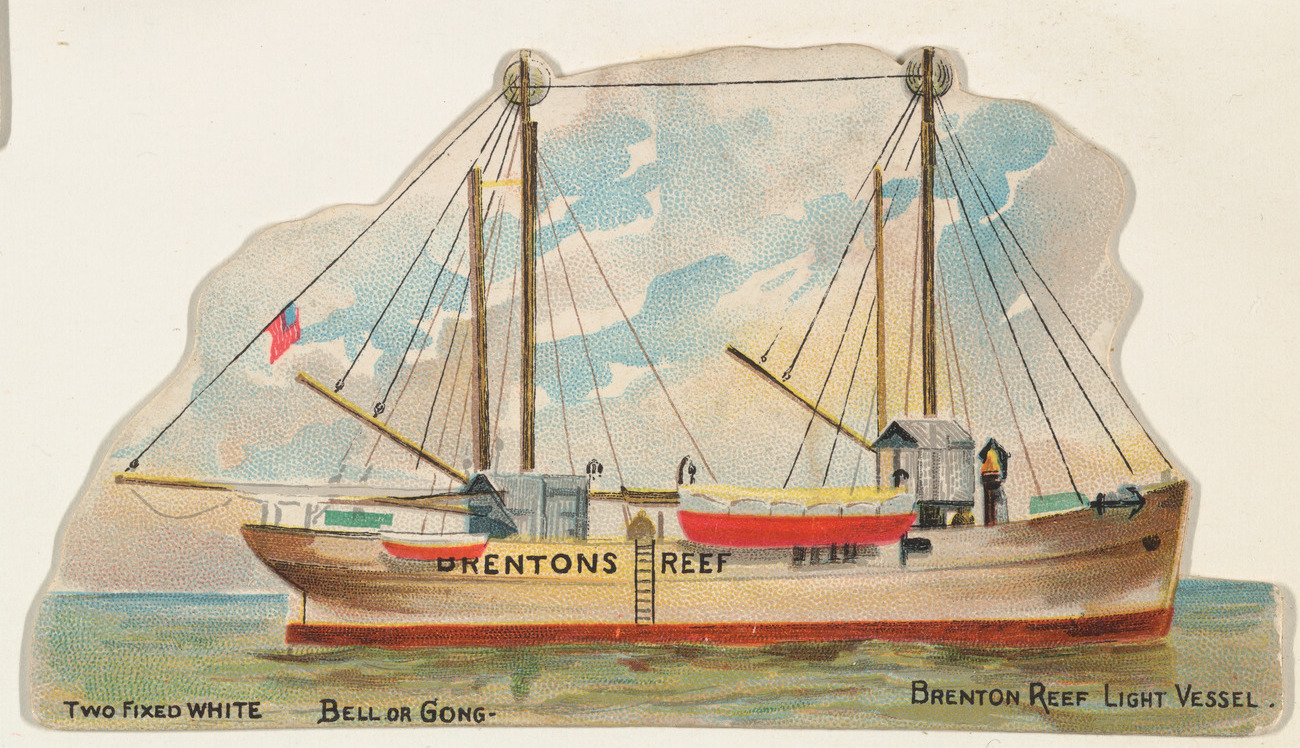
Brenton Reef Light Vessel, circa 1889

This offshore station was marked by a succession of lightships beginning in 1853, with new vessels being assigned to the station in 1856, 1897, and 1935. In the early 1960s the United States Coast Guard initiated a program to replace these lightships with large steel towers, commonly known as Texas towers. Brenton Reef was selected for such replacement, but a somewhat smaller facility was constructed instead. This light was originally a manned station, with living quarters and galley, as well as engine room to supply power to the light and living quarters. It was connected to the Beavertail Light by submarine cables and maintained by Coast Guardsmen out of the Newport, Rhode Island station, and was converted to fully automatic operation during its active lifetime. At its activation in 1962, it became the second such light tower on the east coast.

These towers deteriorated relatively quickly, and in 1983 the Coast Guard first suggested decommissioning it. It was retained, however, due to the proximity of the America's Cup races. In 1989 the Coast Guard announced that the light was to be removed, and in 1992 it was dismantled. The following year the pieces were sunk off Long Island as part of an artificial reef. A lighted buoy replaced the tower at a position somewhat further south, where it remains at present.

== Keepers ==
=== Lightship LV-14 (1853–1856) ===
Keeper	Years
David C. Champlin	1853
John Heath	1853–1854
Edward E. Taylor	1854
Samuel Dunn	1854
Josiah K. Pitman	1854–1861

=== Lightship LV-11 (1856–1897) ===
Keeper	Years
Josiah K. Pitman	1854–1861
Joseph Sherman	1861–1865
George Bardick	1865
Charles D. Marsh	1865–1866
George Williams	1866–1868
Clarke Bardick	1868–1871
Charles D. Marsh	1871–1886
David H. Caulkins	1886–1888
Edward Fogarty	1888–1898

=== Lightship LV-39 (1897–1935) ===
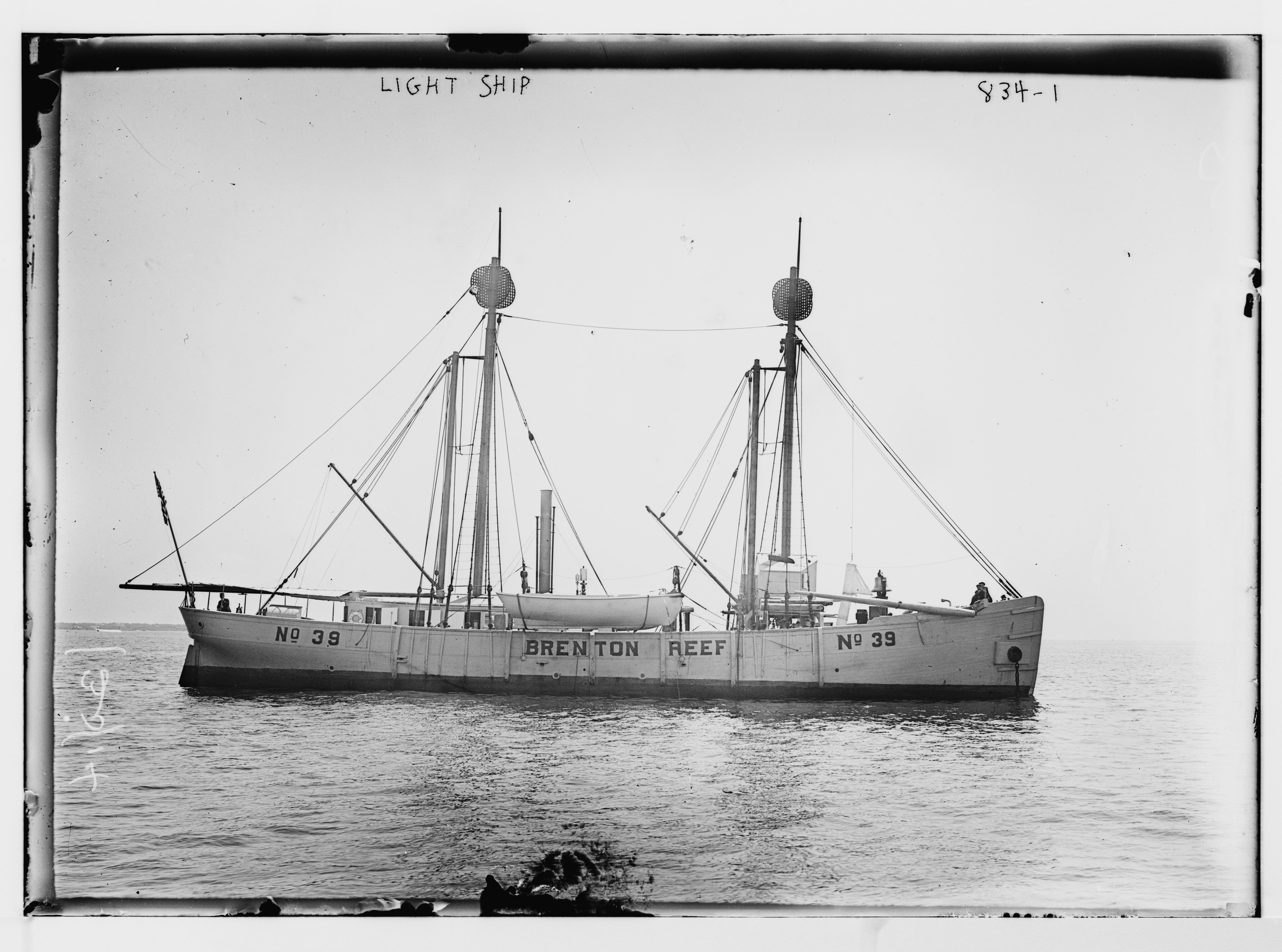
LV-39

Keeper	Years
Edward Fogarty	1888–1898
Charles A. Hawkins	1898–1917
Karl M. Larsen	1917–1919
Fred J. Worth	1919
Martin Berg	1919–1922
Harold White	1922–1923
Theodor Anderson	1923–1927
Charles Steijen	1927
Theodor Anderson	1927
John B. Kelly	1927
Frederic Sundloff	1927–1929
August E. Gustafson	1929-?
Unknown	1929–1939

=== Lightship LV-102/WAL 525 (1945–1962) ===
Keeper	Years
Unknown	1929–1939
Norman Gray, Master	1939–?
Unknown	?–1961
Edward Godlewski	1961–1963

=== Lighthouse (1962–1989) ===
Keeper	Years
Edward Godlewski	1961–1963
Unknown	1963–1989
