= Buzzards Bay Entrance Light =

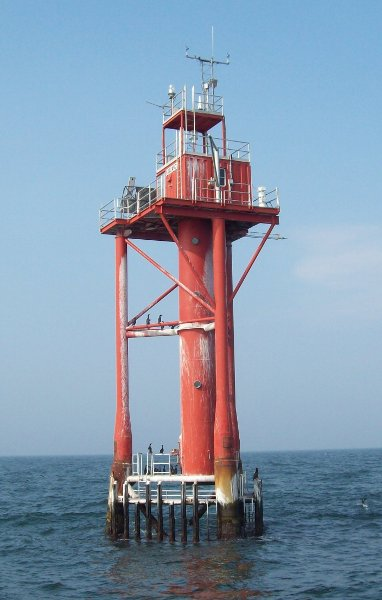
- Current (1997) Structure
- Location: Buzzards Bay, Massachusetts
- Coordinates: 41°23′49.2″N 71°2′4.9″W

Tower
- Constructed: 1847 (lightships); 1961 (Texas Tower); 1997 (current structure)
- Foundation: Steel piles filled with concrete
- Construction: Steel
- Automated: 1980
- Shape: Tower, on red square on 3 piles with large tube in center
- Markings: Red, with "BUZZARDS"
- Fog signal: HORN: 2 every 30s
- Racon: "B" (Bravo)

Light
- First lit: 1961
- Focal height: 67 feet (20 m)
- Range: 14 nautical miles (26 km; 16 mi)
- Characteristic: Fl W 2.5s

Buzzards Bay Entrance Light is a lighthouse located in open water at the entrance to Buzzards Bay, about four nautical miles west southwest of Cuttyhunk Island, Massachusetts. The light has a racon showing the letter "B".

In 1996 the present structure replaced a Texas Tower built in 1961, which in turn had replaced the lightships Hens & Chickens (LV-5) and Vineyard Sound (LV-10). Since it sits in water 50 ft (15m) deep, a conventional lighthouse would have been difficult, forcing the choice of structure.

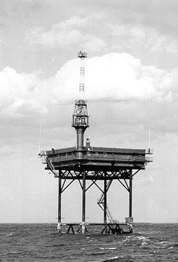
1961 Texas Tower
