= Sapelo Island Range Front Light =

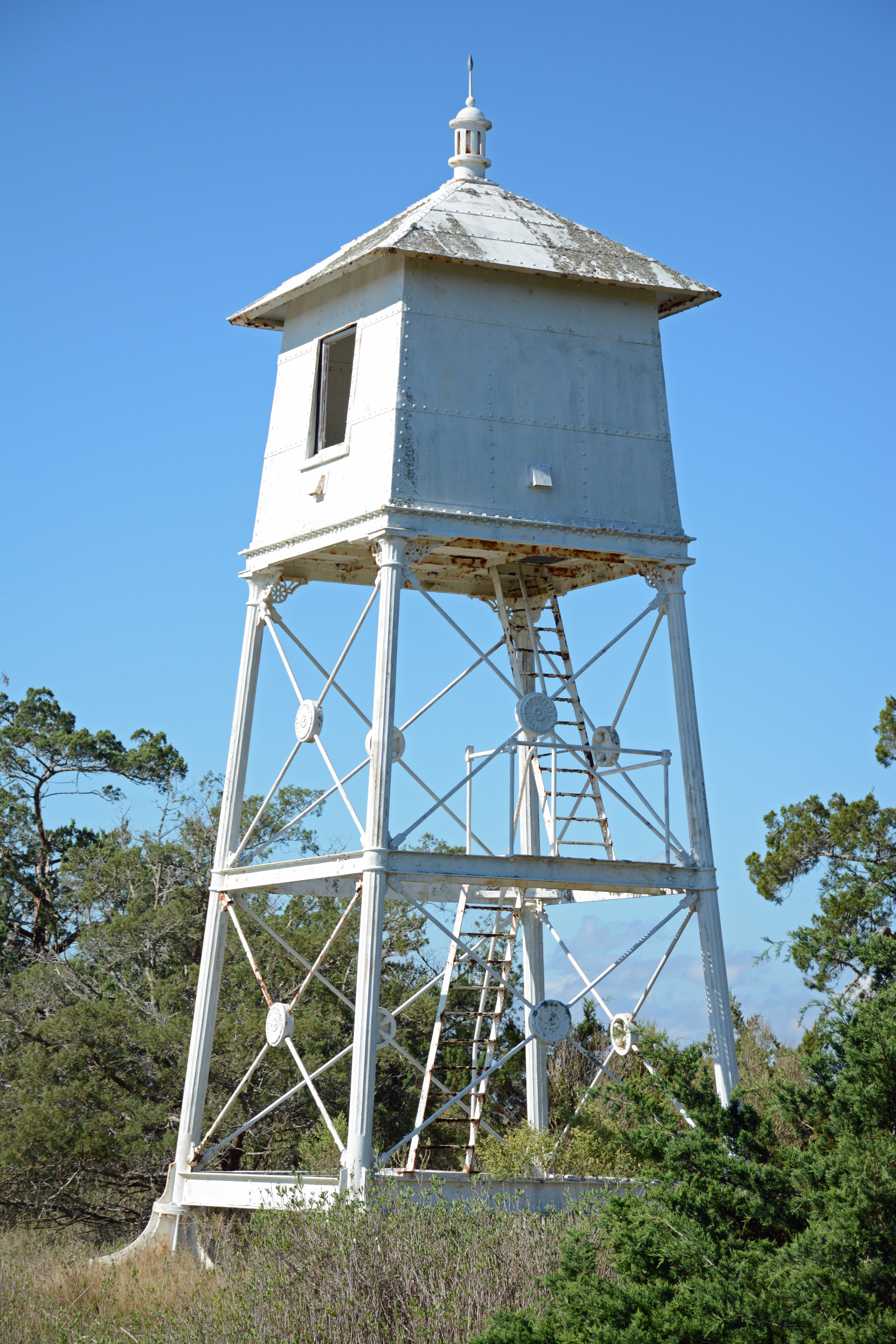
- Location: Sapelo Island, Georgia
- Coordinates: 31.38991°N 81.28414°W

Tower
- Constructed: range established 1868
- Construction: cast iron
- Height: 25 feet (7.6 m)
- Shape: square pyramidal skeletal tower
- Markings: painted white
- Heritage: National Register of Historic Places contributing property

Light
- First lit: 1877
- Deactivated: 1898
- Sapelo Island Range Light
- U.S. National Register of Historic Places
- U.S. Historic district – Contributing property
- Location: S end of Sapelo Island, S of University of Georgia Marine Institute, Sapelo Island, Georgia
- Area: 205.9 acres (83.3 ha)
- Built: 1877
- NRHP reference No.: 97000335
- Added to NRHP: August 26, 1997

The Sapelo Island Range Front Light (or Sapelo Island Range Beacon) is a lighthouse range light on Sapelo Island, Georgia, U.S. It is near the Sapelo Island Light and is a contributor to its 1997 National Register of Historic Places nomination.

== History ==
In 1855 a wooden beacon light was built near the main lighthouse. It was damaged or destroyed during the American Civil War and replaced in 1868. That structure fell into disrepair and was replaced with the current iron structure in 1877. It was used until 1899, after which it was dismantled. It was reassembled and used by the U.S. Coast Guard in World War II to look for submarines. It was restored in 1997 by the Georgia Department of Natural Resources, which manages most of Sapelo Island. It is thought to be the oldest surviving iron structure in Georgia.
