= Frying Pan Shoals Light =

Lighthouse in North Carolina, US

Frying Pan Shoals Light Station
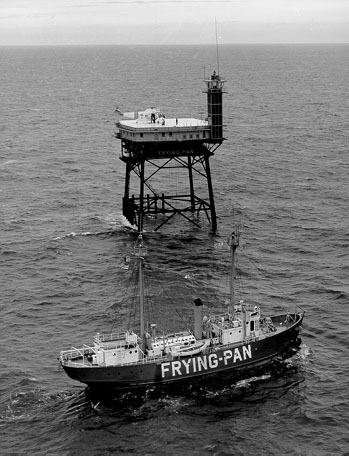
- Frying Pan Lightship and Light Tower
- Location: Near North Carolina
- Coordinates: 33°29.107′N 77°35.394′W

Tower
- Constructed: 1964-66
- Foundation: Steel
- Automated: 1979
- Height: 80 ft (24 m)
- Fog signal: Fog horn

Light
- First lit: 1964
- Deactivated: 2003

Frying Pan Shoals Light Station is a decommissioned Coast Guard lighthouse located near the end of the Frying Pan Shoals 32 miles (51 km) SE of Bald Head Island, North Carolina. The Frying Pan Shoals Light Station rises 135' above the Atlantic Ocean. It has been privately owned since 2010 after it was purchased from a government auction. Identity of the owner(s) has not been disclosed. The nonprofit FPTower Inc. received a donation of shares in July 2025 and entered into an agreement in July 2026, ending the nonprofit's access to, and any responsibility for the structure's restoration.

The facility is 95% powered by stored solar energy with fossil fuel generation reserved for heavy power usages such as welding. The nearly 6000 square foot helipad captures rainwater into one of the remaining 14,500 U.S. gallons (55,000 liters) steel holding tanks attached under the belly where an ultraviolet (UV) and micro filtration system along with a commercial reverse osmosis system results in potable water suitable for cooking and general use. High-speed Internet communications were established by installing a radio 5.8 GHz microwave connection between two 4 ft (1.2 m) dishes, one at 1,340 ft (410 m) on a land based TV tower and the other located on the tower's helipad.

The light tower is modeled after a steel oil drilling platform, known as a "Texas Tower", on top of four steel legs that was engineered to be used as a lighthouse housing several Coast Guard members. Each of the four 42 in (1.1 m) legs are buried 226' deep into the soil below and were filled with cement. The 80-foot (24 m) main level, and the 135 ft (41 m) SE corner light tower marks the shoals at the confluence of the Cape Fear River and the Atlantic Ocean.

== History ==
The shoals have been patrolled by a lightboat since 1854 by the United States Coast Guard. In 1964, the light tower was built, and was staffed year-round by a four-person crew until the operation of the light was automated in 1979. The station was ultimately decommissioned in 2004, owing to the advent of GPS systems on ships making the facility obsolete.

The Coast Guard considered demolishing the light for use as an artificial reef, but instead held an online auction where the winning bid was by a South Carolina diving and research firm Shipwrecks, Inc. in 2009 for $515,000. However, the company failed to make the down payment, and subsequently the tower returned to government hands and was sold again in August 2010 for $85,000 to a private individual,

In August 2011, the Frying Pan Light Station was directly hit by Hurricane Irene with measured winds of 67 mph (108 km/h) and waves of 28 ft (8.5 m). An observational flight the day after the storm, August 28, 2011, showed that the tower had no visible damage from the impact.

In November 2012, Hurricane Sandy went within a few dozen miles of the Frying Pan Light Station but due to its being a low-category storm at the time, the only issue was a few disturbed ceiling tiles due to a window being left open.

In September 2018, the Shoals were in the path of Hurricane Florence. Media coverage in the hours before the storms landfall noted the American flag on Frying Pan Light Station being torn to shreds by the extreme conditions as the hurricane approached. This could be seen live from an Explore.org camera on the tower. Coverage of the flag was widely viewed online, and the flag was eventually given the name Kevin by livestream viewers. After the storm passed, the flag was recovered and sold at an auction to raise money for the Wilmington Red Cross. In 2019, it went through Hurricane Dorian. As the eye passed over the structure, a weather station on the tower reported a pressure of 959.5 mb.

== Structural conditions ==
The light tower is accessible by helicopter and by boat. A January 2010 onsite inspection by an engineering firm that was contracted by the Coast Guard determined that the helipad platform can indeed support a helicopter and that the entire structure, while in need of repair, was structurally sound. The lower stairs to the light tower were destroyed by a hurricane and the mid to upper section stairs have experienced significant deterioration due to the salt environment.

The platform on the tower consists of two floors. The subfloor is a living area of approximately 5,000 square feet (460 m^{2}) that includes seven bedrooms, kitchen, office, storage area, recreation area and toilet facilities.

== Trivia ==
The light tower is located in Maidenhead grid square FM13, which is mostly ocean along with some coastal areas of North Carolina and sparsely populated. Grid-square hunting amateur radio operators often seek out subjects such as this for opportunities to log a conversation.
