= Ambrose Light =

Former light tower in Lower New York Bay

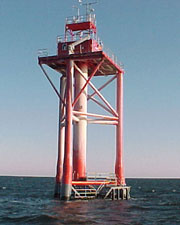
- Ambrose light station, rebuilt in 1999. This light station was dismantled in 2008.
- Location: Lower New York Bay; Ambrose Channel
- Coordinates: 40°27′00″N 73°48′00″W

Tower
- Foundation: Steel piles
- Construction: Steel
- Automated: 1988
- Height: 76 feet (23 m)
- Shape: Tower on red square worded AMBROSE
- Fog signal: Horn 2 every 15s
- Racon: "N" (−∘)

Light
- First lit: 1823 (Ambrose Lightship); 1967 (Texas Tower); 1999 (New Tower)
- Deactivated: 1999 (Texas Tower); 2008 (New Tower)
- Focal height: 23 m (75 ft)
- Intensity: 60,000 candles
- Range: 18 nmi (33 km)
- Characteristic: Flashing White 5 seconds

Ambrose Light, often called Ambrose Tower, was the light station at the convergence of several major shipping lanes in Lower New York Bay, including Ambrose Channel, the primary passage for ships entering and departing the Port of New York and New Jersey.

The tower, which was owned and maintained by the United States Coast Guard, was located at 40.46°N 73.83°W.

On July 25, 2008, the Coast Guard announced that Ambrose Light, which was severely damaged when a tanker struck it on November 3, 2007, would be dismantled.

The removal work was done by Costello Dismantling Co. in September 2008. The tugboats Sea Wolf, Sea Bear and Miss Yvette assisted. The Coast Guard has replaced the light with flashing buoys.

== History ==
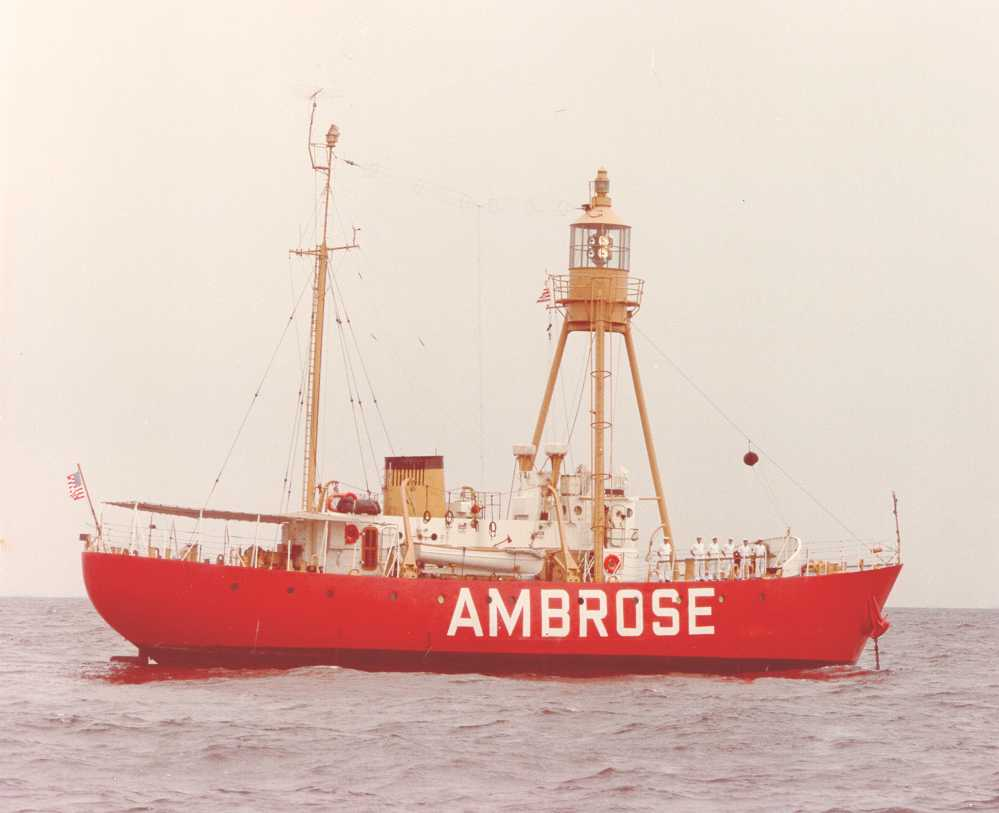
Lightship Ambrose

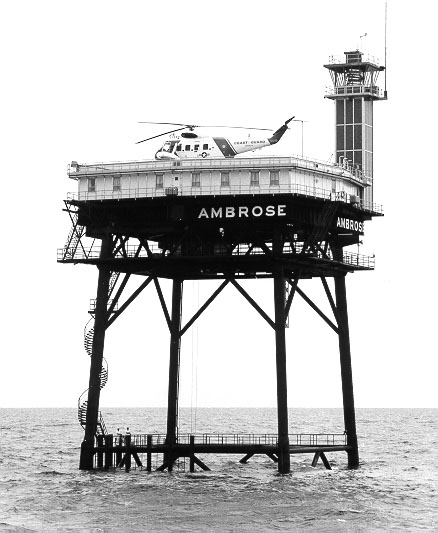
Original Ambrose Light Station, a Texas Tower built in 1967

Various lightships held this station from 1823 until its replacement in 1967. The original was only the fourth lightship designed and commissioned to serve a U.S. coastal port. One of these, Lightship Ambrose (built 1908) is now a museum in New York City.

The original light station was put into operation on August 23, 1967, replacing the obsolete Lightship Ambrose, and cost $2.4 million. The tower design was a Texas Tower, a very strong steel pipe structure based on the oil platforms built for use in the Gulf of Mexico. The structure was prefabricated in Norfolk, Virginia and shipped in sections on barges for assembly on-site. The tower station was about 7.5 miles (12.1 km) off the coast of Sandy Hook, New Jersey in about 70 feet (21 m) of water and was supported by four 42-inch (1,100 mm) steel pipes, sunk down about 245 feet (75 m) to bedrock. The light was about 136 feet (41 m) above mean low water and the 10,000,000 candle-power light could be seen for 18 nautical miles (33 km).

The lower deck was designed for fuel and water storage while the top deck was living quarters for a 6 to 9 man crew. The roof of the platform served as a flight deck for helicopters, the main mode of transport to the station for crew rotations. The tower was automated and the crew was removed from duty on October 15, 1988. Ambrose light station was controlled electronically by the United States Coast Guard station on Governors Island until the island and base were transferred to New York State and City for $1 in 2003.

On a clear night in October 1996 the 754-foot (230 m) Greek oil tanker Aegeo struck the tower, causing severe damage. Coast Guard Lighthouse Technicians verified that the light was functioning properly when the tanker hit the tower. The Aegeo's captain was later found to be at fault. Three years later, in September 1999 after repairs were deemed insufficient, the old structure was razed by the U.S. Army Corps of Engineers and replaced with a new tower. The new tower was built about 1.5 miles (2.4 km) east of the old site, and was approximately 76 feet (23 m) above mean low water, and the 60,000 candle-power light was visible for 18 nautical miles (33 km).

In January 2001, the 492-foot (150 m) Maltese freighter Kouros V struck the new tower. The tower suffered extensive damage, and the light was rendered inoperable. A temporary lighted buoy was set by the Coast Guard on November 7.

On November 3, 2007, the 819-foot (250 m) Bahamas-Registered Tankship M/T Axel Spirit struck the tower. This time, Ambrose Light was damaged beyond repair.

On July 25, 2008, the Coast Guard announced the dismantlement of Ambrose Light would begin on July 28, 2008.

The tower carried NOAA's National Data Buoy Center automated weather station ALSN6, which was of interest to scuba divers, fishermen, and other small craft users. The tower was a staging point for pilot ships, notably the Sandy Hook Pilots.
