= Sapelo Island =

Island in Georgia, United States

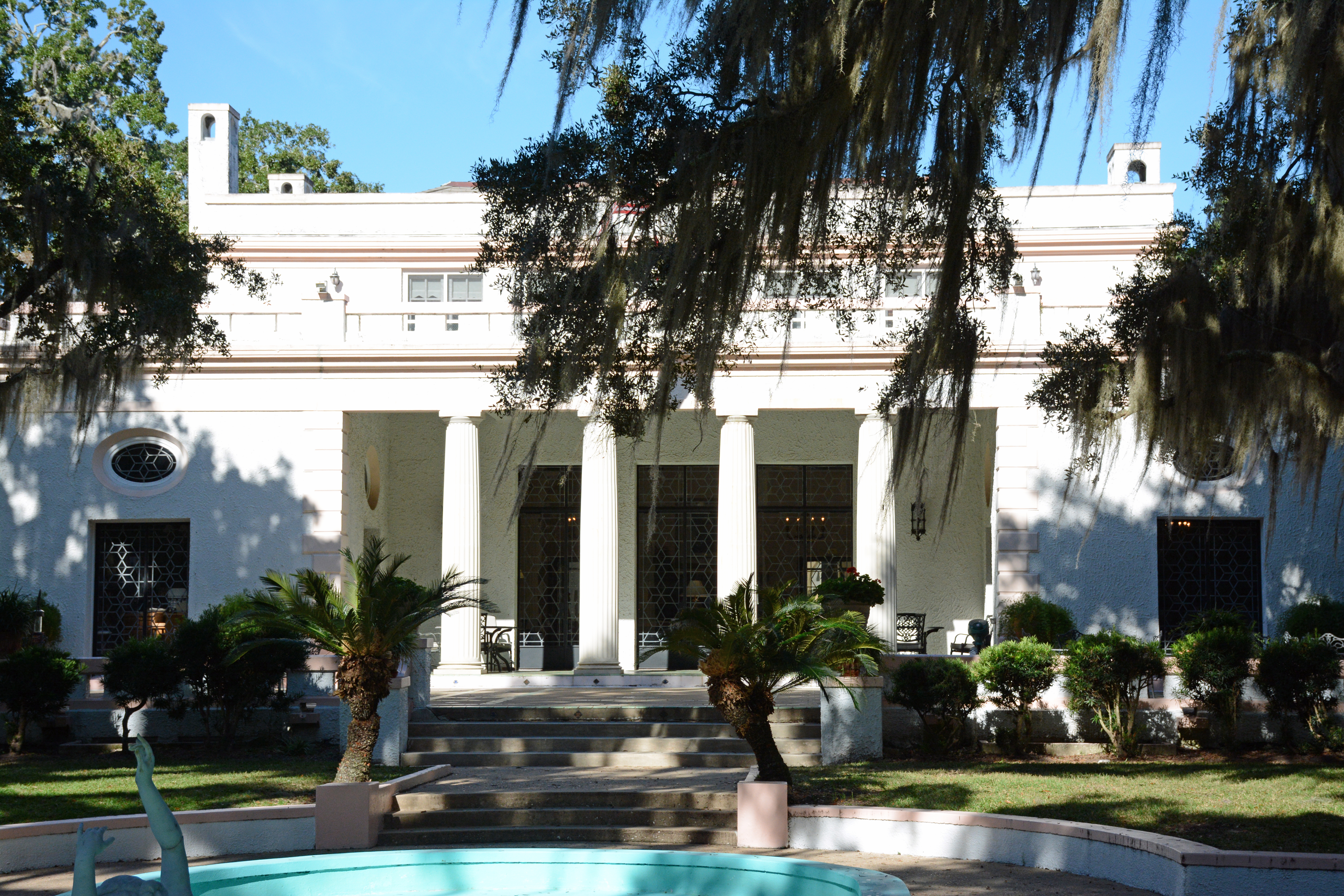
- R. J. Reynolds mansion

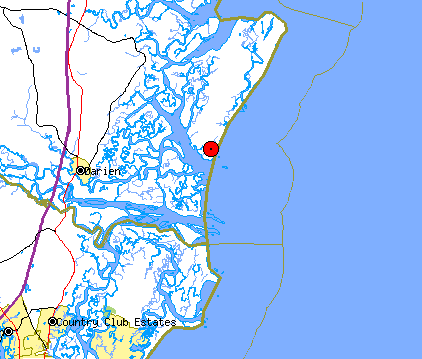
- Sapelo Island map

- Location in Georgia Location in United States
- Interactive map of Sapelo Island

Geography
- Location: McIntosh County, Georgia
- Coordinates: 31°28′39″N 81°14′30″W

Administration
- United States

Sapelo Island /ˈsæpəloʊ/ is a state-protected barrier island located in McIntosh County, Georgia. The island is accessible only by boat; the primary ferry comes from the Sapelo Island Visitors Center in McIntosh County, Georgia, a seven-mile (11 km), twenty-minute trip. It is the site of Hog Hammock, the last known Gullah community. Access to the island is restricted to residents, landowners, or guests thereof. Public access must be obtained by getting a permit issued by state tourism authorities.

Approximately 97 percent of the island is owned by the state of Georgia and is managed by the Georgia Department of Natural Resources; the remainder is under private ownership. The western perimeter of Sapelo is the Sapelo Island National Estuarine Research Reserve (SINERR) which is part of NOAA's National Estuarine Research Reserve system (NERR). The University of Georgia Marine Institute, which is focused on research and education, is located on 1,500 acres (610 ha) on the south end of the island. The Reynolds Mansion, a Georgia State Park, also lies on the south end of the island. Visitors to the island must be a part of an organized tour or guests of residents on the island.

== Hog Hammock ==
The community of Hog Hammock, also known as Hogg Hummock, includes homes, a general store, bar, public library, and other small businesses including vacation rentals. There are two active church congregations in Hog Hammock: St. Luke Baptist Church, founded in 1885, and First African Baptist Church, established in 1866. The latter congregation has an older building known as First African Baptist Church at Raccoon Bluff, constructed in 1900 in the former Raccoon Bluff community north of Hog Hammock. It is used for special services and programs.

Many of the full-time inhabitants of the Hog Hammock Community are African Americans known as Gullah-Geechees, specifically Saltwater Geechees, who descended from enslaved native West African people brought to the island in the 1700s and 1800s to work on island plantations. The current population of full-time Gullah-Geechee residents in the community is estimated to be 47 (2009). The residents must bring all supplies from the mainland or purchase them in the small store on the island. The children of Hog Hammock take the ferry to the mainland and then take a bus to school, as the island school closed in 1978.

Hog Hammock is also home to the Sapelo Island Cultural and Revitalization Society, Inc. (SICARS), a non-profit organization whose mission is to preserve and revitalize the Hogg Hummock Community. SICARS was founded in 1993 by Hogg Hummock residents and non-resident descendants who wanted to enhance the future of their community by educating all visitors to the island about the history and to increase awareness that Sapelo has existed as an African community for over 200 years. SICARS was incorporated in 1994, has over 600 members, and continues to grow each year. The organization hosts a Cultural Day festival every third Saturday in October.

The entire 427 acres (173 ha) of the community was listed on the National Register of Historic Places in 1996 as Hog Hammock Historic District.

In the 1990s, people from the mainland began acquiring parcels of land from the Gullah-Geechee people to construct vacation homes. In 2012, McIntosh County property tax appraisers notified Hog Hammock residents of huge property tax increases, even though there was no longer a school on the island and the DNR manages and pays for water, trash removal, and the ferry and barge system. There are no emergency services on the island, everything is volunteer-run by the residents and state staff. One Hog Hammock property owner's annual tax bill soared from $600 to $2,100.

In 2013, a legal fight over the sudden tax hikes was well underway, with some residents claiming they would be driven from land they had owned for many generations for the benefit of mainlanders who would acquire more of Hog Hammock's homes. The major paved roadways on the island were unmaintained by the county and had significant issues with flooding and overflowing ditch networks. A resolution was agreed, on which the county was to pay for new equipment for a volunteer fire station and revamp an aging building for a community center.

=== 2023 Zoning ordinance ===
In 2023, McIntosh County again came under legal issues with the Hog Hammock community and Sapelo Island. They issued a zoning ordinance update which changed the historic area’s mandated restriction of only 1,400 sq ft indoor space to 3,200 sq ft. This came after a local non-descendant, Bill Hodges, who is also on the McIntosh County Industry and Development Authority Board, filed a complaint that he could not build a large enough vacation home for his family. This in turn led to McIntosh County Planning proposing a rather radical ordinance in contrast to their Comprehensive Plan, which stated it would protect the historic nature of Hog Hammock community. The community’s residents were barred from bringing recording equipment or phones into the public hearing for the new ordinance and the hearing was set with very little notice and after the last ferry left for the island that day, leaving many residents to choose between attending the hearing and sleeping in their home for the night.

Numerous complaints were heard, including officials from the state about the lack of capacity in the water system for larger homes, from residents about the changing historic nature of the island and the tax hike that would result, and from scientists stating the flooding would increase in the community from the added weight of larger homes, and from religious leaders who stated Hog Hammock was a religious center for Muslim and Christians alike and allowing large vacation homes and the other proposed changes would result in less affordable options for current historic homeowners. McIntosh County planning department pushed the ordinance forward anyways, stating that the commissioners could vote to send it back to them to fix all of the obvious problems instead of pulling the ordinance and reworking it with the community. They reassured the community several times stating that the commission would return it back to them to fix the issues, but they had to go ahead with it as written for now. Numerous lawyers present commented on the situation as the meetings procedure was “extremely out of the ordinary for a public hearing” and did not keep with Georgia laws and regulations for “numerous reasons”.

At the first of two commission meetings, which were held not even 3 days later and again held after the last ferry left for the day, the public comment period was fraught with controversy and outcry. Then some of the county commissioners and the county manager maintained that the county was trying to keep residents happy and allow progress in the protected community, but several accused Commissioners of not abiding by their own regulations and comprehensive planning process to abide new developers' interests in the island over the residents. The County Manager, Patrick Zoucks, publicly accused the DNR of causing the issue as public lands in the states holding are not on the tax bracket in the county, forcing the county to be desperate for funds. He posted this to the county Facebook page and in newspaper articles.

After several complaints were filed, the press and recording devices were then allowed for the last commissioners meeting- during which the commission voted for the ordinance to be passed in a 3-2 vote. Three in favor were of the vote were the Chairman at the time, David Stevens, Commissioner Kate Karwacki (a local realtor), and Commissioner at large Davis Poole. The two votes not in favor were of Commissioner William E. Harrell and Commissioner Roger Lotson, whose district actually holds Sapelo Island and who had been on the island and seen firsthand why 3,400 sq ft homes would not work logistically. In a controversial move, Commissioner David Stevens ended the meeting after the vote by saying that “this new generation [on Sapelo] just didn’t have it” and insulted the community saying this was their own fault for “being greedy” and selling their land to developers to begin with. Numerous complaints, legal challenges, and referendums have now been filed and are still pending.

On January 21, 2026, residents of McIntosh County voted to override the 2023 zoning decision by County commissioners. Residents and supporters obtained over 2,300 signatures on a petition to challenge the commissioners before the Supreme Court of Georgia and forced a special election.

=== 2024 ferry gangway collapse ===
On October 19, 2024, a gangway to a ferry at a marina collapsed during a Sapelo Island Cultural Day celebration, killing 7 and injuring several more.

== History ==
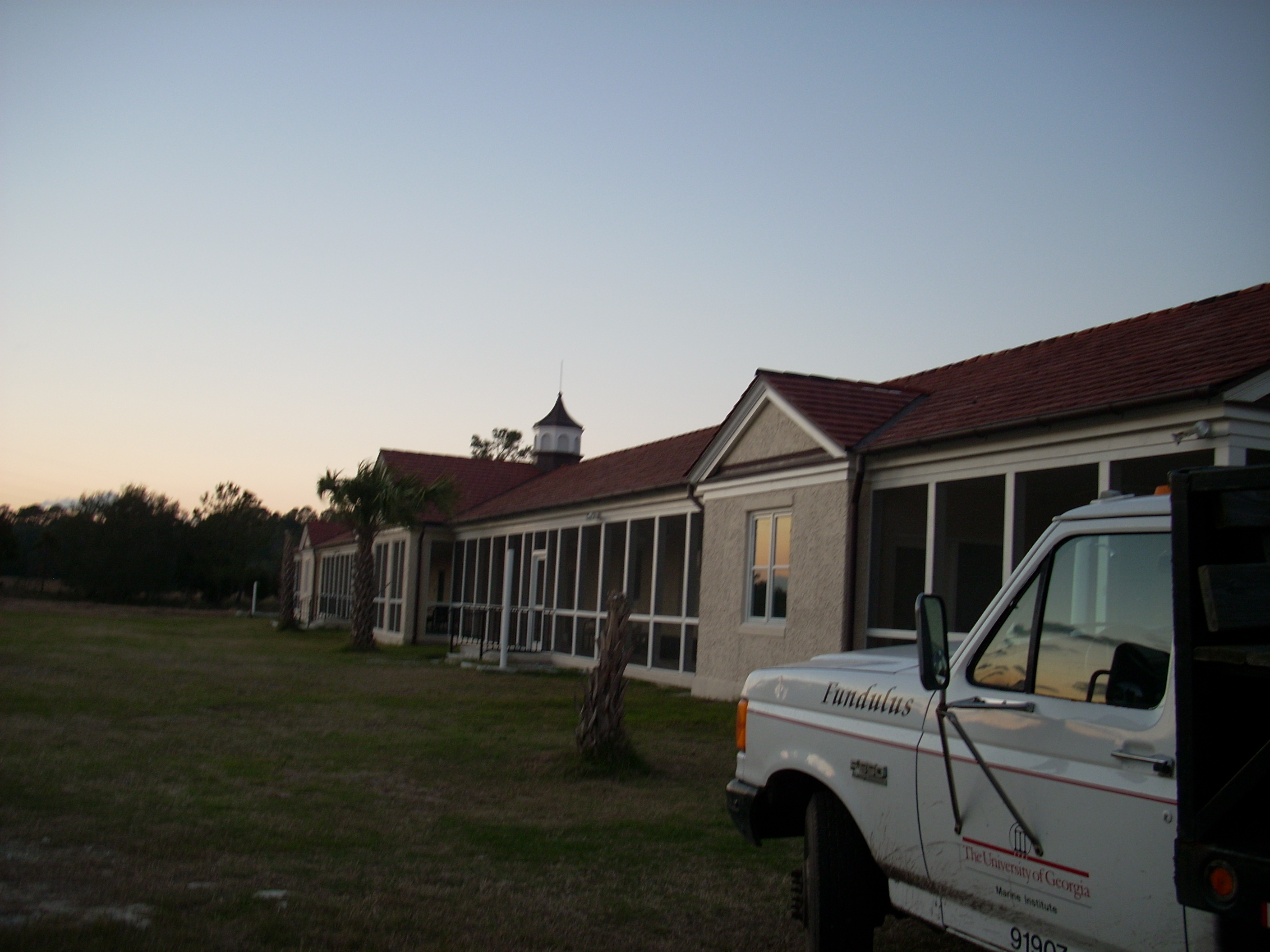
University of Georgia dormitories on Sapelo Island

Sapelo Island is speculated to be the site of San Miguel de Gualdape, the short-lived (1526–1527) first European settlement in the present-day United States, and if true, it would also be the first place in the present-day U.S. that a Catholic mass was celebrated.

Sapelo, a name of Native origin, was known to the Spanish as Zapala. During the 17th century, the island was part of the Guale missionary province of Spanish Florida. After 1680, several missions were merged and moved to the island under the mission Santa Catalina de Guale.

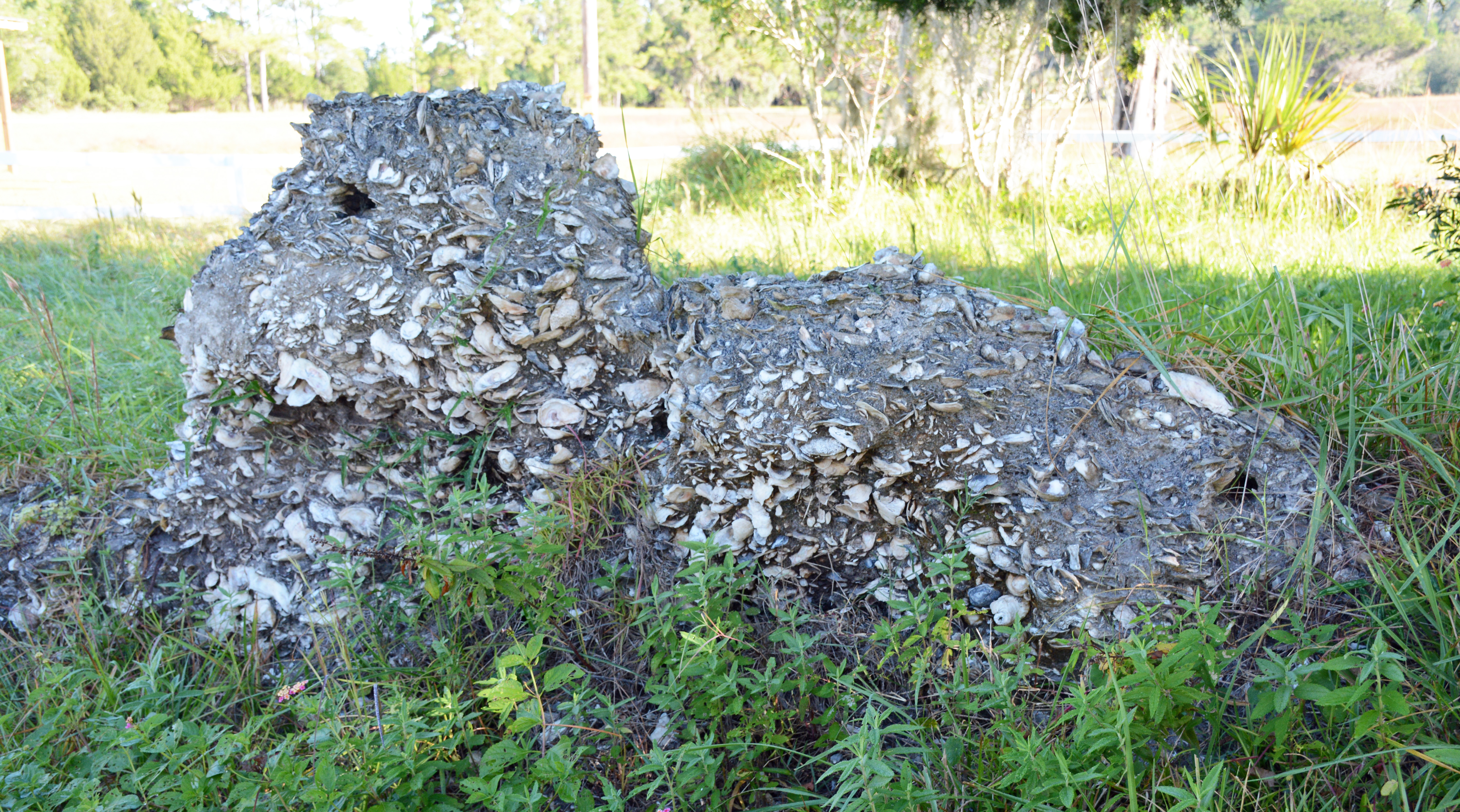
Tabby ruins of Spalding's 1809 sugar mill

In the early 19th century, Thomas Spalding, a future senator and U.S. Representative, bought the island and developed it into a plantation, selling live oak for shipbuilding, introducing irrigation ditches, and cultivating Sea Island Cotton, corn, and sugar cane. Spalding brought 400 slaves to the island from West Africa and the West Indies to work the plantation and build what became the Spalding Mansion.

One of the slaves owned by Thomas Spalding was Bilali Muhammad, an Islamic scholar from West Africa who wrote a 13-page document about Islamic law on the island — possibly the first manuscript of Islamic law written in the United States.

In 1820, a Winslow Lewis brick lighthouse was built on the island. Although it remained dark for over 90 years, it was restored and relit in 1998.

Spalding opposed the abolition of slavery, and he died in 1851 returning from a convention to assert Georgia's position on the matter. When freed, the former slaves established several settlements on the island; the last remaining is Hog Hammock, with approximately 70 remaining land owners. During the Civil War, the Spalding home was heavily vandalized and lay in ruins.

By the early 20th century, the International Road Races were attracting notables from the motor world to Savannah, Georgia. One attendee was Howard E. Coffin, founder of the Hudson Motor Car Company. Coffin purchased the entire island, except for the land owned by the former slaves, for $150,000 in 1912. Like Spalding, the Coffins embarked on numerous projects. Miles of shell-covered roads were laid, creeks were bridged, old fields were cultivated and large tracts were set aside for cattle grazing. The Coffins also renovated and enlarged the Spalding house, creating an island paradise unsurpassed on the coast. Former presidents Calvin Coolidge and Herbert Hoover as well as aviator Charles Lindbergh were guests in the home.

Tobacco heir Richard Joshua Reynolds Jr., of R.J. Reynolds Tobacco Company bought Sapelo from Coffin in 1934 during the Great Depression, and continued the tradition of agricultural experimentation of the previous owners. Reynolds and his family used his private island paradise as a part-time residence for three decades, consolidating the island's African-American residents into Hog Hammock. Many worked as servants in South End House, later renamed the Reynolds Mansion by the State of Georgia.

=== Ecology research ===
In 1923, Sapelo owner Howard Coffin introduced imported chachalacas from Mexico to diversify the game bird population for his hunting pals. These chicken-like birds have established a stable, non-native population of 30 to 40 that at times has spread to neighboring islands.

Sapelo owner R.J. Reynolds, Jr. founded the Sapelo Island Research Foundation in 1949. He later funded the research of Eugene Odum, whose 1958 paper The Ecology of a Salt Marsh won wide acclaim in scientific circles. Odum's paper helped show the fragility of the cycle of nature in the wetlands.

Reynolds' Sapelo Research Foundation also helped fund the University of Georgia's research on the island. Reynolds' widow, Annemarie Reynolds, sold Sapelo to the state of Georgia for $1 million, a fraction of its worth, in two separate transactions in 1969 and 1976. The latter sale resulted in the creation of the Sapelo Island National Estuarine Research Reserve, a state-federal partnership between the Georgia Department of Natural Resources and the National Oceanic and Atmospheric Administration. In part to the philanthropy of the Reynolds family, Sapelo is now open to the public by appointment.

=== Geologic history ===
Sapelo Island is located within the Georgia Bight, a tidally influenced coastline that experiences two tidal cycles each day. Average difference between low and high tides at Sapelo Island is ~7 feet (2.1 m). Consequently, Sapelo island is an example of a tidally influenced barrier island system. Over the last 2.5 million years (Quaternary Period), sea-level fall occurred in response to growth of the Northern Hemisphere ice cap. The resulting regression generated shoreline complexes that preceded the modern Holocene shoreline, with the most recent known as the late Pleistocene Silver Bluff Formation. The Silver Bluff deposits underlie Holocene Sapelo Island sediments, and they are visible along the southwestern bank of Blackbeard Creek as the Raccoon Bluff. During the last glacial maximum (LGM) approximately 18,000 years ago (latest Pleistocene), maximum regression forced the Sapelo Island shoreline eastward approximately 62 miles (100 km) from its present-day location. During the subsequent transgression, a Holocene shoreline formed the present Sapelo Island shoreline complex, including Cabretta and Nannygoat beaches.

=== Hurricane Irma ===
In 2017, storm surge from Hurricane Irma caused a tidal inlet to breach the southern end of Blackbeard Island, and it created a small island between Sapelo Island and Blackbeard Island.

== Climate ==
Climate data for Sapelo Island (1991–2020 normals, extremes 1957–present)
Month	Jan	Feb	Mar	Apr	May	Jun	Jul	Aug	Sep	Oct	Nov	Dec	Year
Record high °F (°C)	83 (28)	86 (30)	89 (32)	95 (35)	99 (37)	101 (38)	105 (41)	102 (39)	98 (37)	94 (34)	89 (32)	84 (29)	105 (41)
Mean daily maximum °F (°C)	62.0 (16.7)	64.4 (18.0)	70.2 (21.2)	76.5 (24.7)	83.2 (28.4)	88.5 (31.4)	91.3 (32.9)	90.0 (32.2)	86.0 (30.0)	79.1 (26.2)	70.8 (21.6)	64.4 (18.0)	77.2 (25.1)
Daily mean °F (°C)	52.3 (11.3)	54.8 (12.7)	60.5 (15.8)	67.1 (19.5)	74.8 (23.8)	80.3 (26.8)	83.0 (28.3)	82.1 (27.8)	78.6 (25.9)	70.4 (21.3)	61.5 (16.4)	55.1 (12.8)	68.4 (20.2)
Mean daily minimum °F (°C)	42.6 (5.9)	45.2 (7.3)	50.9 (10.5)	57.8 (14.3)	66.3 (19.1)	72.2 (22.3)	74.8 (23.8)	74.3 (23.5)	71.2 (21.8)	61.8 (16.6)	52.1 (11.2)	45.9 (7.7)	59.6 (15.3)
Record low °F (°C)	3 (−16)	10 (−12)	20 (−7)	32 (0)	41 (5)	51 (11)	59 (15)	58 (14)	48 (9)	34 (1)	25 (−4)	9 (−13)	3 (−16)
Average precipitation inches (mm)	3.62 (92)	3.09 (78)	3.27 (83)	3.54 (90)	2.90 (74)	6.61 (168)	4.37 (111)	6.66 (169)	5.87 (149)	4.68 (119)	2.32 (59)	3.02 (77)	49.95 (1,269)
Average precipitation days (≥ 0.01 in)	8.5	8.0	7.3	6.5	6.7	10.4	9.6	11.9	10.8	7.3	6.2	8.2	101.4
Source: NOAA

== Tourism ==
The Georgia Department of Natural Resources (DNR) offers tours several days a week. These can be booked through the Sapelo Island Visitors Center. Additionally, many island residents offer private tours, which can often be customized to fit the interests of individual tourists. A state campground is also available to groups of 15 to 25 people on Cabretta Island, adjacent to Sapelo Island.

== Notable people ==
- Jean de Bérard-Moquet-Montalet, former large landowner on the island

== In popular culture ==
Sapelo Island resident and descendant of Bilali Muhammed, Cornelia Walker Bailey, wrote the book God, Dr. Buzzard, and the Bolito Man: A saltwater Geechee talk about life on Sapelo Island, Georgia, which is a first-person account of growing up on Sapelo; co-author Christena Bledsoe.

R. J. Reynolds' grandson Patrick Reynolds and author Tom Shachtman co-authored The Gilded Leaf: Triumph, tragedy, and tobacco – three generations of the R. J. Reynolds fortune and family, which offers an unvarnished view of R. J. Reynolds, Jr. during the time he owned Sapelo.

Author Tom Poland wrote a novel titled Forbidden Island ... an Island Called Sapelo.

Singer Larry Jon Wilson has recorded a song titled "Sapelo", which is about the island on the album Testifying: The Country Soul Revue.

Author and island resident Michele Nicole Johnson published the photograph book Sapelo Island's Hog Hammock in 2009.

Author T. C. Boyle set his 1990 novel East Is East on a fictional island in Georgia, much of which resembles Sapelo Island, such as the presence of Hog Hammock and proximity to Darien.

An episode of Season 6 of the show Dirty Jobs featured the termite research program at the University of Georgia Marine Institute on Sapelo Island.

The Sapelo Island National Estuarine Research Reserve (NERR) hosts a Podcast titled ‘Sapelo NERRds’ about the research being conducted on the island and across Coastal Georgia.

An episode of ESPN's Outside the Lines was filmed on Sapelo Island and the Hog Hammock community in 2013, documenting the childhood of Allen Bailey and telling the community's story and current property tax issues.

The podcast Uncivil was mostly based on the experience of local Gullah people struggling to keep their land and culture intact despite many legal struggles. "A 19th century promise, and a 21st century betrayal. The past and present of 40 acres and a mule."

PBS America Reframed has an episode on Sapelo. About 90 minutes, it includes extensive footage of interviews of Cornelia Walker Bailey and her family.

Ronda Rich has written an adventure novel set on the island, Sapelo Island. It is "a Stella Bankwell mystery".

== See also ==
- Sapelo Island Range Front Light
- Sapelo Island Light
- Sapelo red peas
- Behavior Cemetery
- First African Baptist Church at Raccoon Bluff
