= Sapelo Island Light =

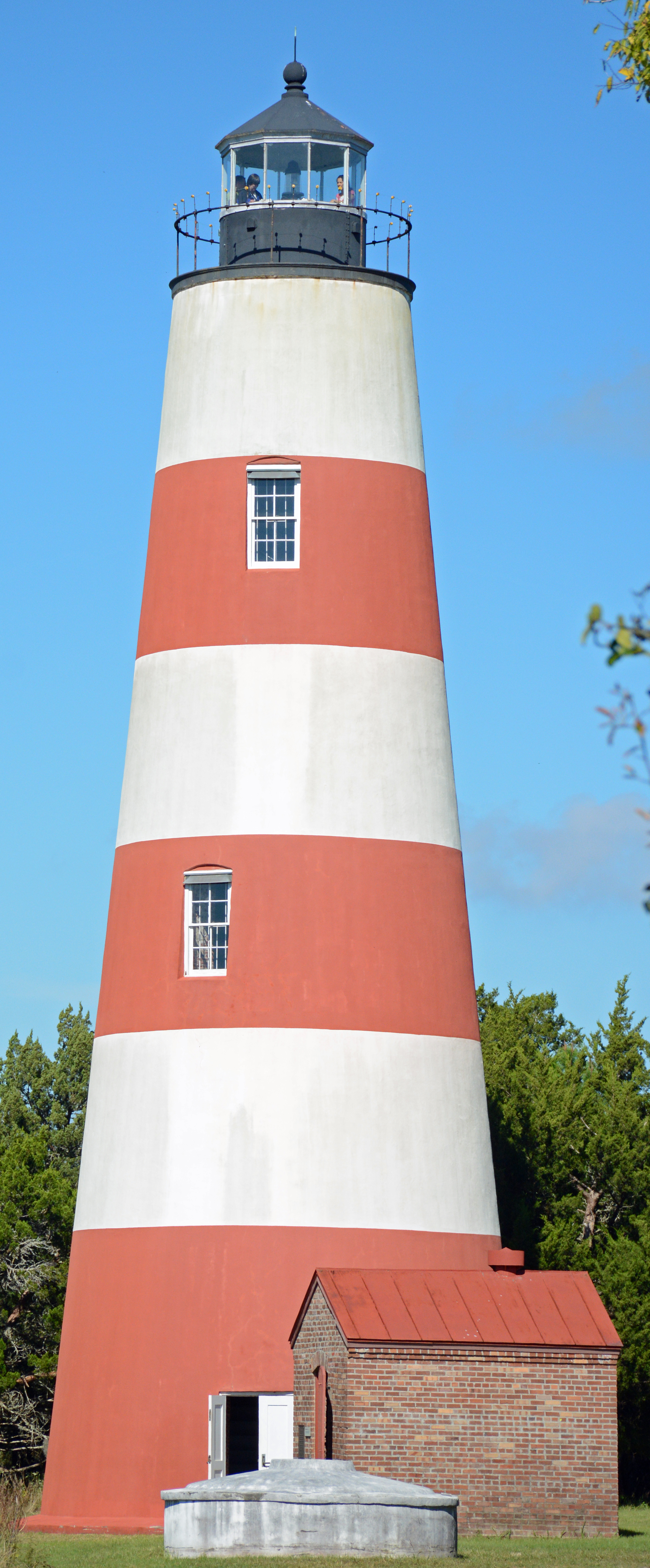
- Sapelo Island Light
- Location: Darien, Georgia
- Coordinates: 31.39127°N 81.28568°W

Tower
- Constructed: 1820
- Construction: Brick
- Height: 80 ft (24 m)
- Shape: Conical
- Markings: 6 alternate red and white horizontal
- Heritage: National Register of Historic Places listed place

Light
- First lit: 1820
- Deactivated: 1905 to 1998
- Focal height: 23 m (75 ft)
- Lens: Lewis lamp (1820); Fourth-order Fresnel lens (1854)
- Characteristic: Fixed white varied by a white flash every 45 s
- Sapelo Island Lighthouse
- U.S. National Register of Historic Places
- U.S. Historic district
- Location: S end of Sapelo Island, S of University of Georgia Marine Institute, Sapelo Island, Georgia
- Area: 205.9 acres (83.3 ha)
- Built: 1905
- Architect: Winslow Lewis
- NRHP reference No.: 97000335
- Added to NRHP: August 26, 1997

Sapelo Island Lighthouse is a lighthouse in Georgia, United States, near the southern tip of Sapelo Island. It is the nation's second-oldest brick lighthouse and the oldest survivor among lighthouses designed by Winslow Lewis. The lighthouse, oil building, the cistern, the footing of the 1905 light, the ruins of the fortification, and the associated range light were added to the National Register of Historic Places in 1997.

The lighthouse is a 65-foot (20 m) brick structure, about 30 feet (9.1 m) in diameter at the base and 12 feet (3.7 m) at the top. Its brick walls are several feet thick at the bottom, tapering to about two feet thick at the top.

== History ==
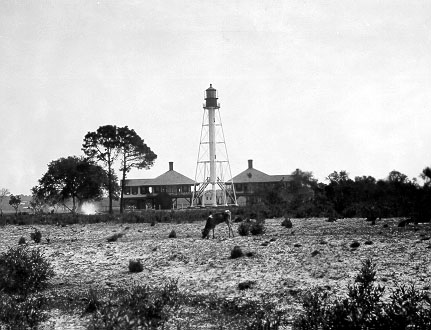
Skeleton tower that stood from 1905 to 1933

Sapelo Island Lighthouse was built in 1820. It was designed and built by Winslow Lewis. It had fifteen Lewis lamps with 16 in (41 cm) reflectors. In the 1850s, the tower was raised by 10 ft (3.0 m) and a fourth-order Fresnel lens was installed in 1854. The lens was removed during the Civil War. It was extensively repaired after an 1867 storm and relit in 1868. The tower was damaged by a strong hurricane in 1898.

A pyramidal 100 ft (30 m) skeletal tower lighthouse with a third-order Fresnel lens was built in 1905. This tower was dismantled and relocated in 1934 to South Fox Island, Michigan.

The 1820 lighthouse was inactive from 1905 to 1998, when it was restored to its 1890 appearance and was relit (with a modern light and lens). Is now maintained by the Georgia Department of Natural Resources and is unofficial.

== Keepers ==
- Jeremiah Lester 1821–1825
- William Donnelly 1827–1841
- Henry M. Caulder 1843–?
- William Thomas 1845–1847
- Robert B. Mason 1849–1851
- Robert Hale ? – 1853)
- Alexander Hazzard 1853–1862, 1868–1869
- W.W. Brown 1869
- James C. Clark 1869–1870
- Montgomery P. Styles 1870–1871
- J.T. Clancy 1871
- Hiram Hammett 1871–1872
- John Bradwell 1872–1873
- James Cromley Sr. 1873–1889
- William G. Cromley 1890–1900
- James Cromley Jr. 1900–1921
- Robert H. Cromley 1928–1933

== See also ==
- Sapelo Island Range Front Light
