= Tybee Island Light =

Lighthouse in Georgia, United States

Tybee Island Lighthouse and Museum
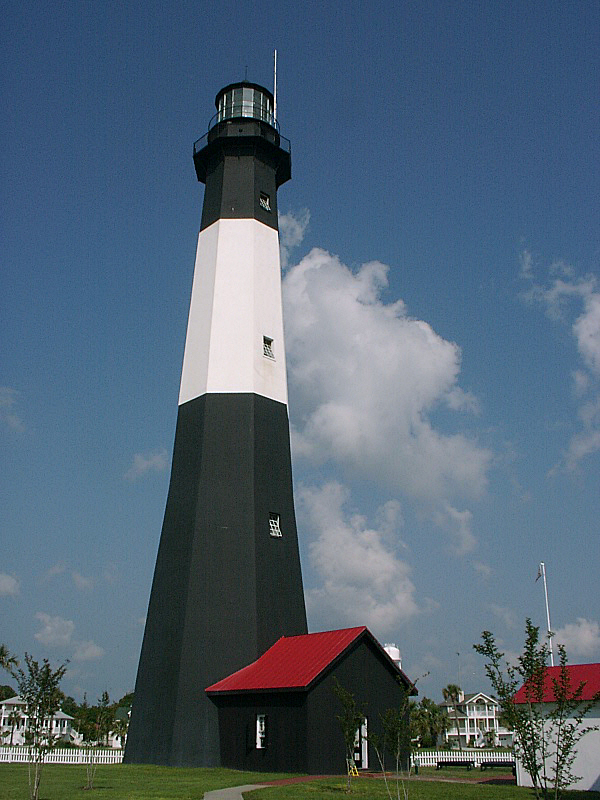
- Location: Tybee Island, Georgia
- Coordinates: 32°01′20″N 80°50′44″W

Tower
- Constructed: 1736
- Foundation: Stone and timber
- Construction: Brick
- Automated: 1972
- Height: 144 feet (44 m)
- Shape: Octagonal
- Markings: Lower 50 feet (15 m) black; upper part, white; lantern, black

Light
- First lit: 1867
- Focal height: 44 m (144 ft)
- Lens: 1791: Oil lamps 1867: First-order Fresnel lens
- Range: 16 nautical miles; 29 kilometres (18 mi)
- Characteristic: F. W

The Tybee Island Light is a lighthouse located on the north end of Tybee Island, Georgia. It overlooks the Savannah River at the point where the river meets the Atlantic Ocean. The Tybee Light is one of seven surviving colonial-era lighthouse towers in the United States, but it was heavily modified during the mid-nineteenth century.

== History ==
The current lighthouse is the fourth tower at this station, and its two predecessors were never lit. The first tower was built at the direction of James Oglethorpe and was constructed of wood; erected in 1736, it was felled by a storm in 1741. The following year a replacement was erected, this time of stone and wood, but still without illumination; instead, it was topped with a flag pole. This tower succumbed to shoreline erosion.

The third tower was constructed in 1773 by John Mullryne, a brick tower originally 100 ft (30 m) in height. It was first fitted with a system of reflectors and candles, but this was upgraded to oil lamps after it was ceded to the federal government in 1790. A second tower was added to the site in 1822 to form a range. Both towers received Fresnel lenses in 1857, with the lower front tower being equipped with a 4th order lens, while the main tower received a larger 2nd order lens.

Confederate forces burned the light in 1862 during the Civil War and removed the lens as they retreated to Fort Pulaski. Reconstruction of the light was begun in 1866 but was delayed by a cholera outbreak. A new tower was constructed atop the first 60 ft (18 m) of the old tower, raising the height of the whole to 154 ft (47 m). This tower was equipped with a 1st order lens. The front beacon was now a 50 ft (15 m) wooden skeleton tower equipped with a new 4th order lens.

The main tower was severely damaged in a hurricane in 1871, and developed such serious cracking that a $50,000 appropriation was requested for its replacement. Instead a new front tower (which had already been moved twice) was constructed of iron. New keepers dwellings were constructed in 1881 and 1885. The following year the tower was shaken by the 1886 Charleston earthquake, which damaged the lens and caused further cracking of the brickwork; these were both however immediately repaired. In 1933 the tower was electrified and the station reduced to a single keeper. The beacon was automated in 1972.

Throughout its life the daymark of the tower was modified on numerous occasions. Originally all-white, the base and lantern were painted black in 1887; this was altered in 1914 and again in 1916, each time bringing the black at the top further down the tower until the illustrated configuration was reached. In 1967 the entire tower was repainted with a white base and a gray top. The gray faded severely and was painted black in 1970.

In 1999 a major restoration project was begun under the auspices of the Tybee Island Historical Society, who took possession of the light station in 2002 under the National Historic Lighthouse Preservation Act. As part of this project the tower was repainted in the 1916–1966 black-white-black daymark. The beacon is still a functioning navigational aid, still using its original lens. The site is open to the public and retains its keepers houses and auxiliary buildings as well as the lighthouse tower.

== Images ==
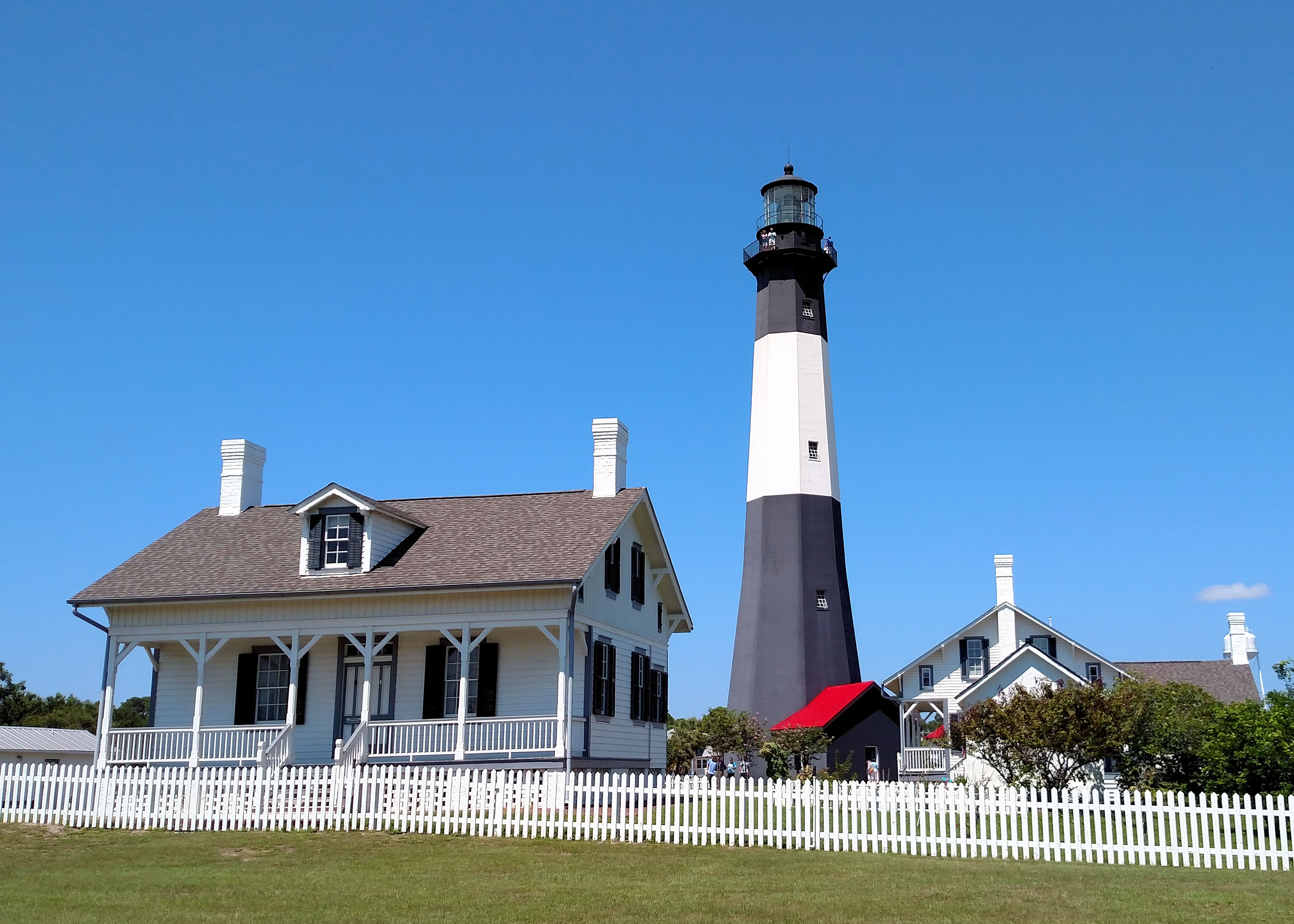
Tybee Island Light, lightkeeper's home, and outbuildings

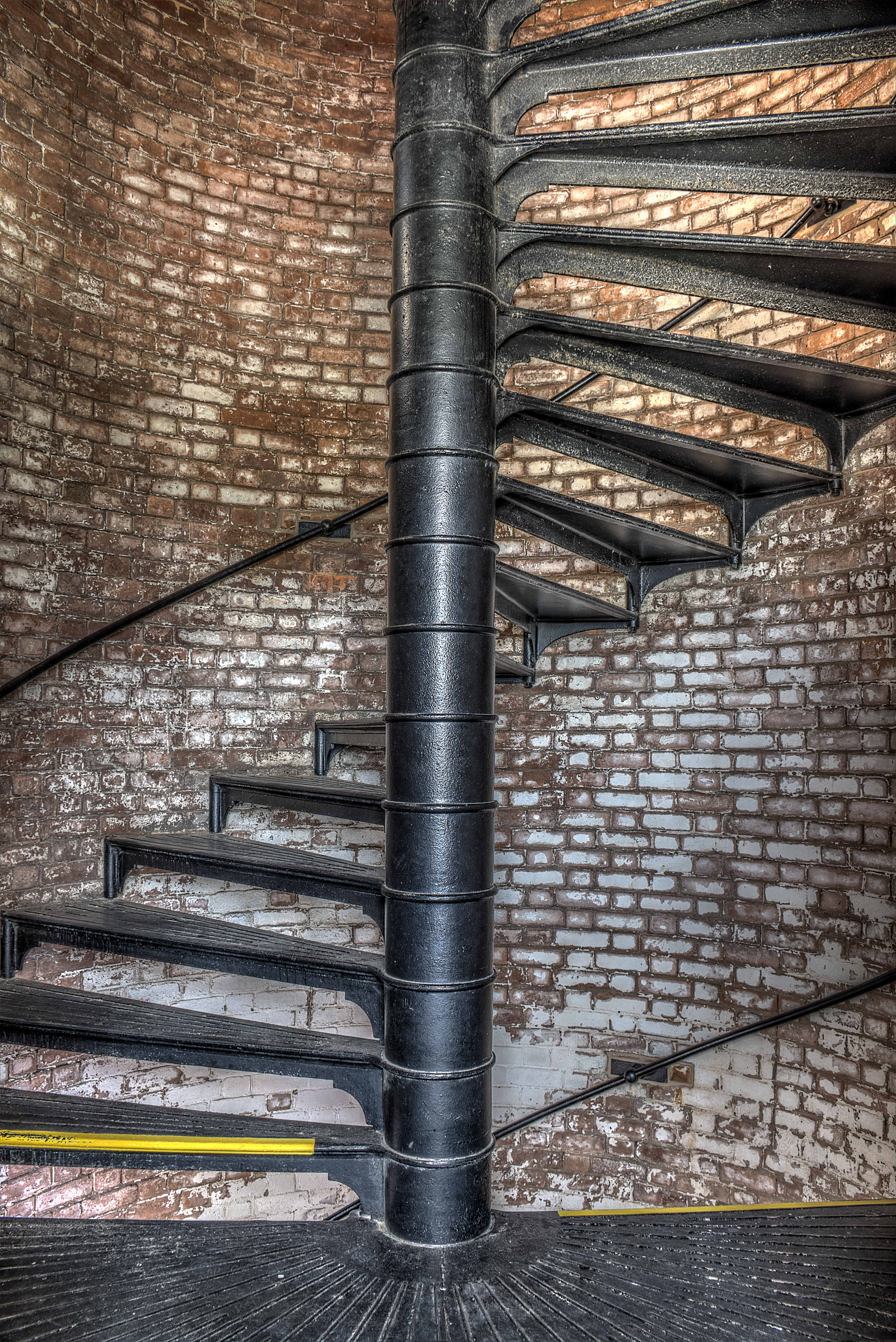
Lighthouse staircase

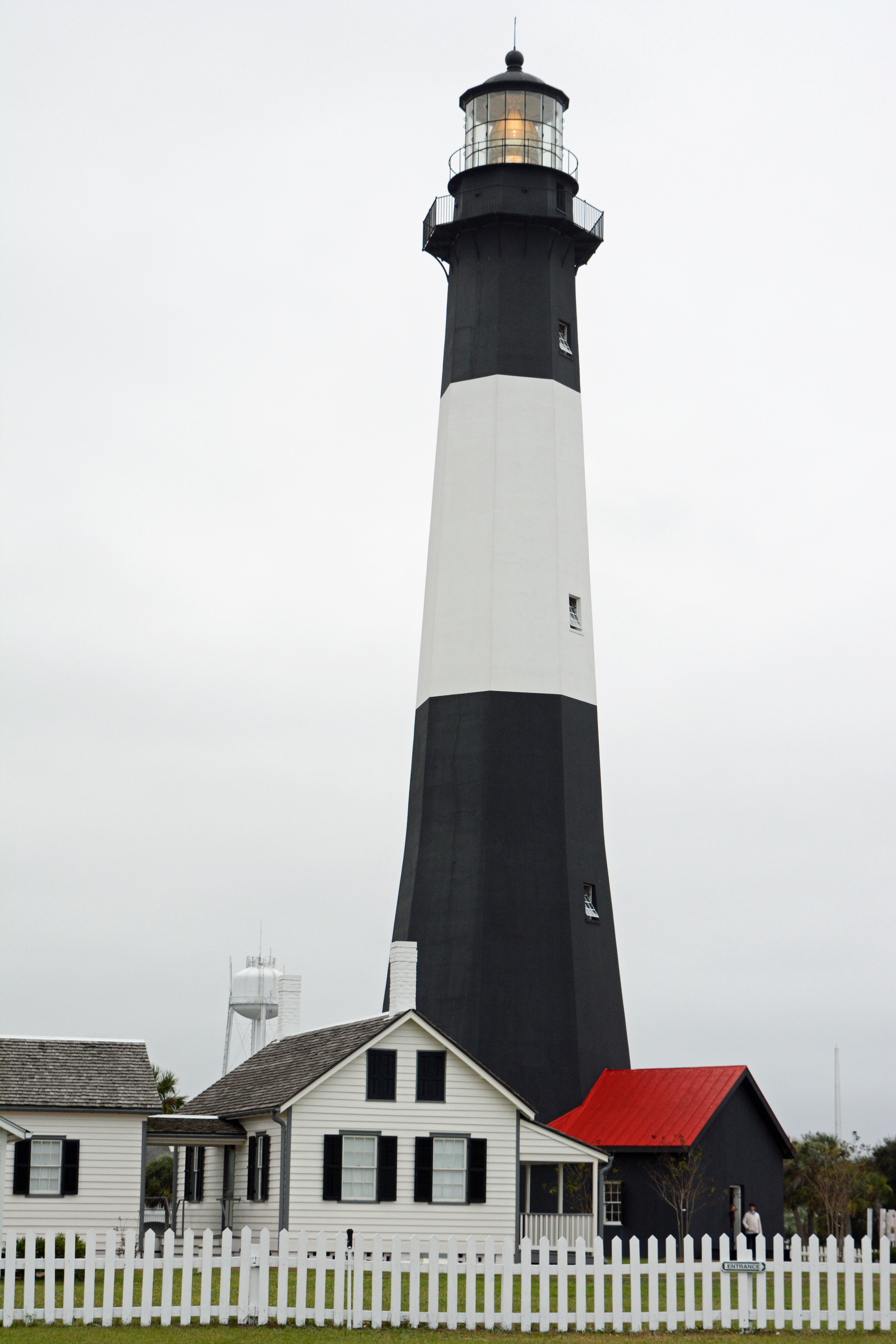
Lighthouse

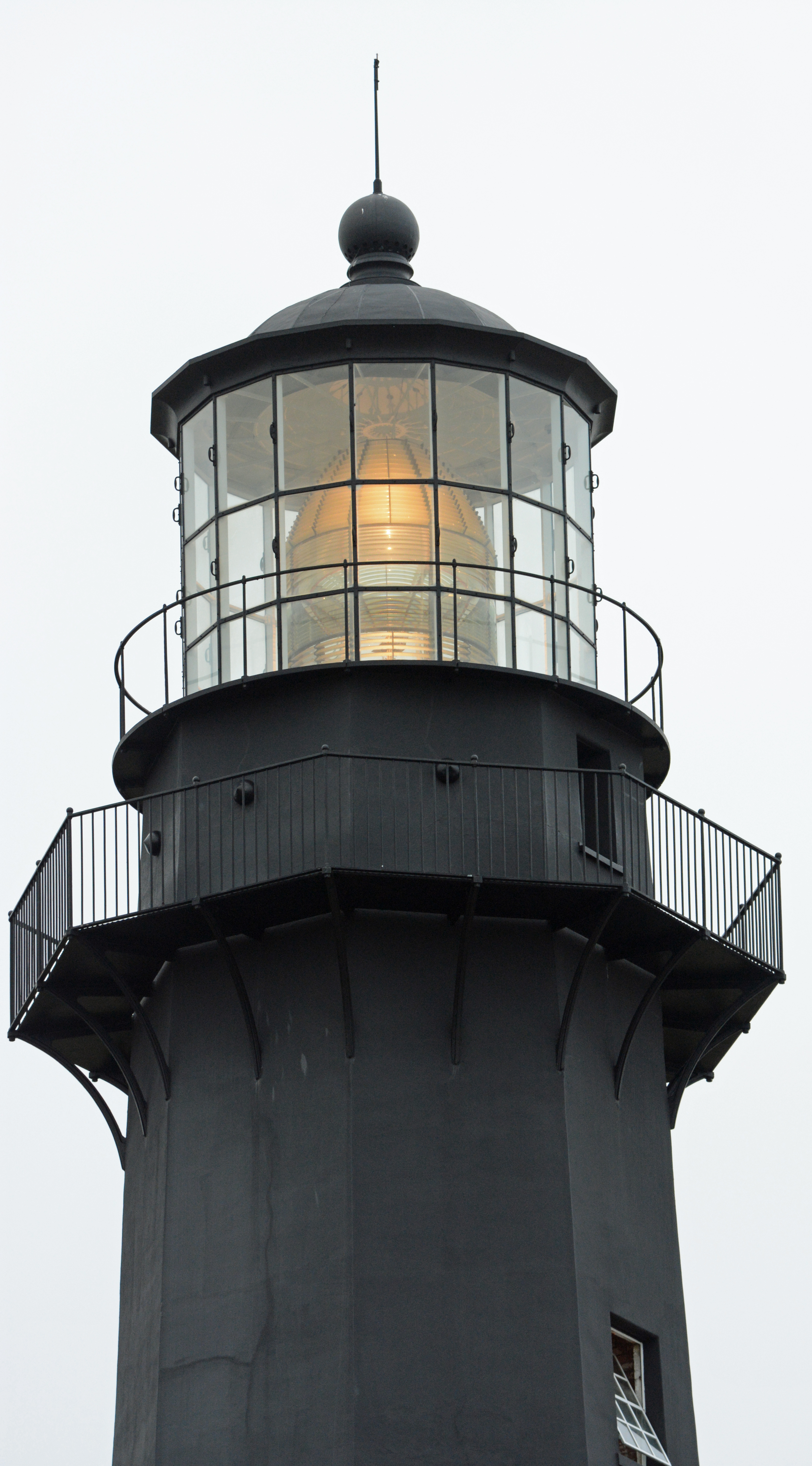
Top with Fresnel lens

== See also ==
- Battle of Fort Pulaski
