= List of lighthouses in Mississippi =

This is a list of all lighthouses in the U.S. state of Mississippi as identified by the United States Coast Guard and other historical sources.

Only two of those listed remain standing, and neither holds a Coast Guard maintained light, though one is maintained privately. Three were replaced by unmanned lights at the same location.

Focal height and coordinates are taken from the 1907 United States Coast Guard Light List, while location and dates of activation, automation, and deactivation are taken from the United States Coast Guard Historical information site for lighthouses.

Name	Image	Location	Coordinates	Year first lit	Automated	Year deactivated	Current Lens	Focal Height
Biloxi Light		Biloxi	30.3956°N 88.9011°W	1848	1941	Active	Unknown	60 ft (18 m)
Cat Island Light		Cat island	30.2322°N 89.1614°W	1831 (First); 1871 (Last)	Never	1937 (Destroyed in 1961)	None	45 ft (14 m)
East Pascagoula River Light		Pascagoula	30.350°N 88.568°W	1854	Never	1906 (Destroyed)	None	35 ft (11 m)
Horn Island Light		Pascagoula	30.224°N 88.485°W (Third light)	1874 (First); 1908 (Last)	1951>	1961 (Destroyed)	None	47 ft (14 m) (Third tower)
Lake Borgne Light		Lake Borgne	30.175°N 89.454°W	1889	Never	1937 (Destroyed)	None	43 ft (13 m)
Merrill Shell Bank Light		Mississippi Sound	30.2425°N 89.2489°W	1860 (First); 1883 (Last)	1932	1945 (Removed)	None	42 ft (13 m)
Natchez Light^{A}	N/A	Natchez	N/A	1828	Never	1839-1840 (Destroyed)	None	35 ft (11 m)
Pass Christian Light		Pass Christian	30.315°N 89.251°W	1831	Never	1882 (Demolished)	None	42 ft (13 m)
Round Island Light		Round Island (later: Pascagoula)	30.291°N 88.585°W (Original); 30.3707°N 88.5559°W (Current)	1833 (First); 1859 (Last)	1944	1949 (Destroyed in 1998, rebuilt in 2012)	Fourth-order Fresnel (Replica)	50 ft (15 m)
Ship Island Light		Ship Island	30.2127°N 88.9661°W	1853 (First); 1886 (Last)	1950	1964 (Destroyed in 1972)	None	76 ft (23 m)
St. Joseph Island Light	N/A	St. Joseph Island	30.191°N 89.422°W	1861	Never	1888 (Destroyed in 1893)	None	Unknown

== Notes ==
A. It is unclear whether this light was ever put in service.
