= National Register of Historic Places listings in Jackson County, Mississippi =

Location of Jackson County in Mississippi

This is a list of the National Register of Historic Places listings in Jackson County, Mississippi.

This is intended to be a complete list of the properties and districts on the National Register of Historic Places in Jackson County, Mississippi, United States. Latitude and longitude coordinates are provided for many National Register properties and districts; these locations may be seen together in a map.

There are 69 properties and districts listed on the National Register in the county. Another 7 properties were once listed but have been removed.

This National Park Service list is complete through NPS recent listings posted October 23, 2026.

== Current listings ==
| | Name on the Register | Image | Date listed | Location | City or town | Description |
|---|---|---|---|---|---|---|
| 1 | Applestreet Site (22Ja530) | | 1985-09-12 = (#85002200) | Address restricted | Gautier | Prehistoric village site |
| 2 | Back Bay of Biloxi Shipwreck Site | Back Bay of Biloxi Shipwreck Site | April 22, 1999 (#99000476) | Address restricted | Ocean Springs | |
| 3 | Bellevue | Bellevue | December 12, 2002 (#02001498) | 3401 Beach Boulevard; 30°20′41″N 88°31′41″W | Pascagoula | Constructed circa 1850, private residence |
| 4 | Bertuccini House and Barbershop | Bertuccini House and Barbershop | June 9, 1987 (#87000598) | 619-619A Washington Avenue; 30°24′40″N 88°49′40″W | Ocean Springs | Constructed circa 1906-1909, private residence and office |
| 5 | Capt. Willie Bodden House | Capt. Willie Bodden House | December 20, 1991 (#91001783) | 4002 Pine Street; 30°22′23″N 88°33′20″W | Pascagoula | Constructed circa 1910, private residence |
| 6 | Anna C. Brash House | Anna C. Brash House | December 20, 1991 (#91001784) | 802 Buena Vista Street; 30°20′47″N 88°33′02″W | Pascagoula | Constructed circa 1900, private residence |
| 7 | Building at 707 Krebs Avenue | Building at 707 Krebs Avenue | January 27, 2021 (#100006109) | 707 Krebs Ave. 30°22′05″N 88°33′27″W | Pascagoula | |
| 8 | Carter-Callaway House | Carter-Callaway House | April 20, 1987 (#87000596) | 916 State Street; 30°24′49″N 88°49′26″W | Ocean Springs | Constructed 1906-07, residence |
| 9 | Captain F. L. Clinton House | Captain F. L. Clinton House | December 20, 1991 (#91001786) | 903 Tucker Street; 30°21′47″N 88°33′18″W | Pascagoula | Constructed circa 1906, residence |
| 10 | Cochran-Cassanova House | | April 20, 1987 (#87000595) | 900 Robinson Street; 30°24′53″N 88°49′43″W | Ocean Springs | Constructed circa 1880, no longer in existence as of 2009 |
| 11 | Colle Company Housing | Colle Company Housing | December 20, 1991 (#91001788) | 3611 Frederic Street; 30°22′12″N 88°33′38″W | Pascagoula | Constructed circa 1895 as company housing |
| 12 | Captain Herman H. Colle, Sr., House | Captain Herman H. Colle, Sr., House | December 20, 1991 (#91001787) | 410 Live Oak Street; 30°22′13″N 88°33′39″W | Pascagoula | Constructed circa 1880 |
| 13 | Cudabac-Gantt House | Cudabac-Gantt House | July 24, 1990 (#90001082) | 4836 Main Street; 30°24′42″N 88°32′20″W | Moss Point | Constructed circa 1875 |
| 14 | A. F. Dantzler House | A. F. Dantzler House | March 26, 1987 (#87000504) | 5005 Griffin Street; 30°24′46″N 88°33′29″W | Moss Point | Constructed in 1906 |
| 15 | DeGroote Folk House | | May 4, 1982 (#82003103) | Northeast of Hurley off Mississippi Highway 613; 30°40′33″N 88°30′17″W | Hurley | Constructed circa 1880 |
| 16 | DeJean House | DeJean House | February 25, 1993 (#93000082) | 3603 Frederic Street; 30°22′11″N 88°33′38″W | Pascagoula | Constructed in 1906 |
| 17 | Evergreen Cemetery | Evergreen Cemetery | July 14, 2020 (#100004506) | 1200 Sunset Ave. 30°25′11″N 88°49′22″W | Ocean Springs | |
| 18 | Mayor Ebb Ford House | Mayor Ebb Ford House | December 20, 1991 (#91001791) | 3434 Pascagoula Street; 30°22′06″N 88°33′22″W | Pascagoula | Constructed circa 1900 |
| 19 | George Frentz House | George Frentz House | December 20, 1991 (#91001792) | 503 Morgan Street; 30°22′24″N 88°33′32″W | Pascagoula | Constructed circa 1879 |
| 20 | Front Street Historic District | Front Street Historic District | May 17, 1984 (#84002224) | 2810, 2816, 2905, 2914, and 2916 Front St. 30°21′46″N 88°33′47″W | Pascagoula | |
| 21 | Adam Gautier House | Adam Gautier House | December 20, 1991 (#91001793) | 4418 Cedar Street; 30°22′38″N 88°33′32″W | Pascagoula | Constructed circa 1905 |
| 22 | Eugene Gautier House | Eugene Gautier House | December 20, 1991 (#91001794) | 3803 Willow Street; 30°22′19″N 88°33′15″W | Pascagoula | Constructed circa 1906 |
| 23 | Walter Gautier House | Walter Gautier House | December 20, 1991 (#91001795) | 3012 Canty Street; 30°21′53″N 88°33′28″W | Pascagoula | Constructed circa 1882 |
| 24 | Gautier Beachfront Historic District | | May 15, 2013 (#13000302) | Roughly bounded by Pascagoula Bay, Graveline Rd. & S. branch of Bayou Pierre; 30°22′09″N 88°37′46″W | Gautier | |
| 25 | Gautier School | Gautier School | November 14, 2012 (#12000922) | 505 Magnolia Tree Dr. 30°23′04″N 88°37′00″W | Gautier | |
| 26 | Graveline Mound Site (22JK503) | Graveline Mound Site (22JK503) | July 2, 1987 (#87001109) | Address restricted | Gautier | Prehistoric funerary, 499-0 AD |
| 27 | Griffin House | Griffin House | July 7, 1983 (#83000955) | 100 Griffin Street; 30°25′17″N 88°33′30″W | Moss Point | Constructed circa 1850, residence |
| 28 | W.C. & Elaine Gryder House | | June 15, 2026 (#100013127) | 1212 Iola Road; 30°25′03″N 88°50′07″W | Ocean Springs | |
| 29 | Hansen-Dickey House | | April 20, 1987 (#87000593) | 108 Shearwater Drive; 30°24′04″N 88°49′15″W | Ocean Springs | Destroyed by Hurricane Katrina in August 2005 |
| 30 | Lemuel D. Herrick House | Lemuel D. Herrick House | December 20, 1991 (#91001796) | 2503 Pascagoula Street; 30°21′38″N 88°33′20″W | Pascagoula | Constructed in 1899 |
| 31 | House at 1112 Bowen Avenue | House at 1112 Bowen Avenue | April 20, 1987 (#87000600) | 1112 Bowen Avenue; 30°24′41″N 88°49′33″W | Ocean Springs | Constructed circa 1890 |
| 32 | House at 1410 Bowen Avenue | House at 1410 Bowen Avenue | April 20, 1987 (#87000599) | 1410 Bowen Avenue; 30°24′08″N 88°49′21″W | Ocean Springs | Constructed circa 1900 |
| 33 | William Hughes House | William Hughes House | October 21, 1993 (#93001137) | 2425 Pascagoula Street; 30°21′36″N 88°33′20″W | Pascagoula | Constructed in 1899 |
| 34 | Indian Springs Historic District | Indian Springs Historic District | April 20, 1987 (#87000587) | Iberville St., Church St., and Washington Ave., N. 30°25′03″N 88°49′41″W | Ocean Springs | |
| 35 | International Ship Building Company | | November 30, 2011 (#11000869) | Roughly bounded by Columbus Dr., Yazoo Lake, Garfield, Monroe, & Gen. Lee Sts. & Wright, Lafayette, & McKinley Aves. 30°21′09″N 88°33′25″W | Pascagoula | |
| 36 | Thomas Isaac Keys House | | April 20, 1987 (#87000592) | 1017 DeSoto Avenue; 30°24′47″N 88°49′33″W | Ocean Springs | Constructed circa 1911, demolished circa 2007 |
| 37 | Agnes V. Krebs House | Agnes V. Krebs House | December 20, 1991 (#91001799) | 803 Buena Vista Street; 30°20′48″N 88°33′04″W | Pascagoula | Constructed in 1885 |
| 38 | James Krebs House | James Krebs House | December 20, 1991 (#91001800) | 4702 River Road; 30°22′50″N 88°32′43″W | Pascagoula | Constructed circa 1905 |
| 39 | Krebsville Historic District | Krebsville Historic District | December 20, 1991 (#91001801) | 803, 809, and 811 Kell Ave., 611, 703, 706, 707, 710, and 802 Mill Rd., and 4011, 4013, 4205, and 4215 Pine St.; Roughly bounded by Lake, Cedar, Pine & Market Sts., Laurel & Denny Aves. 30°22′31″N 88°33′22″W | Pascagoula | Second set of addresses is from a boundary extension on 5/22/13 |
| 40 | Leonard Levin House | Leonard Levin House | December 20, 1991 (#91001802) | 1403 Washington Avenue; 30°20′42″N 88°33′02″W | Pascagoula | Constructed circa 1885 |
| 41 | Colonel Alfred E. Lewis House | Colonel Alfred E. Lewis House | October 16, 1980 (#80002251) | 1901 Watersedge Drive; 30°21′40″N 88°38′27″W | Gautier | Constructed circa 1845 |
| 42 | Louisville and Nashville Railroad Depot | Louisville and Nashville Railroad Depot | August 27, 1974 (#74001063) | Railroad Avenue at Saint Ferol Street; 30°22′04″N 88°33′34″W | Pascagoula | Constructed in 1904 |
| 43 | Louisville and Nashville Railroad Depot at Ocean Springs | Louisville and Nashville Railroad Depot at Ocean Springs | December 31, 1979 (#79001316) | 1000 Washington Avenue; 30°24′55″N 88°49′37″W | Ocean Springs | Constructed in 1907. Used as Visitor Center. |
| 44 | Lover's Lane Historic District | Lover's Lane Historic District | June 9, 1987 (#87000584) | Lover's Lane; 30°24′57″N 88°50′33″W | Ocean Springs | In the 1920s-1930s, a social custom of local youths was to utilize the secluded area as a rendezvous for romantic interludes, hence the name Lover's Lane. |
| 45 | Marble Springs Historic District | Marble Springs Historic District | April 20, 1987 (#87000586) | Along Iberville Ave., between Washington Ave., N. and Sunset Ave. 30°25′06″N 88°49′31″W | Ocean Springs | |
| 46 | Moss Point Historic District | Moss Point Historic District | August 1, 2012 (#12000461) | Roughly bounded by Dantzler, Davis, Griffin, Main, Payne, & Weems Sts., Bellview, Ely, McInnis, Torres, & Welch Aves. 30°24′45″N 88°32′32″W | Moss Point | |
| 47 | Nelson Tenement | | December 20, 1991 (#91001804) | 3615 Pine Street; 30°22′13″N 88°33′22″W | Pascagoula | Constructed circa 1895; demolished as of 2012 |
| 48 | John C. Nelson House | John C. Nelson House | December 20, 1991 (#91001803) | 2434 Pascagoula Street; 30°21′36″N 88°33′18″W | Pascagoula | Constructed circa 1899 |
| 49 | O'Keefe-Clark Boarding House | O'Keefe-Clark Boarding House | April 20, 1987 (#87000591) | 2122 Government Street; 30°24′43″N 88°48′48″W | Ocean Springs | Constructed circa 1850 |
| 50 | Ocean Springs Community Center | Ocean Springs Community Center | August 24, 1989 (#89001092) | Washington Avenue; 30°24′38″N 88°49′39″W | Ocean Springs | Constructed 1945-48. Contains original murals by Walter Anderson. |
| 51 | Old Farmers and Merchants State Bank | Old Farmers and Merchants State Bank | April 20, 1987 (#87000590) | 998 Washington Avenue; 30°24′49″N 88°49′40″W | Ocean Springs | Constructed in 1913 |
| 52 | Old Ocean Springs High School | Old Ocean Springs High School | August 2, 1990 (#87000589) | Magnolia and Government Streets; 30°24′43″N 88°49′13″W | Ocean Springs | Constructed 1927, serves as Mary C. O'Keefe Cultural Center |
| 53 | Old Ocean Springs Historic District | | October 7, 1987 (#87000597) | Roughly bounded by Porter and Dewey Aves., Front Beach Dr., Martin Ave., Cleveland St., and Rayburn Ave.; roughly bounded by L & N RR., Calhoun St., 1st, Ocean, Magnolia & Ward Aves. 30°24′21″N 88°49′15″W | Ocean Springs | Boundary increase and decrease on 2014-06-02 |
| 54 | Old Pascagoula High School | Old Pascagoula High School | April 6, 2000 (#00000330) | 2903 Pascagoula Street; 30°21′44″N 88°33′23″W | Pascagoula | Constructed 1939, closed 1997, converted into apartments |
| 55 | Old Spanish Fort | Old Spanish Fort | September 3, 1971 (#71000452) | 200 Fort Street; 30°22′48″N 88°33′29″W | Pascagoula | Constructed circa 1721 |
| 56 | Lena Olsen House | Lena Olsen House | December 20, 1991 (#91001805) | 706 Buena Vista Street; 30°20′44″N 88°33′01″W | Pascagoula | Constructed circa 1891 |
| 57 | Orange Avenue Historic District | Orange Avenue Historic District | August 14, 2001 (#01000827) | Roughly bounded by Live Oak and Orange Aves. and Frederic and Magnolia Sts.; 600 & 700 blk. of Live Oak St. 30°22′09″N 88°33′34″W | Pascagoula | Boundary increase September 18, 2013 |
| 58 | Pascagoula Central Fire Station No. 1 | Pascagoula Central Fire Station No. 1 | December 8, 1978 (#78001604) | 623 Delmas Avenue; 30°22′01″N 88°33′30″W | Pascagoula | Constructed in 1924 |
| 59 | Pascagoula Street Railroad and Power Company | Pascagoula Street Railroad and Power Company | December 20, 1991 (#91001806) | 3708 Pascagoula Street; 30°22′18″N 88°33′13″W | Pascagoula | Constructed circa 1904 |
| 60 | Round Island Lighthouse | Round Island Lighthouse | October 9, 1986 (#86002815) | East end of U.S. Route 90 bridge 30°22′14″N 88°33′21″W | Pascagoula | Erected 1859 on the southwestern corner of Round Island, toppled by Hurricanes Georges and Katrina. Remnants moved inland for restoration along U.S. Route 90 in Pascagoula. |
| 61 | Saint John's Episcopal Church | Saint John's Episcopal Church | April 20, 1987 (#87000588) | Northwestern corner of Rayburn and Porter Avenues; 30°24′41″N 88°49′53″W | Ocean Springs | Constructed in 1892 |
| 62 | St. Mary's By the River | St. Mary's By the River | May 2, 1991 (#91000542) | 3855 River Road; 30°23′47″N 88°33′10″W | Moss Point | Constructed circa 1925 |
| 63 | Scranton Historic District | | October 6, 2021 (#100007019) | Roughly bounded by Krebs Ave., Pascagoula St., Convent Ave., and Frederic St. 30°22′01″N 88°33′33″W | Pascagoula | |
| 64 | Shearwater Historic District | | August 24, 1989 (#87000585) | Shearwater Dr. 30°24′11″N 88°49′17″W | Ocean Springs | |
| 65 | Sullivan-Charnley Historic District | | April 20, 1987 (#87000583) | Shearwater Dr. and Holcomb Boulevard; 30°23′50″N 88°48′37″W | Ocean Springs | |
| 66 | Dr. Joseph A. Tabor House | Dr. Joseph A. Tabor House | December 20, 1991 (#91001808) | 520 Live Oak Street; 30°22′11″N 88°33′30″W | Pascagoula | Constructed circa 1906 |
| 67 | George Thompson House | George Thompson House | December 20, 1991 (#91001809) | 523 Orange Street; 30°22′10″N 88°33′32″W | Pascagoula | Constructed circa 1890 |
| 68 | Vancleave Cottage | Vancleave Cottage | April 20, 1987 (#87000582) | 1302 Government Street; 30°24′44″N 88°49′27″W | Ocean Springs | Constructed circa 1900 |
| 69 | Laura Westphal House | Laura Westphal House | December 20, 1991 (#91001810) | 711 Krebs Street; 30°22′05″N 88°33′25″W | Pascagoula | Constructed circa 1896 |

=== Former listings ===
| | Name on the Register | Image | Date listed | Date removed | Location | City or town | Description |
|---|---|---|---|---|---|---|---|
| 1 | Clare T. Clark House | | December 20, 1991 (#91001785) | July 16, 2008 | 1709 Beach Boulevard | Pascagoula | Destroyed by Hurricane Katrina in August 2005 |
| 2 | Cottage by the Sea Tavern | | December 20, 1991 (#91001789) | July 16, 2008 | 1205 Beach Boulevard | Pascagoula | Destroyed by Hurricane Katrina in August 2005 |
| 3 | R. A. Farnsworth Summer House | | December 20, 1991 (#91001790) | July 16, 2008 | 901 Beach Boulevard | Pascagoula | Destroyed by Hurricane Katrina in August 2005 |
| 4 | Halstead Place | | April 20, 1987 (#87000594) | July 16, 2008 | East Beach Drive | Ocean Springs | Destroyed by Hurricane Katrina in August 2005 |
| 5 | Edgar W. Hull House | | December 20, 1991 (#91001797) | July 16, 2008 | 2903 Beach Boulevard | Pascagoula | Destroyed by Hurricane Katrina in August 2005 |
| 6 | Georgia P. Kinne House | | December 20, 1991 (#91001798) | July 16, 2008 | 1101 Beach Boulevard | Pascagoula | Destroyed by Hurricane Katrina in August 2005 |
| 7 | Randall's Tavern | | December 20, 1991 (#91001807) | July 16, 2008 | 919 Beach Boulevard | Pascagoula | Destroyed by Hurricane Katrina in August 2005 |

== See also ==
- List of National Historic Landmarks in Mississippi
- National Register of Historic Places listings in Mississippi
