= C. H. Lindsley =

American architect (1894–1969)

Claude H. Lindsley (1894 - 1969) was an American architect based in Mississippi.

== Early life ==
Claude H. Lindsley was born in Lincoln County, Mississippi in 1894.

== Career ==
During his career, he worked primarily in Mississippi, with offices in Jackson and Ocean Springs. He also worked in Houston, Texas and Washington, D.C.

He designed 225 E. Capitol Street, built in 1928 in the Smith Park Architectural District, the Hugh Lawson White Mansion where former Governor of Mississippi Hugh L. White lived in Columbia, Mississippi (a contributing property to Keys Hill Historic District), and Threefoot Building (1929) in Meridian, Mississippi. He also designed several buildings at Ellisville State School. Several buildings he designed are listed on the National Register of Historic Places (NRHP).

== Later life and death ==
Lindsley died in 1969 in Jackson, Mississippi. He is buried in Lakewood Cemetery.

== Work ==
- Central High School (1923) in Jackson, a Mississippi Landmark
- Hugh White Mansion in Columbia (1925)
- Lorena Duling School (1927) at 622 Duling Avenue in Jackson, a city landmark, Mississippi Landmark, and listed on the NRHP
- Two buildings at Belhaven College in Jackson (1927)
- Sacred Heart Catholic Church (1928) in Canton
- Crystal Springs High School (1928) in Crystal Springs
- Threefoot Building (1929) NRHP listed
- Robert E. Lee Hotel (1930) in Jackson. Closed to avoid having to integrate in 1964. Bought by the state in 1969. Later became a Mental Health Department building.
- Hinds County Courthouse (1930) on Pascagoula Street in Jackson, NRHP listed
- Alcorn State buildings
- Delta State buildings
- Mississippi University for Women buildings
- Mississippi State buildings
- Fulton Chapel at Ole Miss
- Pascagoula High School, section, in partnership with Ft. Worth architect Wyatt C. Hedrick
- Tower Building (Standard Life building) in Jackson
- First National Bank in Ocean Springs, his last known project
- Bellevue Court Apartments at 950 North Street in Jackson. NRHP listed
- Gautier School expansion and additional buildings at 505 Magnolia Tree Drive in Gautier, Mississippi. NRHP listed
- Contributing property to the Smith Park Architectural District (Boundary Increase II) at 308 E. Pearl Street in Jackson
- Contributing property to the Smith Park Architectural District (Boundary Increase) at 225 East Capitol Street in Jackson
- Washington County Courthouse at 110 E. Main in Brenham, Texas as Hendrick & Lindsley Inc.
- Hotel Lamar in Yazoo, Mississippi a Mississippi Landmark
