= Tchefuncte =

Tchefuncte may refer to:

- Tchefuncte site
- Tchefuncte River
- Tchefuncte River Range Lights
