= Little Cumberland Island Light =

Lighthouse in Georgia, U.S.

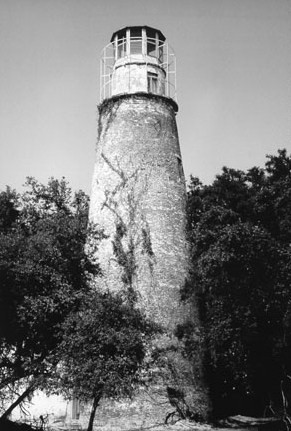
- Little Cumberland Island Lighthouse
- Location: Northern end of Little Cumberland Island, Georgia
- Coordinates: 30°58′34″N 81°24′47″W

Tower
- Constructed: 1838
- Foundation: Brick
- Construction: Brick
- Height: 60 feet (18 m)
- Shape: conical
- Markings: White tower with black lantern
- Heritage: National Register of Historic Places listed place

Light
- First lit: 1838
- Deactivated: 1915
- Focal height: 71 feet (22 m)
- Lens: 1838: 14 Lewis lamps 1857: Third-order Fresnel lens
- Range: 14 nautical miles (26 km; 16 mi)
- Characteristic: Fixed white
- Little Cumberland Island Lighthouse
- U.S. National Register of Historic Places
- NRHP reference No.: 89001407
- Added to NRHP: August 8, 1989

The Little Cumberland Island Lighthouse is a privately owned lighthouse in Georgia, United States, on the north end of Little Cumberland Island adjacent to main Cumberland Island, in Camden County on the southeast coast of Georgia.

When in service the light marked the entrance to St. Andrew Sound and the Satilla River. It also marked a shoal that extends about 6 nautical miles (11 km; 6.9 mi) south-southeasterly of the light.

== History ==
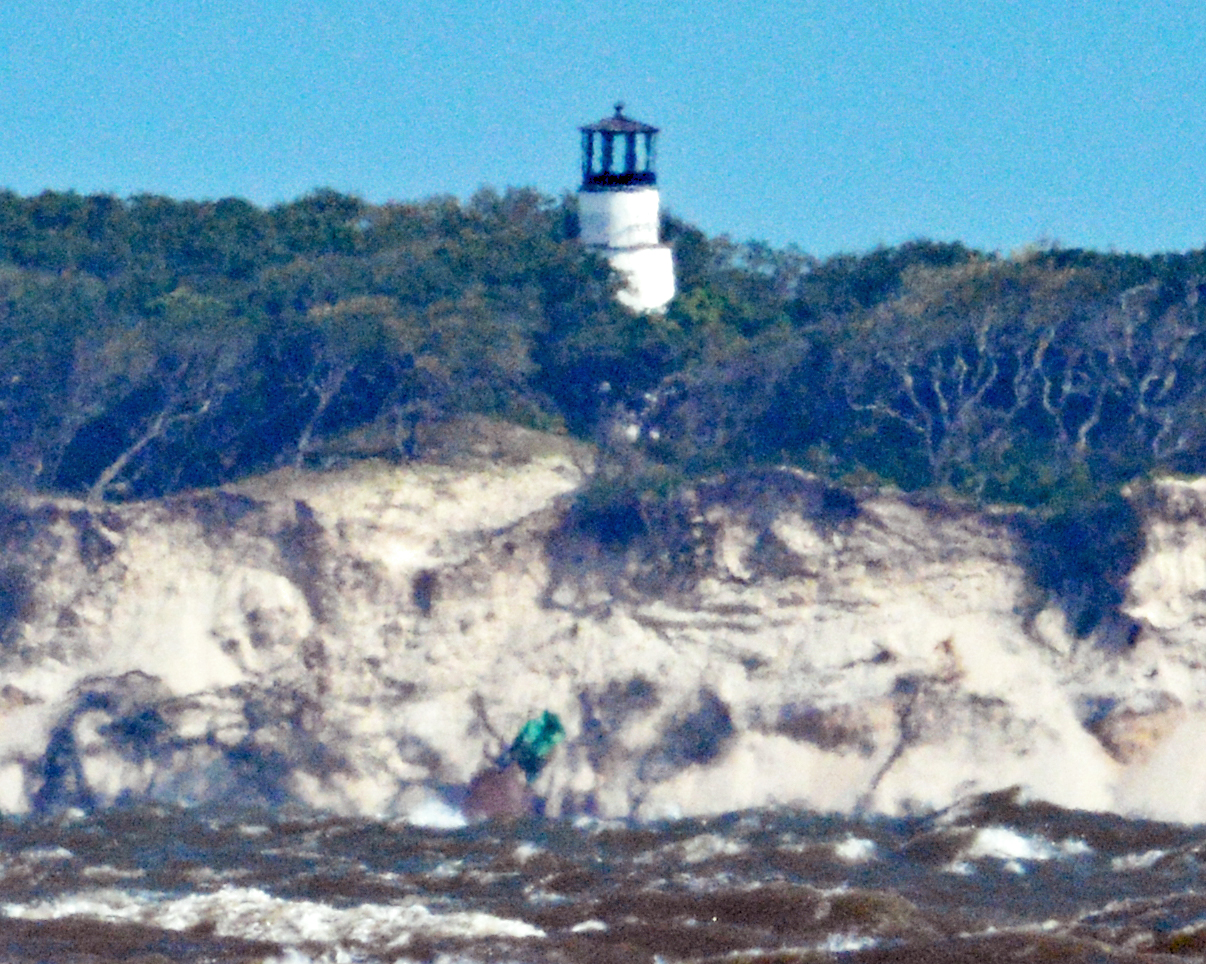
The lighthouse as seen from Jekyll Island

The 60-foot (18 m) Little Cumberland Island Lighthouse was designed by Winslow Lewis and built in 1838. It had fourteen Lewis lamps generating a fixed light, which distinguished it from the older tower to the south that had a revolving light. The lantern room received its third-order Fresnel lens, manufactured in France by Henri LePaute, in 1857. The new light had a range of 14 nautical miles (26 km; 16 mi) with a focal height of 71 feet (22 m) asl. In 1874, a brick wall was built around the lighthouse to protect it from the encroaching sea.

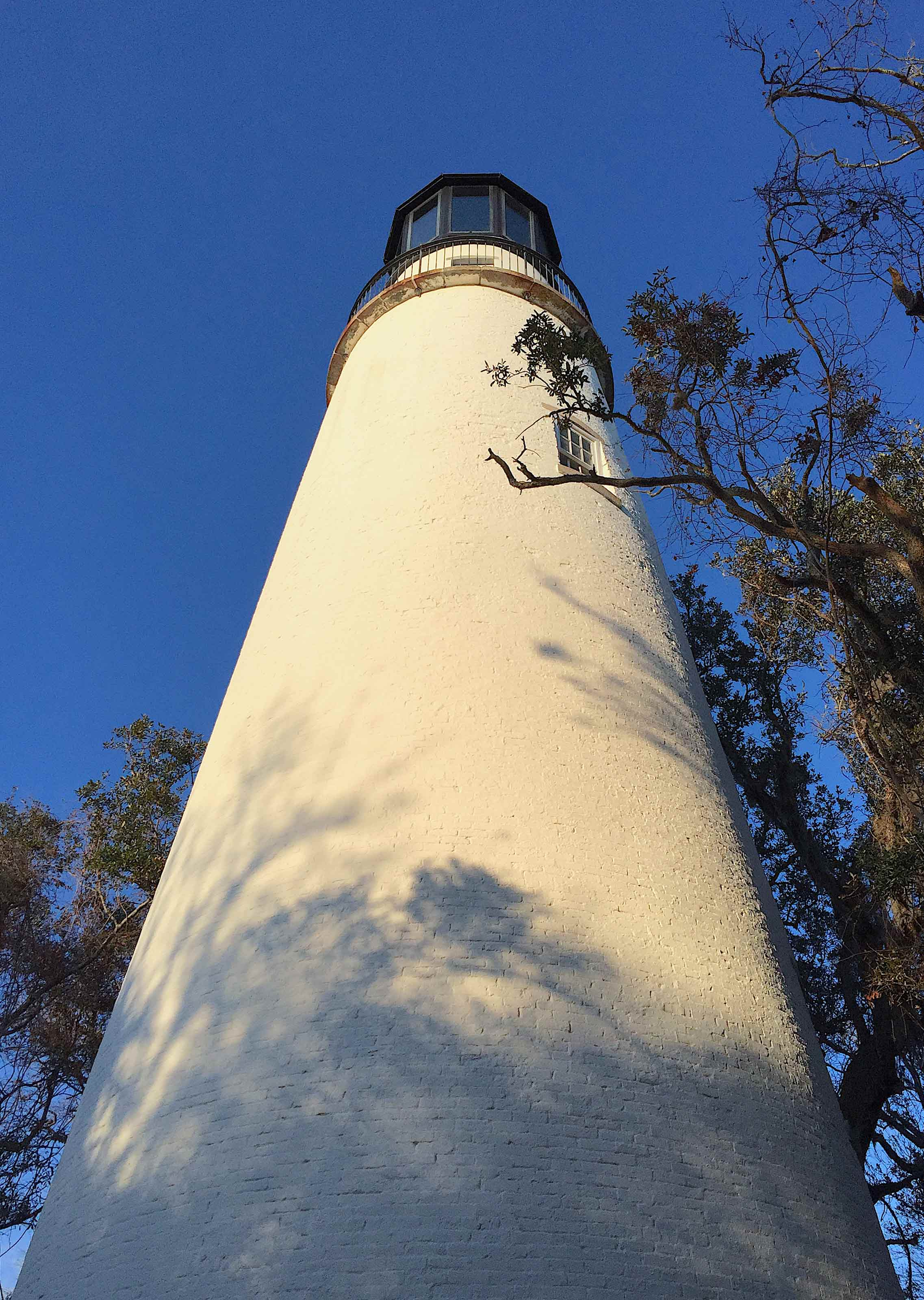
Photograph of the Little Cumberland Island lighthouse after its restoration in 2016.

The lighthouse was in service until 1915 when it was deactivated. The keeper's house and all other light station buildings, are long since gone; However, thanks to dedicated owners, the lighthouse has been restored and remains in pristine condition. The lighthouse was renovated by the owners from 1994 to 1998 and again in 2016. The lighthouse keeper's house and surrounding property is privately owned and is not open to the public. A large dune protects the lighthouse from the ocean, and as a result, the tower is now barely visible from the water.

== Designation ==
The lighthouse is on the National Register of Historic Places, No. 89001407. It was designated on August 8, 1989.

The Little Cumberland Island Light is private property and access is not permitted without permission from the owner.

== See also ==
- National Register of Historic Places listings in Camden County, Georgia
