= Mississippi Governor's Mansion =

Historic house in Mississippi, United States

- U.S. National Register of Historic Places
- U.S. National Historic Landmark
- U.S. Historic district – Contributing property
- Mississippi Landmark
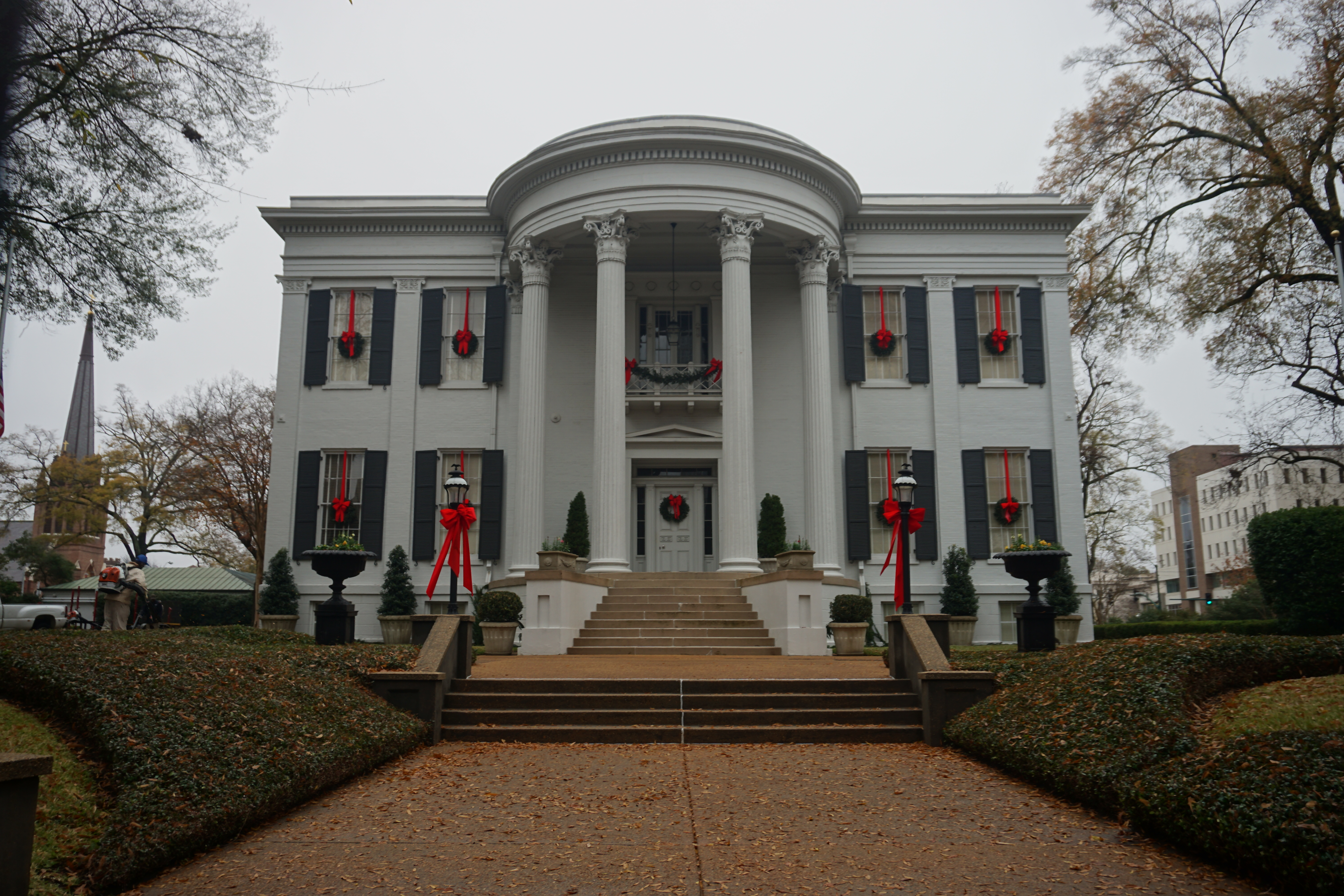

- Location within Mississippi Location within the United States
- Location: 300 East Capitol Street, Jackson, Mississippi
- Coordinates: 32°17′59.77″N 90°11′0.01″W
- Area: 2.4 acres (0.97 ha)
- Built: 1839
- Architect: William Nichols, William S. Hull
- Architectural style: Greek Revival
- Part of: Smith Park Architectural District (ID76001097)
- NRHP reference No.: 69000085
- USMS No.: 049-JAC-0013-NHL-ML

Significant dates
- Added to NRHP: November 25, 1969
- Designated NHL: April 24, 1975
- Designated CP: April 23, 1976
- Designated USMS: March 5, 1986

The Mississippi Governor's Mansion is the official residence of the governor of Mississippi, who is currently Tate Reeves. It is located in downtown Jackson, Mississippi, south of the Mississippi State Capitol, at the south end of Smith Park. Completed in 1841 to a design by state architect William Nichols, it is the second-oldest governor's residence in active use in the nation, and a prominent example of Greek Revival architecture. It was designated a National Historic Landmark in 1975, and was declared a Mississippi Landmark in 1985.

== Description ==
The Mississippi Governor's Mansion is located three blocks south of the Mississippi State Capitol, on 2.4 acres (0.97 ha) that take up an entire city block, bounded by East Amite, North Congress, East Capitol, and North West Streets. Its formal entrance is oriented south towards East Capitol Street, while a secondary entrance faces north toward Smith Park, Jackson's oldest public park, which occupies the next city block to the north. It is a two-story masonry structure painted white, basically rectangular in plan. Its front facade is five bays wide, each bay articulated by pilasters with scrolled capitals; bays on the side elevations are separated by doubled pilasters. The center bay is larger and is fronted by a two-story half-round portico supported by four columns. A full entablature encircles the building, ending in a dentillated cornice below the roof line. The rear entrance, set at the back of a modern two-story ell, is sheltered by a single-story Greek temple portico with four columns, entablature, and gabled pediment.

The interior of the mansion's original main block contains many original features, although there are also elements that have been reproduced, a product of restoration work after incompatible changes were made to the building in the 19th and 20th centuries. The main entrance leads into an octagonal vestibule with sculpture niches in four walls, entrances to parlors on the sides, and passage to the main stair at the back. The modern wing at the back of the house provides amenities for the governor's family and serves as its living quarters.

== History ==
The mansion was designed by William Nichols, then in his capacity as state architect. Nichols was at the same time supervising the construction of what is now the Old Mississippi State Capitol. Construction was begun in 1839 and completed in 1841; its first occupant was Governor Tilghman Tucker in 1842. It has been used continuously since then as the governor's residence, except during periods of renovation; the only older governor's residence of longer use is that of Virginia.

During the 1860s, the building was fitted with gas lighting, which resulted in damage to woodwork and plasterwork, and some of its wooden fireplace surrounds were replaced by marble ones. In the early 20th century, there was talk of replacing the mansion, but the state decided instead to renovate and enlarge the structure. A two-story addition was made to the rear in 1908–09, plumbing was added to the main block, and the main stair was rebuilt to accommodate access to the addition. In the 1970s, it again needed major refurbishment, owing in part to inadequate support for the 1908 addition. It was torn down, and a new and larger steel-frame addition was made. The interior of the main block underwent some restoration to bring it back to its original early 19th-century appearance, including the removal of visible pipes, while also adding modern conveniences such as air conditioning.

== Visiting ==
The mansion is open for free guided tours most Tuesday through Friday mornings, unless there are official functions or other uses of the building scheduled. Certain types of educational non-profit organizations may hold events at the mansion; a fee is charged.

== See also ==
- List of National Historic Landmarks in Mississippi
- National Register of Historic Places listings in Hinds County, Mississippi
