= Horn Island Light =

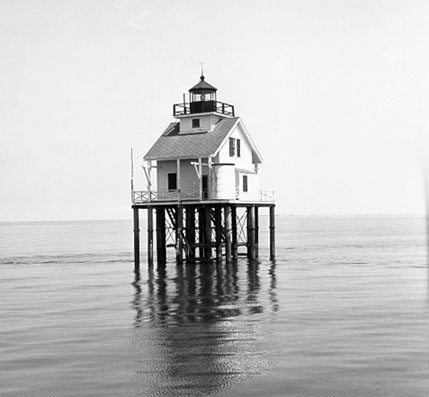
- the third Horn Island Light (USCG)
- Location: originally on east tip of Horn Island; later north of the west end of Petit Bois Island in the Mississippi Sound
- Coordinates: 30.224°N 88.485°W (final light)

Tower
- Constructed: 1874
- Height: 47 ft (14 m)
- Shape: house

Light
- First lit: 1874 (first tower); 1908 (final tower)
- Deactivated: 1961
- Lens: fourth order Fresnel lens
- Characteristic: fixed white

The Horn Island Light (in later years also known as the Petit Bois Light) was a lighthouse in Mississippi originally located at the eastern end of Horn Island. Moved and rebuilt several times, it was deactivated and abandoned in 1961.

== History ==
Horn Island and Petit Bois Island are part of a chain of barrier islands separating the sound from the Gulf of Mexico; the passage between them, the Horn Island Pass, is the most direct route to Pascagoula by water. To guide ships through the pass, the first Horn Island Light was erected in 1874, a wooden house on a screwpile foundation. In what would become a recurring theme it was moved in 1880 due to erosion.

The second light was built on the island in 1887, a square house with dormers and a lantern on the roof. It too was moved in 1900 (the old abandoned light having succumbed to a storm in 1893), and was utterly destroyed by the 1906 Mississippi hurricane, killing keeper Charles Johnsson, his wife, and his daughter. Johnsson had been offered a ride with his family to safety but had refused, citing his duty to keep the beacon lit; his body was found after the storm, but those of his wife and daughter were never recovered.

A new light was not constructed until 1908, and at a new location in the sound at the west end of Petit Bois Island. This light was still officially named the Horn Island Light but due to its location was also called the Petit Bois Light. It was another small house, this time on a platform of piles, equipped with a fourth order Fresnel lens. It was automated in 1951 and discontinued in 1961 in favor of range lights which are still in use.

== See also ==
- List of lighthouses in Mississippi
- List of lighthouses in the United States
