= Smith Park Architectural District =

Historic district in Mississippi, United States

- U.S. National Register of Historic Places
- U.S. Historic district
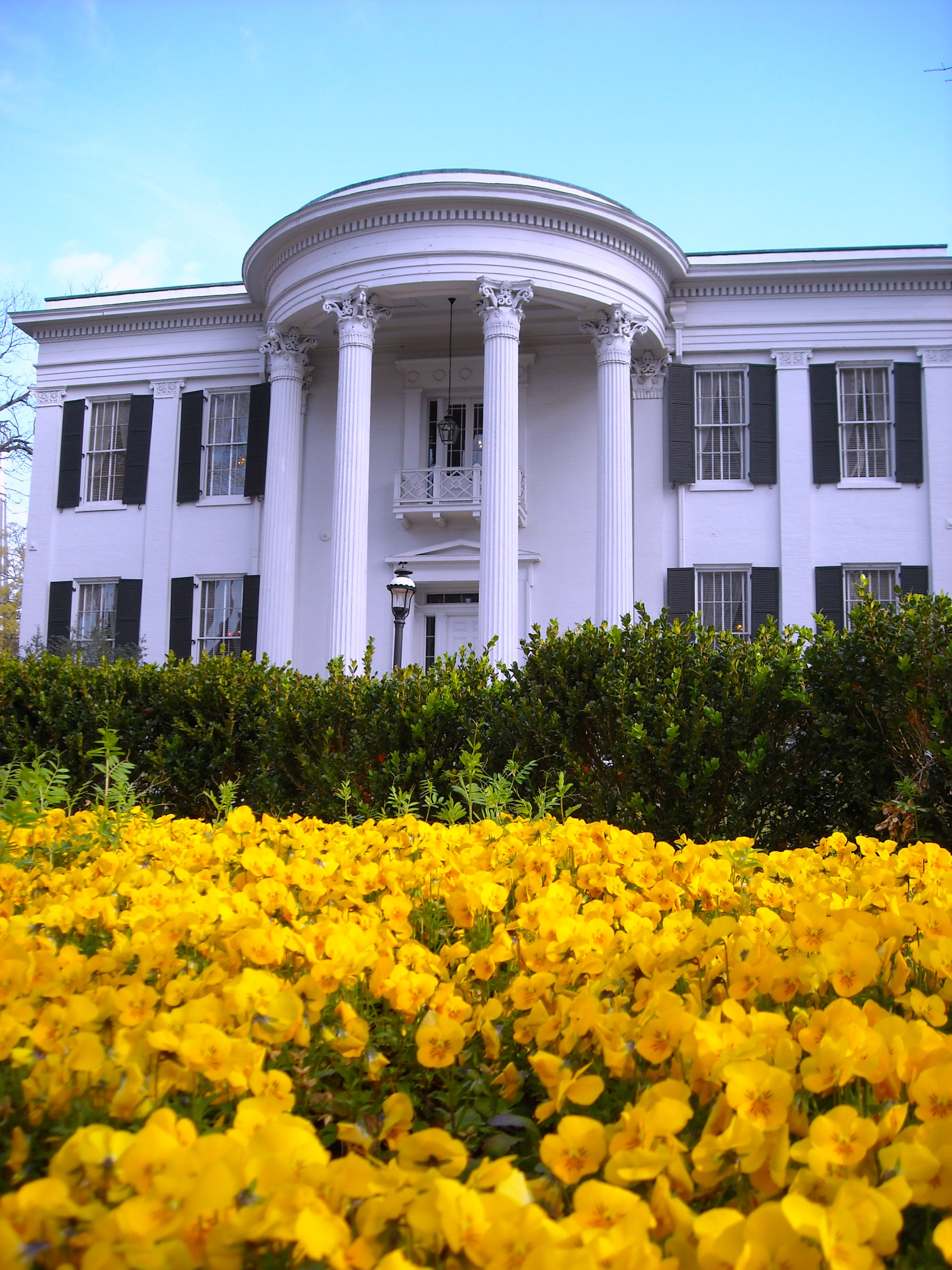
- The Mississippi Governor's Mansion

- Location within Mississippi Location within the United States
- Location: Jackson, Mississippi
- Coordinates: 32°17′54.25″N 90°11′7.1″W
- Area: 20 acres (8.1 ha)
- Architect: C.H. Lindsley
- Architectural style: Art Deco, Late 19th And 20th Century Revivals, Mid 19th Century Revival
- NRHP reference No.: 76001097 (original); 93001152 (increase 1); 04000215 (increase 2); 13001081 (increase 3); 100009440 (increase 4)

Significant dates
- Added to NRHP: April 23, 1976
- Boundary increases: October 29, 1993; March 23, 2004; July 25, 2014; October 16, 2023

The Smith Park Architectural District was listed on the National Register of Historic Places in 1976. It covers an "irregular pattern along N. West and N. Congress Sts. between Capitol St. and State Capitol", in Jackson, Mississippi. The district was increased by a boundary increase on October 29, 1993 which added 225 E. Capitol St., a building built in 1928 that was designed by architect C.H. Lindsley. It was again increased in 2014, including the entire 200 block of East Capitol Street. The centerpieces of the district are Smith Park, the only public square designated when Jackson was platted out in 1822, and the Mississippi Governor's Mansion, which stands facing the park.

== See also ==
- National Register of Historic Places listings in Hinds County, Mississippi
