= Winslow Lewis =

American sea captain, engineer, inventor and contractor (1770–1850)

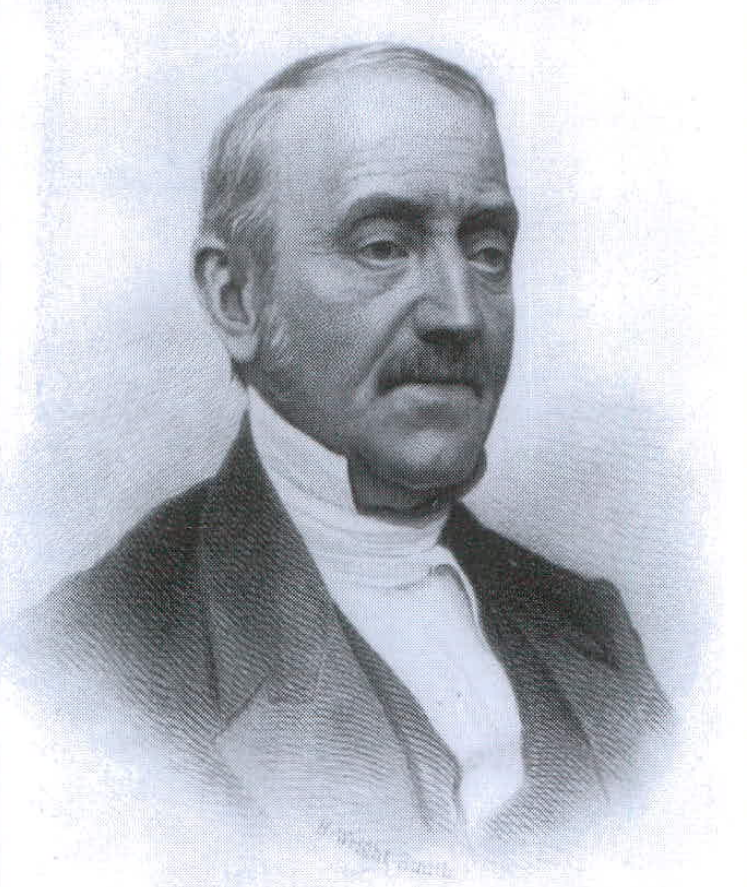
- Born: Nathaniel Winslow Lewis; May 11, 1770; Wellfleet, Barnstable County, Massachusetts Bay Colony
- Died: May 20, 1850 (aged 80); Wellfleet, Massachusetts, U.S.
- Occupations: Sea captain; engineer; inventor; contractor
- Years active: c. 1807–1850
- Relatives: I. W. P. Lewis (nephew)

Winslow Lewis (born Nathaniel Winslow Lewis; May 11, 1770 – May 20, 1850) was a sea captain, engineer, inventor and contractor active in the construction of many American lighthouses during the first half of the nineteenth century.

== Early life ==
Lewis was born on May 11, 1770, in Wellfleet, Barnstable County, Massachusetts Bay Colony.

== Career ==
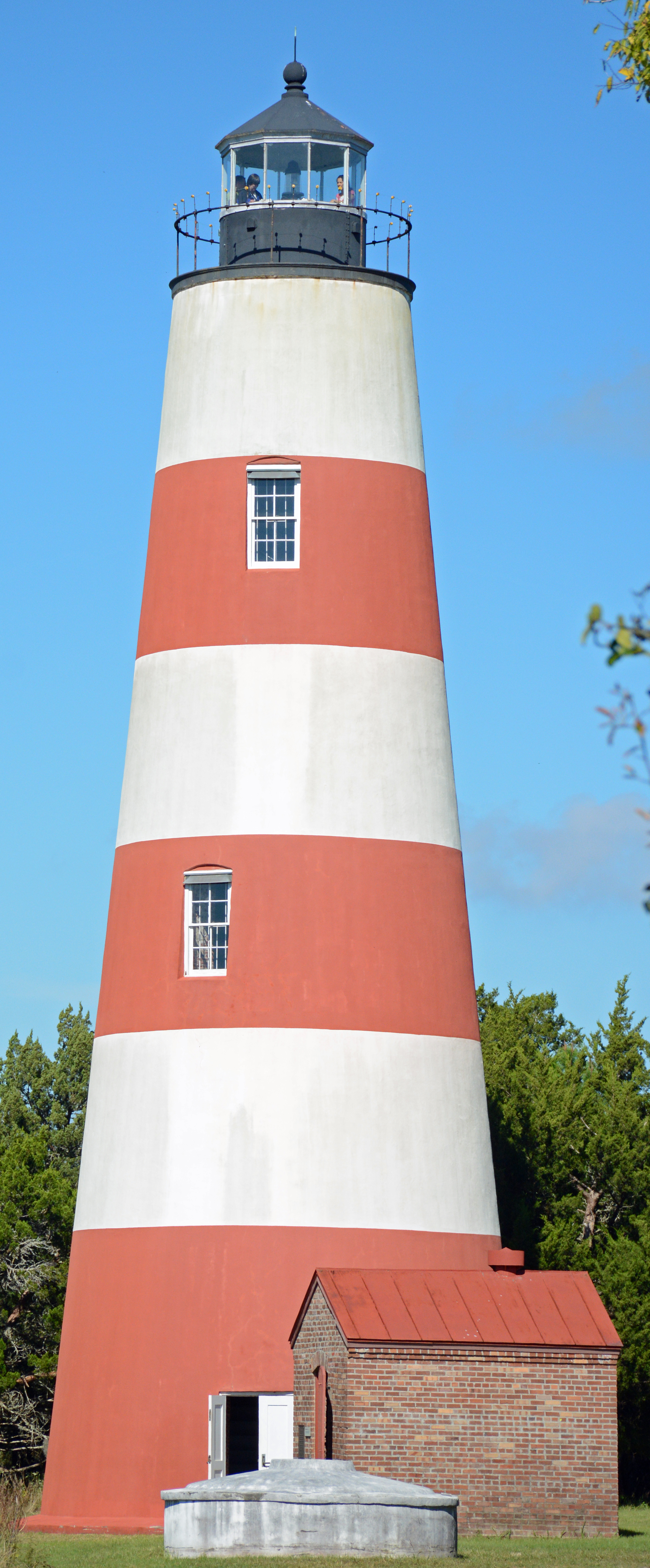
Sapelo Island Light in Georgia, the oldest surviving Lewis lighthouse

He began developing his ideas during the embargo of American shipping during the Napoleonic Wars. He created a new lighting system based on Argand lamps; in 1812 the United States Congress purchased his patent rights for the system. In so doing, it awarded him a contract to equip all American lighthouses with the lamps; the fitting took four years. In 1815 Lewis won another contract with Samuel H. Smith, Commissioner of Revenue, which gave him a monopoly over the provision of winter pressed Spermaceti oil for lighthouses throughout the eastern seaboard. It also allowed him to visit the lighthouses yearly to ensure their smooth operation.

Lewis soon branched out into contracting work, winning bids to build new lighthouses around the country. When Stephen Pleasonton took over the responsibility for these contracts in 1820 and reorganized the Lighthouse Establishment, Lewis apparently continued his oil supply contract. Pleasonton began an alliance with Lewis, who was soon being awarded most lighthouse construction deals in the United States. While demand for the towers was high and funds were short, Pleasonton took great pride in the fact that Lewis was able to complete the work cheaply and rapidly.

Lewis soon had a set of standard plans drawn up to meet demand; these plotted out five different sizes of lighthouses, at 25, 30, 40, 50, and 65 feet high. Many such towers were built; most were made of brick, but a few were constructed of stone. But Lewis knew little about proper engineering practices, and most of the lighthouses were either poorly constructed, or they were too short. Most had to be replaced; only a few survive today.

== Death ==
Little is known of Lewis' later career, but he died in his home town of Wellfleet. His nephew, I. W. P. Lewis, was also a lighthouse builder and engineer.

== See also ==
- Lewis lamp
- Back River Light
- Bodkin Island Light
- Cat Island Light
- Little Cumberland Island Light
- New Presque Isle Light
- Pass Christian Light
- Sapelo Island Light
- Tchefuncte River Range Lights
