= I. W. P. Lewis =

American architect (1808–1855)

- Born: Isaiah William Penn Lewis; 1808; Boston, Massachusetts, U.S.
- Died: October 1855 (aged 46–47); Boston, Massachusetts, U.S.
- Occupations: Lighthouse designer; builder; engineer
- Relatives: Winslow Lewis (uncle)

Isaiah William Penn Lewis (1808 – October 1855) was an American lighthouse designer, builder, and engineer.

== Early life ==
Lewis was born in 1808 in Boston, Massachusetts.

He was a nephew of Winslow Lewis, and was often critical of his uncle's work.

== Career ==
I.W.P. Lewis traveled to Europe to study European lighthouse design, and incorporated the lessons he learned into his work. He built a handful of pile lighthouses, most of which were in the Florida Keys.

In 1843 he made a report to Congress on the lighthouses in the country.

== Death ==
Lewis died in October 1855 in Boston, Massachusetts.
