= Hugh Lawson White Mansion =

Historic house in Mississippi, United States

Coordinates: 31.251811°N 89.814822°W

The Hugh Lawson White Mansion (commonly referred to as the Hugh White Mansion) is the historical home of former Governor of Mississippi Hugh L. White. The mansion is located in Columbia, Mississippi, and is listed as a contributing property to Keys Hill Historic District, which is listed on the National Register of Historic Places.

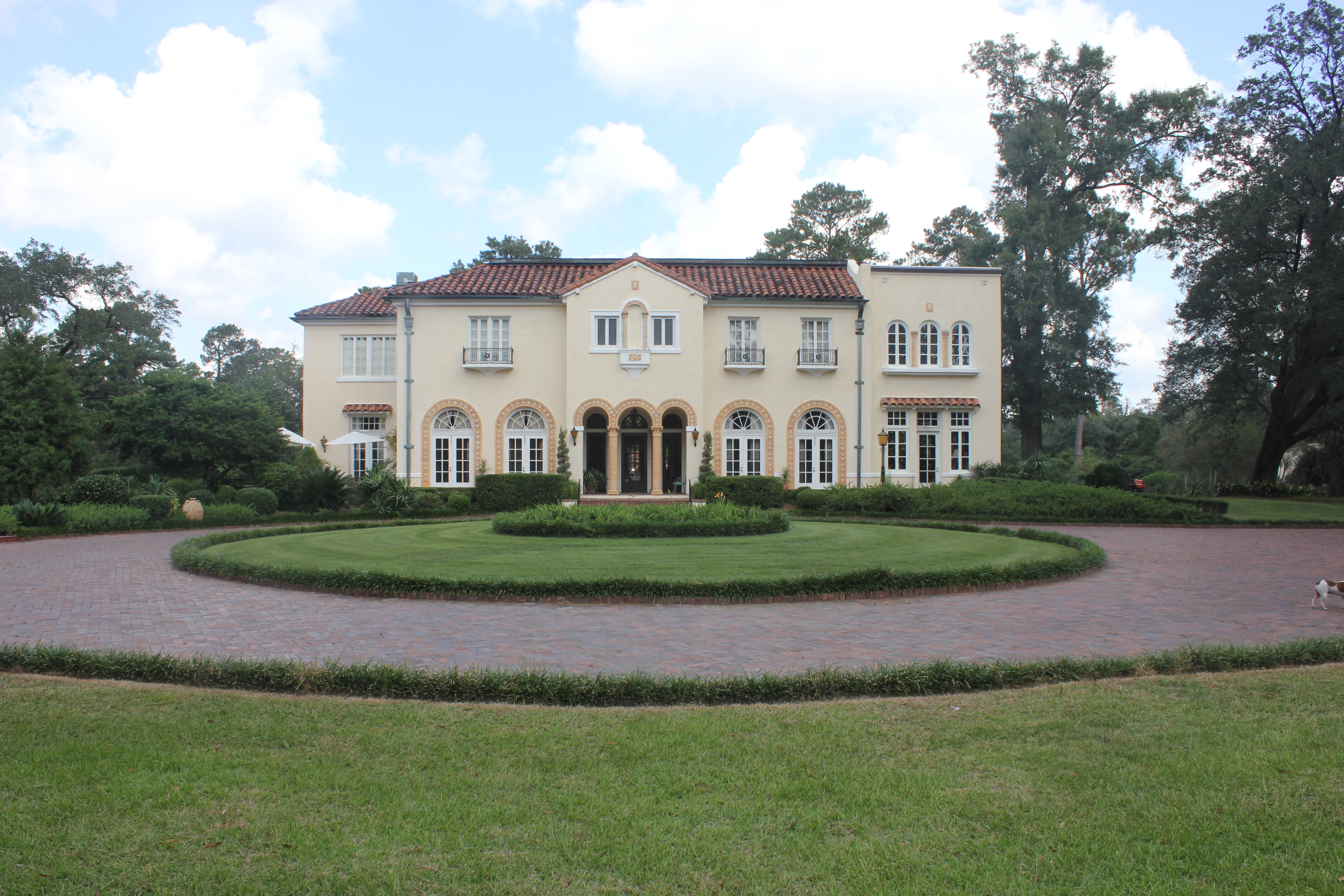
Keys Hill, Governor Hugh White Mansion, Marion County, MS, in 2012.

The mansion is notable as an example of Spanish Colonial Revival Style architecture, as well as for its park-like grounds and specialized gardens. Tours of the mansion and grounds are available by appointment.

== History ==
The mansion, located at One Hugh White Place in Columbia, Mississippi, was designed by Jackson, Mississippi architect C.H. Lindsley. Upon completion in 1926, the mansion was furnished by Marshall Field's of Chicago, Illinois. In 1955, during his second term as Governor of Mississippi, White sold the mansion to W.E. Simmons. Following Simmons' death, the mansion came into the possession of other individuals, but was reacquired by Simmons' son, W.E. Simmons III, in 1986. The Simmons have occupied the mansion since that time.

=== National Register of Historic Places ===
In 1981, a historical homes researcher submitted the Hugh White Mansion, among other nearby homes, as part of the Keys Hill Historic District on the National Register of Historic Places. The submission was accepted in 1982, and the district remains on the register to this day.

== Architecture and grounds ==
In the book Mississippi by Marlo Carter Kirkpatrick, the mansion is described as, "the finest example of Spanish Colonial Revival architecture in the state." In Elmo Howell's book Mississippi Scenes: Notes on Literature and History (page 59), the grounds of the mansions are described:

"The grounds fall off sharply on one side, with a balustraded descent to formal gardens, an arbor and reflecting pool. A good part of the original planting survives: azalea, Cape jasmine, crepe myrtle, and camellia, the Governor's favorite flower."

Howell goes on to tell how White went as far as to employ an expert gardener from Japan who was proficient in the cultivation of camellias.

== Tourism ==
The mansion is currently privately owned. Tours are available by appointment.
