= Ship Island Light =

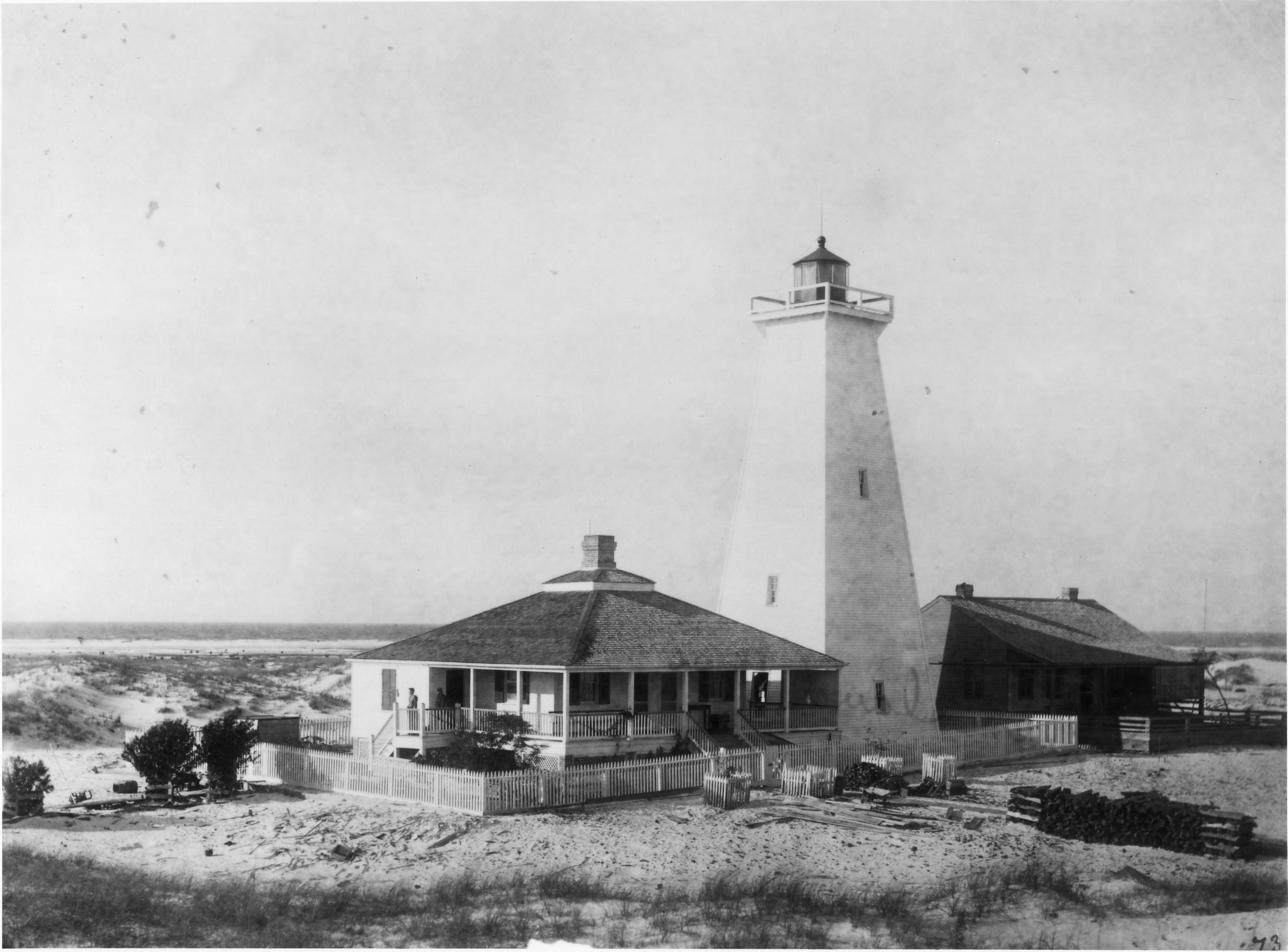
- 1892 photograph of Ship Island Light (USCG)
- Location: Ship Island west of Fort Massachusetts
- Coordinates: 30.2127°N 88.9661°W

Tower
- Constructed: 1853 (first tower); 1886 (second tower)
- Construction: brick (first tower) wood frame (second tower)
- Automated: 1950
- Height: 30 feet (9.1 m)
- Shape: Frustum of a cone (first tower) pyramidal (second tower)
- Markings: White with black lantern

Light
- First lit: 1971
- Deactivated: 1964
- Focal height: 76 feet (23 m)
- Lens: Fourth-order Fresnel lens
- Characteristic: varied

Ship Island Light was a lighthouse in Mississippi near Gulfport.

== History ==
The first tower at this site was constructed in 1853; though appropriations were made starting in 1848; disputes over land ownership delayed acquisition of the land. This tower was built of brick and was initially equipped with a multiple lamp and reflector system; three years later, it was upgraded to a fourth-order Fresnel lens.

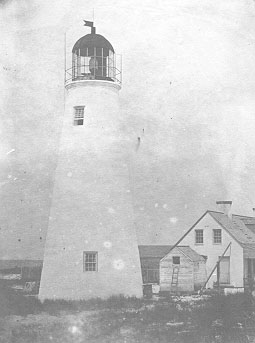
undated photograph of the 1853 tower (USCG)

In January 1861 at the beginning of the Civil War confederate forces seized the island, including the incomplete fortifications and the lighthouse. When they abandoned the fort in September, they stole the lighthouse lens and set the interior on fire. Union forces occupied the island shortly thereafter and restored it to operation in November 1862, using a different lens and lantern captured previously. The light was blacked out to the north to prevent its use by blockade runners approaching from the mainland.

The characteristic of the light was changed from fixed white to fixed red in 1880. Over time, the tower began to lean conspicuously. In 1886 it was condemned as unsafe and it finally collapsed in 1901.

After condemnation, a new tower was erected about 300 feet (91 m) away, constructed entirely of wood as an open framework, though it was soon sheathed in siding. Wood-frame keeper's houses were constructed to either side of it. During this era the light was tended by Dan McColl, who had lost a leg in a railroad accident. A set of range lights were erected to mark one section of the channel out of Gulfport, Mississippi; the rear light of the range stood on a short open wood tower, a short distance from the main tower. It was then determined that the labor of climbing three towers was too much too expect of McColl, and he was transferred to Cat Island Light, a nearby screw-pile lighthouse, where he served until he died in 1904.

In the 1800s and early 1900s the island served as a port of entry due to the deep water harbor behind it; besides the fort, there was a quarantine station, and the island was at times a popular destination for tourists. The importance of these facilities declined, and in 1934 most facilities on the island were deeded through act of Congress to an American Legion post; the lighthouse, however, was excluded at the Coast Guard's insistence. The character of the island changed considerably over time and in 1950, the light was automated. In 1959, the Coast Guard granted a special-use permit to a Philip M. Duvic "for private use and general recreational purposes" for the lighthouse. In the following few years Duvic renovated the lighthouse and converted the interior into a recreational living quarters. In 1964 the light was deactivated, and the following year it was put up for sale; Duvic (the sole bidder) was able to purchase it for $2560. A stipulation of the sale was that the structure had to be removed within ninety days of the sale; however, this stipulation was never enforced and the tower remained in place.

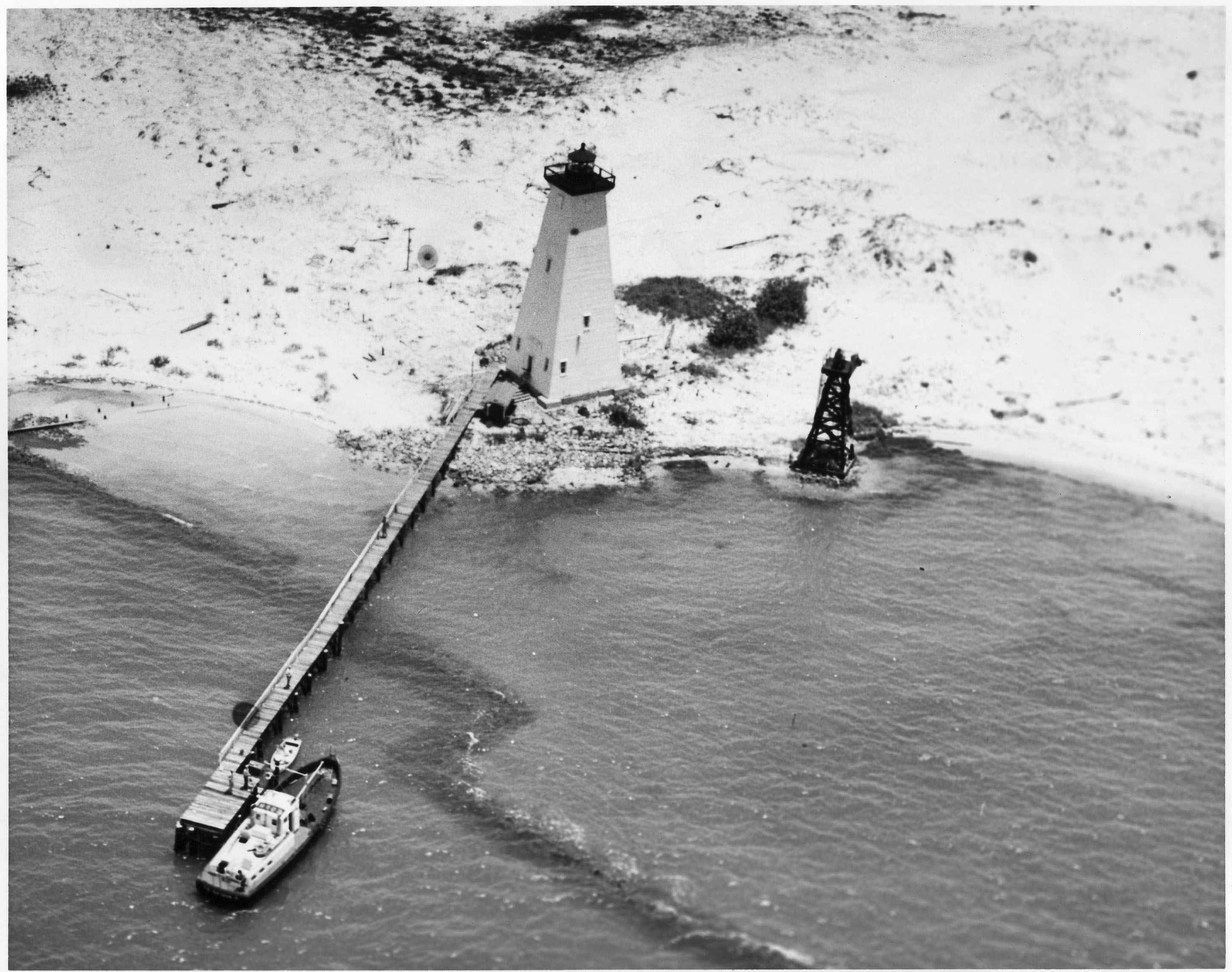
1954 Coast Guard archive photo shows an aerial view of the station and pier

The wood tower stood until 1972, when it was accidentally set on fire from sparks from a campers' fire and burned down. By that time Duvic had abandoned the tower, as Hurricane Camille had damaged it beyond repair. The old range light from the Dan McColl years was replaced in 1971 by a much taller steel skeletal tower which still stands.

In 2000 a replica of the wooden tower was built on the foundation of its predecessor. This work was sponsored by the Friends of Gulf Islands National Seashore; the actual construction was performed by Seabees, using beams provided by the forest service. The beacon was relit and appeared on charts as a private aid to navigation. It 2005, however, Hurricane Katrina destroyed it, leaving no trace but the foundation. The old Fresnel lens, which had been removed long before to the Maritime and Seafood Industry Museum in Biloxi, was also badly damaged at the time, though there are plans to repair it. The skeletal range light stands as the only light on the island.

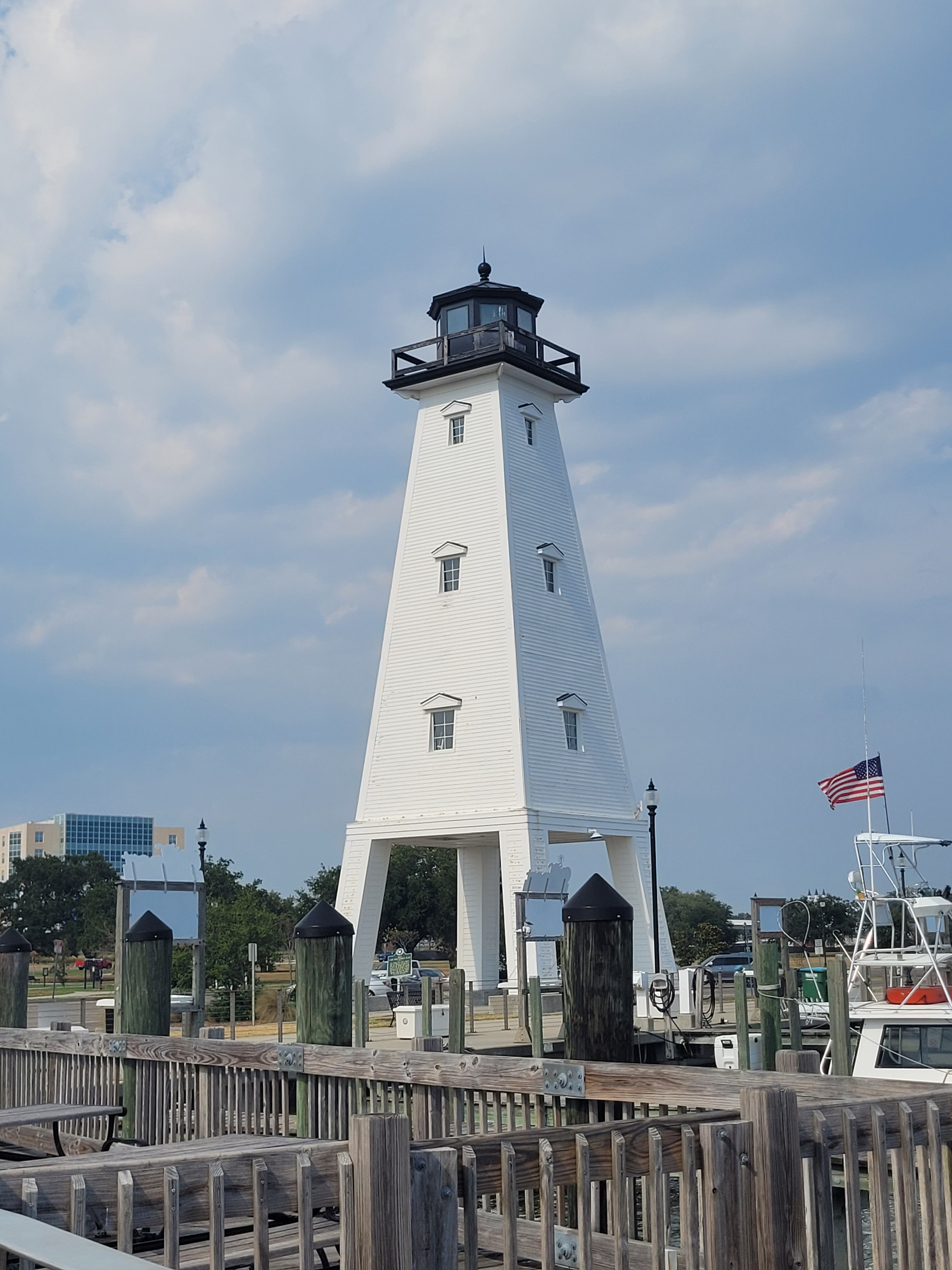
Replica of the lighthouse in Gulfport built following Hurricane Katrina

A replica lighthouse was built in Jones Park in Gulfport, Mississippi in time for the opening of the park in 2012. It was built by Simpkins & Costelli, Inc.
