= East Pascagoula River Light =

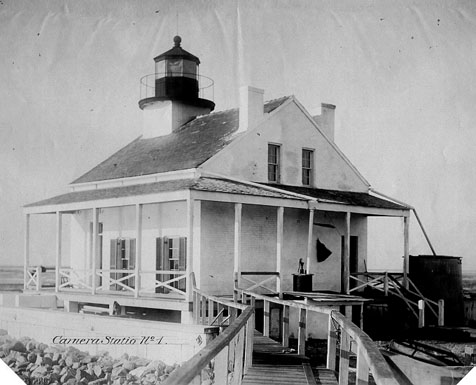
- Location: Pascagoula, Mississippi
- Coordinates: 30.350°N 88.568°W

Tower
- Height: 35 ft (11 m)
- Shape: house

Light
- First lit: 1854
- Deactivated: 1906

The East Pascagoula River Light was a lighthouse in Pascagoula, Mississippi. A house with a lantern on top, it was first lit in 1854 but was extinguished in the Civil War and was not relit until 1868. It was destroyed in the 1906 Mississippi hurricane and was never rebuilt.
