= Natchez Light =

Lighthouse in Mississippi, United States

- Location: Mississippi River, Mississippi

Tower
- Constructed: 1828
- Construction: brick
- Shape: cylindrical
- Operator: Joseph Bowman

Light
- Focal height: 35 feet

Natchez Light was a lighthouse on the Mississippi River that was built in 1825 and then destroyed in 1840 by a tornado.
