= Tchefuncte River Range Lights =

Lighthouse in Louisiana, United States

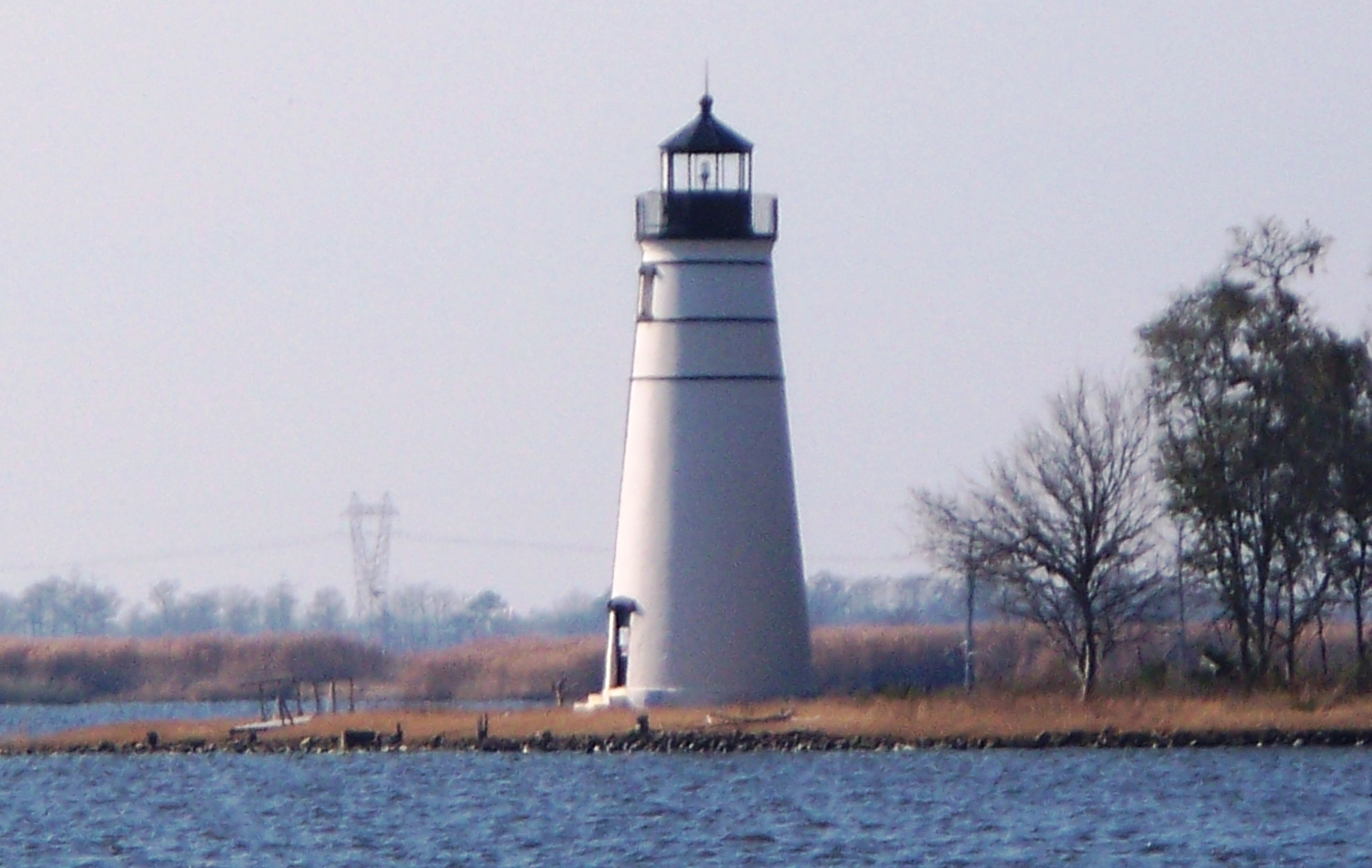
- Location: St. Tammany Parish, United States
- Coordinates: 30°23′N 90°10′W

Tower
- Constructed: 1838
- Tchefuncte River Range Rear Light
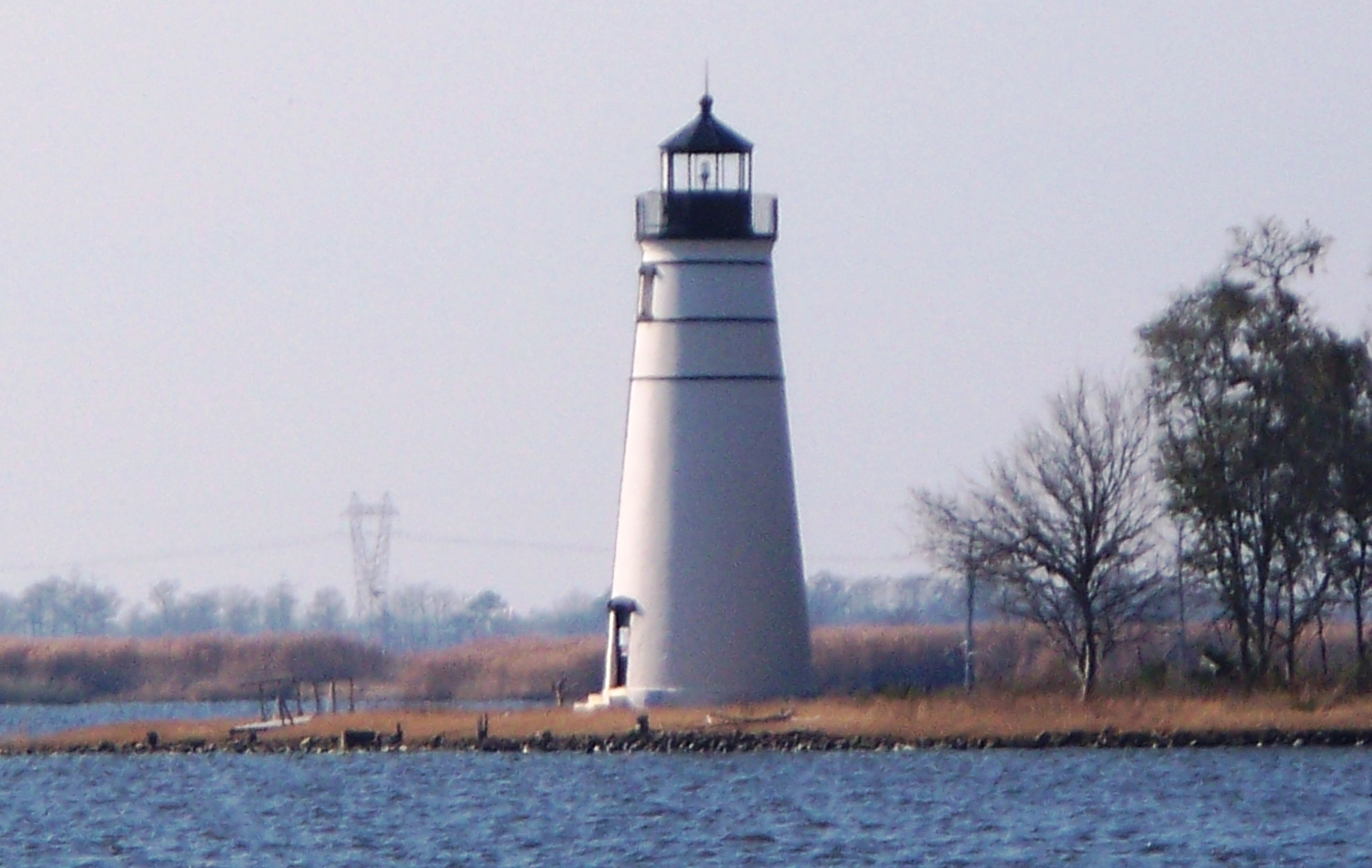
- Construction: brick (tower), stone (foundation)
- Automated: 1952
- Height: 16 m (52 ft)
- Shape: conical
- Markings: White (tower), black (vertical stripe), black (lantern)
- Heritage: National Register of Historic Places listed place
- Fog signal: none now, bell in past
- First lit: 1868
- Focal height: 49 ft (15 m)
- Lens: 5th order Fresnel lens (original), 9.8 inches (250 mm) (current)
- Range: 15 nmi (28 km; 17 mi)
- Characteristic: Iso W 6s
- Tchefuncte River Range Rear Light
- U.S. National Register of Historic Places
- Nearest city: Madisonville, Louisiana
- Area: 0.1 acres (0.040 ha)
- Built: 1867
- NRHP reference No.: 86001684
- Added to NRHP: July 14, 1986
- Tchefuncte River Range Front Light
- Shape: Skeleton tower
- Markings: KRW
- Focal height: 25 ft (7.6 m)
- Lens: fourth order Fresnel lens
- Characteristic: Q W

The Tchefuncte River Range Lights are a range that was first established in 1838 to aid vessels entering the Tchefuncte River from the north side of Lake Pontchartrain, Louisiana. The lighting apparatus was supplied by Winslow Lewis and consisted of nine lamps with several fourteen-inch reflectors. The original rear tower suffered during the Civil War and was replaced with the current tower in 1868. The new tower, ten feet taller than the first, was built on the same foundation, using some of the same brick. It was given a lantern which had been removed from Cat Island Light in Mississippi.

The rear tower has a black vertical stripe to serve as the range line in daytime. It sits on a spit of land, but is accessible only by boat. The front tower is marked with a standard USCG KRW daymark, with a red stripe between two white stripes. It is a skeleton tower and sits in open water.

The rear tower was added to the National Register of Historic Places in 1986. The Maritime Museum Louisiana is making efforts to restore and stabilize the light.

Rear light
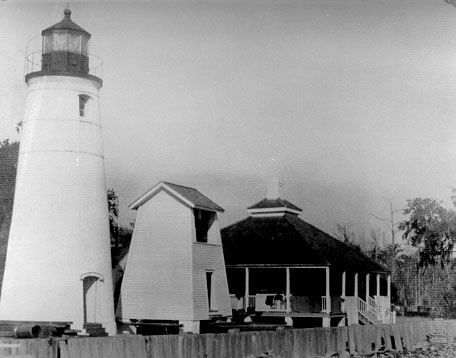
1937

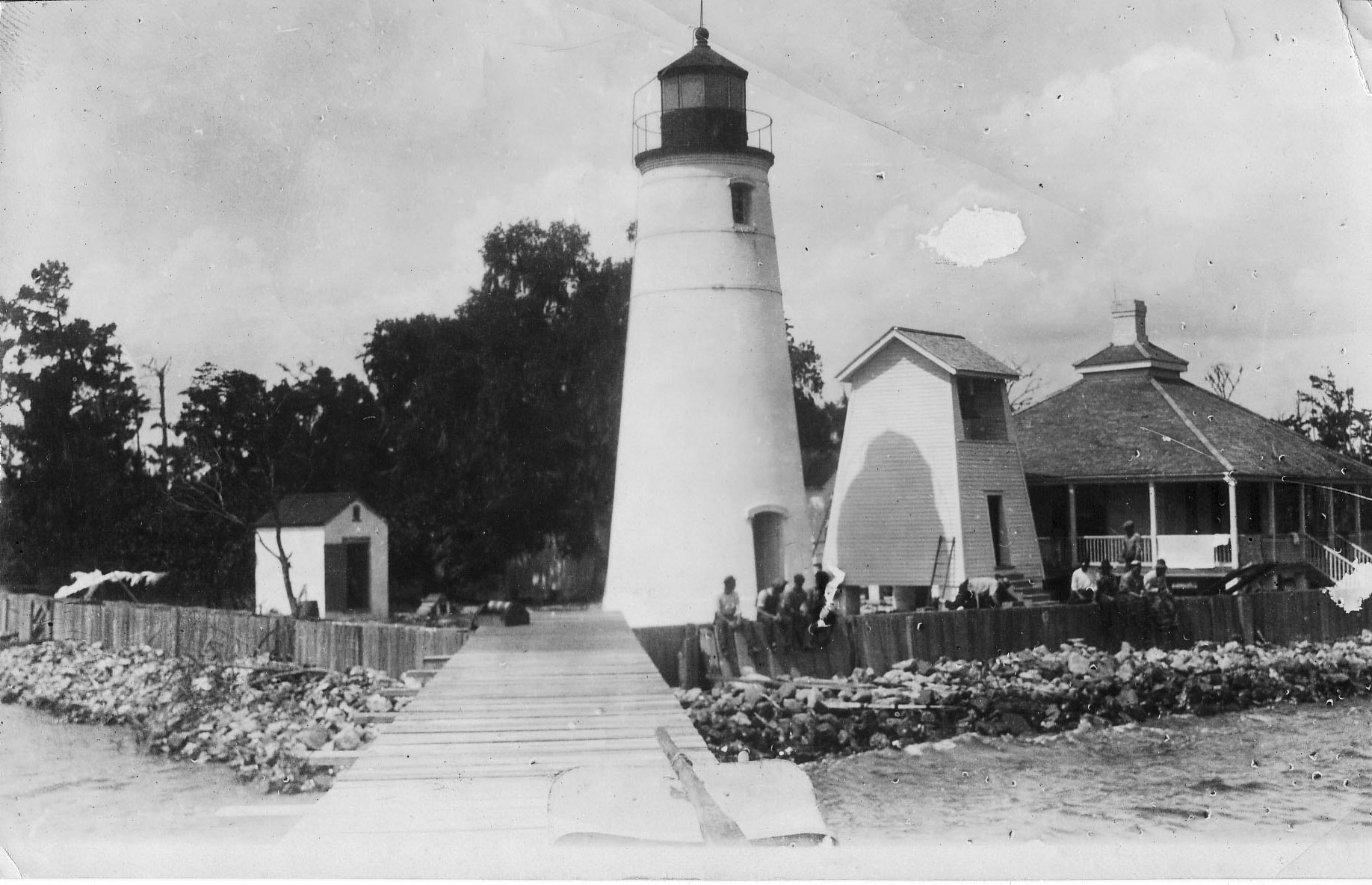
1918

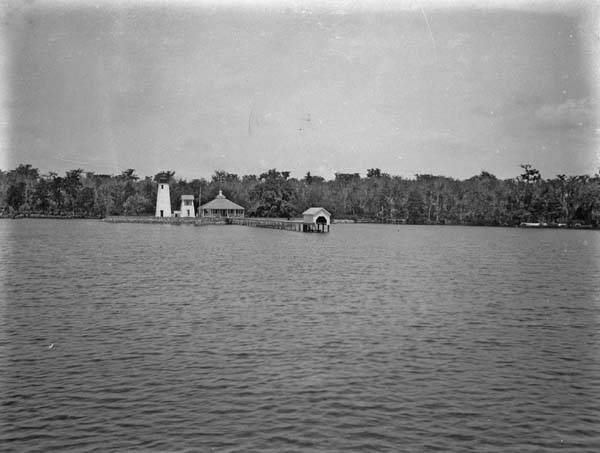
1905

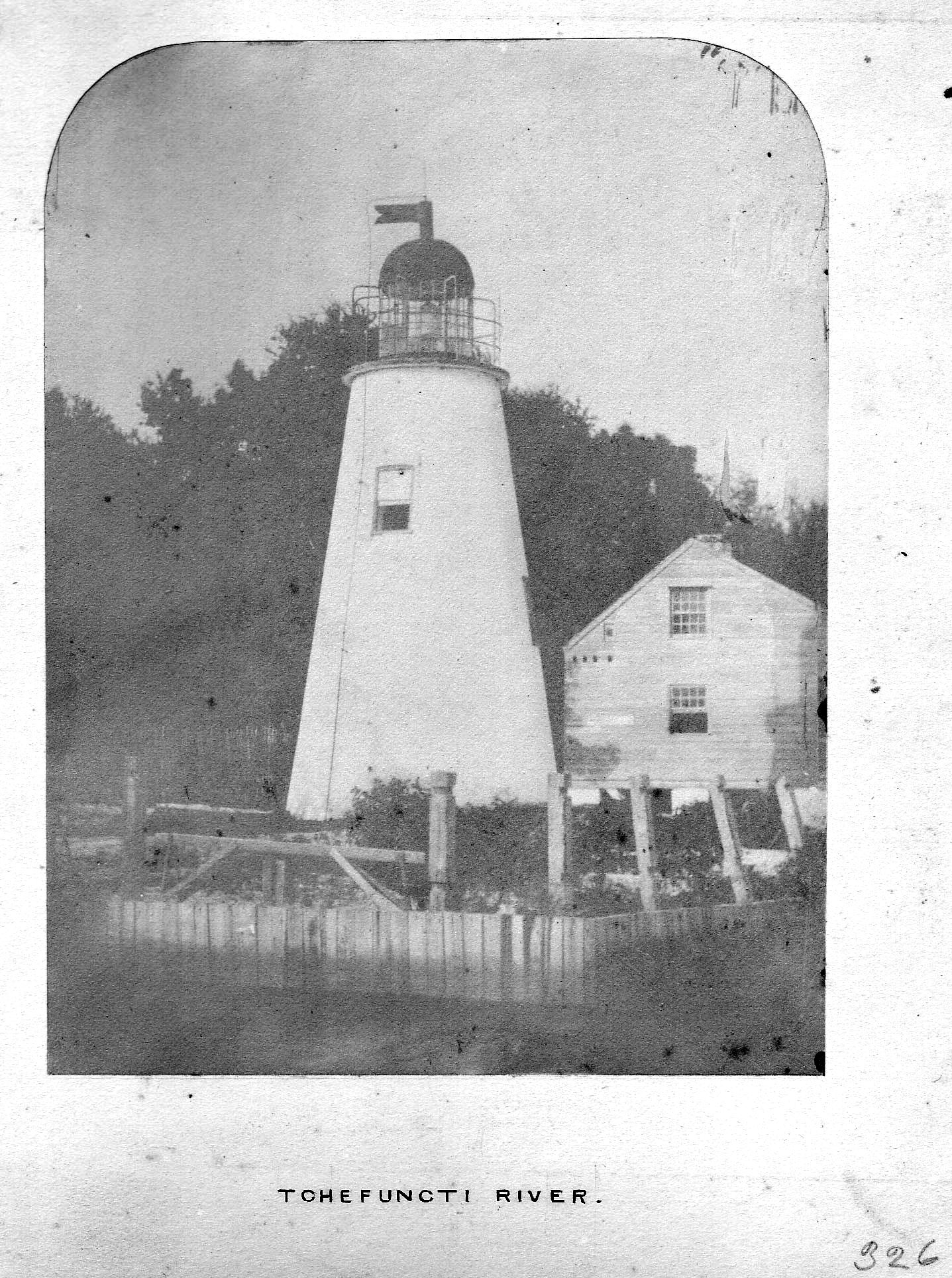
The original tower, c1860

== See also ==
- West Rigolets Light former lighthousd also in St. Tammany Parish
- National Register of Historic Places listings in St. Tammany Parish, Louisiana
