= Gautier School =

School in Mississippi, United States

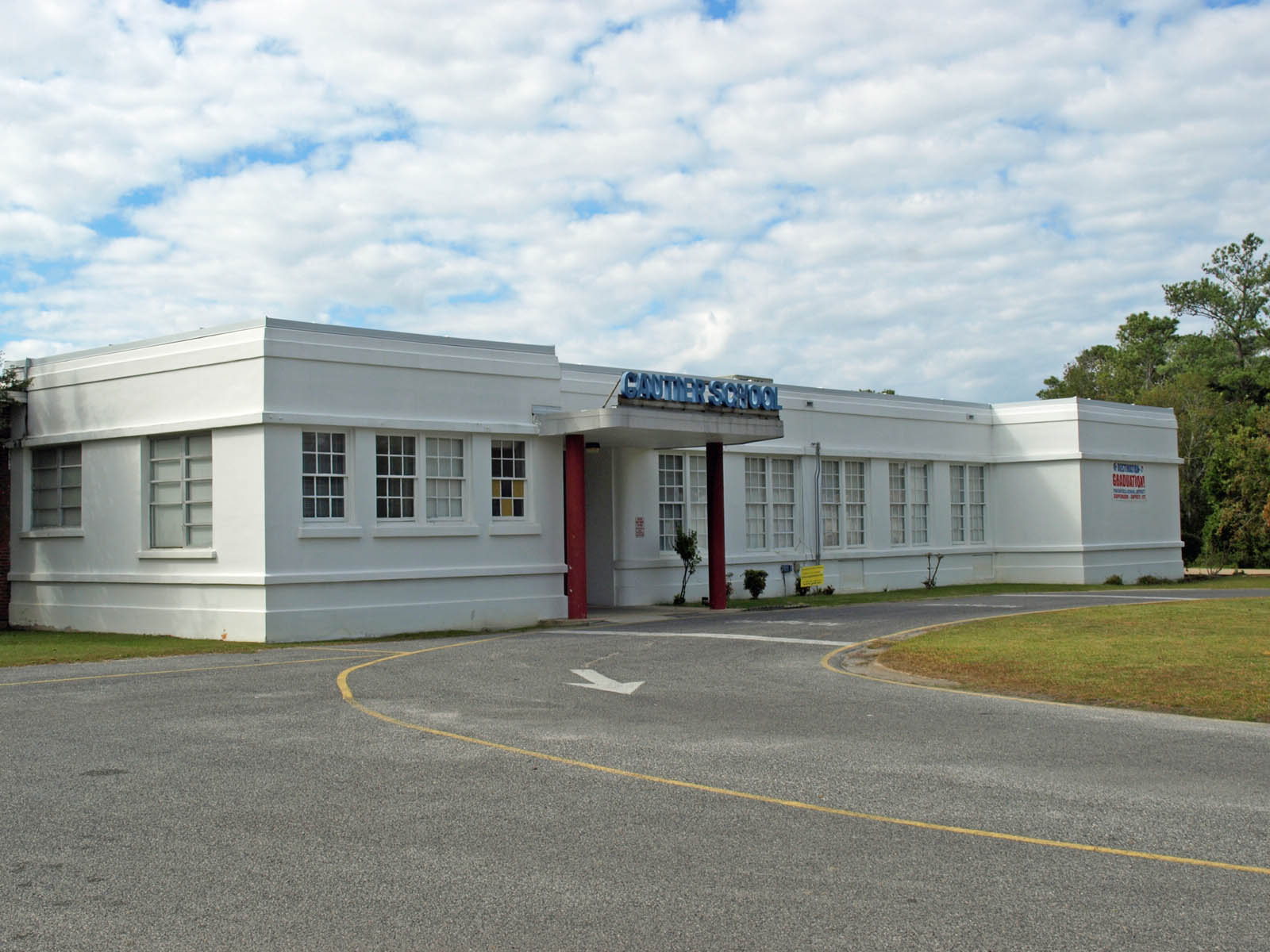

Gautier School is a historic school in Gautier, Mississippi in Jackson County, Mississippi. A historical marker is located at it and the school is listed on the National Register of Historic Places.

The Streamline Moderne building was designed by architect James Warren McCleskey Jr. and built in 1940. Additions were made in 1962. A Hattiesburg based architect who died in 2015, he also designed the Chateau Grand Apartment Complex.

A former principal of the school wrote the nomination and it was listed on the National Register November 14, 2012.

The school is still in operation as one of Gautier's three elementary schools.

== See also ==
- National Register of Historic Places listings in Jackson County, Mississippi
