= Cat Island Light =

Lighthouse in Mississippi, US

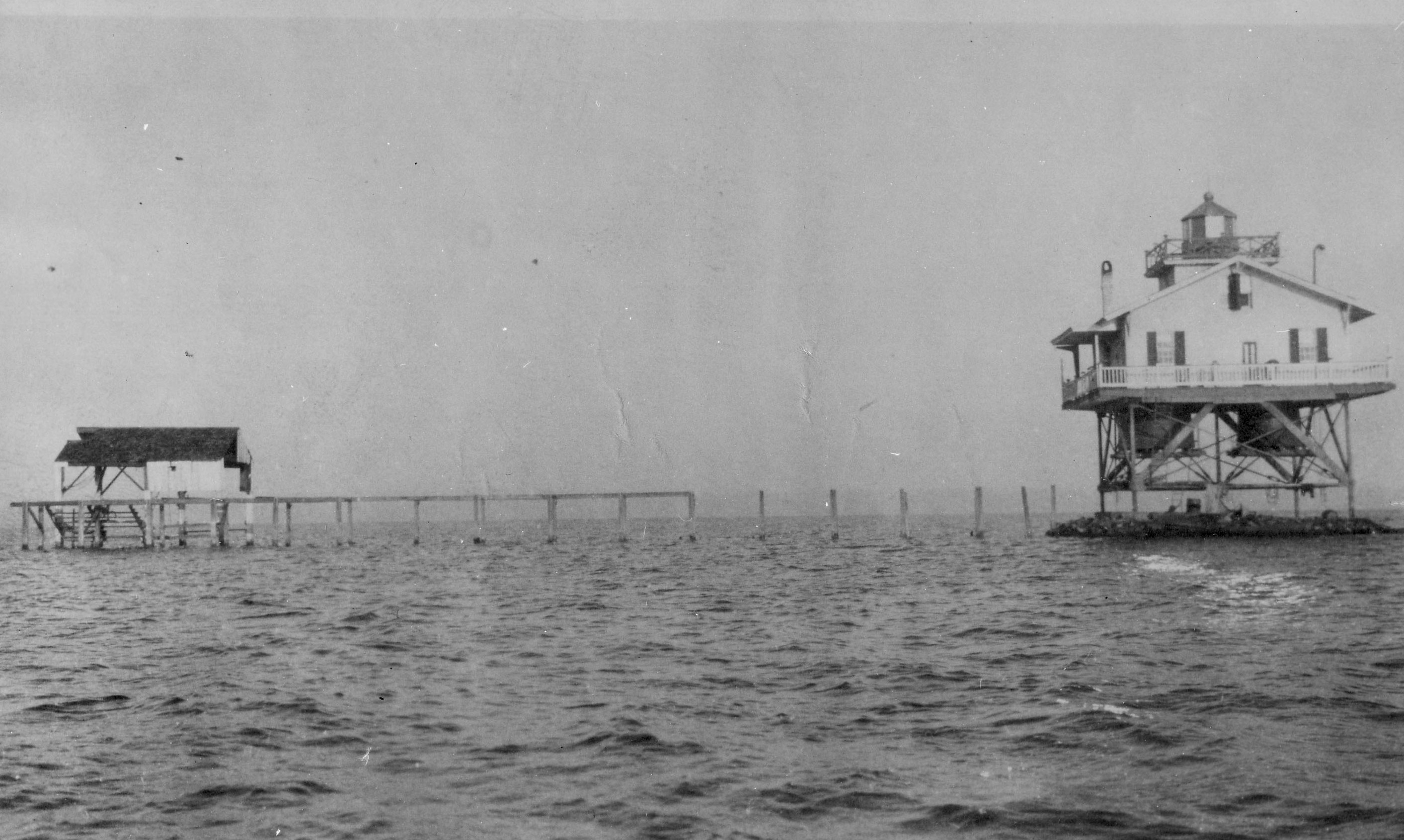
- Cat Island Light in 1915 (USCG)
- Location: west end of Cat Island off Mississippi coast
- Coordinates: 30°13′50.94″N 89°09′41.68″W

Tower
- Constructed: 1831
- Foundation: none (1st) screw-pile (2nd)
- Construction: brick (1st) cast-iron/wood (2nd)
- Height: 30 feet (9.1 m) (1st); 40 feet (12 m) (2nd)
- Shape: conical tower (1st) square house (2nd)

Light
- First lit: 1831 (1st); 1871 (2nd)
- Deactivated: 1937
- Lens: 10 lamps w/reflectors fifth-order Fresnel lens (2nd)

The Cat Island Light was a lighthouse located on Cat Island off the coast of Mississippi. Originally built to guide shipping through the Mississippi Sound, it was discontinued as traffic moved further south.

== History ==
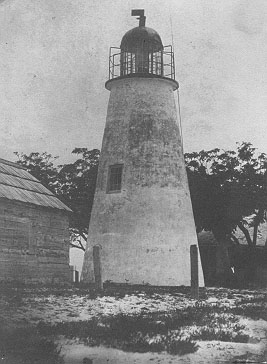
The 1831 tower (USCG)

The first lighthouse at this location was erected in 1831, following an appropriation in 1827. Construction was delayed by the need to survey and acquire land. The contract was given to Winslow Lewis, who also constructed the Pass Christian Light under the same contract. Lewis subcontracted construction of the Cat Island tower to Lazarus Baukens, who erected a conical brick tower to the same design as that used for the Pass Christian Light. An 1854 inspection, however, revealed that the structure was set directly on the sand, with no foundation whatsoever. It was provided with the lamp and reflector arrangement typical of such early lights. This was replaced in 1857 with a Fresnel lens, and in 1859 a new lantern was constructed.

The tower was constantly threatened by erosion, and in 1856 funds were appropriated to move it; however, nothing ever came of this. This followed the destruction of the original keeper's house in the 1855 hurricane. The tower was damaged in a hurricane in 1860 and burned by the Confederates during the Civil War. After the war, the lantern was taken to be used for the Tchefuncte River Range Rear Light, and in 1872 the bricks were removed to be used as riprap to shore up the failing St. Joseph Island Light.

The previous year, a new lighthouse was erected, a square screw-pile structure. Erosion and storms continued to be problems, and in 1900 riprap was piled around the piles to stabilize it. In 1937 the light was discontinued due to decreasing traffic through the area. The house stood abandoned and eventually burned in 1961. The iron foundation continues to stand and appears as a hazard on NOAA charts. It is also a local fishing spot, known affectionately as The Bird Cage.
