= Lewis lamp =

Type of light fixture used in lighthouses

The Lewis lamp is a type of light fixture used in lighthouses. It was invented by Winslow Lewis who patented the design in 1810. The primary marketing point of the Lewis lamp was that it used less than half the oil of the prior oil lamps they replaced. The lamp used a similar design to an Argand lamp, adding a parabolic reflector behind the lamp and a magnifying lens made from 4-inch-diameter (100 mm) green bottle glass in front of the lamp. A similar variant using a parabolic reflector was created by the inventor of the Argand lamp, Aimé Argand. While the Argand variant became widely used by European lighthouses, the Lewis lamp design was selected by the United States for use in American lighthouses.

The Lewis lamp would use groups of lamps.

The Lewis lamp design proved to have several flaws. To begin, it was really an inferior version of the Argand lamp. The reflector was made of copper with an interior silver plating to reflect light; however, the thin copper would warp under the heat of the lamps to become more spherical than parabolic. Also, the silver plating was of poor quality and would be scratched off during routine cleanings. Adding to the problem was poor draft for the combustion gases, so that soot would build up on the components, decreasing any alleged improvement. In particular, there was a green lens, which ostensibly improved the visibility, but which was prone to being covered in soot. The sooting became such a problem that the lenses were removed from the lamps.

The Lewis lamp was the paramount design used in American lighthouses for a number of years. In part, this was due to the federal government's distinct preference for awarding contracts to the lowest bidder. It was also claimed that the Lewis lamp would use substantially less fuel than the Argand lamps, which was true (provided one did not take into account the quality of the illumination).

Additionally, there were allegations (never proved) of an untoward relationship between Mr. Lewis and the contracting federal officers. The better view seems to be that the federal officers were not engineers and were in no way fit to make an evaluation of the quality of the lamps. In fact, Congress eventually established a committee process to review the specifications for the lamps. At a point, the federal officer made claims that the Fresnel lens was too complicated to be used by members of the lighthouse service. In fact, such concerns turned out to be baseless.

In 1852, the Lewis lamps began being replaced with Fresnel lenses, due to the improved viewing distance offered by the Fresnel lens design. This transition was completed by the end of the American Civil War. Fresnel lenses were initially more expensive to install, but they used only one wick and provided better and more focused light, thereby using even less fuel than the Lewis Lamps.
