= Pass Christian Light =

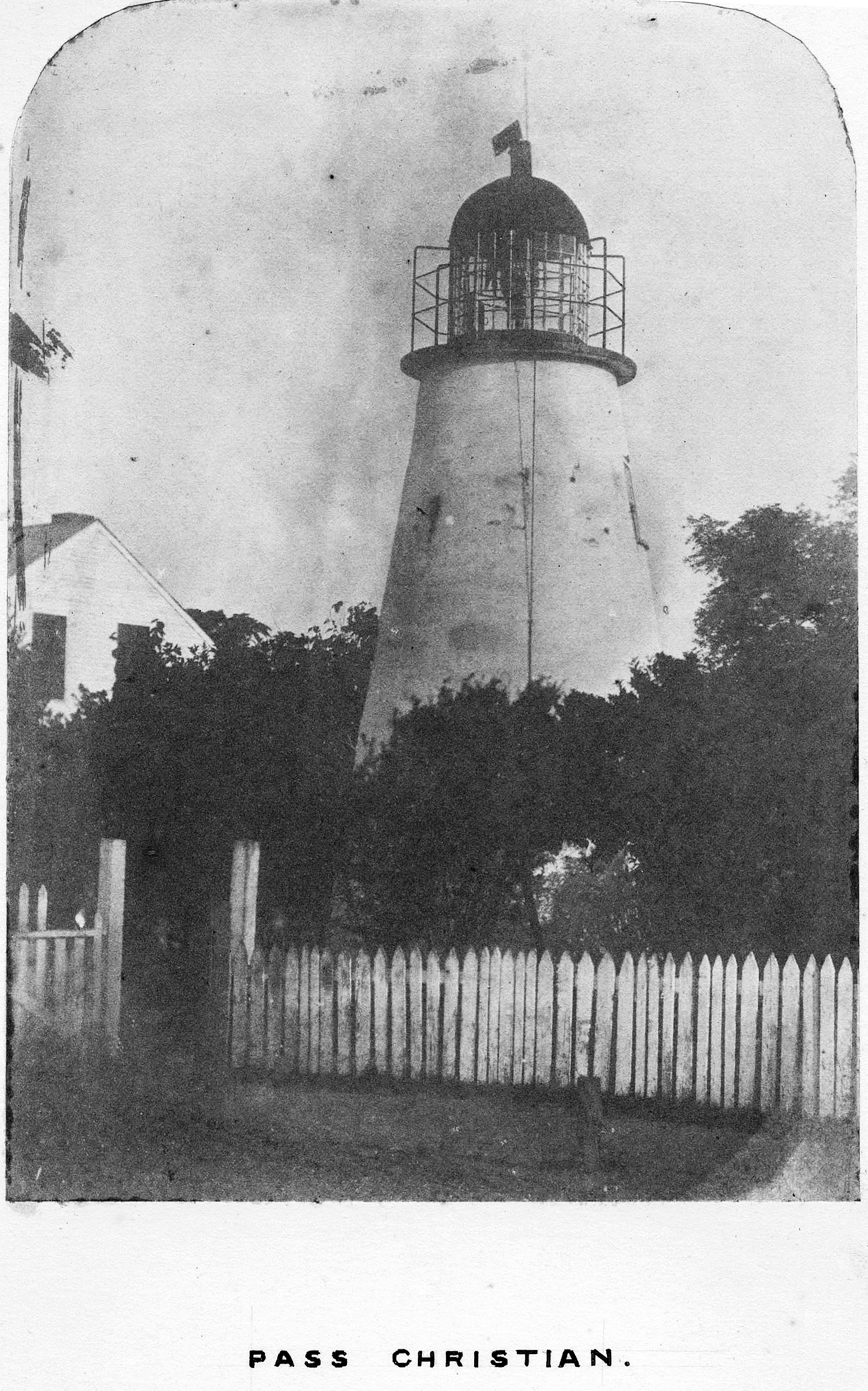
- Pass Christian Light (USCG)
- Location: Pass Christian, Mississippi
- Coordinates: 30°18′50″N 89°15′3″W

Tower
- Height: 30 feet (9.1 m)(2nd)
- Shape: conical tower

Light
- First lit: 1831
- Deactivated: 1882
- Lens: lamps w/reflectors fourth-order Fresnel lens (2nd)

The Pass Christian Light, in Pass Christian, Mississippi, was one of the first lighthouses built in the State. First lit in 1831, it was deactivated in 1882 and later demolished.

== History ==
The Pass Christian Light, along with the Cat Island Light, was built by Winslow Lewis, constructor of many early lighthouses. The tower was originally 28 feet (8.5 m) and equipped with an array of eight lamps and reflectors, first lit in 1831; in 1857 this was replaced with a fourth-order Fresnel lens. The lighthouse and keeper's dwelling sat in the center of town on the main street on a half-acre (0.2 ha) plot purchased for $250 from Senator Edward Livingston of Louisiana.

The obscuring of the beacon by obstructions became a theme of the history of the light. In 1860, for example, complaints were registered as to a cupola on an adjoining store; proposal was made to increase the height of the tower in order to clear the obstruction. At the same time consideration was made of selling the property and building a new light at a different site, as the current site had become more valuable as a result of its central location in town. This came to naught amid the Civil War, for Confederate forces took the lens from the tower, and the light went dark until 1866. Restoration of the beacon came at the behest of citizens of the town, and the old lens (which had been located at war's end) was returned to the tower. At this time it appears that the tower was raised by two feet. In 1878 the dilapidated keeper's house was replaced with a much larger dwelling.

By this time obstruction of the beacon had become an issue again, but this time the culprit was trees which had grown up on a neighboring lot. The owner refused to remove or trim the trees, and the lighthouse board concluded that the light was not useful and should be discontinued. Although objections were raised by shippers and local residents, they were to no avail: the light was extinguished in 1882 and the property sold the year after. The lighthouse itself was demolished.
