= Round Island (Mississippi) =

Island in Jackson County, Mississippi, United States

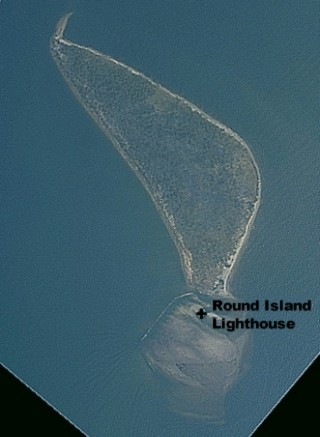
Satellite view of Round Island in 2005, three days after Hurricane Katrina, during which the Lighthouse was destroyed.

Round Island is a small, uninhabited island in the Mississippi Sound, 6.5 kilometres (4.0 miles) south of Pascagoula, Mississippi, U.S.A. The island is a coastal preserve, situated in Jackson County and managed by the Mississippi Department of Marine Resources. The relatively isolated terrain—consisting of slash pine forest, interior marsh, and sandy beach—provides feeding, resting, and wintering habitat for migratory birds, including the brown pelican, white pelican, and cormorants. A number of rare or endangered species, including the Ruellia noctiflora, are found there.

In 1849, Round Island was used as a staging area by Venezuelan adventurer Narciso López for a filibustering expedition to liberate Cuba. The expedition involved three chartered ships and as many as 600 men. However, US president Zachary Taylor, who had renounced filibustering as a valid means of U.S. expansion, took steps against López and ordered his ships blockaded and seized. After six weeks, all the volunteers had been talked into leaving Round Island.

The island had a lighthouse as early as 1833. The original wooden structure was replaced in 1859 with a brick lighthouse at 30.2919°N 88.5867°W at the southern tip of the island. In 1998, the lighthouse was toppled by Hurricane Georges. In 2005, reconstruction of the lighthouse was in progress, but the structure was destroyed by Hurricane Katrina.

Hurricane Katrina damaged Round Island, cutting channels partly or completely through from east to west. A $7.5 billion, ten-year Gulf Coast environmental restoration initiative announced in December 2005 included plans to restore Round Island. Recurring hurricanes and natural erosion had reduced the size of the island from 0.93 square kilometres (230 acres) in 1884 to only 0.101 square kilometres (25 acres) following Hurricane Katrina. In the summer of 2013, VT Halter Marine began expanding its shipyard facility in Pascagoula and offered dredged materials to increase the footprint of Round Island. Upon completion, the dredging project was expected to add 0.285 square kilometres (70 acres) of new land to the island.

== Nearby islands ==
- Deer Island
- Horn Island
- Petit Bois Island
