= St. Joseph Island Light =

- Location: St. Joseph Island at west end of Mississippi Sound
- Coordinates: 30°11′27″N 89°25′20″W

Light
- First lit: 1861
- Deactivated: 1888

The St. Joseph Island Light was a lighthouse which stood at the entrance to Lake Borgne on the north side of Mississippi Sound. It was replaced by the Lake Borgne Light to the west as the island on which it stood was eroded, and was destroyed by a hurricane in 1893. An unmanned light was eventually erected on the ruins along with a USGS water monitoring station.
