= Round Island Light, Mississippi =

Lighthouse in Mississippi, United States

Round Island Light
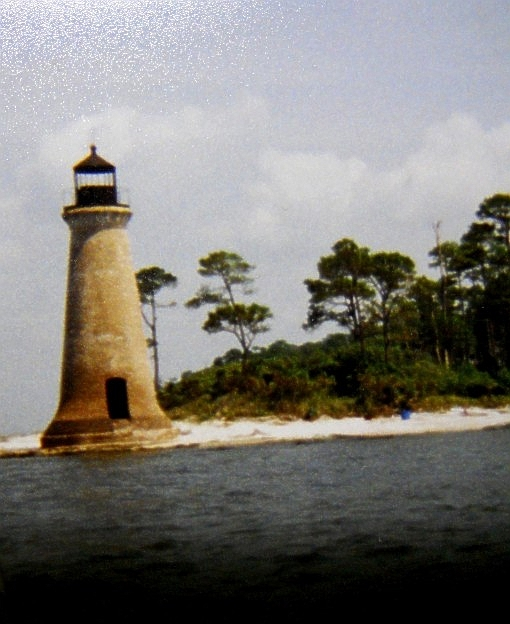
- Round Island Lighthouse, 1998. Original coordinates 30.2919°N 88.5867°W
- Location: Pascagoula, Mississippi
- Coordinates: 30.37070°N 88.55590°W (2013)

Tower
- Foundation: Unknown
- Construction: Brick
- Automated: 1944
- Height: 50 feet (15 m)
- Shape: Conical
- Markings: Red Brick
- Heritage: National Register of Historic Places listed place, Mississippi Landmark

Light
- First lit: 1859
- Deactivated: 1949
- Lens: fourth order Fresnel lens
- Range: 10–12 nautical miles; 19–23 kilometres (12–14 mi)
- Round Island Light
- U.S. National Register of Historic Places
- Mississippi Landmark
- NRHP reference No.: 86002815
- USMS No.: 059-PAS-0223-NR-ML

Significant dates
- Added to NRHP: October 9, 1986
- Designated USMS: February 25, 1987

Round Island Lighthouse stood from 1859 to 1998 on the southwest end of Round Island in the Mississippi Sound, 4 miles (6.4 km) south of Pascagoula, Mississippi. In September 1998, the lighthouse was toppled by Hurricane Georges. In 2010, the base of the structure and other lighthouse remnants were removed from Round Island and relocated within the City of Pascagoula for restoration.

== History ==
=== Construction ===
In 1833, the United States Lighthouse Board contracted for construction of a lighthouse on Round Island in the Mississippi Sound. By 1854, the Lighthouse Board determined that the structure was poorly built and was too close to the water, which eroded the foundation. Construction of a second lighthouse along with a keeper's dwelling was contracted and completed in 1859 at a cost of $7,130.97. The 1859 tower stood 50 feet (15 m) tall with a focal plane of 44 feet (13 m) above sea level and had a visible range of 10 to 12 nautical miles; 19 to 23 kilometres (12 to 14 mi) from a fourth order Fresnel lens.

=== Operation ===
Up until the 1920s, when most lighthouses were converted to electric power, various forms of oil (sperm oil, rapeseed oil, lard, and kerosene) were burned as illuminants.

During the American Civil War (1861-1865), the Fresnel lens was removed from Round Island Lighthouse by Confederate soldiers and transported to Montgomery, Alabama for safekeeping.

Round Island Lighthouse was automated in 1944 but was deactivated five years later. After deactivation, the U.S. Coast Guard maintained the lighthouse as a day beacon, without illumination, through 1954. Given the lack of historical information about the lighthouse for navigation, its significance is thought to be mainly as a beacon for accessing Pascagoula Harbor.

In 1955, the lighthouse, dwelling, pier, and outbuildings were declared excess property by the General Services Administration. Through the years, the lighthouse suffered from vandalism, disrepair, and wave erosion. In 1986, the lighthouse and approximately 50 acres (20 ha) of land were deeded to the City of Pascagoula by the Bureau of Land Management. The lighthouse was added the National Register of Historic Places on October 9, 1986.

=== Destruction and relocation ===
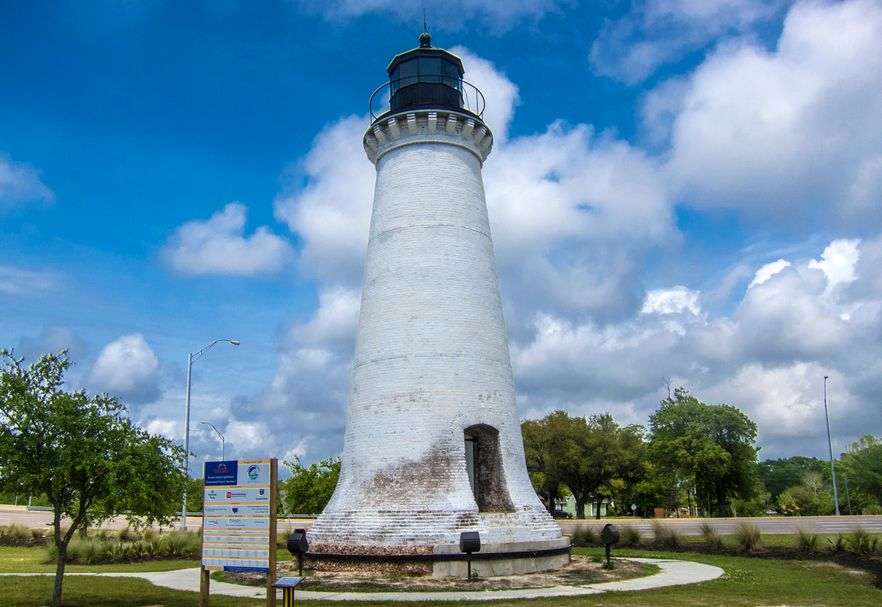
Restored lighthouse in 2015

In September 1998, Round Island Lighthouse was toppled by Hurricane Georges. Plans were made to rebuild the lighthouse at its original location on Round Island, and construction was initiated. However, in August 2005, rebuilding efforts ended when Hurricane Katrina destroyed the partially reconstructed lighthouse. Because of the precarious location on Round Island, which exposed the lighthouse to erosion and destruction from future storms, the Pascagoula City Council made a decision to rebuild the lighthouse within the City of Pascagoula, using as much of the original construction materials as could be salvaged from the island. As of 2012, the original base of the lighthouse and the restored lantern gallery had been secured at their new location, just south of U.S. Route 90 in Pascagoula. By July 2014, the exterior of the lighthouse had been restored and topped with the original lantern gallery.

In June 2025, a museum for the Round Island Lighthouse opened in a small building next to the lighthouse. This maritime museum is renowned as being the smallest in the world and contains historical photographs of the lighthouse as well as wildlife fossils and maritime artifacts.
