= Peter Le Barbier Duplessis =

First marshal of Louisiana (c.1779–1817)

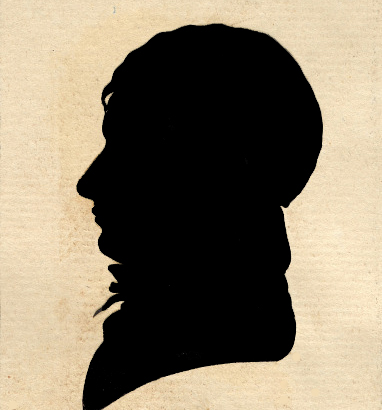
Peter Le Barbier Duplessis, 1779–1817, first United States marshal of Louisiana

Peter Le Barbier Duplessis (French pronunciation: [dyplɛsi]; c. 1779 – 8 October 1817) (not to be confused with his father (7 January 1749 – 8 November 1815) and his son (c. 1806 – 24 October 1849) of the same name) was the first United States marshal of the State of Louisiana, and "played an important role in the defense and development of a still young United States ...helping General Andrew Jackson not only save the city [of New Orleans] but also save his [Jackson's] reputation many years later."

== Early life ==
Duplessis was born in Philadelphia c. 1779 to parents Pierre Le Barbier Duplessis and Elizabeth Cooper and moved to New Orleans in December 1803, the year of the Louisiana Purchase. It was observed that Duplessis "speaks and writes English and French alike well," as his father had immigrated to the USA from France. He married Celeste Chabot, with Governor William C. C. Claiborne of the Territory of Orleans in attendance, in 1805.

== Early career ==
Duplessis worked as a territorial auctioneer and recorder of mortgages for the Territory of Orleans until 1811, and was a member of the cavalry of the territorial militia. On 25 May 1811 he was appointed the fourth marshal of the Territory of Orleans on recommendation of Governor Claiborne, and in 1812 was appointed first marshal of the State of Louisiana.

== War of 1812 ==
From the early months of the 1814–1815 Gulf Campaign of the British approaching New Orleans in the War of 1812, Duplessis collected and conveyed intelligence pertinent to the developing conflict to Andrew Jackson at Mobile. Jackson was a major general in the United States Army and a future president of the United States. Jackson and his army arrived to defend New Orleans on 2 December 2014 and Jackson appointed Duplessis as an aide.

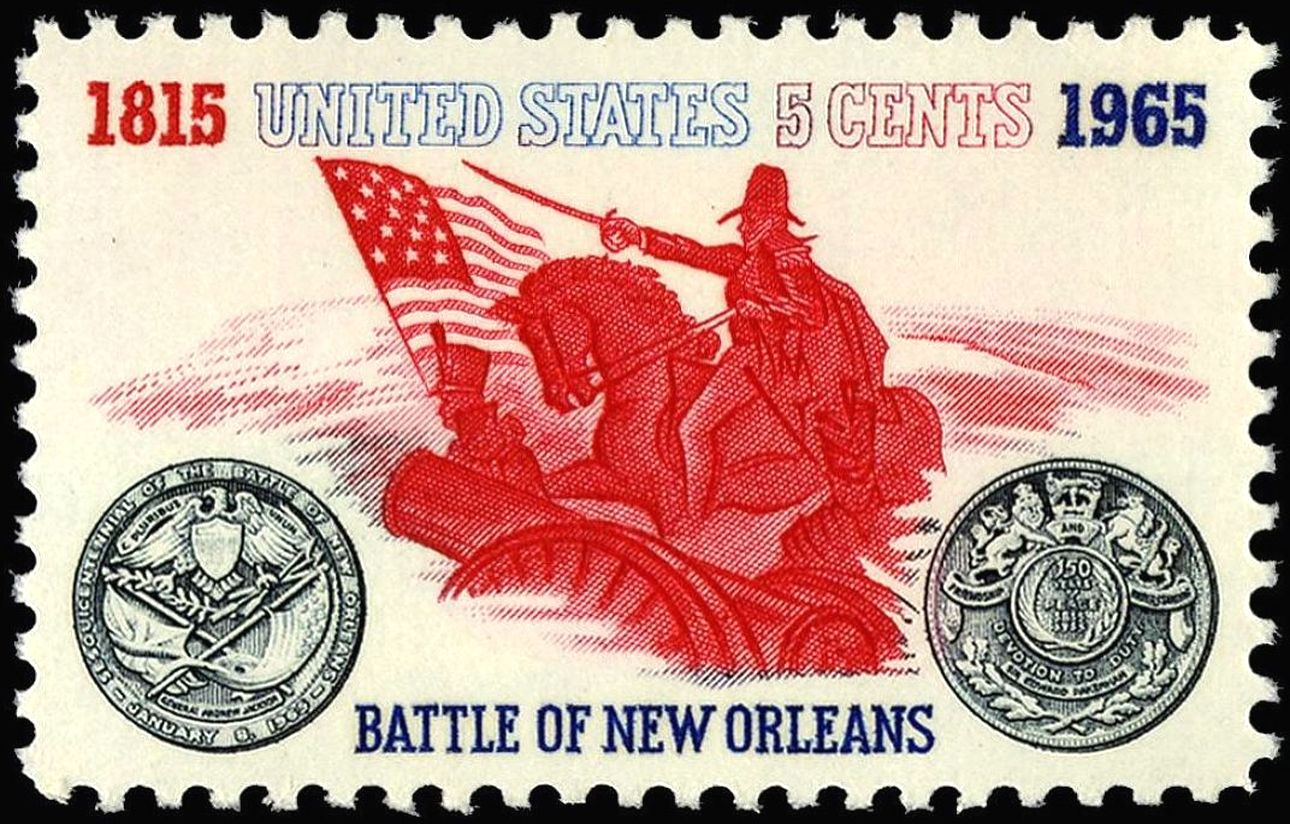
Battle of NewOrleans 1965 Issue-5c

The local knowledge and connections of Marshal Duplessis were a huge asset to Jackson, but accompanying Jackson during battle placed Duplessis at considerable risk. Duplessis was present at Jackson’s headquarters during the British artillery bombardment of 1 January 1815, and survived only by lying flat on the ground. Jackson later commented that Duplessis “faced danger wherever it was to be met, and carried my orders with the utmost promptitude.”

== Postwar years ==
After the war, Duplessis served as collector of customs for the Port of New Orleans, 1815–1816, the sixth collector since 1803. On 15 June 1816, a commission was struck to consider the design, siting, and construction of a lighthouse at the mouth of the Mississippi River. Commission members included Duplessis, with title lighthouse superintendent, architect Henry Sellon Latrobe, and United States Navy officer Captain Daniel Patterson. Latrobe's design may have been adapted from an earlier design by his father, Benjamin Henry Latrobe. A report was submitted to the commissioner of revenue on 12 November 1816, with a plan for Frank's Island Light. This was constructed after the death of Duplessis, but soil instability problems required its replacement, and eventually Frank Island eroded away. Duplessis died on 8 October 1817 in Savannah, Georgia at the age of 38.

== Legacy ==
Twenty-five years after the death of Peter Le Barbier Duplessis, he received the attention of the United States Congress. In 1842, a bill was introduced to refund Andrew Jackson a $1000 fine that had been levied against him at New Orleans in 1815. This bill generated a “long and bitter” congressional debate regarding Jackson’s conduct in New Orleans and included reference to Duplessis as a witness to the events of 1815. In 1844, the bill was enacted and Jackson was reimbursed the fine plus interest, but of greatest comfort to Jackson was the associated removal of the long-standing “stain” upon his character and reputation.
