= John Pope (Kentucky politician) =

American politician (1770–1845)

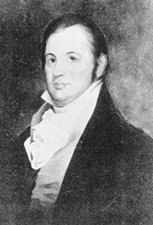

President pro tempore of the United States Senate
- In office February 23, 1811 – November 3, 1811
- Preceded by: John Gaillard
- Succeeded by: William H. Crawford

United States Senator from Kentucky
- In office March 4, 1807 – March 3, 1813
- Preceded by: Henry Clay
- Succeeded by: Jesse Bledsoe

12th Secretary of State of Kentucky
- In office October 21, 1816 – August 2, 1819
- Governor: Gabriel Slaughter
- Preceded by: Charles Stewart Todd
- Succeeded by: Oliver G. Waggener

3rd Governor of Arkansas Territory
- In office March 9, 1829 – March 9, 1835
- President: Andrew Jackson
- Preceded by: George Izard
- Succeeded by: William S. Fulton

Member of the U.S. House of Representatives from Kentucky's 7th district
- In office March 4, 1837 – March 3, 1843
- Preceded by: Benjamin Hardin
- Succeeded by: William Thomasson

Member of the Kentucky Senate
- In office 1825–1829

Member of the Kentucky House of Representatives
- In office 1802; 1806–1807

Personal details
- Born: February 1770 Prince William County, Virginia, British America
- Died: July 12, 1845 (aged 75) Springfield, Kentucky, U.S.
- Party: Democratic-Republican (as Senator); Democratic (as Governor); Whig/Independent (as Representative)
- Spouse(s): Anne Henry Christian (m. 1795, d. March 1, 1806); Elizabeth "Eliza" Janet Dorcas Johnson (m. 1810, d. April 24, 1818); widow Mrs. Frances Watkins Walton (m. 1820, d. Nov. 28, 1843)
- Children: 2
- Education: Salem Academy; College of William & Mary
- Occupation: Lawyer, politician

John Pope (February 1770 – July 12, 1845) was a United States senator from Kentucky. He was a member of the United States House of Representatives from Kentucky, secretary of state of Kentucky, and the third governor of Arkansas Territory.

== Early life and education ==
Pope was born near Bristow in Prince William County, Virginia in 1770, the first son of the former Penelope Sanford Edwards (1757–) and her husband Col. William H. Pope (1740–1825). He had younger brothers William H. Pope Jr (1775–1844) who was born as the family continued moving westward into Fauquier County, Virginia, as well as Alexander Pope (1781–1826) and Nathaniel Pope (1784–1850), both of whom were born as the family moved to Louisville in what was then Kentucky County, Virginia. His youngest brother Nathaniel would also become a lawyer, but continued the family's westward migration by first establishing a legal practice in the Missouri Territory before moving slightly east and holding various positions in the Illinois Territory and ultimately becoming U.S. District Judge for District of Illinois. His birth family included several sisters who survived to adulthood and married, including Penelope Edwards Oldham (1769–1821), Jane Pope Field (1772–1852; also born in Fauquier County) and Hester Pope Edwards (1788–1868; born in Louisville). Both his parents had been born in Westmoreland County, Virginia, as had his grandfather Worden Pope (1705–1748) and great-grandfather Nathaniel "Bridges Pope III (1660–1719), although his grandmother Hester Netherton Pope was born in what was then Stafford County, Virginia.

John lost his arm during his youth and became known as "One-Arm Pope". He received a private education appropriate to his class, including at Salem Academy in Bardstown, Kentucky. He returned to Virginia and graduated from the College of William & Mary before returning to Kentucky and studying law in Lexington under George Nicholas, who had graduated from the same college before crossing the Appalachian mountains to Kentucky, where he not only practiced law but became the primary drafter of the 1792 Kentucky constitution. Pope moved to Springfield, Kentucky where he was admitted to the bar. He practiced law in Washington, Shelby, and Fayette counties.

== Political career ==
Pope served as the presidential elector from Kentucky in 1801, and was elected to the Kentucky House of Representatives in 1802. He served in the House again from 1806 to 1807.

Pope was elected as a Jeffersonian Republican to the United States Senate, serving from 1807 to 1813, and served as President pro tempore of the Senate during the Eleventh Congress in 1810 and 1811. His vote against the War of 1812 seemed logical since he leaned toward the Federalist Party at that time, but political gossip attributed this unpopular political stance to his wife's influence (Eliza Johnson Pope was daughter of an Englishwoman, Catherine Nuth, wife of Joshua Johnson, and she had spent much of her youth in England). The political fall-out led to his not running for re-election at the end of his term in 1813. He and his wife returned to live in Lexington, Kentucky where he practiced law and taught at Transylvania University.

Pope was appointed Secretary of State of Kentucky from 1816 to 1819, under Governor Gabriel Slaughter.

He served as a member of the Kentucky Senate from 1825 to 1829, and was also elected three times to the United States House of Representatives, initially as an independent and then as a Whig, serving Kentucky's District 7 between 1837 and 1843.

From 1829 to 1835, he served as the governor of Arkansas Territory. During his term as governor he arranged for the construction of the Old State House by the Kentucky architect Gideon Shryock. It remains the oldest surviving state capitol west of the Mississippi River.

== Personal life ==
Pope was married to three socially well-connected women over his lifetime - outliving them all. In 1795 he married Anne Henry Christian (d. 1806), daughter of one of the first settlers of Louisville, Kentucky and niece of Patrick Henry. After Anne died, and while a U.S. Senator, serving as president pro tem, he remarried in 1810. He married well again this time to Elizabeth Janet Dorcas Johnson (1786–1818), daughter of Joshua Johnson, the first American Consul-General to England. Her sister, Louisa, was the wife of John Quincy Adams, who was at that time the U.S. Minister to Prussia and later, with John Pope's support, president of the United States. During this time, and primarily under the advisement of his wife Eliza, Pope built the avant-garde mansion in what was then on the edges of the "Athens of the West," Lexington, Kentucky. It was designed by the noted American architect, Benjamin Henry Latrobe.

After the death of Eliza, Pope resigned from his position as secretary of state of Kentucky (under Governor Gabriel Slaughter) and law professor at Transylvania University, and in 1820 he moved to Springfield, Kentucky. Mrs. Frances Watkins Walton of Washington County (1772–1843), widow of General Matthew Walton, founder of Springfield and state politician. At the time of her marriage to John Pope, Mrs. Walton was one of the wealthiest people in the state. After his marriage, Pope lived in his wife's home, Walton Manor, and practiced law from the older brick cottage in front of the mansion. When his daughter married in 1829, he sold the Pope Villa which he had been leasing out, and he sold the Walton Manor to her husband John Watkins Cocke. Pope and his wife then moved to Arkansas where he served as Territorial Governor until 1835. He returned to Springfield with his wife, and they built a new house for themselves. This smaller house is also on the National Register of Historic Places. He served as a Kentucky representative to Congress from 1837 to 1843; but, soon before his third wife died, he was an unsuccessful candidate for reelection in 1842 to the Twenty-eighth Congress.

He was also the brother of Nathaniel Pope, a prominent figure in early Illinois Territory, and the uncle to both John Pope, Union General in the Civil War and Daniel Pope Cook, another prominent politician in the early history of the state of Illinois.

== Death ==
John Pope died in Springfield, Kentucky on July 12, 1845, and is buried in Springfield Cemetery there.

== Legacy ==
Pope Villa in Lexington, Kentucky was built by Benjamin Latrobe for him and his wife Eliza. It is only one of three extant Latrobe buildings in the U.S.

Pope County, Arkansas is named for him.

== See also ==
- Thomas S. Hinde, close friend and adviser.

U.S. Senate
Preceded by Henry Clay	U.S. senator (Class 3) from Kentucky; 1807-1813; Served alongside: Buckner Thruston, Henry Clay, George M. Bibb	Succeeded by Jesse Bledsoe
Political offices
Preceded by Charles Stewart Todd	Secretary of State of Kentucky; 1816—1819	Succeeded by Oliver G. Waggener
Preceded by John Gaillard	President pro tempore of the United States Senate; 1811	Succeeded by William H. Crawford
Government offices
Preceded by George Izard	Governor of Arkansas Territory; 1829–1835	Succeeded by William S. Fulton
U.S. House of Representatives
Preceded by Benjamin Hardin	United States Representative (district 7) from Kentucky; 1837–1843	Succeeded by William Thomasson
