= Frank's Island Light =

Lighthouse in Louisiana, US

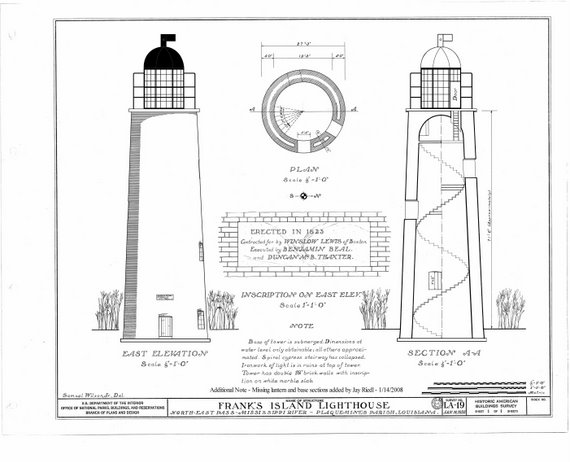
- HABS drawing of Frank's Island Light as built
- Location: Frank's Island in the Mississippi delta
- Coordinates: 29°8′30″N 89°1′24″W

Tower
- Constructed: 1823
- Construction: double-walled brick tower
- Shape: Conical

Light
- First lit: 1823
- Deactivated: 1855
- Lens: 18 lamps
- Characteristic: Fixed white

The Frank's Island Light was an early lighthouse in Louisiana, marking the entrance channel to the Mississippi River from the delta. Conceived of as a grand monument, it suffered from construction issues and was eventually abandoned as the channel it marked was supplanted by other routes.

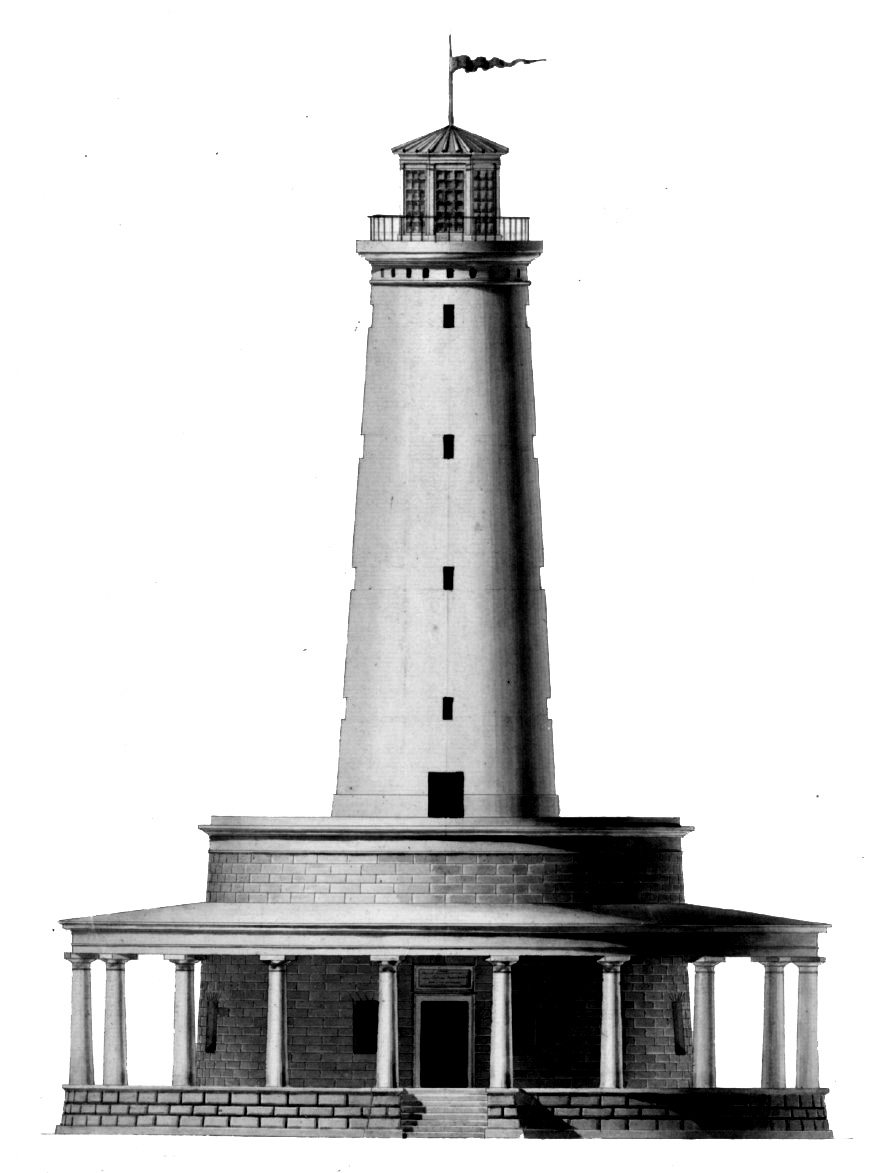
One of Latrobe's drawings for the proposed tower

== History ==
Funds for a light to mark the entrance to the Mississippi from the delta were appropriated in 1803 in the amount of $25,000, and plans were drawn up by Benjamin Latrobe; he designed an elaborate structure consisting of a tall central tower surrounded by a round house and colonnade, but the War of 1812 prevented work from going forward. After the war, in June 1816, a lighthouse commission was formed, including Peter Le Barbier Duplessis, Daniel Patterson, and architect Henry S. B. Latrobe, who revised his father's plans, but even at the then princely sum of $55,000 there was no taker for the work. Finally Winslow Lewis was persuaded to take on the work, and besides demanding $79,000 for the work, he stipulated that an inspector supervise the work to verify that the design was being followed.

Construction began in 1818, but early the following year the structure collapsed. Lewis drew up a third, much simpler design for a double-walled conical brick tower, for which he charged $10,000; construction resumed, using materials from the collapsed tower, and the light was first lit in 1823. It was the first of a number towers erected by Lewis, and at the time the tallest lighthouse on the gulf coast.

By the late 1850s the channel marked by the light was silting up, and a new light was erected to the north on Pass A L'Outre. The keeper of the Frank's Island Light moved to the new post, and the tower was abandoned. It stood for another 144 years before collapsing in 2002.
