= Sedgeley =

Historic house in Pennsylvania, United States

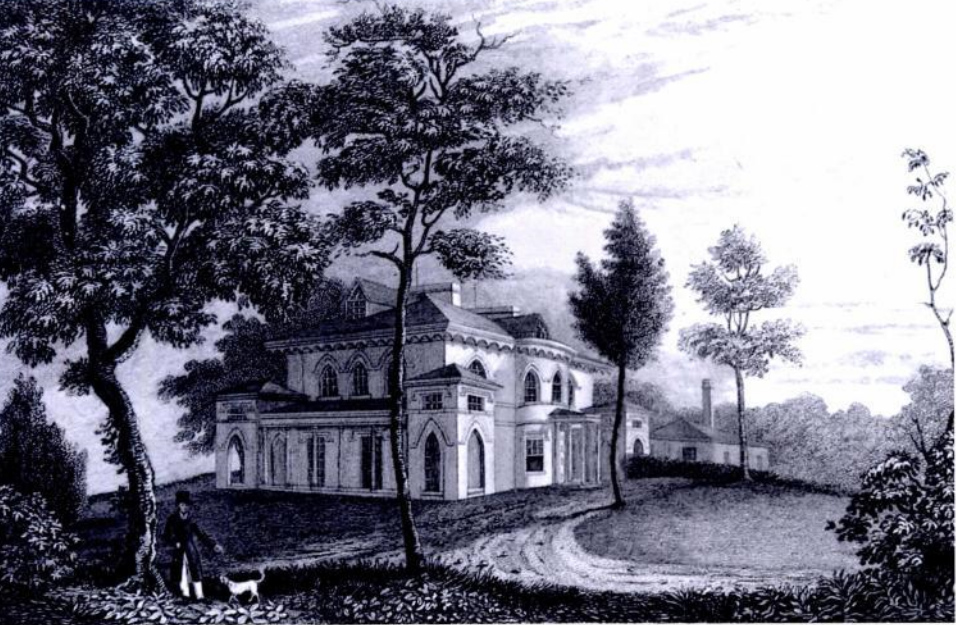
Engraving of Sedgeley House in Views in Philadelphia and its Environs (Philadelphia, 1830)

Sedgeley was a mansion, designed by the architect Benjamin Henry Latrobe, and built on the east banks of the Schuylkill River in Philadelphia, USA, in 1799–1802.

== Design and construction ==
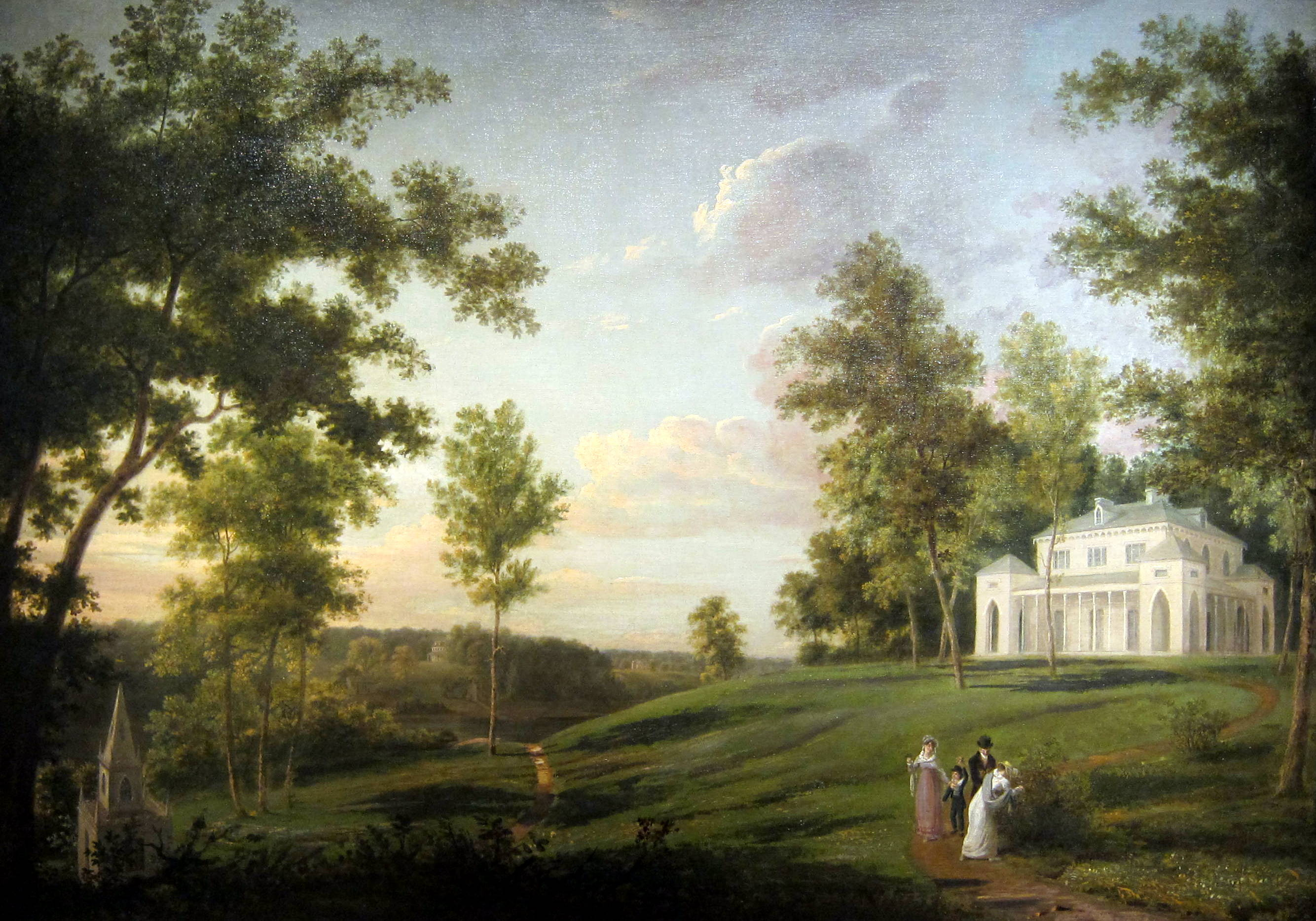
Sedgeley Park, 1819, oil painting by Thomas Birch

The land where the house was located was originally owned by Robert Morris, but was seized and auctioned off in 1799. William Cramond, a wealthy merchant, purchased the house. Immediately upon acquiring the land, Cramond hired Latrobe to improve the property and build the mansion, which was to serve as Cramond's country house. The mansion was situated on a hill overlooking the river, 80 feet below.

The two-story house, the first built in America in a Gothic Revival style, had a hip roof and dormers with steep roofs, and was approximately 75 ft in width and depth. Other Gothic elements included scalloped bargeboards on the eaves, and windows with label mouldings and other Gothic characteristics. The interior plan of the house was similar to the one that Latrobe used in John Harvie's home in Richmond, Virginia, and later, the John Markoe House in Philadelphia and the Pope Villa in Kentucky. The front of the house featured a portico, and a two-story entrance hall. Latrobe's design called for ashlar stone exterior walls, stone or brick window trim, and wooden construction for the piazza. Cramond did not retain Latrobe to provide on-site supervision of construction and did not entirely follow Latrobe's plan.

== Ownership ==
Cramond owned the mansion for a short period, as he was forced to sell it in 1806 due to bankruptcy. Another merchant, Samuel Mifflin, bought the Sedgeley mansion, but he then sold the house in 1812 to James Cowles Fisher, a shipping merchant, who used it as a summer residence. For some period of time, Fisher left the house vacant or leased it to a tenant. Fisher sold it in 1836 to Isaac S. Loyd, a real estate speculator, who decided to subdivide the house and did not take good care of it, letting it fall into disrepair.

The city of Philadelphia purchased the adjacent Lemon Hill property in 1844, which was turned into a public park. By setting aside open space along the river, Philadelphia hoped to better protect the city's water supply. A group of wealthy residents sought to expand the park to include the Sedgeley property, and they organized a fund to help achieve that. Though, the fund was short of the $70,000 needed, so through use of eminent domain, the city of Philadelphia paid the $45,000 balance and acquired the Sedgeley property in 1857. The house was demolished a short time later, and the land is now part of Fairmount Park.

== Porter House ==
Sedgeley Porter's House
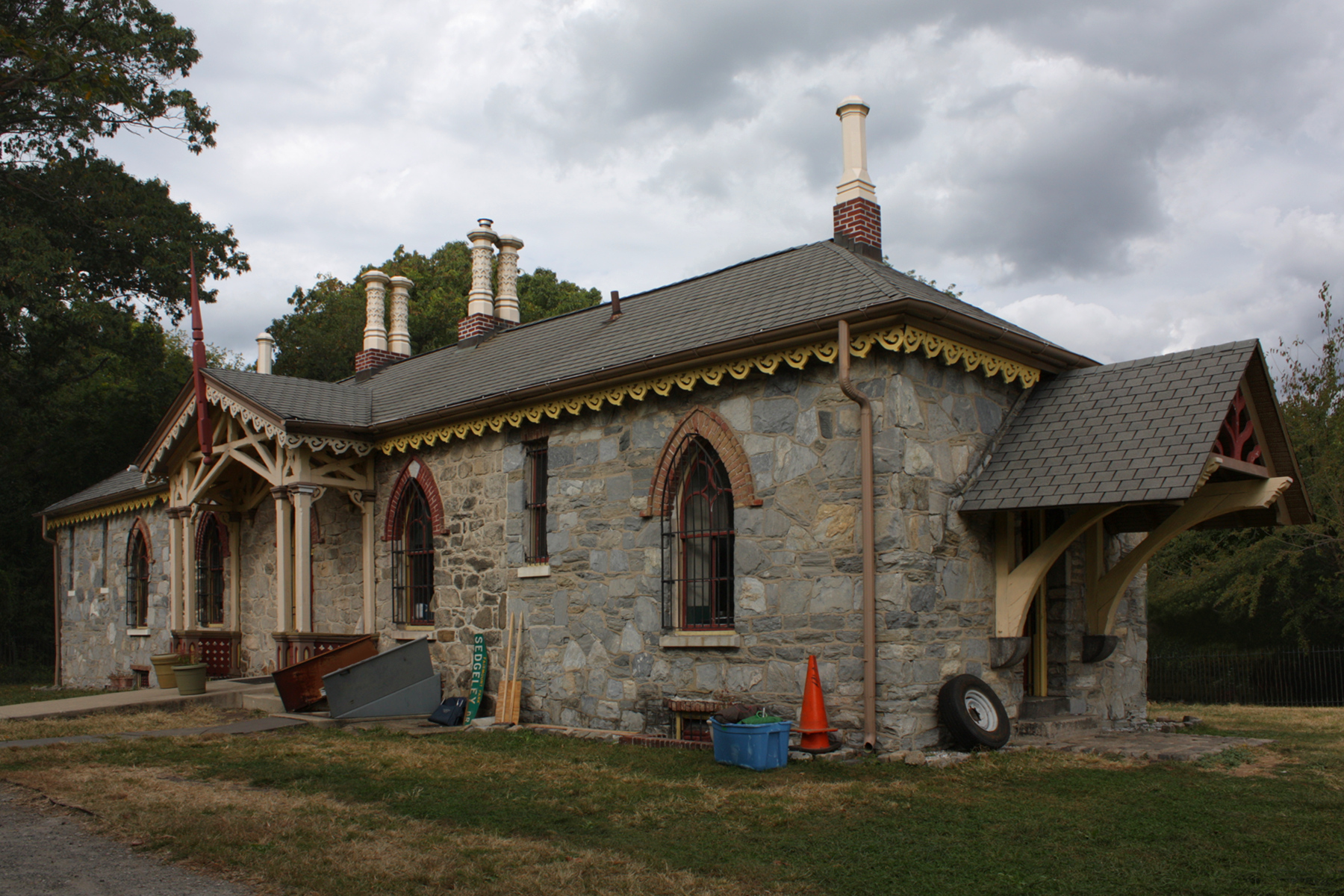
- Sedgeley Porter's House (2017)

- Location within Pennsylvania
- 39°58′28″N 75°11′20″W
- Location: Philadelphia, Pennsylvania

Site notes
- Architectural style: Gothic Revival

Philadelphia Register of Historic Places

The Sedgeley property also included a servant's cottage (the Porter's House), designed by Latrobe, which still exists. Though Latrobe spent nearly a decade in Philadelphia, designing numerous buildings, the Sedgeley cottage is the only building of his that remains in Philadelphia. For more than a century, the Porter's House was used by the Park Guard and served as a jail. It was rescued from demolition and converted to office space in the 1990s by the Fairmount Park Historic Preservation Trust and is currently occupied by Outward Bound.

== See also ==
- List of houses in Fairmount Park
