= List of shipwrecks in April 1875 =

The list of shipwrecks in April 1875 includes ships sunk, foundered, grounded, or otherwise lost during April 1875.

== 1 April ==
List of shipwrecks: 1 April 1875
Ship	State	Description
Ceres	France	The ship collided with Larenomm (Denmark) off the coast of Iceland and was wrecked. Her crew were rescued.
Italia	United Kingdom	The steamship ran aground in the Clyde at Dumbarton. She was refloated the next day.
Victoria	United Kingdom	The ship ran aground in the Clyde. She was on a voyage from New York, United States to the Clyde.

== 2 April ==
List of shipwrecks: 2 April 1875
Ship	State	Description
Audacia	Portugal	The barque was damaged by fire at Liverpool, Lancashire.
Kalamazoo	United Kingdom	The smack was run into by the steamship Dione (United Kingdom) and sank off the mouth of the River Tyne. Her crew were rescued by Dione. Kalamazoo was on a voyage from Lerwick, Shetland Islands to Newcastle upon Tyne, Northumberland.

== 3 April ==
List of shipwrecks: 3 April 1875
Ship	State	Description
Ada Florence	United Kingdom	The ship was driven ashore at Beachy Head, Sussex. She was on a voyage from Leith, Lothian to Granville, Manche, France. She was refloated and assisted in to Dover, Kent in a leaky condition.
Ennismore	United Kingdom	The steamship ran ashore at Lamlash, Isle of Arran. She was on a voyage from Glasgow, Renfrewshire to Dublin.
Irrawaddy	United Kingdom	The ship ran aground in the Yangtze. She was refloated.
Reval	Germany	The ship was wrecked on Bornholm, Denmark. Her crew were rescued. She was on a voyage from Kiel to Memel.
Westoe	United Kingdom	The steamship ran aground off Cape Sestos, Ottoman Empire. She was on a voyage from Alexandria, Egypt to Constantinople, Ottoman Empire. She was refloated with assistance from a tug.

== 4 April ==
List of shipwrecks: 4 April 1875
Ship	State	Description
Courier	Netherlands	The ship ran aground in the Nieuw Diep. She was on a voyage from Fuzhou, China to Amsterdam, North Holland.
Decca	United Kingdom	The ship was driven ashore at Blackgang Chine, Isle of Wight and was abandoned by her crew, who were reported missing. She was on a voyage from New York, United States to London. She broke up the next day.
Fu Sing, and Ocean	United Kingdom	The steamship Fusing collided with the steamship Ocean and sank in the South China Sea 120 nautical miles (220 km) north of "Shawiesan Island" with the loss of 69 of the 125 people on board. Survivors were rescued by Ocean. Fu Sing was on a voyage from Shanghai to Tianjin, China. Ocean was severely damaged. She was on a voyage from Niuzhuang to Shantou, China. She put in to Wusong, China.
Mimi	United Kingdom	The schooner struck the Megstone and sank. Her crew were rescued. She was on a voyage from Newcastle upon Tyne, Northumberland to Leith, Lothian.
Palma	Italy	The barque was wrecked on the Galloper Sand. Her crew were rescued by the fishing boat Etoile de Maria (France). Palma was on a voyage from Leith, Lothian, United Kingdom to Constantinople, Ottoman Empire.

== 5 April ==
List of shipwrecks: 5 April 1875
Ship	State	Description
Aios Constantinos	Greece	The brig was wrecked at the mouth of the Rio Pongas, Sierra Leone.
Alexander	United Kingdom	The steamship ran aground at "Wingoe". She was on a voyage from Malmö, Sweden to an English port. She was refloated and towed in to Copenhagen, Denmark by a steamship.
Callirhoe	United Kingdom	The ship was driven ashore on Walney Island, Lancashire. She was on a voyage from Calcutta, India to Barrow in Furness, Lancashire. She was refloated the next day and taken in to Barrow in Furness.
Catherine Boland	United Kingdom	The ship was driven ashore at "Boarshill", Fife and was abandoned by her crew.
Minnie	United Kingdom	The ship sank at Bamburgh Castle, Northumberland. Her crew were rescued. She was on a voyage from Sunderland, County Durham to Grangemouth, Stirlingshire.
Rapide	United Kingdom	The ship was severely damaged by ice and was beached at New York, United States. She was on a voyage from New York to London.
Velocipede	United Kingdom	The ship schooner was driven ashore at Moelfre, Anglesey. She was on a voyage from Runcorn, Cheshire to a Baltic port. She was refloated and found to be severely leaky.

== 6 April ==
List of shipwrecks: 6 April 1875
Ship	State	Description
Galera	United Kingdom	The steamship ran aground in the Clyde at Greenock, Renfrewshire.
Glasgow	United Kingdom	The steamship ran aground in the River Tay. She was on a voyage from Glasgow, Renfrewshire to Montrose, Forfarshire. She was refloated and taken in to Montrose in a leaky condition.
Iris	Norway	The barque was driven ashore and wrecked on the coast of Puerto Rico. She was on a voyage from Saint Thomas, Virgin Islands to Matanzas, Cuba.
Letezia	Italy	The barque collided with another vessel and sank off Monaco. Her crew were rescued.

== 7 April ==
List of shipwrecks: 7 April 1875
Ship	State	Description
Giorgios	Spain	The schooner was driven ashore near Almería. She was on a voyage from Marseille, Bouches-du-Rhône, France to Sant Lluís, Menorca.
Helen Beatrice	United Kingdom	The ship was driven ashore at Wigtown. She was on a voyage from London to Wigtown.
R. L. Alston	United Kingdom	The steamship was driven ashore. She was on a voyage from Middlesbrough, Yorkshire to Swansea, Glamorgan. She was refloated and put back to Middlesbrough.
Shamrock	United Kingdom	The schooner struck the Colley Rock, near Macduff, Aberdeenshire. She was refloated and taken in to Banff, Aberdeenshire in a leaky condition.

== 8 April ==
List of shipwrecks: 8 April 1875
Ship	State	Description
Antje	Netherlands	The schooner was driven ashore at Dysart, Fife, United Kingdom.
Frankland, and an unnamed vessel	United Kingdom; Flag unknown	The steamship Frankland collided with a schooner in the River Wear. Both vessels were severely damaged. Frankland was on a voyage from the Nieuw Diep to Sunderland, County Durham.
Haytien	United Kingdom	The ship ran aground at the Pass A L'Outre Lighthouse, Louisiana, United States. She was on a voyage from New Orleans, Louisiana, to Liverpool, Lancashire.
Petronella	Netherlands	The ship ran aground in the Bali Strait. She was on a voyage from Makassar, Netherlands East Indies to a Dutch port. She was refloated and towed in to Surabaya, Netherlands East Indies.
Statesman	Belgium	The barque ran aground on the Arklow Bank, in the Irish Sea off the coast of County Wicklow, United Kingdom and was wrecked. Her crew survived. She was on a voyage from Belfast, County Antrim, United Kingdom to New York, United States.
HMS Tamar	Royal Navy	The troopship ran aground at Kingstown, County Dublin. She was refloated and resumed her voyage.

== 9 April ==
List of shipwrecks: 9 April 1875
Ship	State	Description
Gomer	United Kingdom	The schooner struck the Swilly Rocks, in the Menai Strait and sank. Her crew were rescued. She was on a voyage from Caernarfon to Belfast, County Antrim.
Lina	Sweden	The brig ran aground on the Haisborough Sands, in the North Sea off the coast of, Norfolk, United Kingdom was abandoned. Her crew were rescued by the steamship Mount Stewart (United Kingdom). Lina was on a voyage from Kristiansand, Norway to Bordeaux, Gironde, France. She was discovered off Great Yarmouth, Norfolk the next day and taken in to Lowestoft, Suffolk, United Kingdom in a waterlogged condition.

== 10 April ==
List of shipwrecks: 10 April 1875
Ship	State	Description
Camiguin	Spain	The steamship ran aground and was abandoned in the Spanish East Indies. She was severely damaged.
Chiara	United Kingdom	The barque was damaged by fire at Penarth, Glamorgan.

== 11 April ==
List of shipwrecks: 11 April 1875
Ship	State	Description
Elaine	United Kingdom	The steamship was wrecked on the Haisborough Sands, in the North Sea off the coast of Norfolk. Her crew were rescued by the steamship Tanfield (United Kingdom). Elaine was on a voyage from the River Tyne to Dunkirk, Nord, France.
Reinhard	Flag unknown	The ship collided with the steamship Don Juan (United Kingdom) and sank off Cartagena, Spain. Her crew were rescued. Reinhard was on a voyage from an Italian port to Saint Petersburg, Russia. She was towed in to Cartagena in a waterlogged condition and placed under repair.

== 12 April ==
List of shipwrecks: 12 April 1875
Ship	State	Description
Belfont	France	The ship ran aground on the Goodwin Sands, Kent, United Kingdom. She was on a voyage from Newcastle upon Tyne, Northumberland, United Kingdom to Bahia, Brazil. She was refloated and assisted in to Ramsgate, Kent in a leaky condition.
Border Chieftain	United Kingdom	The steamship was driven ashore 2 nautical miles (3.7 km) west of Dover, Kent. She was on a voyage from Colombo, Ceylon to London. She was refloated on 23 April and taken in to Dover.
Guardian	United States	The full-rigged ship was driven ashore on Skagen, Denmark. She was on a voyage from Savannah, Georgia to Kronstadt, Russia. She was refloated and resumed her voyage.
Jane	United Kingdom	The schooner ran aground on the Haisborough Sands, in the North Sea off the coast of Norfolk. She was on a voyage from Middlesbrough, Yorkshire to Southampton, Hampshire. She floated off but consequently foundered. Her crew were rescued by the schooner Enterprise (United Kingdom).
Nancy	United Kingdom	The ship was driven ashore at Duncansby Head, Caithness.
Pomerania	Germany	The brig was run down and sunk off Terschelling, Friesland, Netherlands by the steamship West Riding (United Kingdom). Her crew were rescued. Pomerania was on a voyage from Porto, Portugal to Bremen.
Richard and Elizabeth	United Kingdom	The ketch was driven ashore and wrecked at Happisburgh, Norfolk. Her crew were rescued.
Sylphide	United Kingdom	The ship was driven ashore at Sheringham, Norfolk.

== 13 April ==
List of shipwrecks: 13 April 1875
Ship	State	Description
Florence	United Kingdom	The ship ran aground on the Long Bank, in the Irish Sea off the coast of County Wexford. She was on a voyage from Liverpool, Lancashire to St. Stephen, New Brunswick, Canada.
John Elder	United Kingdom	The steamship was severely damaged by fire at Birkenhead, Cheshire.

== 14 April ==
List of shipwrecks: 14 April 1875
Ship	State	Description
Antoinette	France	The ship ran aground and was wrecked in the Nunez River.
Denia	United Kingdom	The steamship ran aground at Malmö, Sweden. She was on a voyage from Sunderland, County Durham to Malmö. She was refloated and taken in to Malmö.
Esberne Snare	United Kingdom	The hulk was destroyed by fire and sank at Jiujiang, China.
Stuart Hahneman	United Kingdom	The ship capsized and sank in the Indian Ocean with the loss of 37 of her 46 crew. Survivors took to a lifeboat; they were rescued on 27 April by the barque Blandina I (Austria-Hungary). Stuart Hahneman was on a voyage from Bombay, India to Liverpool, Lancashire.
Victor	(United Kingdom of Great Britain and Ireland) Gibraltar	The brig ran aground and was wrecked at the mouth of the Scarcies River.

== 15 April ==
List of shipwrecks: 15 April 1875
Ship	State	Description
HMS Tamar	Royal Navy	The troopship ran aground at Gillingham, Kent. She was refloated with assistance.

== 17 April ==
List of shipwrecks: 17 April 1875
Ship	State	Description
Catharina	Russia	The ship was holed by ice and sank at Memel, Germany. Her crew were rescued.
Ernest	United Kingdom	The schooner was run down and sunk off Lundy Island by the steamship Meteor (United Kingdom) with the loss of all hands. Ernest was on a voyage from Ardrossan, Ayrshire to Bristol, Gloucestershire.
Maria Elizabeth	United Kingdom	The schooner was abandoned off the coast of County Wicklow in a sinking condition. Her crew were rescued.
Rival, and Rose	United Kingdom; France	The schooners collided in the North Sea off Hartlepool, County Durham and were abandoned by their crews, who were rescued by the schooner Arab (United Kingdom). Rival was on a voyage from South Shields, County Durham to Dartmouth, Devon. Rose was on a voyage from Newcastle upon Tyne, Northumberland to Quimper, Finistère.

== 18 April ==
List of shipwrecks: 18 April 1875
Ship	State	Description
Louise Bahlrus	United States	The ship was driven ashore at Málaga, Spain. She was on a voyage from Málaga to Williamsburg, Virginia. She was refloated with assistance.
Storsilden	Norway	The ship was driven ashore and wrecked at Lister. She was on a voyage from Newcastle upon Tyne, Northumberland, United Kingdom to Haugesund.
William Woodbury	United Kingdom	The ship was run into by the steamship Benledi (United Kingdom) in the Iloilo Strait and was beached. She was repaired and resumed her voyage.

== 19 April ==
List of shipwrecks: 19 April 1875
Ship	State	Description
Cora Linn	United Kingdom	The ship capsized in the Atlantic Ocean with the loss of for of her crew. Survivors were rescued on 22 April by an American barque and 23 April by the brig Ara (Norway). Cora Linn was on a voyage from Doboy, Georgia, United States to Troon, Ayrshire.
Einigkeit	Denmark	The ship was driven ashore at Thisted.
Jupiter T.	Austria-Hungary	The barque was driven ashore and wrecked at Point Padrone, Cape Colony. Her crew survived. She was on a voyage from Singapore, Straits Settlements to New York, United States.
Moldetz	Flag unknown	The ship ran aground off Esbjerg, Denmark.
Said	Flag unknown	The steamship ran aground and was severely damaged at Öckerö, Sweden. She was on a voyage from Sunderland, County Durham, United Kingdom to Gothenburg, Sweden.
Scotland	United Kingdom	The steamship sprang a leak and sank at Liverpool, Lancashire.
Success	United Kingdom	The steamship was driven ashore at Cape Arkona, Germany with some loss of life. She was on a voyage from South Shields, County Durham to Swinemünde, Germany. She was refloated and towed in to Swinemünde in a leaky condition.

== 20 April ==
List of shipwrecks: 20 April 1875
Ship	State	Description
Durley	United Kingdom	The ship was driven ashore at Kertch, Russia.
Great Western	United Kingdom	The steamship struck rocks at Crookhaven, County Cork. She was on a voyage from New York to Crookhaven. She was refloated.
Rose Brae	United Kingdom	The barque struck an iceberg and foundered in the Atlantic Ocean. Her crew were rescued by Thor (United Kingdom). Rose Brae was on a voyage from Galveston, Texas, United States to Liverpool, Lancashire.
Scotland	United Kingdom	The ship struck the quayside and sank at Liverpool. She was on a voyage from San Francisco, California, United States to Liverpool.

== 21 April ==
List of shipwrecks: 21 April 1875
Ship	State	Description
Thames	United Kingdom	The steamship was driven ashore at Newbiggin-by-the-Sea, Northumberland. She was on a voyage from Dunbar, Lothian to Blyth, Northumberland.
Venskabet	United Kingdom	The ship ran aground on the Goodwin Sands, Kent. She was on a voyage from Larvik, Norway to Miramichi, New Brunswick, Canada. She was refloated and resumed her voyage, but put in to Cowes, Isle of Wight.
Ventura	United States	The steamship was wrecked at Point Sur, California. Her passengers were rescued. She was on a voyage from San Francisco, California to a port in South Carolina.

== 22 April ==
List of shipwrecks: 22 April 1875
Ship	State	Description
Caroline	Belgium	The barque was abandoned in the Atlantic Ocean (37°16′N 58°27′W) with the loss of six of her thirteen crew. Five survivors were rescued. The remaining two were rescued the next day by Ada (United Kingdom), but one of them subsequently died. Caroline was on a voyage from Doboy, Georgia, United States to Troon, Ayrshire, United Kingdom.
Ich Dien	United Kingdom	The brigantine was driven ashore at Bahia, Brazil.
Marcus	Courland Governorate	The ship was driven ashore north of Vindava.
Maria	Germany	The schooner ran aground at Dragør, Denmark. She was on a voyage from Griefswald to Leith, Lothian, United Kingdom. She was refloated and towed in to Copenhagen, Denmark.
Von Laffert Lehsen	Sweden	The ship foundered in the North Sea. Her crew were rescued by Haufruen (Norway). Von Laffert Lehsen was on a voyage from Newcastle upon Tyne, Northumberland, United Kingdom to Stockholm.

== 23 April ==
List of shipwrecks: 23 April 1875
Ship	State	Description
Burgermeister van Settan	Germany	The ship ran aground at Pillau. She was on a voyage from Newcastle upon Tyne, Northumberland, United Kingdom to Königsberg. She was refloated and taken in to Königsberg for repairs.
Charles Bodman, Exporter, and John Kyle	United States	The steamboat John Kyle caught fire at New Orleans, Louisiana. The fire spread to Charles Bodman and Exporter with the loss of about 50 lives. John Kyle sank, the other boats were severely damaged.
Joseph Straker	United Kingdom	The steamship was driven ashore on Norderney, Germany. Her crew were rescued by the Norderney Lifeboat. She was on a voyage from Newcastle upon Tyne to Hamburg, Germany.
Limerick Lass	United Kingdom	The steamship was damaged by fire at Bremen, Germany.

== 24 April ==
List of shipwrecks: 24 April 1875
Ship	State	Description
Alabama	United States	The ship was abandoned in the Bay of Bengal. Her crew survived. She was on a voyage from Moulmein, Burma to Calcutta, India.
Ocean	United Kingdom	The barque ran aground at the White Cliffs, in the Dardanelles. She was on a voyage from South Shields, County Durham to Constantinople, Ottoman Empire. She was refloated with the assistance of a tug.
Prospero	Germany	The barque was driven ashore at Hela. She was on a voyage from Leith, Lothian, United Kingdom to Danzig.

== 25 April ==
List of shipwrecks: 25 April 1875
Ship	State	Description
Ada	United Kingdom	The schooner went ashore entering Rio Grande do Sul, Brazil, arriving from Genoa.
Familie Trouw	Netherlands	The galiot was wrecked on Anholt, Denmark. Her crew were rescued. She was on a voyage from an English port to Danzig, Germany.

== 26 April ==
List of shipwrecks: 26 April 1875
Ship	State	Description
Crystalline	United Kingdom	The barque ran aground at Dunkirk, Nord, France. She was on a voyage from Ardrossan, Ayrshire to Dunkirk. Also reported as Chrystaline running aground in the Castletown River, being refloated on 3 May and towed in to Dundalk, County Louth.
Marie Leonie	France	The brig ran aground on the Cross Sands, in the North Sea off the coast of Norfolk, United Kingdom. She was on a voyage from Sunderland, County Durham, United Kingdom to Boulogne, Pas-de-Calais. She was refloated and taken in to Great Yarmouth, Norfolk.
Nereide	United Kingdom	The ship was driven ashore on Anholt, Denmark. Her crew were rescued. She was on a voyage from Newcastle upon Tyne, Northumberland to Stockholm, Sweden. She was refloated and taken in to Helsingør, Denmark in a leaky condition.
Saxonia	United Kingdom	The ship ran aground at Grimsby, Lincolnshire. She was on a voyage from Grimsby to the West Indies. She was refloated the next day and resumed her voyage.

== 27 April ==
List of shipwrecks: 27 April 1875
Ship	State	Description
Albatross	United Kingdom	The ship ran aground at Dumfries. She was on a voyage from London to Dumfries. She was refloated.
Diadem, and Ville de Cadiz	United Kingdom; France	The steamship Ville de Cadiz collided with the steamship Diadem and sank in the Mediterranean Sea. She was on a voyage from Marseille, Bouches-du-Rhône to Oran, Algeria. Diadem was severely damaged and was left with a severe leak. She was on a voyage from Bombay, India to Liverpool, Lancashire.
Ernestine	United Kingdom	The ship was driven ashore and wrecked in Lough Swilly. She was on a voyage from Greenock, Renfrewshire to Quebec City, Canada.
Floral Star	South Australia	The ship ran aground at Yankakilla. She was declared a total loss.
Islander	United Kingdom	The brig collided with the brig Ryno (Norway) and sank off the Eddystone Lighthouse, Cornwall. Her crew were rescued by Ryno. Islander was on a voyage from Llanelly, Glamorgan to Portsmouth, Hampshire.
Mary Ann Scott	United Kingdom	The ship ran aground in the River Nith. She was on a voyage from Runcorn, Cheshire to Dumfries.
Remembrance	United Kingdom	The brig was driven ashore near Varberg, Sweden. Her crew were rescued. She was on a voyage from Hartlepool, County Durham to Wismar, Germany.
Sarah Ann	United Kingdom	The ship was abandoned 15 nautical miles (28 km) north of the Calf of Man, Isle of Man. Her crew were rescued by a tug.
Strathnaver	United Kingdom	The ship departed from Sydney, New South Wales for London. No further trace, presumed foundered with the loss of all hands.

== 28 April ==
List of shipwrecks: 28 April 1875
Ship	State	Description
Diadem	United Kingdom	The ship ran aground off "China Buckeer". She was on a voyage from Kurrachee, India to Rangoon, Burma. She was refloated on 4 May and taken in to Rangoon.
Lavarellini Fratelli	India	The ship was wrecked on the Eastern Sand, off Rangoon. Her crew were rescued. She was on a voyage from Singapore, Straits Settlements to Rangoon.
Remus	Flag unknown	The steamship struck a sunken rock off Cape Bon, Algeria. She was on a voyage from Odesa, Russia to Antwerp, Belgium. She put in to Malta in a leaky condition.
Quorn	United Kingdom	The ship ran aground off "China Buckeer". She was refloated on 4 May and taken in to Rangoon.

== 29 April ==
List of shipwrecks: 29 April 1875
Ship	State	Description
Edward Eccles	United Kingdom	The steamship ran aground at Harssens, Groningen, Netherlands. She was refloated and taken in to Texel, North Holland, Netherlands.
Ida	United Kingdom	The steamship ran aground at Rosetta, Egypt. Her crew were rescued. She was refloated in May and towed in to Alexandria, Egypt in a leaky condition.

== 30 April ==
List of shipwrecks: 30 April 1875
Ship	State	Description
Dragoon	United Kingdom	The steamship ran aground at "Strubben", Denmark. She was on a voyage from Copenhagen, Denmark to Newcastle upon Tyne, Northumberland. She was refloated on 3 May and put back to Copenhagen.
Sarinio	Italy	The schooner ran aground on the Banco Chico, in the River Plate. Her crew were rescued.

== Unknown date ==
List of shipwrecks: Unknown date in April 1875
Ship	State	Description
Anglesey	United Kingdom	The ship ran aground in the Hooghly River. She was refloated 36 hours later and taken in to Calcutta.
HMS Asp	Royal Navy	The paddle steamer sank in the River Medway.
HMS Beagle	Royal Navy	The Beagle-class schooner ran aground on a reef in the Spanish East Indies. Her crew were rescued.
Cornwallis	United Kingdom	The ship was wrecked on Pitcairn Island. Her crew survived. She was on a voyage from San Francisco, California, United States to Liverpool, Lancashire.
Elisor	Denmark	The schooner was abandoned in the North Sea 120 nautical miles (220 km) off Flamborough Head, Yorkshire, United Kingdom on or before 6 April.
Eros	United Kingdom	The ship was wrecked on "Chinchona Islet". She was on a voyage from Saint Thomas, Virgin Islands to Matanzas, Cuba.
Eva	Spain	The brigantine was destroyed by fire near Rosario, Argentina.
Figli Apap	Flag unknown	The ship was wrecked at "Krways", Russia. Her crew were rescued.
Firdar	Norway	The ship was driven ashore at wrecked at Leba, Germany. She was on a voyage from St. Ubes, Portugal to Danzig, Germany.
Giovanni B.	Italy	The brig collided with Kong Carl (Norway) and sank. Her crew were rescued.
Gustavo	Argentina	The ship ran aground near San Pedro, Buenos Aires. She was on a voyage from Cardiff, Glamorgan, United Kingdom to Buenos Aires. She had been refloated by 12 April and taken in to Buenos Aires.
Hagarstown	Flag unknown	The full-rigged ship caught fire at New Orleans, Louisiana, United States and was scuttled.
Halfdan	Germany	The ship was abandoned at sea before 10 April. Her crew were rescued. She was on a voyage from Port of Spain, Trinidad to Stettin.
Helmi	United Kingdom	The brig ran aground at Lagos, Lagos Colony and was severely damaged. She was consequently condemned.
Jane Wheaton	United Kingdom	The ship ran aground at Saint Lucia. She was refloated and towed in to Castries in a leaky condition.
J. C. Call	United States	The fishing schooner left Gloucester, Massachusetts for the Georges Bank and vanished on her maiden voyage. Some sources cites she was lost in February. Lost with all 12 crew.
La Fontaine	France	The steamship was driven ashore at Port-au-Prince, Haiti. She was on a voyage from Port-au-Prince to Le Havre, Seine-Inférieure. She was refloated and put back to Port-au-Prince for repairs, being severely leaky.
Maria Douglas	United Kingdom	The ship foundered in a hurricane at "FiH".
Morning Light	United States	The ship was wrecked near Matanzas, Cuba before 7 April. She was on a voyage from New York to Matanzas.
Myrtle	France	The barque was wrecked on the coast of Patagonia, Argentina on or before 2 April. All on board were rescued.
Payta	United Kingdom	The paddle steamer ran aground at "Santa" and was beached.
Penelope	United Kingdom	The ship ran aground at Maassluis, South Holland, Netherlands. She was on a voyage from Rotterdam, South Holland to a Mediterranean port. She was refloated and resumed her voyage.
Polykarp	Norway	The barque was driven ashore at Scituate, Massachusetts, United States. She was on a voyage from Newcastle upon Tyne, Northumberland, United Kingdom to Boston, Massachusetts.
Rankeillor	United Kingdom	The schooner was wrecked in the Black Sea.
Rosa Lavarello	Italy	The ship was wrecked at "Dolgoi", Russia. Her crew were rescued.
Somerset	United Kingdom	The ship ran aground at and was wrecked "Trichendore" on or before 24 April. She was on a voyage from Cochin to Tuticorin, India.
State of Virginia	United Kingdom	The steamship ran aground near Mokha, Aden Colony. She was on a voyage from London to Shanghai, China. She was refloated and resumed her voyage.
Uhla	Sweden	The ship ran aground on the Selskgrundet. She was on a voyage from Hull, Yorkshire to Stockholm. She was refloated and taken in to "Hirhamra".
Viking	United Kingdom	The ship ran aground off Bombay, India. She was on a voyage from London to Hong Kong. She was refloated two days later and resumed her voyage.
Waterloo	United Kingdom	The ship collided with a dredge boat and ran aground at the Pass A L'Outre Lighthouse, Louisiana, United States. She was on a voyage from New Orleans to Liverpool. She was consequently condemned.
