= Giambattista Scandella =

Giambattista Scandella (1770–1798) was an Italian physician and scientist who emigrated to the United States in 1796. Scandella studied medicine at the University of Padua, and then went into medical practice in Venice in 1786. He also conducted agricultural research on fertilizer and other topics.

Scandella was appointed as Secretary of the Venetian Embassy, serving in London. With experience abroad, Scandella had interest in American. He went to Quebec in 1796, and then settled in Philadelphia. There, he became an acquaintance of President George Washington and Benjamin Rush, and was a friend of architect Benjamin Henry Latrobe. He was elected to the American Philosophical Society in April 1798.

At the time in Philadelphia, there was great animosity between the Federalists and Thomas Jefferson's Democratic-Republican Party. Scandella was a libertarian and radical, and feared for his freedom and safety from John Adams' Federalists. In 1798, he decided to return to Europe, and headed to New York City to seek ocean passage. In traveling through swampy areas of New Jersey, he contracted yellow fever and was very sick when he arrived in New York. An acquaintance, Elihu Hubbard Smith, provided a place for him to stay and Scandella died there on September 17.
