= Pass A L'Outre Light =

Lighthouse in Louisiana, US

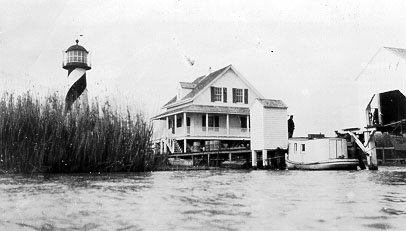
- undated photograph of Pass A L'Outre Light (USCG), after 1919
- Location: east end of Pass A L'Outre in the Mississippi delta
- Coordinates: 29.1901°N 89.0371°W

Tower
- Constructed: 1852
- Foundation: stone, timber
- Construction: Cast iron tower with brick lining
- Shape: Conical
- Markings: black; white spiral daymark added in 1919; White/black Barber's pole

Light
- First lit: 1855
- Deactivated: 1930
- Focal height: varied (see text)
- Lens: 3rd Order Fresnel lens
- Characteristic: Fixed red (1902) (Note: In the 1850s, it had a fixed white light. From 1858 the characteristic was 90 seconds, and in 1865 through 1902 it was 45 seconds.)

The Pass A L'Outre Light (or Pass a Loutre Light) is a defunct lighthouse in the Birdfoot Delta in Louisiana, United States, located near the mouth of the Mississippi River. Erected to mark the then-active entrance to the river, it was abandoned as that channel silted up. It has been in the path of several noteworthy hurricanes, and was heavily damaged. It is on the Lighthouse Digest Doomsday List, and is critically in danger. The lighthouse is at the center of a nature preserve.

== History ==
This light was erected to replace the old Frank's Island Light, which was abandoned when the neighboring channel became unnavigable. Rather than construct a new tower, in 1855 the iron tower of the Head of Passes Light was moved to a point near the mouth of Pass A L'Outre, the channel of the Mississippi River extending east from Head of Passes, and equipped with a third order Fresnel lens. The first keeper, John Lory, had most recently been keeper at the now deactivated light.

When constructed at Head of Passes in 1852, it was America's tallest cast iron lighthouse. It became apparent that such a tall light was unneeded there, and it was moved in 1855 to its present location. Originally the tower was 85 feet (26 m) tall; it has sunk into the mud and is about 40 feet (12 m) as of 2017.

At the outset of the Civil War Confederate forces removed the lamp and burned the stored lamp oil, and in 1862 burned the keeper's dwelling as well. Union forces returned and removed the lens, and in 1863 they regained control, built a new dwelling, and restored the light to operation. At the same time the outside of the tower was painted with coal tar.

By 1868 the tower was sinking into the mud of the delta: originally the beacon stood at 77 feet (23 m) above mean low water; by 1886 this was reduced to 65 feet (20 m) and to 59 feet (18 m) in 1920. The tower was settling evenly and no action was taken, other than raising the floor of the tower and cutting a new door in the side. (Note: "With less than half of its original height showing above ground, the metal tower continues to be ever so slowly swallowed up by the marshlands of the Birdfoot Delta. Around 2007, the lantern room, loosened by Hurricane Katrina, fell off the tower. It will be only a matter of time before Pass a l’Outre Lighthouse, true to its name, passes beyond.")

In 1871, a steam fog whistle was added; it was discontinued in 1880. The steam fog signals were authorized by an appropriation Act of Congress in 1871 in the amount of $10,000.00.

A 1917 hurricane damaged the dwelling and its outbuildings, and it was raised again; another door was cut in the tower as well. Two years later the black tower was repainted with a spiral Barber's pole black and white daymark pattern, similar to that on the Cape Hatteras Light. By this time Pass A L'Outre had become much shallower, and the light was deactivated and abandoned in 1930, though it was used for a time as lookout for smugglers before the end of prohibition. Steven Coludrevich, Assistant Keeper of the light was the recipient of a special award. bestowed by the Director of Commerce, for excellent service under extreme adverse conditions during the hurricane.

By act of Congress in 1934, the Secretary of Commerce was authorized to deed the lighthouse reservation to the State of Louisiana for state park purposes.

Although Hurricane Katrina did not overturn it, the lantern was loosened. By 2007 the tower was decapitated, its lantern having fallen into the water. The tower remains, bereft of its lantern and rusty, sunk deep into the swamp around it.

The lighthouse is listed on the Lighthouse Digest Doomsday List as being highly endangered.

The light is accessible only by boat, but the tower is closed. It is owned by U.S. Fish and Wildlife Service. The Delta National Wildlife Refuge is the site manager.

== See also ==
- Pass a Loutre Wildlife Management Area
