= Henry Sellon Latrobe =

American architect

Henry Boneval Sellon Latrobe
- Born: July 19, 1792; London, England
- Died: September 3, 1817 (aged 25); New Orleans, Louisiana, U.S.
- Resting place: Saint Louis Cemetery Number 1, New Orleans, Orleans Parish, Louisiana
- Occupation: Architect
- Notable work: The Orleans Ballroom, Christ Church New Orleans and Charity Hospital
- Father: Benjamin Henry Latrobe
- Relatives: Julia Latrobe (sister), John H. B. Latrobe (brother), Benjamin Henry Latrobe II (brother)

Henry Sellon Boneval Latrobe (1792–1817) was an American architect noted for his work in and around New Orleans, Louisiana.

He was the eldest son of Benjamin Henry Latrobe and his first wife, Lydia Sellon. Latrobe was educated at St. Mary's College in Baltimore, Maryland, and joined his father's firm upon graduation. Among Latrobe's works were the first Christ Church New Orleans, the fourth Charity Hospital building, and the Frank's Island Light.

== Death ==
Latrobe died of yellow fever on September 3, 1817, while supervising the construction of the New Orleans waterworks designed by his father. He was interred along with his father, at Saint Louis Cemetery Number 1, New Orleans, Orleans Parish, Louisiana.
