= Pope Villa =

Historic house in Kentucky, United States

Coordinates: 38.039476°N 84.495796°W

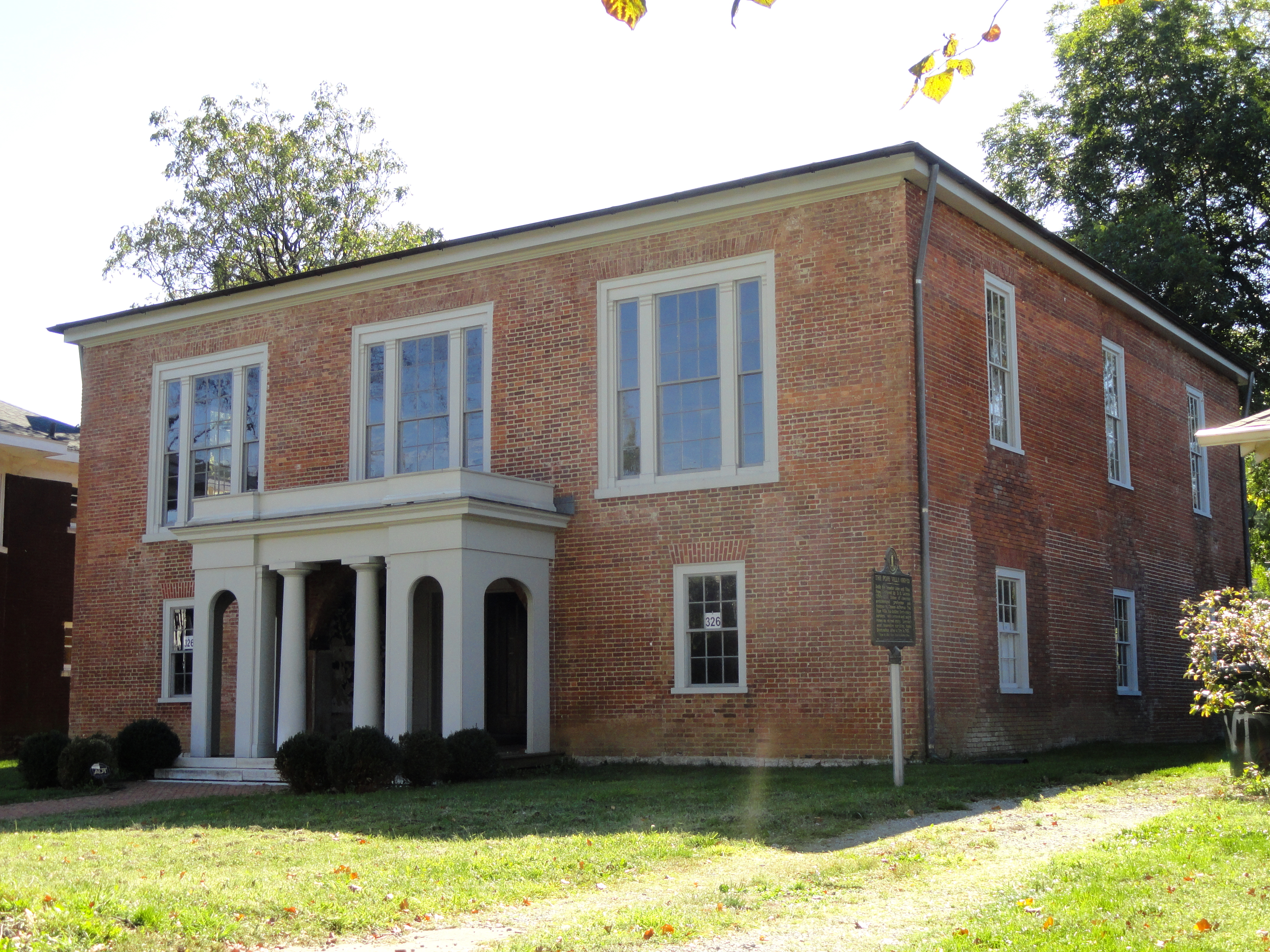
- Interactive map of the Pope Villa area

General information
- Type: Mansion
- Location: Lexington, Kentucky; United States, 326 Grosvenor Avenue
- Construction started: 1811
- Owner: The Blue Grass Trust For Historic Preservation

The Pope Villa in Lexington, Kentucky, USA, was designed by Benjamin Henry Latrobe in 1811 for Senator John Pope. It is one of only three extant Latrobe residences in the United States. As one of Latrobe's most avant-garde designs, the Pope Villa has national significance for its architect and unique design.

Purchased in 1987 by the Blue Grass Trust for Historic Preservation, the Pope Villa underwent restoration in the 2010s to reflect its 1811 original construction appearance. It was listed on the National Register of Historic Places in 2018.
