= Benjamin Henry Latrobe =

English-American architect (1764-1820)

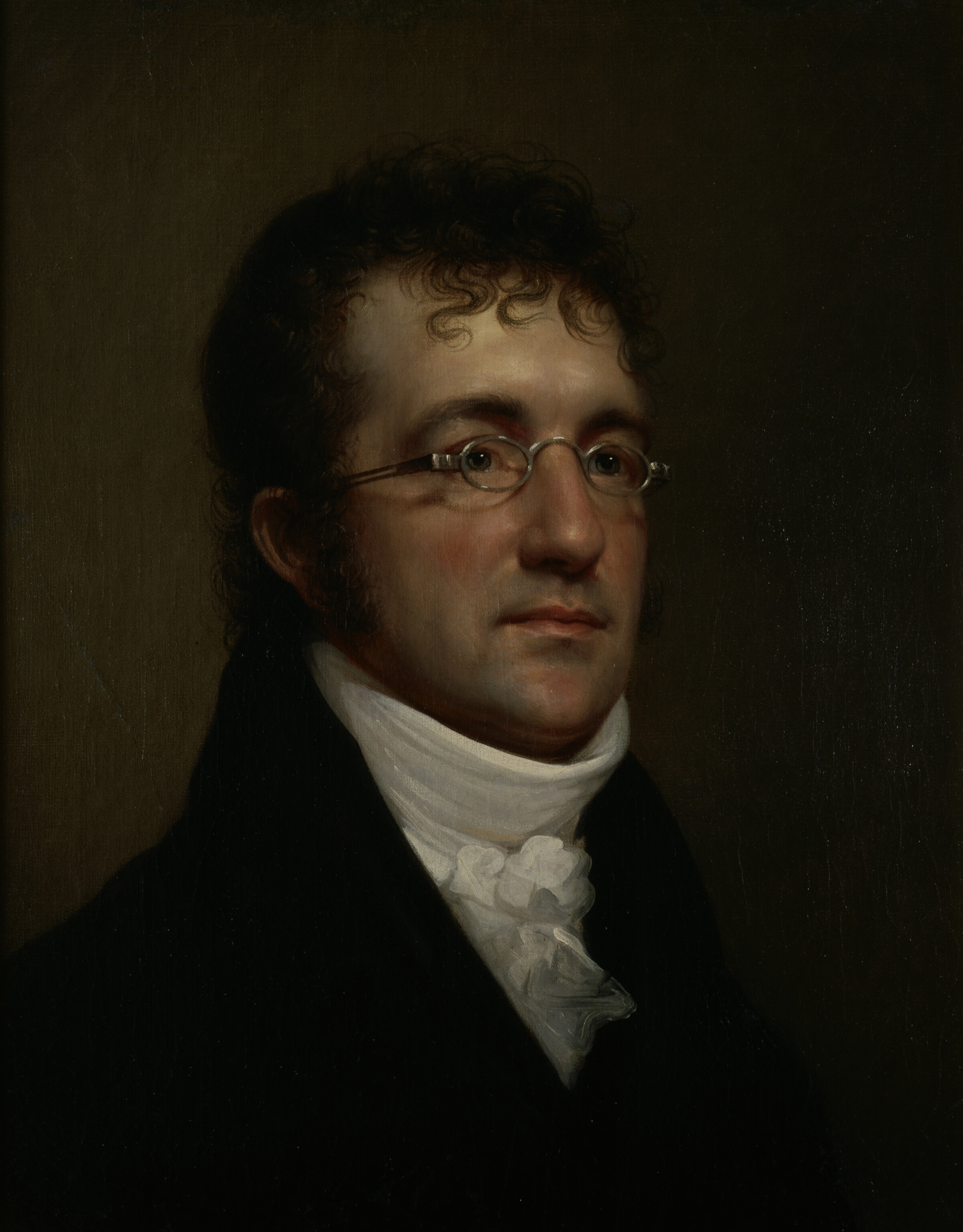
- Portrait by Rembrandt Peale, c. 1815.

Architect of the Capitol
- In office April 6, 1815 – November 20, 1817
- President: James Madison; James Monroe
- Preceded by: Himself
- Succeeded by: Charles Bulfinch
- In office March 6, 1803 – July 1, 1811
- President: Thomas Jefferson; James Madison
- Preceded by: William Thornton
- Succeeded by: Himself

Personal details
- Born: May 1, 1764 Fulneck, Leeds, West Riding of Yorkshire, England, Great Britain
- Died: September 3, 1820 (aged 56) New Orleans, Louisiana, U.S.
- Spouses: Lydia Sellon (m. 1790; died 1793) Mary Elizabeth Hazlehurst (m. 1800)
- Relations: Christian Ignatius Latrobe (brother); Charles Hazlehurst Latrobe (grandson); Ferdinand Claiborne Latrobe (grandson); Charles La Trobe (nephew)
- Children: Henry; Benjamin II; John
- Known for: Hammerwood Park, Ashdown House, East Sussex, Decatur House, Pope Villa, Old West, Dickinson College, Adena Mansion, Baltimore Basilica, United States Capitol, White House porticos

Benjamin Henry Boneval Latrobe (May 1, 1764 – September 3, 1820) was a British-American neoclassical architect who immigrated to the United States. He was one of the first formally trained, professional architects arriving in the newly independent United States, drawing on influences from his travels in Italy, as well as British and French Neoclassical architects such as Claude Nicolas Ledoux. In his thirties, he immigrated to the new United States and designed the United States Capitol, on "Capitol Hill" in Washington, D.C., as well as the Old Baltimore Cathedral or The Baltimore Basilica, (later renamed the Basilica of the National Shrine of the Assumption of the Blessed Virgin Mary). It is the first Cathedral constructed in the United States for any Christian denomination. Latrobe also designed the largest structure in America at the time, the "Merchants' Exchange" in Baltimore. With extensive balconied atriums through the wings and a large central rotunda under a low dome which dominated the city, it was completed in 1820 after five years of work and endured into the early twentieth century.

Latrobe immigrated to America from England in 1796, initially settling in Virginia where he worked on the Virginia State Penitentiary in Richmond. Latrobe then moved to Philadelphia where he established his practice. In 1803, he was hired as Surveyor of the Public Buildings of the United States, and spent much of the next fourteen years working on projects in the new national capital of Washington, D.C., where he served as the second architect of the Capitol. He also was responsible for the design of the White House porticos. Latrobe spent the later years of his life in New Orleans, Louisiana working on a waterworks project, and died there in 1820 from yellow fever.

Latrobe has been called the "father of American architecture". He was the uncle of Charles La Trobe, who was the first lieutenant-governor of Victoria in Australia.

== Biography ==
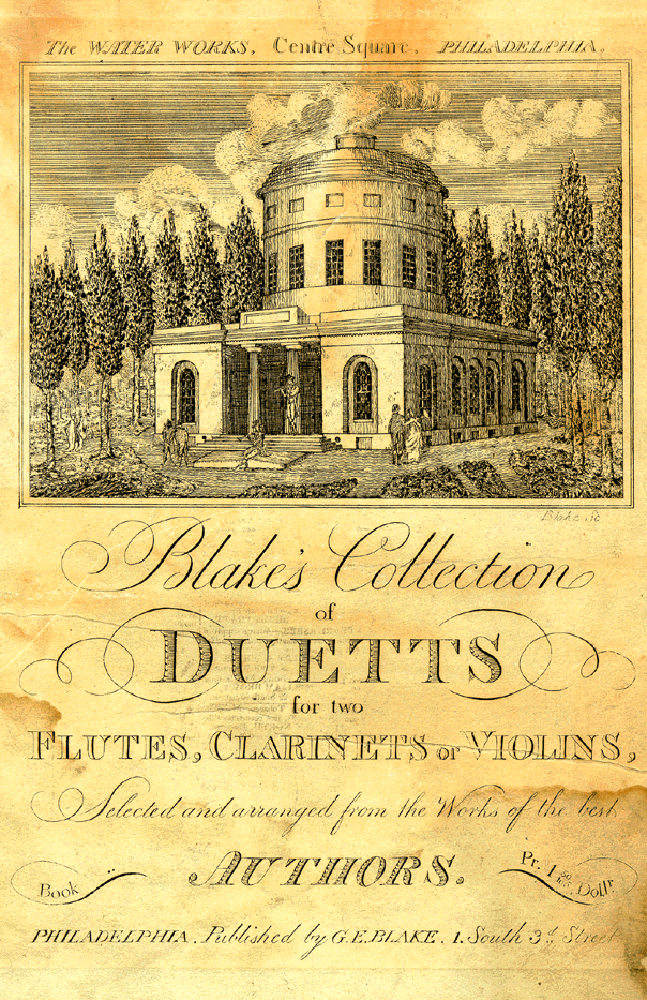
An engraving (c. 1807) by George E. Blake of Latrobe's Center Square Water Works in Philadelphia

Latrobe was born on May 1, 1764, at the Fulneck Moravian Settlement, near Pudsey in the city of Leeds, in the West Riding of Yorkshire, England. His parents were Benjamin Latrobe, a leader of the Moravian Church who was of Huguenot (French Protestant) ancestry, and Anna Margaretta Antes whose father was German and whose maternal line was Dutch. Antes was born in the American colony of Pennsylvania, but was sent to England by her father, a wealthy landowner, to attend a Moravian school at Fulneck.

Latrobe's father, who was responsible for all Moravian schools and establishments in Britain, had an extensive circle of friends in the higher ranks of society. He stressed the importance of education, scholarship, and the value of social exchange; while Latrobe's mother instilled in her son a curiosity and interest in America. From a young age, Benjamin Henry Latrobe enjoyed drawing landscapes and buildings. He was a brother of Moravian leader and musical composer Christian Ignatius Latrobe.

In 1776, at the age of 12, Latrobe was sent away to the Moravian School at Niesky in Silesia near the border of Saxony and Prussia. At age eighteen, he spent several months traveling around Germany, and then joined the Royal Prussian Army, becoming close friends with a distinguished officer in the United States Army. Latrobe also may have served briefly in the Austrian Imperial Army, and suffered some injuries or illness. After recovering, he embarked on a continental "Grand Tour", visiting eastern Saxony, Paris, Italy, and other places. Through his education and travels, Latrobe mastered German, French, ancient and modern Greek, and Latin. He had advanced ability in Italian and Spanish and some knowledge of Hebrew. Latrobe was elected a member of the American Antiquarian Society in 1815.

His son, Benjamin Henry Latrobe, II, (sometimes referred to as "Junior"), also worked as a civil engineer. In 1827, he joined the newly organized Baltimore and Ohio Railroad and designed the longest, most challenging bridge on its initial route: the curving Thomas Viaduct, (the third of four multi-arched "viaducts").

Another son, John Hazlehurst Boneval Latrobe (1803–1891), was a noted civic leader, lawyer, author, historian, artist, inventor, sometime architect, intellectual, and social activist in Maryland While Park Commissioner for the City of Baltimore he co-founded the Baltimore Zoo. Among his inventions and patents, he invented the Latrobe Stove, also known as the "Baltimore Heater", a cast iron coal fired parlor heater.

A grandson, Charles Hazlehurst Latrobe (1834–1902), Benjamin Henry Latrobe II's son, continued the tradition of architect and engineer building bridges for the city of Baltimore and for the Baltimore and Ohio Railroad. Charles Hazlehurst fought on the side of the Confederacy during the American Civil War.

Another grandson, Ferdinand Claiborne Latrobe, was a seven-term mayor of Baltimore.

Latrobe Park in south Baltimore is named for the family, as is Latrobe Park, New Orleans, in the French Quarter.

== Travels ==
=== England ===
Latrobe returned to England in 1784, and was apprenticed to John Smeaton, an engineer known for designing Eddystone Lighthouse. Then in 1787 or 1788, he worked in the office of neoclassical architect Samuel Pepys Cockerell for a brief time. In 1790, Latrobe was appointed Surveyor of the Public Offices in London, and established his own private practice in 1791. Latrobe was commissioned in 1792 to design Hammerwood Lodge, near East Grinstead in Sussex, his first independent work, and he designed nearby Ashdown House in 1793. Latrobe was involved in construction of the Basingstoke Canal in Surrey, together with engineers John Smeaton and William Jessop. In spring 1793, Latrobe was hired to plan improvements to the River Blackwater from Maldon to Beeleigh, so that the port of Maldon could compete with the Chelmer and Blackwater Navigation, which bypassed the town. The project lasted until early 1795, when Parliament denied approval of his plan. Latrobe had problems getting payment for his work on the project, and faced bankruptcy.

In February 1790, Latrobe married Lydia Sellon, and they lived a busy social life in London. The couple had a daughter (Lydia Sellon Latrobe) and a son (Henry Sellon Boneval Latrobe), before she died giving birth during November 1793. Lydia had inherited her father's wealth, which in turn was to be left to the children through a trust with the children's uncles, but never ended up going to the children. In 1795, Latrobe suffered a breakdown and decided to immigrate to America, departing on November 25 aboard the Eliza.

In America, Latrobe was known for his series of topological and landscape watercolors; the series started with a view of the White Cliffs of the south coast of England viewed from the Eliza. The series was preceded by a watercolor of East Grinstead, dated September 8, 1795.

=== Virginia ===
Latrobe arrived in Norfolk, Virginia, in mid-March 1796 after a harrowing four-month journey aboard the ship, which was plagued with food shortages under near-starvation conditions. Latrobe initially spent time in Norfolk, where he designed the "William Pennock House," then set out for Richmond in April 1796. Soon after arriving in Virginia, Latrobe became friends with Bushrod Washington, nephew of President George Washington, along with Edmund Randolph and other notable figures. Through Bushrod Washington, Latrobe was able to pay a visit to Mount Vernon to meet with the President in the summer of 1796.

Latrobe's first major project in the United States was the Virginia State Penitentiary in Richmond, commissioned in 1797. The penitentiary included many innovative ideas in penal reform, then being espoused by Thomas Jefferson and various other figures, including cells arranged in a semicircle, that allowed for easy surveillance, as well as improved living conditions for sanitation and ventilation. He also pioneered the use of solitary confinement in the Richmond penitentiary. While in Virginia, Latrobe worked on the Green Spring mansion near Williamsburg, which had been built by Governor Sir William Berkeley in the seventeenth century but fell into disrepair after the American Revolutionary War. Latrobe created designs for Fort Nelson in Virginia in 1798. He also made drawings for a number of houses that were not built, including the "Mill Hill" plantation house near Richmond.

After spending a year in Virginia, the novelty of being in a new place wore off, and Latrobe was lonely and restless in Virginia. Giambattista Scandella, a friend, suggested Philadelphia as an ideal location for him. In April 1798, Latrobe visited Philadelphia for the first time, meeting with Bank of Pennsylvania president Samuel J. Fox, and presented to him a design for a new bank building. At the time, the political climate in Philadelphia was quite different than Virginia, with a strong division between the Federalists and Jefferson's Democratic-Republicans, along with anti-French sentiment, thus the city was not entirely welcoming for Latrobe. On his way to Philadelphia, Latrobe passed through the national capital city of Washington, D.C., then under construction (congress and the president would not arrive until the year 1800), where he met with the first architect of the capitol, William Thornton, and viewed the United States Capitol for the first time. He stopped by Washington again on his way back to Richmond. Latrobe remained in Richmond, Virginia, until November 1798, when his design was selected for the Bank of Pennsylvania. He moved to Philadelphia, so that he could supervise the construction, although he continued to do occasional projects for clients in Virginia.

=== Philadelphia ===
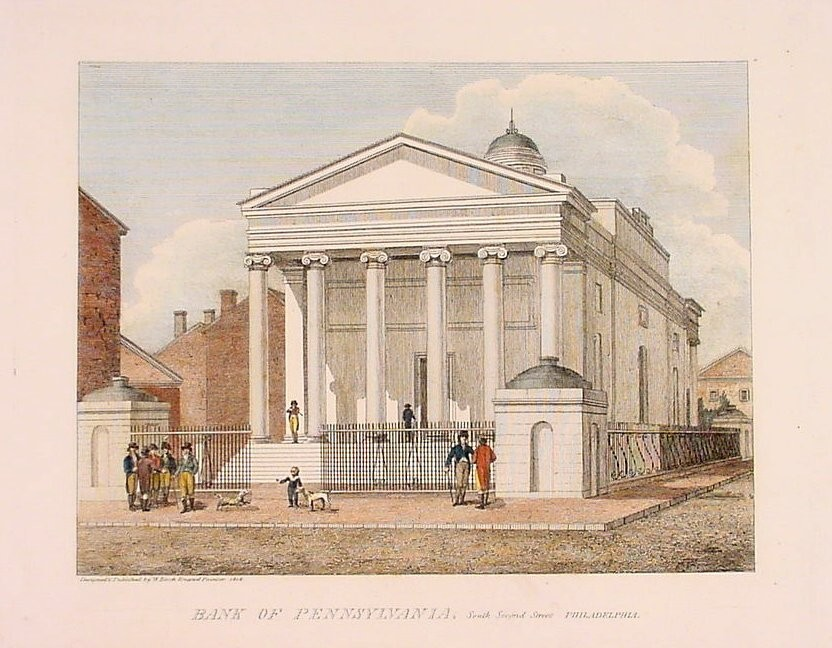
Bank of Pennsylvania, Philadelphia. Engraving by William Russell Birch.

By the time he arrived in Philadelphia, Latrobe's two friends, Scandella and Volney, had left due to concerns regarding the Alien and Sedition Acts, but Latrobe made friends with some of their acquaintances at the American Philosophical Society. Latrobe submitted several papers to the society, on his geology and natural history observations, and became a member of the society in 1799. With his charming personality, Latrobe quickly made other friends among the influential financial and business families in Philadelphia, and became close friends with Nicholas Roosevelt, a talented steam-engine builder who would help Latrobe in his waterworks projects.

Latrobe's first major project in Philadelphia was to design the Bank of Pennsylvania, which was the first example of Greek Revival architecture in the United States. It was demolished in 1870. This commission is what convinced him to set up his practice in Philadelphia, where he developed his reputation.

Latrobe also was hired to design the Center Square Water Works in Philadelphia. The Pump House, located on the common at Broad and Market Streets (now the site of Philadelphia City Hall), was designed by Latrobe in a Greek Revival style. It drew water from the Schuylkill River, 1-mile (1.6 km) away, and contained two steam engines that pumped it into wooden tanks in its tower. Gravity then fed the water by wooden mains into houses and businesses. Following his work on the Philadelphia water works project, Latrobe worked as an engineer of the Chesapeake and Delaware Canal.

In addition to Greek Revival designs, Latrobe also used Gothic Revival designs in many of his works, including the 1799 design of Sedgeley, a country mansion in Philadelphia. The Gothic Revival style was used in Latrobe's design of the Philadelphia Bank building as well, which was built in 1807 and demolished in 1836. As a young architect, Robert Mills worked as an assistant with Latrobe from 1803 until 1808 when he set up his own practice.

While in Philadelphia, Latrobe married Mary Elizabeth Hazlehurst (1771–1841), in 1800. The couple had several children together.

=== Washington, D.C. ===
In the United States, Latrobe quickly achieved eminence as the first professional architect working in the country. Latrobe was a friend of Thomas Jefferson, influencing Jefferson's design for the University of Virginia. Latrobe also knew James Monroe, as well as New Orleans architect and pirate, Barthelemy Lafon, was Aaron Burr's preferred architect, and he trained architect William Strickland.

In 1803, Jefferson hired Latrobe as Surveyor of the Public Buildings of the United States, and to work as superintendent of construction of the United States Capitol. As construction of the capitol was already underway, Latrobe was tasked to work with William Thornton's plans, which Latrobe criticized. In an 1803 letter to Vice President Aaron Burr, he characterized the plans and work done as "faulty construction". Nonetheless, President Jefferson insisted that Latrobe follow Thornton's design for the capitol.

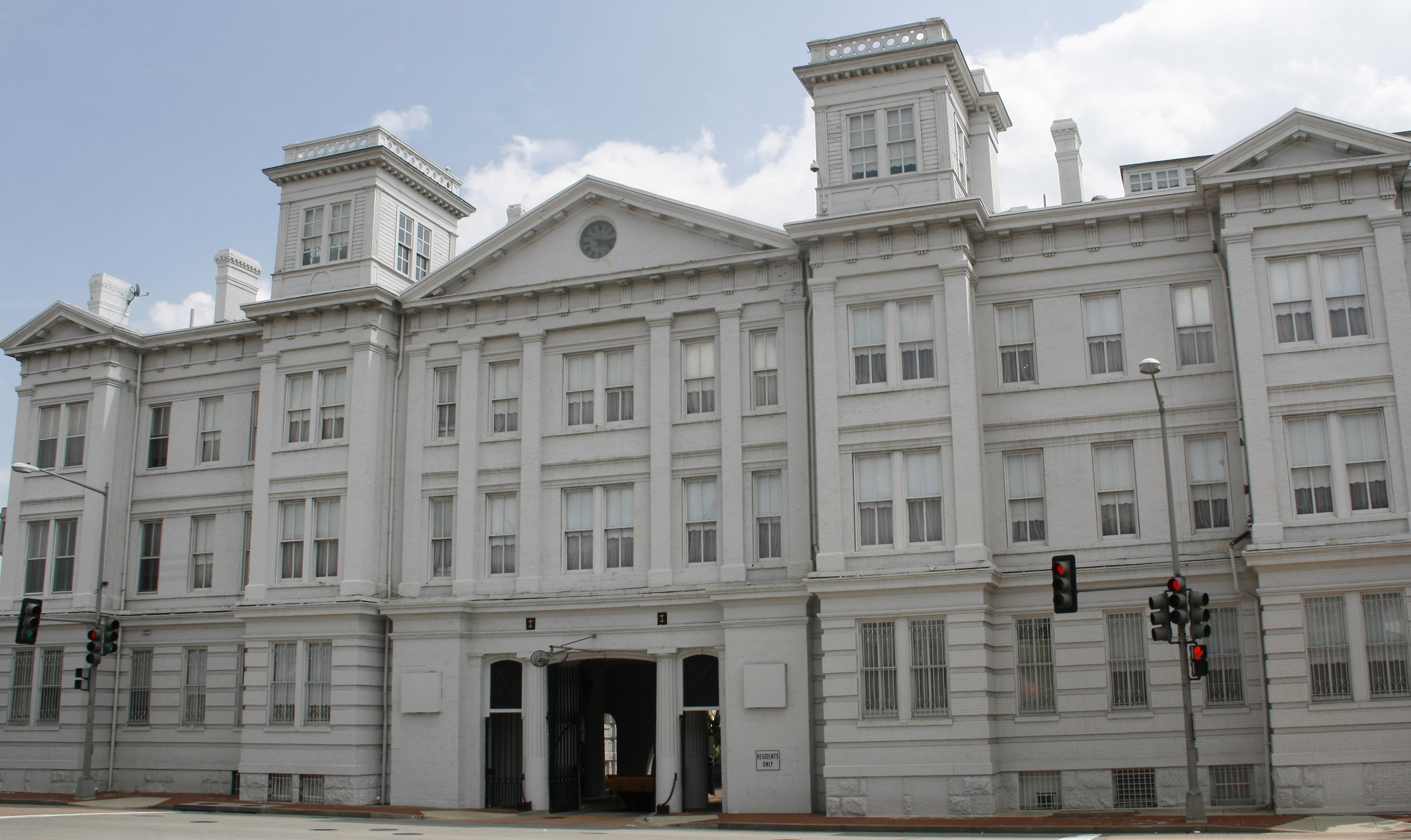
Latrobe Gate at the Washington Navy Yard

Although Latrobe's major work was overseeing construction of the United States Capitol, he also was responsible for numerous other projects in Washington. In 1804, became chief engineer in the United States Navy. As chief surveyor, Latrobe was responsible for the Washington Canal. Latrobe faced bureaucratic hurdles in moving forward with the canal, with the directors of the company rejecting his request for stone locks. Instead, the canal was built with wooden locks, which were subsequently destroyed in a heavy storm in 1811. Latrobe also designed the main gate of the Washington Navy Yard. Latrobe worked on other transportation projects in Washington, D.C., including the Washington and Alexandria Turnpike, which connected Washington with Alexandria, as well as a road connecting with Frederick, Maryland, and a third road, the Columbia Turnpike going through Bladensburg to Baltimore. Latrobe also provided consulting on the construction of the Washington Bridge across the Potomac River in a way that would not impede navigation and commerce to Georgetown.

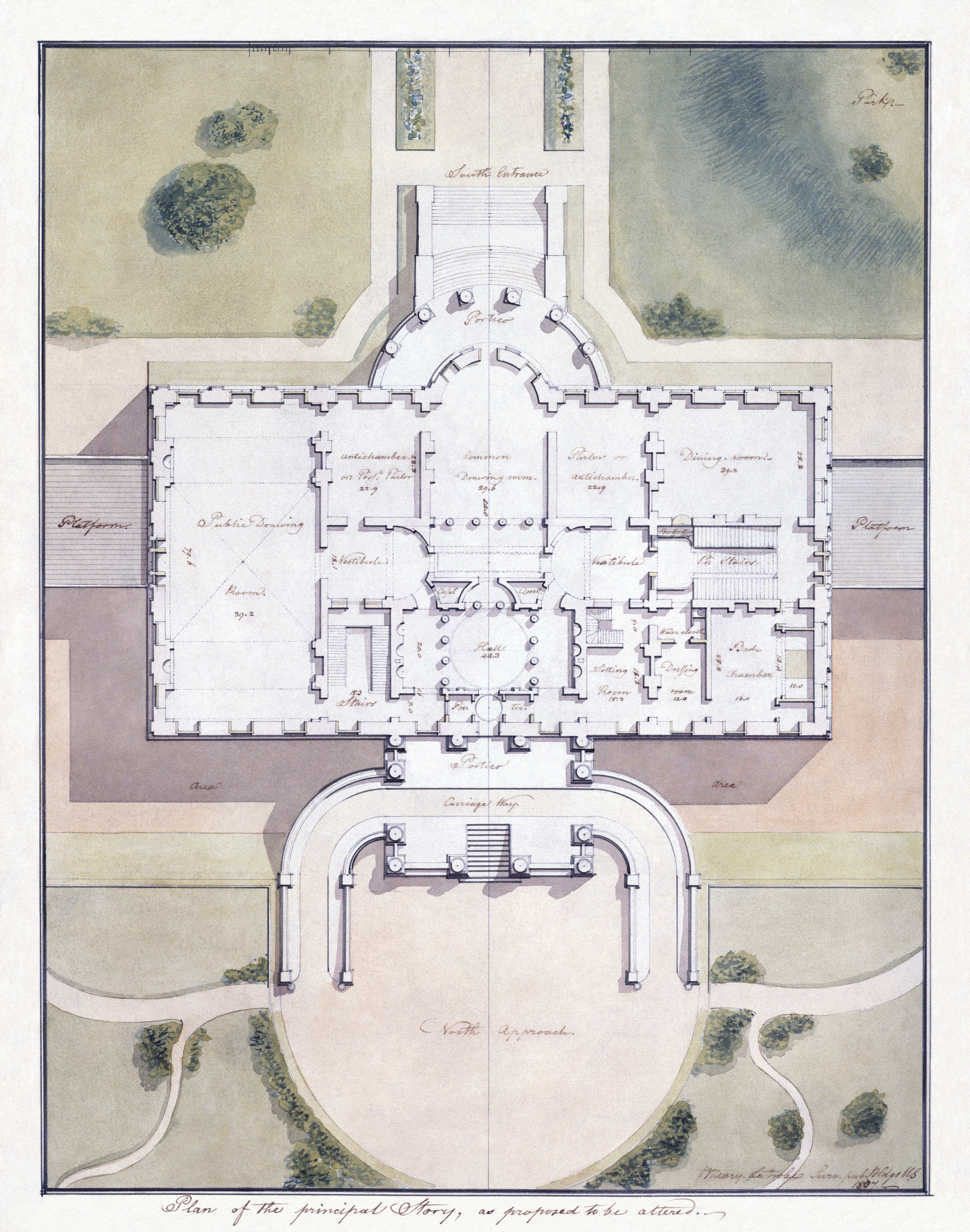
Principal story plan for the White House by Benjamin Henry Latrobe, 1807

Benjamin Latrobe was responsible for several other projects located around Lafayette Square, including St. John's Episcopal Church, Decatur House, and the White House porticos. Private homes designed by Latrobe include commissions by John P. Van Ness and Peter Casanove.

In June 1812, construction of the Capitol came to a halt with the outbreak of the War of 1812 and the failure of the First Bank of the United States. During the war, Latrobe relocated to Pittsburgh, and returned to Washington in 1815, as Architect of the Capitol, charged with responsibility of rebuilding the capitol after it was destroyed in the war. Latrobe was given more freedom in rebuilding the capitol, to apply his own design elements for the interior. Through much of Latrobe's time in Washington, he remained involved with his private practice to some extent and with other projects in Philadelphia and elsewhere. His clerk of works, John Lenthal, often urged Latrobe to spend more time in Washington.

By 1817, Latrobe had provided President James Monroe with complete drawings for the entire building. He resigned as Architect of the Capitol on November 20, 1817, and without this major commission, Latrobe faced difficulties and was forced into bankruptcy. Latrobe left Washington, for Baltimore in January 1818.

Latrobe left Washington with pessimism, with the city's design contradicting many of his ideals. Latrobe disliked the Baroque-style plan for the city, and other aspects of Pierre Charles L'Enfant's plan, and resented having to conform to Thornton's plans for the Capitol Building. One of the greatest problems with the overall city plan, in the view of Latrobe, was its vast interior distances, and Latrobe considered the Washington Canal as a key factor that, if successful, could help alleviate this issue. Latrobe also had concerns about the city's economic potential, and argued for constructing a road connecting Washington with Frederick to the northwest to enhance economic commerce through Washington.

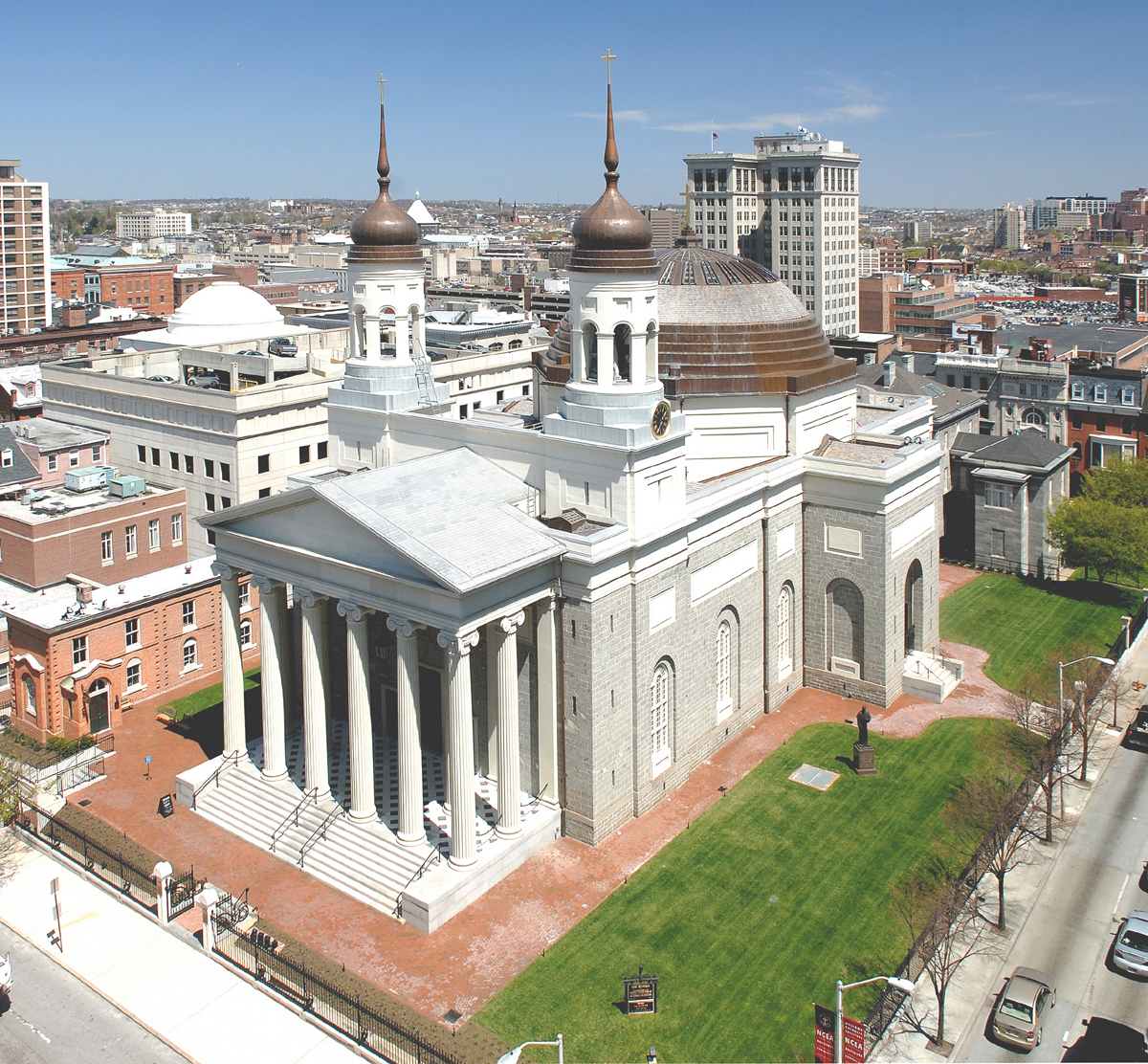
Basilica of the National Shrine of the Assumption of the Blessed Virgin Mary in Baltimore, Maryland

=== New Orleans ===
Latrobe saw great potential for growth in New Orleans, situated at the mouth of the Mississippi River, with the advent of the steamboat and great interest in steamboat technology. Latrobe's first project in New Orleans was the first New Orleans United States Customs building, constructed in 1807.

In 1810, Latrobe sent his son, Henry Sellon "Boneval" Latrobe, to the city to present a plan for a waterworks system to the New Orleans city council. Latrobe's plan for the waterworks system was based on that of Philadelphia, which he earlier designed. The system in Philadelphia was created as a response to yellow fever epidemics affecting the city. Latrobe's system used steam pumps to move water from the Schuylkill River to a reservoir, located upstream; so that gravity could be used to transmit the water from there to residents in the city. The New Orleans waterworks project also was designed to desalinate water, using steam-powered pumps. While in New Orleans, Latrobe's son participated in the Battle of New Orleans against British forces in 1815, and took on other projects including building a lighthouse, a new Charity Hospital, and the French Opera House.

New Orleans agreed to commission the waterworks project in 1811, although Latrobe was not ready to take on the project immediately and faced financial problems in securing enough investors for the project. His work on the United States Capitol was completed shortly before the War of 1812 started, ending his source of steady income. During the war Latrobe unsuccessfully tried several wartime schemes to make money, including some steamboat projects. In 1814, Latrobe partnered with Robert Fulton in a steamship venture based at Pittsburgh. While in Pittsburgh, Latrobe designed and built a theater for the Circus of Pepin and Breschard. After British forces briefly occupied Washington in August 1814 and burned several federal buildings, Latrobe remained in Washington to help with rebuilding, and Latrobe's son took on much of the work for the New Orleans waterworks project.

Latrobe faced further delays trying to get an engine built for the waterworks, which he finally accomplished in 1819. The process of designing and constructing the waterworks system in New Orleans spanned eleven years. In addition to this project, Latrobe designed the central tower of the St. Louis Cathedral, which was his last architectural project.

Latrobe died September 3, 1820, from yellow fever, while working in Louisiana. He was buried in the Protestant section of the Saint Louis Cemetery in New Orleans, where his eldest son, architect Henry Sellon Boneval Latrobe (1792–1817), had been buried three years earlier, having also succumbed to yellow fever.

== Architecture ==
=== Influences ===
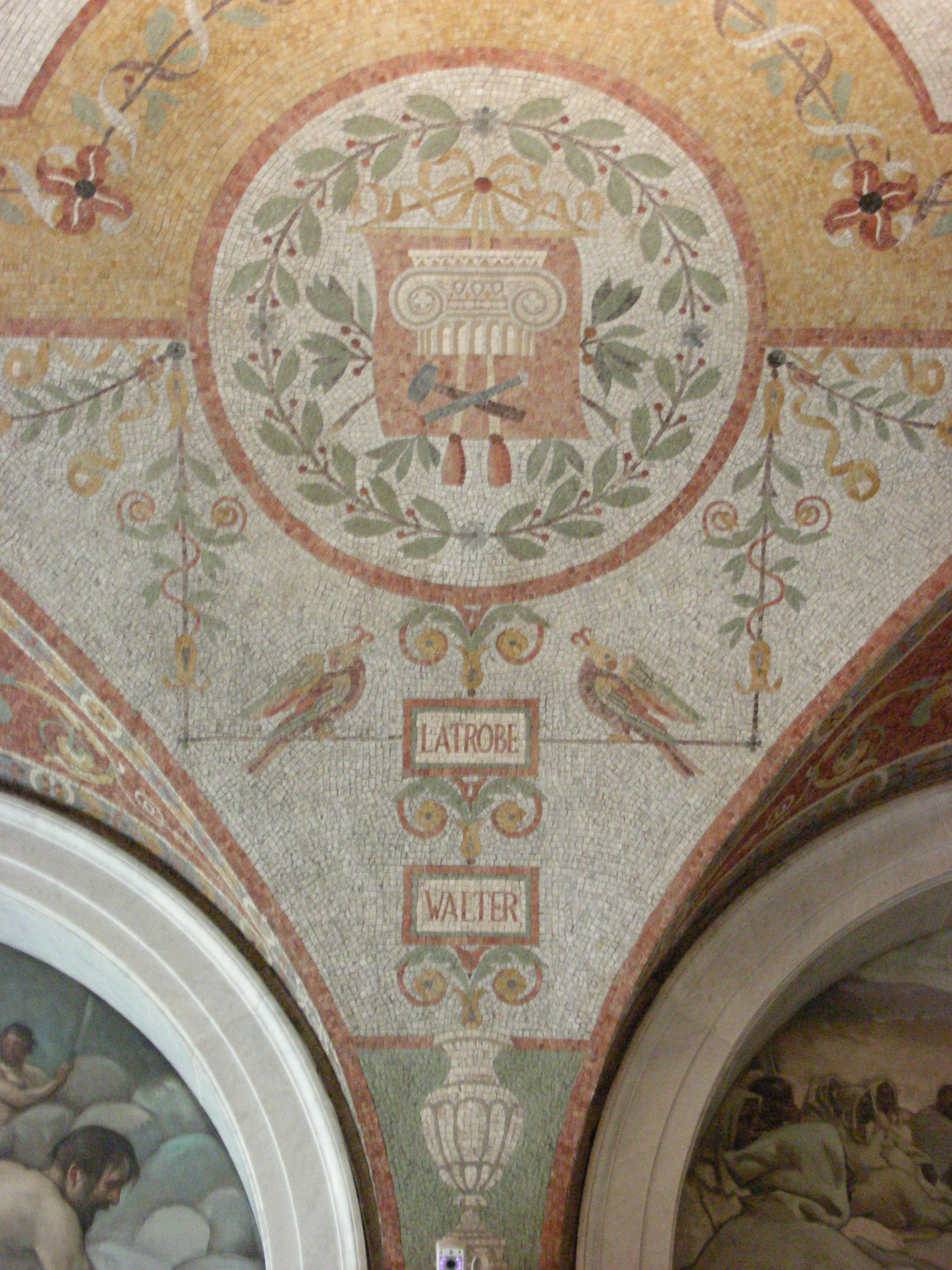
For his architectural accomplishments, Benjamin Latrobe is honored, together with Thomas U. Walter, in a ceiling mosaic in the East Mosaic Corridor at the entrance to the Main Reading Room of the Library of Congress.

While studying in Germany, Latrobe was mentored by Baron Karl von Schachmann, a classical scholar interested in art and collecting. Around 1783, Latrobe made the decision to become an architect, a decision influenced by the Baron. While Latrobe was in Germany, a new architectural movement, led by Carl Gotthard Langhans and others, was emerging with return to more Classical or Vitruvian designs.

In 1784, Latrobe set off on a Grand Tour around Europe, visiting Paris where the Panthéon, a church dedicated to St. Genevieve, was nearing completion. The Panthéon in Paris, designed by Jacques Germain Soufflot and Jean-Baptiste Rondelet, represented an early example of Neoclassicism. At that time, Claude Nicolas Ledoux was designing numerous houses in France, in Neoclassical style. Latrobe also visited Rome, where he was impressed by the Pantheon and other ancient structures with Greek influence. Influential architects in Britain, at the time when Latrobe returned in 1784, adhered to a number of different styles. Sir William Chambers was at the forefront, designing in Palladian style, while Chambers' rival, Robert Adam's designs had Roman influence, in a style known as Adam style. Latrobe was not interested in either the Palladian nor Adam style, but Neoclassicalism also was being introduced to Great Britain at the time by George Dance the Younger. Other British architects, including John Soane and Henry Holland, also designed in the Neoclassical style while Latrobe was in London.

During his European tour, Latrobe gathered ideas on how American cities should be designed. He suggested city blocks be laid out as thin rectangles, with the long side of the blocks oriented east–west so that as many houses as possible could face south. For a city to succeed, he thought it needed to be established only in places with good prospects for commerce and industrial growth, and with a good water supply.

Public health was another key consideration of Latrobe, who believed that the eastern shores of rivers were unhealthy, due to prevailing direction of the wind, and recommended cities be built on the western shores of rivers.

=== Greek Revival in America ===
Latrobe brought from England influences of British Neoclassicism, and was able to combine it with styles introduced by Thomas Jefferson, to devise an American Greek Revival style. John Summerson described the Bank of Pennsylvania, as an example of how Latrobe "married English Neo-Classicism to Jeffersonian Neo-Classicism [and] ... from that moment, the classical revival in America took on a national form". The American form of Greek Revival architecture that Latrobe developed became associated with political ideals of democracy—a meaning that was less apparent in Britain. The direct link between the Greek Revival architecture and American democracy has been disputed by recent scholars such as W. Barksdale Maynard, who sees the Greek Revival as an international phenomenon.

== Selected works ==
=== Houses ===
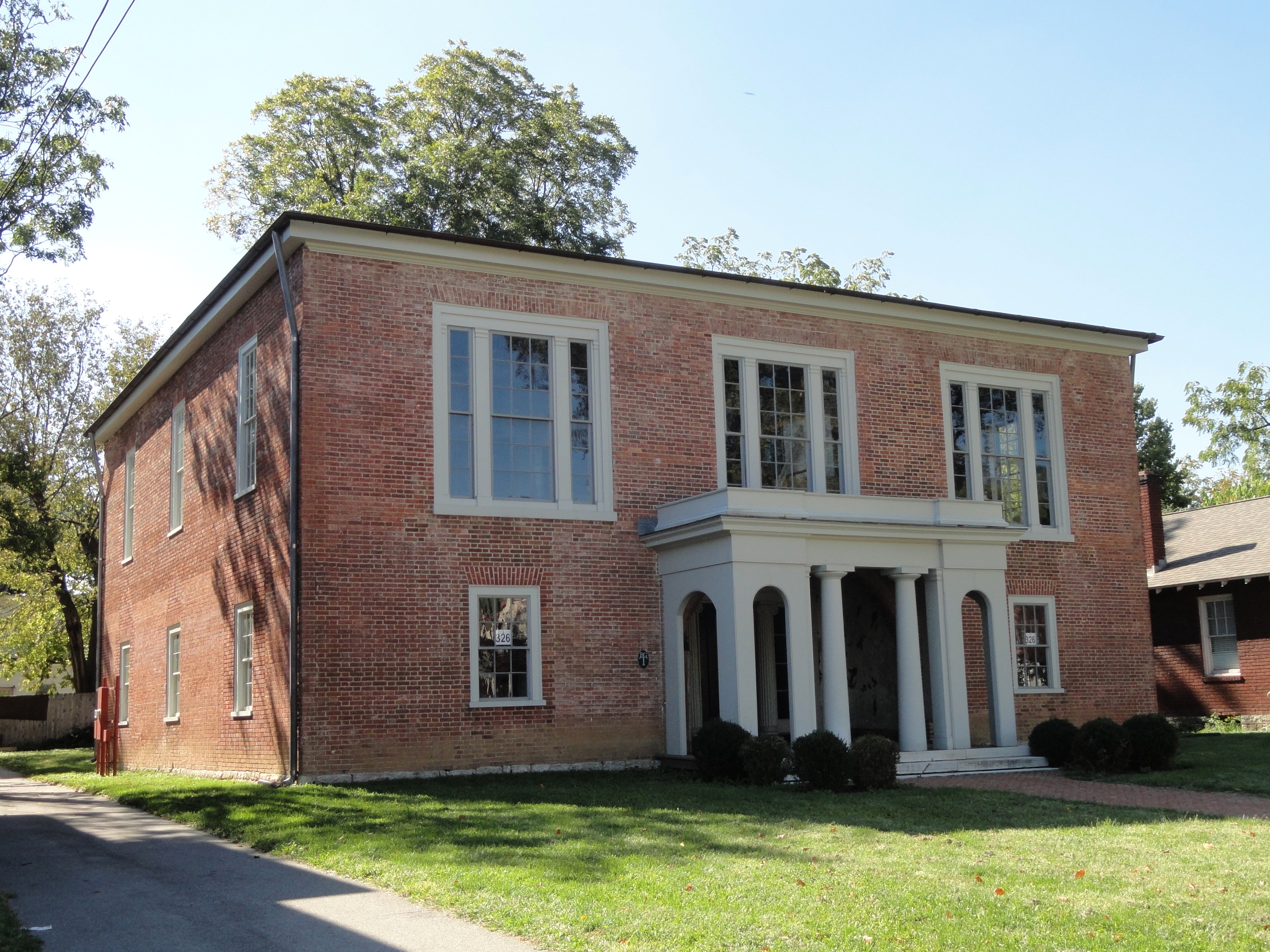
The Pope Villa

When Latrobe began private practice in England, his first projects were alterations to existing houses, designing Hammerwood Park, and designing Ashdown House, East Sussex. Alterations completed early in his career may have included Tanton Hall, Sheffield Park, Frimley, and Teston Hall, although these homes have since been altered and it is difficult now to isolate Latrobe's work in the current designs. His designs were simpler than was typical at the time, and had influences of Robert Adam. Features in his designs often included as part of the front porticos, Greek ionic columns, as used in Ashdown House, or doric columns, seen in Hammerwood Park.

The book, The Domestic Architecture of Benjamin Henry Latrobe, lists buildings he designed in England, including Grade II* listed Alderbury House (late 1800s) in Wiltshire. This structure had previously been misattributed to James Wyatt. It has been described as "one of Wiltshire's most elegant Georgian country houses".

Latrobe continued to design houses after he immigrated to the United States, mostly using Greek Revival designs. Four houses still stand that Latrobe designed: the Decatur House in Washington, D.C.; Adena in Chillicothe, Ohio; the Pope Villa in Lexington, Kentucky; and the Sedgeley Porter's house in Philadelphia. As one of Latrobe's most avant-garde designs, the Pope Villa has national significance for its unique design. He also introduced Gothic Revival architecture to the United States with the design of Sedgeley. The mansion was built in 1799 and demolished in 1857; however, the stone Porter's house at Sedgeley remains as his only extant building in Philadelphia. A theme seen in many of Latrobe's designs is plans with squarish-dimensions and a central, multi-story hall with a cupola to provide lighting, which was contrary to the popular trend of the time of building houses with long narrow plans.

== Personal life ==
- First wife: Lydia Sellon (1760–1793)
  - Lydia Sellon Mary Latrobe (1791–1878) m. Nicholas James Roosevelt
  - Henry Sellon Boneval Latrobe (1792–1817)
  - Unnamed (1793)
- Second wife: Mary Elizabeth Hazlehurst (1771–1841)
  - Juliana Latrobe (1801)
  - John Hazlehurst Boneval Latrobe (1803–1891)
  - Juliana Elizabeth Boneval Latrobe (1804–1890)
  - Mary Agnes Latrobe (1805–1806)
  - Benjamin Henry Latrobe Jr. (1806–1878)
  - Louisa Latrobe (1808)

== Notes ==
Political offices
Preceded by Stephen Hallet	Architect of the Capitol; 1803–1811; 1815–1817	Succeeded by Charles Bulfinch
